= Romina Basso =

Italian opera singer

Romina Basso (born in Gorizia) is an Italian mezzo-soprano with an extensive discography of baroque opera recordings. She is particularly noted for her performances of Vivaldi.

== Discography ==
- Nicola Porpora, Nocturnes
- Pergolesi, Adriano in Siria. Capella Cracoviensis, Jan Tomasz Adamus
- Vivaldi, Atenaide. Modo Antiquo, Federico Maria Sardelli
- Vivaldi, Ercole su'l Termodonte. Europa Galante, Fabio Biondi
- Vivaldi, Orlando Furioso. Modo Antiquo, Federico Maria Sardelli
- Vivaldi, L'oracolo in Messenia. Europa Galante, Fabio Biondi
- Handel, Giulio Cesare in Egitto. Il Complesso Barocco, Alan Curtis (harpsichordist)
- Handel, Giulio Cesare in Egitto. Orchestra of Patras, George Petrou
- Galuppi, Sacred music. Ghislieri Choir & Consort, Giulio Prandi
- Vivaldi, Armida al campo d'Egitto. Concerto Italiano, Rinaldo Alessandrini
- Vivaldi, New Discoveries I. Modo Antiquo, Federico Maria Sardelli
- Handel, Italian Cantatas Vol. 5. La Risonanza, Fabio Bonizzoni, Mark Tucker, Ruth Rosique, Roberta Invernizzi, Franziska Gottwald
- Handel, Italian Cantatas Vol. 6. La Risonanza, Fabio Bonizzoni, Mark Tucker, Ruth Rosique, Roberta Invernizzi, Franziska Gottwald
- L'Olimpiade (Opera pasticcio). Venice Baroque Orchestra, Markellos Chryssicos

=== DVD ===
- Galuppi, L'Olimpiade. Venice Baroque Orchestra, Andrea Marcon
- Mascagni, Zanetto.
