= L'Olimpiade (disambiguation) =

L'Olimpiade is a libretto by Pietro Metastasio for an opera composed by Antonio Caldara

L'Olimpiade may also refer to:

- L'Olimpiade (Vivaldi) an opera composed by Antonio Vivaldi
- L'Olimpiade (Galuppi) an opera composed by Baldassare Galuppi
- L'Olimpiade (Pergolesi) an opera composed by Giovanni Battista Pergolesi
- L'Olimpiade (Mysliveček) an opera composed by Josef Mysliveček
- L'Olimpiade (Orlandini) an opera composed by Giuseppe María Orlandini
