= L'oracolo in Messenia =

1738 opera by Antonio Vivaldi

- Opera by Antonio Vivaldi
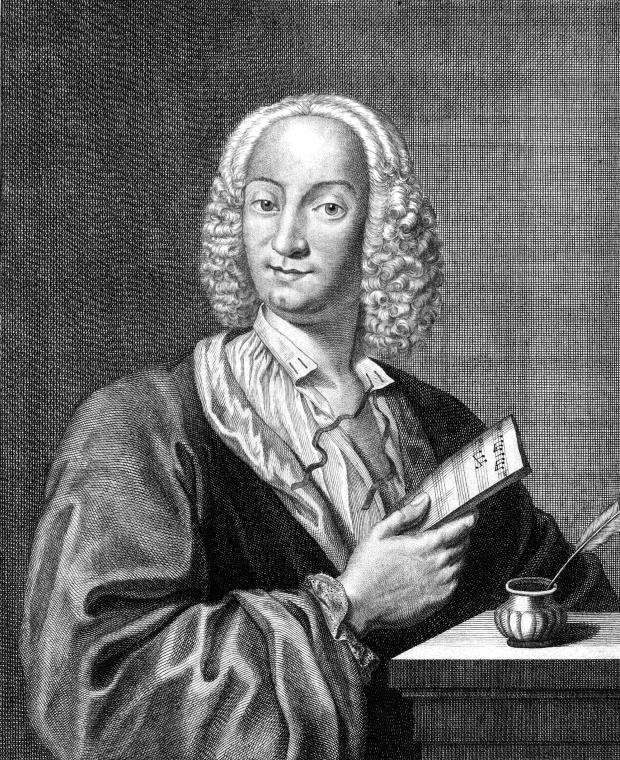
- Portrait of Vivaldi, 1725
- Librettist: Apostolo Zeno
- Language: Italian
- Based on: Merope (1713) by Francesco Scipione Maffei
- Premiere: 1738; Teatro San Angelo, Venice

L'oracolo in Messenia (The Oracle of Messene) is a 1738 pasticcio in three acts by Antonio Vivaldi to a libretto by Apostolo Zeno, based on Francesco Scipione Maffei's 1713 play Merope. The opera was composed for the autumn Venetian carnival season of 1738 after Vivaldi took over the Teatro San Angelo from the impresario who had managed it the year before. An expanded version was first staged at the Theater am Kärntnertor, Vienna. The original score was lost and a restored version by Fabio Biondi, which includes music by Riccardo Broschi and Geminiano Giacomelli, of that performance was recorded in 2012.

== Recording ==
- L'oracolo in Messenia – Magnus Staveland (Polifonte), Ann Hallenberg (Merope), Vivica Genaux (Epitide), Romina Basso (Elmira), Julia Lezhneva (Trasimede), Franziska Gottwald (Licisco), Xavier Sabata (Anassandro); Europa Galante, Fabio Biondi conducting; Virgin Classics 6025472, 2CDs 2012.

== See also ==
- List of operas by Antonio Vivaldi
