= Maurice Steger =

- Born: 1971 (age 54–55); Winterthur, Switzerland
- Genres: Classical, Baroque
- Instrument: Recorder

Maurice Steger (born 1971 in Winterthur, Switzerland) is a Swiss recorder player, conductor and professor, mostly in the field of Baroque music.

== Career ==
Maurice Steger is a frequent guest soloist with leading Baroque ensembles such as the Akademie für Alte Musik Berlin, the Musica Antiqua Köln, The English Concert, Europa Galante, the Accademia Bizantina , the Baroque Orchestra La Cetra or I Barocchisti. He also regularly appears with modern symphony orchestras such as the English Chamber Orchestra, Frankfurt Radio Symphony, the Berliner Barock Solisten, the Musikkollegium Winterthur and the Zurich Chamber Orchestra, also in the role as conductor. He has performed with celebrated artists such as Thomas Quasthoff, Dorothea Röschmann, Howard Griffiths, Cecilia Bartoli, Hilary Hahn, Laurence Cummings, Igor Oistrakh, Marcus Creed,Andreas Scholl, Nuria Rial, Fabio Biondi, Sandrine Piau, Andrew Manze, Sol Gabetta, Diego Fasolis, Albrecht Mayer and Ruth Ziesak. In recital he is regularly accompanied by Naoki Kitaya and the Continuo Consort, by Sebastian Wienand, Alexander Weimann and by Sergio Ciomei.

Since 2010 Steger started successfully to conduct Baroque and symphony orchestras: The English Concert, Zurich Chamber Orchestra, the NDR Radiophilharmonie, Malaysian Philharmonic Orchestra, Taipei Symphony Orchestra, the Sinfonieorchester Basel, Les Violons du Roy and many others became partners for Baroque and Classical repertoire.

His projects about Tino Flautino, musical fairy-tales for children, have enjoyed great success and are also available on CD (Philips a.o.), in books and on play-along products.

In addition, Maurice Steger has recorded several albums, many of which have been crowned with international awards, including Vivaldi's concertos for recorder, the Telemann flute quartets for Deutsche Grammophon (with Reinhard Goebel and the Musica Antiqua Köln). Steger records for Harmonia Mundi. He won the most important classical awards for his projects, the solo concerts of Telemann with the Akademie für Alte Musik Berlin and the album Giuseppe Sammartini (2007) with his own consort. The later recordings are an album of early Baroque music, Venezia 1625, a CD with Corelli Concertos Mr. Corelli in London and "Una Follia di Napoli" with Concertos by Southern Italian Composers (2013).

Maurice Steger teaches master classes in Europe, Asia and the Americas, is professor at the Hochschule für Musik Nürnberg and director of the Blockflötenfesttage in Bad Kissingen, Germany, since 2017 President of the Swiss Youth Music Competition SJMW and Academy Director from 2013 to 2025 at the Menuhin Festival Gstaad.

== Recordings ==
A Tribute to Bach: Concertos, Sonatas & the Ricercar Johann Sebastian Bach. With La Cetra Barockorchester Basel & Sebastian Wienand. Berlin Classics, 2023

Der Tod und das Mädchen/Sei Gutes Muts'/7 Pieces for String Quartet: Sei gutes Muts Iris ter Schiphorst (World Premiere). With Kuss Quartett. Rubicon, 2025

Mr Handel's Dinner: Concertos, Sonatas & Chaconnes by George Frideric Handel, Godfrey Finger, Francesco Geminiani & William Babell. Mit La Cetra Barockorchester Basel & Sebastian Wienand. Harmonia Mundi, 2019

Leonard Bernstein: Piano- and Chambermusic. Variations on an Octatonic Scale. With Maria Kliegel, cello, WDR, AVI Music, 2018

Baroque Twitter: Arias and Concerti. With Nuria Rial, Kammerorchester Basel, Sony Music Entertainment 2018

Souvenirs d'Italie: Music collected by Count Aloys Thomas Raimund von Harrach, with Fiorenza de Donatis, Nadja Zwiener, David Bergmüller, Philippe Grisvard a.o., Harmonia Mundi, 2016

Antonio Vivaldi: Concerti per flauti I Barocchisti, Diego Fasolis, Harmonia Mundi France Production, 2014

Una Follia di Napoli: Recorder Concerti by Domenico Sarro, Alessandro and Domenico Scarlatti, N. Fiorenza, F. Barbella and L. Leo. With his orchestra, u. a. mit Fiorenza di Donatis and Andrea Rognoni, violins; Mauro Valli, cello; Daniele Caminiti, theorbo; Margit Übellacker, dulcimer; Naoki Kitaya, harpsichord; Vanni Moretto, violone; Brigitte Gasser, lirone u. a. Harmonia Mundi France Production, 2012

Mr Corelli in London: Recorder Concerti after Corelli's Sonatas op. 5 in the orchestral version by Francesco Geminiani and ornamented soloparts by Eminent English Masters. Mit The English Concert and Laurence Cummings. Harmonia Mundi USA Production, 2010

Venezia 1625: Sonate, Symphonie, Ciaccone, Canzone e Toccate by Fontana, Uccellini, Storace, Merula e Castello. With Hille Perl, Lee Santana, Naoki Kitaya, Sergio Ciomei, Thomas Boysen, Mauro Valli, Margret Köll, Thor-Harald Johnsen, Sabrina Frey, Eva Borhi, Christian Beuse, Stefan Temmingh, Peter Barczi. Harmonia Mundi 2009

Giuseppe Sammartini: Sonate per flauto e basso. With Ciomei, Köll, Valli, Beuse, Egüez, Kitaya. Harmonia Mundi, 2007

Georg Philipp Telemann: Blockflöten-Werke. With Akademie für Alte Musik Berlin. Harmonia Mundi, 2006

Georg Philipp Telemann: Flötenquartette. With Musica Antiqua Köln and Reinhard Goebel. Deutsche Grammophon/Archiv Produktion 2005

Tino Flautino und die Zaubermelodie. Ein Musikmärchen für Kinder ab 5 Jahren. (Musik von Rodolphe Schacher, UA Mai 2009) (Schweizerischer Lehrmittelverlag)

Tino Flautino und sein Blockflötenspiel. Ein Musikmärchen für Kinder ab 4 Jahren. (Philips/Universal Music Group CD 476 111–0, MC 476 116–1)

Maurice Steger – Portrait. Claves Records CD 50–2208

Georg Philipp Telemann: Solos & Trios. Claves Records, CD 50–2112

Antonio Vivaldi: Concerti per flauto. Claves Records, CD 50–2010

La Castella. Claves Records, CD 50–9809

An English Collection. Claves Records, CD 50–9614

An Italian Ground. Claves Records, CD 50–9407

Dancing Hands. Steger plays recorder for two pieces on this renaissance and baroque CD.
