= L'Olimpiade (Galuppi) =

For Giovanni Battista Pergolesi's L'Olimpiade, see L'Olimpiade (Pergolesi)

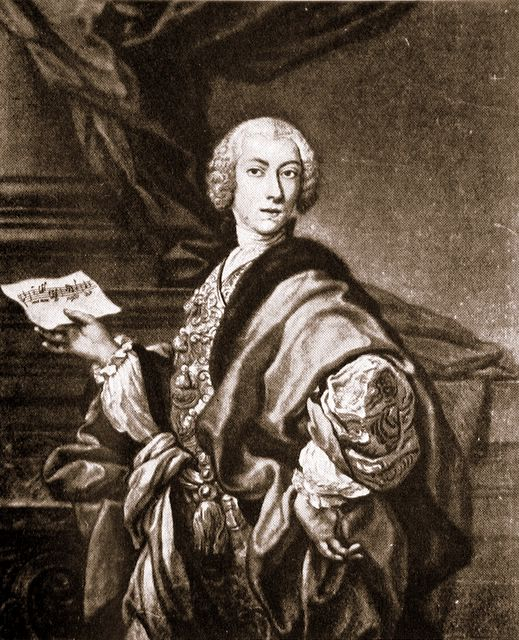
Angelo Maria Monticelli who sang the original Megacle

L'Olimpiade is an opera in three acts by Baldassare Galuppi in the opera seria style, based on the original libretto of the same name by Pietro Metastasio. It premiered on 26 December 1747 at the Teatro Regio Ducale in Milan.

== Recordings ==
- Mark Tucker (Clistene, tenor), Ruth Rosique (Aristea, soprano), Roberta Invernizzi (Argene, soprano), Romina Basso (Megacle, soprano [castrato]), Franziska Gottwald (Licidas, soprano [trouser role]), Furio Zanasi (Alcandro, contralto), Filippo Adami (Aminta, tenor); premiere recording on video DVD (2006) Andrea Marcon (conductor), Venice Baroque Orchestra, Dominique Poulange (stage director) Teatro Malibran, Venice – Dynamic Cat. 33545
