= Germanico in Germania =

Opera composed by Nicola Porpora to a libretto by Nicola Coluzzi

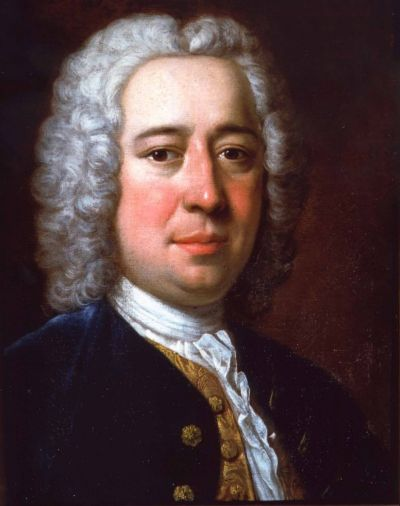
Nicola Antonio Porpora

Germanico in Germania is an opera in three acts composed by Nicola Porpora to an Italian-language libretto by Nicola Coluzzi. It premiered in February 1732 at the Teatro Capranica in Rome with an all-male cast. The leading male roles were taken by two of the most prominent castrato singers of the 18th century—Domenico Annibali as Germanico and Caffarelli as his nemesis Arminio. The female roles were portrayed by castrati en travesti. The opera's story is a fictionalised account of the Roman general Germanicus and is set in Germania Inferior during 14 AD. Germanico in Germania was very popular in its day but fell into obscurity until it was revived in 2015 at the Innsbruck Festival of Early Music.

== Recordings ==
Some of the opera's bravura arias have been recorded by the singers Simone Kermes ("Empi, se mai disciolgo"), Max Emanuel Cenčić ("Qual turbine che scende"), Flavio Ferri-Benedetti ("Qual turbine che scende") and Cecilia Bartoli ("Parto, ti lascio, o cara").

The first complete recording with Max Emanuel Cenčić, Julia Lezhneva, Dilyara Idrisova, Hasnaa Bennani, Mary-Ellen Nesi, and the Capella Cracoviensis, conducted by Jan Tomasz Adamus, was issued on Decca in January 2018.
