= L'Olimpiade =

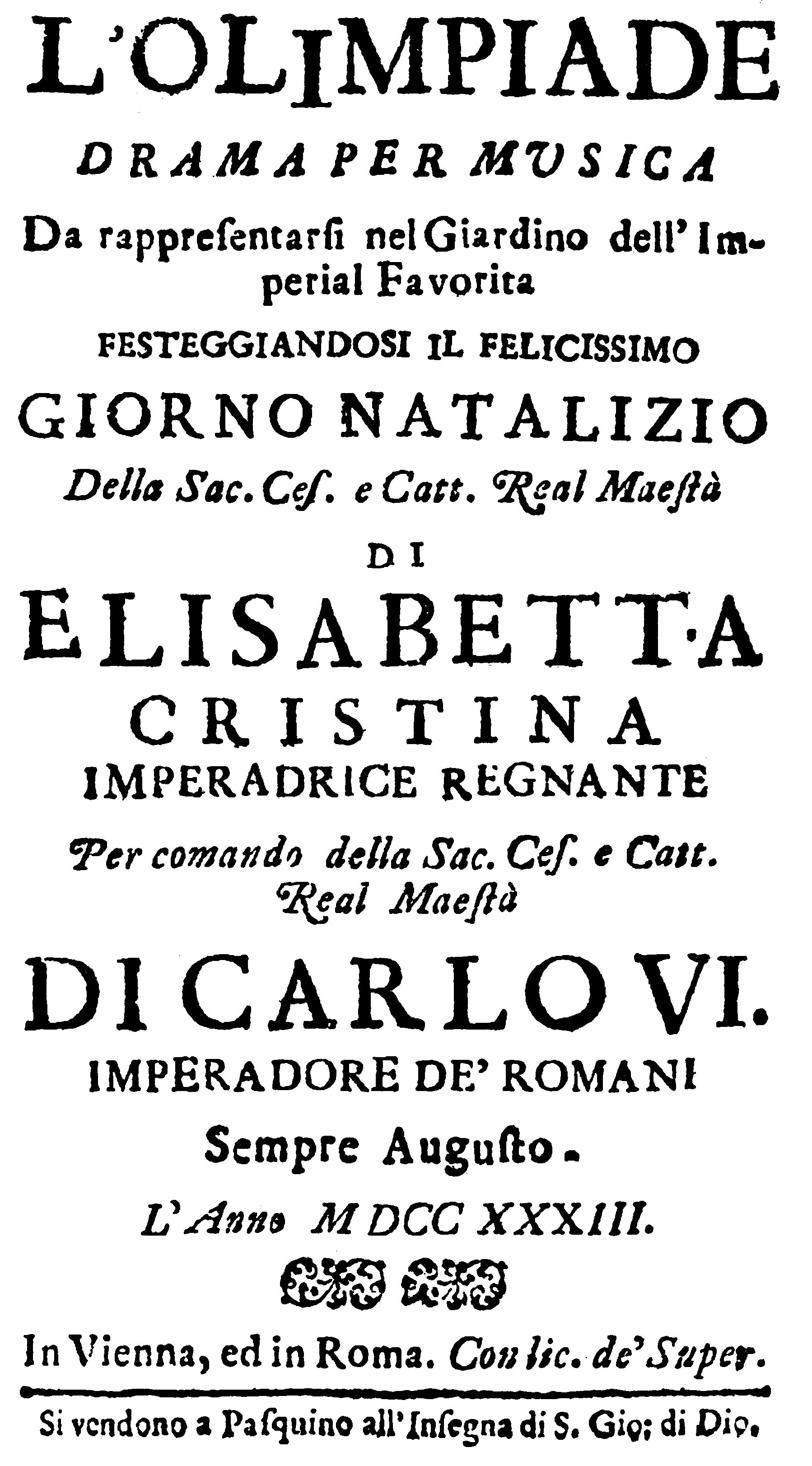
Title page (1733)

L'Olimpiade is an opera libretto in three acts by Pietro Metastasio originally written for an operatic setting by Antonio Caldara of 1733. Metastasio's plot vaguely draws upon the narrative of "The Trial of the Suitors" provided from Book 6 of The Histories of Herodotus, which had previously been the base for Apostolo Zeno's libretto Gli inganni felici (1695). The story, set in Ancient Greece at the time of the Olympic Games, is about amorous rivalry and characters' taking places to gain the loved one. The story ends with the announcement of two marriages.

== Background ==
Metastasio, as Imperial court poet at the court of Vienna, was requested to write the libretto to help celebrate the birthday of Empress Elisabeth Christine of Brunswick-Wolfenbüttel in 1733. The court composer Caldara was assigned to compose the music. The libretto attracted attention immediately and productions were soon mounted across Europe. Metastasio himself commented to Saverio Mattei that L'Olimpiade had been "performed and repeated in all the theatres of Europe". Indeed, it ranks with Metastasio's Demofoonte and Didone abbandonata, which were excelled in popularity only by Artaserse and Alessandro nell'Indie. The popularity of L'Olimpiade may subsequently have prompted Metastasio's La Nitteti, a twin drama in several respects.

== Synopsis ==
Place: Ancient Greece
Time: During the Olympic Games

=== Act 1 ===
Megacles arrives in Sicyon just in time to enter the Olympic Games under the name of Lycidas, a friend who once saved his life. Unknown to Megacles, Lycidas is in love with Aristaea, whose hand is to be offered to the winner of the games by her father, King Cleisthenes. Lycidas, once betrothed to Princess Argene of Crete, is unaware that Megacles and Aristaea already love each other, and he subsequently tells his friend of the prize. Aristaea and Megacles greet each other fondly, but Megacles now feels bound by his promise to compete as Lycidas. Meanwhile, Argene arrives in Olympia disguised as a shepherdess, to win back Lycidas.

=== Act 2 ===
Megacles wins the games, confesses the truth to Aristaea and departs, broken-hearted. When Lycidas comes to claim her, Aristaea reproaches him, as does the disguised Argene, much to his dismay. Amyntas, tutor to Lycidas, reports that Megacles has drowned himself, and King Cleisthenes, apprised of the deception, banishes Lycidas.

=== Act 3 ===
Argene prevents the desperate Aristaea from suicide, Megacles is rescued by a fisherman, and Lycidas contemplates the assassination of the king. Aristaea pleads mercy for Lycidas and Argene offers herself in his place; as proof that she is a princess, she shows Cleisthenes a chain given her by Lycidas. He recognizes it as belonging to his son, abandoned in infancy to forestall the prophecy that he would kill his father. Lycidas, reinstated, accepts Argene, leaving his sister to Megacles.

== Other settings of the libretto ==
More than 60 baroque and classical composers used the libretto for their own settings. The first composer to reuse the libretto was Antonio Vivaldi in Venice in 1734. This was followed by Giovanni Battista Pergolesi's famous version in 1735. Although Pergolesi's initial setting for Rome was not immediately successful, the number of subsequent stagings and extant manuscripts have particularly associated his name with this drama. In 1748 Baldassare Galuppi's version premiered to resounding success in Milan and the opera is now regarded as his most successful opera seria. In 1765 Thomas Arne, who "still nursed the hope of achieving success in Italian opera", persuaded the directors of The King's Theatre in London to produce his own setting of the opera, which turned out however to be a complete failure. The libretto was also the source for one of Josef Mysliveček's finest dramatic works (1778, Naples). and a popular success for Antonio Sacchini in Padua 1763. Johann Nepomuk Poissl's Der Wettkampf zu Olympia, oder Die Freunde (1815) was the first German-language setting and his version enjoyed occasional revivals during the nineteenth century.

Mozart set Cleisthenes' last aria twice, first for Aloysia Weber (KV. 294) and latter for a subscription concert by Ludwig Fischer (K 512). Beethoven set the duet "Ne' giorni tuoi felici" for tenor, soprano and orchestra in 1802 – 1803 (WoO 93).

=== List of notable settings ===
The following is a list of the most notable operas that subsequently utilized Metastasio's libretto in chronological order of first performance:

- Antonio Caldara, L'Olimpiade, Vienna, 1733
- Antonio Vivaldi, L'Olimpiade, Venice, Teatro Sant'Angelo, 1734
- Giovanni Battista Pergolesi, L'Olimpiade, Rome, 1735
- Leonardo Leo, L'Olimpiade, Naples, 1737
- Baldassare Galuppi, L'Olimpiade, Milan, 1748
- Davide Perez, L'Olimpiade, Lisbon, 1753
- Johann Adolf Hasse, L'Olimpiade, Dresden, 1756
- Tommaso Traetta, L'Olimpiade, Verona, 1758
- Niccolò Jommelli, L'Olimpiade, Stuttgart, 1761
- Niccolò Piccinni, L'Olimpiade, Rome, 1761
- Vincenzo Manfredini, L'Olimpiade, Moscow, 1762
- Antonio Sacchini, L'Olimpiade, Padua, 1763
- Florian Leopold Gassmann, L'Olimpiade, Vienna, 1764
- Thomas Arne, L'Olimpiade, London, 1765
- Giuseppe Sarti, L'Olimpiade, Florence, 1778
- Josef Mysliveček, L'Olimpiade, Naples, Teatro San Carlo, 4 November 1778
- Luigi Cherubini, L'Olimpiade, Venice, 1783
- Domenico Cimarosa, L'Olimpiade, Vicenza, 10 July 1784
- Giovanni Paisiello, L'Olimpiade, Naples, Teatro San Carlo, 20 January 1786
- Johann Friedrich Reichardt, L'Olimpiade, Berlin, Kgl, 2 Oct 1791
- Gaetano Donizetti, L'Olimpiade, (1817, duet alone)

== Recordings ==
- Vivaldi: L'Olimpiade (Vivaldi), recording on CD - Rinaldo Alessandrini (Conductor) - Concerto Italiano - Cast: Sara Mingardo (Licida), Roberta Invernizzi (Megacle), Sonia Prina (Aristea), Marianna Kulikova (Argene), Laura Giordano (Aminta), Riccardo Novaro (Clistene), Sergio Foresti (Alcandro) - Naïve Records, Vivaldi Edition
- Pergolesi: L'Olimpiade (Pergolesi):
  - recording on CD - 2010 Innsbruck (period instruments) - Alessandro De Marchi (Conductor), Academia Montis Regalis - Cast: Jeffrey Francis, Raffaella Milanesi, Ann-Beth Solvang, Jennifer Rivera, Olga Pasishnyk - Deutsche Harmonia Mundi Cat. 88697807712
  - recording on video DVD – 2011 Teatro Valeria Moriconi, Iesi – Alessandro De Marchi (Conductor), Academia Montis Regalis, Mondavi; Italo Nunziata (stage director) – Cast: Raúl Giménez (Clistene), Lyubov Petrova (Aristea), Yetzabel Arias Fernández (Argene), Jennifer Rivera (Licida), Sofia Soloviy (Megacie), Antonio Lozano (Aminta), Milena Storti (Alcandro) – Arthaus Musik Cat. 101 650 (DVD)
- Galuppi: L'Olimpiade (Galuppi), premiere recording on video DVD - 2006 Teatro Malibran, Venice - Andrea Marcon (Conductor), Venice Baroque Orchestra, Dominique Poulange (stage director) - Cast: Mark Tucker, Ruth Rosique, Roberta Invernizzi, Romina Basso, Franziska Gottwald - Dynamic Cat. 33545
- Cimarosa: L'Olimpiade - recording on CD - Royal Opera of Versailles - Christophe Rousset (Conductor), Les Talens Lyriques - Mathilde Ortscheidt, Alex Banfield, Maite Beaumont, Marie Lys, Rocio Pérez, Josh Lovell - Château de Versailles Spectacles – Collection Opéra Italien N° 6
- Mysliveček: L'Olimpiade (Mysliveček) - live recording on CD - 2012 Teatro Comunale di Bologna - Oliver von Dohnányi (Conductor) - Cast: Pervin Chakar, Yasushi Watanabe, Erika Tanaka, Maria Teresa Leva, Carlo Vistoli, Saltan Akhmetova, Pasquale Scircoli - Bongiovanni GB 2469/70-2
