= K165 =

K165 or K-165 may refer to:

- K-165 (Kansas highway), a former state highway in Kansas
- Exsultate, jubilate, a 1773 motet by Wolfgang Amadeus Mozart
