= L'Olimpiade (Mysliveček) =

Opera by Josef Mysliveček

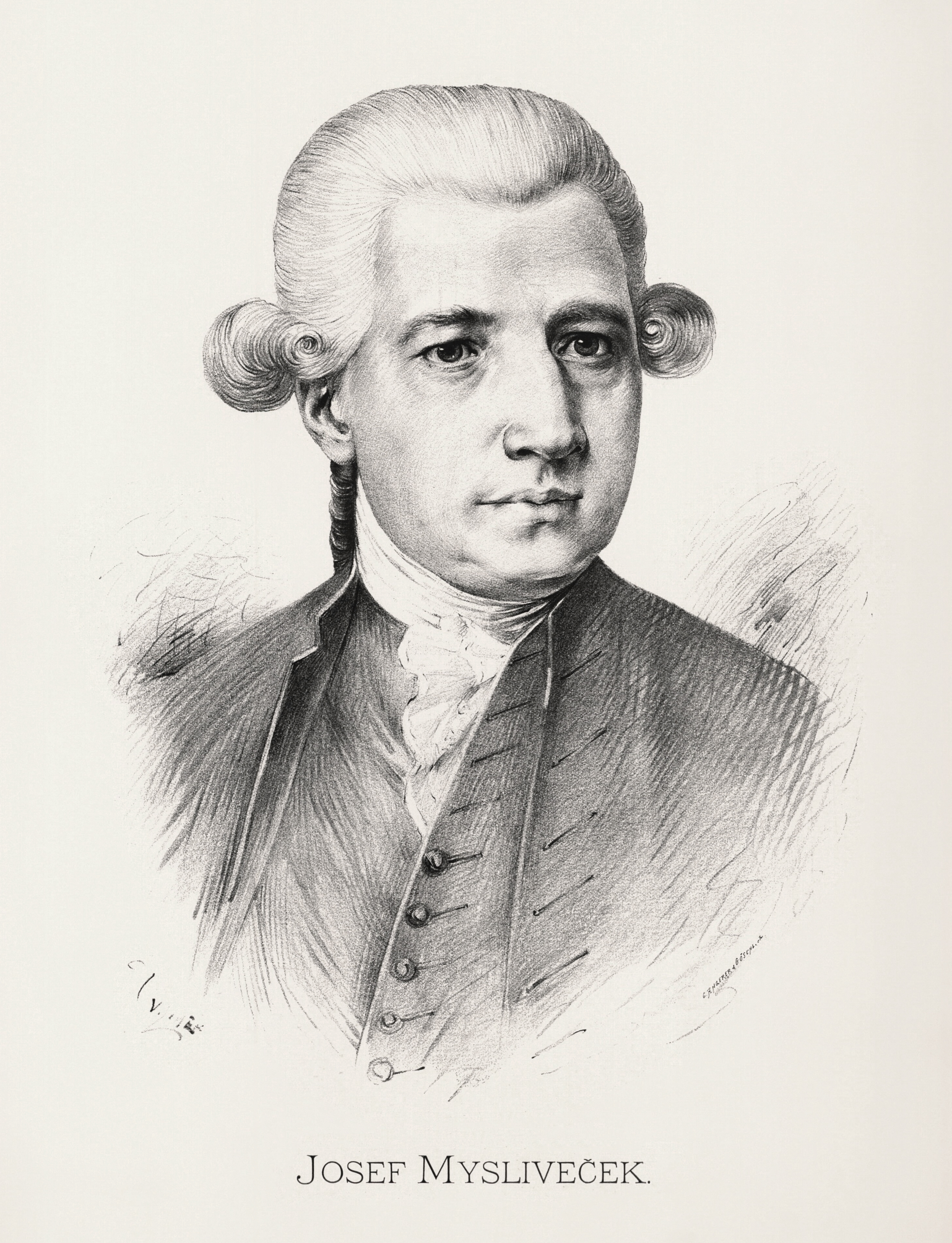
Josef Mysliveček

L'Olimpiade is an 18th-century Italian opera in 3 acts by the Czech composer Josef Mysliveček. It was composed to a libretto by the Italian poet Metastasio that was first performed in Vienna in 1733 with music by Antonio Caldara. The text is famous for its depiction of a celebration of the Ancient Olympic Games. For a performance in the 1770s, it would only be expected that a libretto of such age would be abbreviated and altered to suit contemporary operatic taste; some of the original aria texts would be omitted or substituted, and the remaining aria texts would be set more expansively. In this case, only 14 of the original 18 aria texts of Metastasio were newly set to music. The cuts and changes in the text made for the 1778 performance of Mysliveček's opera are not attributable. This opera (and all the rest of Mysliveček's operas) belong to the serious type in Italian language referred to as opera seria that usually featured the designation dramma per musica in librettos.

== Performance history ==
The opera was first performed at the Teatro San Carlo in Naples on 4 November 1778, the nameday of king Charles III of Spain, the former ruler of the Kingdom of Naples whose birthday and nameday were still celebrated with operatic productions under the rule of his son Ferdinand. It is unquestionably one of the finest setting of this Metastasian libretto ever produced. Contemporary music criticism praised in particular the composer's setting of the aria "Se cerca, se dice" as sung by Luigi Marchesi, a close friend and professional collaborator of the composer. Mysliveček's L'Olimpiade was revived in 2005 at the Narodní Divadlo Moravskoslezské in Ostrava, then revived again as a new production at the Estates Theatre in Prague, the Grand Théâtre in Dijon, the Théâtre de Caen, and the Grand Théâtre in Luxembourg in April and May 2013. A version of the latter production was also repeated in concert format at the Theater an der Wien in Vienna in March 2014.

== In film ==
A documentary film about the genesis of the Prague production, produced by Mimesis Film and directed by Petr Václav, was released in 2015 under the title Zpověď zapomenutého in Czech and Confession of the Vanished in English. It was the winner of a Trilobit Beroun Award in 2016 and a gold prize in its category at the FIPA film competition in Biarritz in 2016 (the FIPA d'or). A scene from L'Olimpiade that portrays a staged performance of the aria "Se cerca, se dice" is found in the film Il Boemo (2022), a biopic based on the life of Josef Mysliveček also directed by Petr Václav.

== Roles ==
Role	Voice type	Premiere cast, 4 November 1778, Teatro San Carlo, Naples
Clistene, king of Sicyon	tenor	Giovanni Ansani
Aristea, his daughter, beloved of Megacle	soprano	Giuseppa Maccherini Ansani
Megacle, in love with Aristea, friend of Licida	soprano castrato	Luigi Marchesi
Licida, believed to be the son of the king of Crete, in love with Aristea, friend of Megacle	soprano castrato	Pietro Muschietti
Argene, a Cretan lady dressed as a shepherdess under the name of Licori, in love with Licida	soprano	Geltrude Flavis
Aminta, tutor of Licida	tenor	Giacinto Perrone
Alcandro, confidant of Clistene	soprano	Antonia Rubinacci (in a breeches role)

== Synopsis ==
18th-century Italian operas in serious style are almost always set in a distant or legendary past and are built around historical, pseudo-historical, or mythological characters. Metastasio's L'Olimpiade is highly exceptional in being named for an event, not a character, in this case a celebration of the Olympic Games in ancient Greece. Metastasio's librettos are ordinarily love intrigues that resolve into marriage. Seemingly insoluble dilemmas that keep lovers from marrying throughout the drama find solutions just before the end. Two happy marriages are generally portrayed, just as in this drama.

=== Act I ===
Megacle arrives in Sicyon just in time to enter the Olympic Games under the name of Licida, a friend who once saved his life. Unknown to Megacle, Licida is in love with Aristea, whose hand is to be offered to the winner of the games by her father, King Clistene. Licida, once betrothed to Princess Argene of Crete, is unaware that Megacle and Aristea already love each other, and he subsequently tells his friend of the prize. Aristea and Megacle greet each other fondly, but Megacle now feels bound by his promise to compete as Licida. Meanwhile, Argene arrives in Olympia disguised as a shepherdess, to win back Licida.

=== Act II ===
Megacle wins the games, confesses the truth to Aristea and departs, broken-hearted. When Licida comes to claim her, Aristea reproaches him, as does the disguised Argene, much to his dismay. Aminta, tutor to Licida, reports that Megacle has drowned himself, and King Clistene, apprised of the deception, banishes Licida.

=== Act III ===
Argene prevents the desperate Aristea from suicide, Megacle is rescued by a fisherman, and Licidas contemplates the assassination of the king. Aristea pleads mercy for Licida and Argene offers herself in his place; as proof that she is a princess, she shows Clistene a chain given her by Licida. He recognizes it as belonging to his son, abandoned in infancy to forestall the prophecy that he would kill his father. Licida, reinstated, accepts Argene, leaving his sister to Megacle.

== Vocal set pieces ==
Act I, scene 2 - Aria of Megacle, "Superbo di me stesso"
Act I, scene 4 - Chorus with Argene and Aristea, "O care selve"
Act I, scene 5 - Aria of Clistene, "Del destin non vi lagnate"
Act I, scene 6 - Aria of Aristea, "Tu di saper procura"
Act I, scene 7 - Aria of Argene, "Più non si trovano"
Act I, scene 8 - Aria of Licida, "Mentre dormi, amor fomenti"
Act I, scene 9 - Accompanied recitative for Megacle, "Che intesi, eterni Dei?," and cavatina, "Cara non dubitar" [a non-Metastasian text]
Act I, scene 10 - Accompanied recitative for Aristea and Megacle, "E tu mi lasci così?"
Act I, scene 10 - Duet of Aristea and Megacle, "Ne' giorni tuoi felici"

Act II, scene 1 - Aria of Alcandro, "Dimmi qual è l'affanno" [a non-Metastasian text]
Act II, scene 3 - Aria of Argene, "Che non mi disse"
Act II, scene 4 - Aria of Aminta, "Siam navi all'onde algenti"
Act II, scene 4 - Chorus, "Del forte Licida"
Act II, scene 6 - Aria of Clistene, "So che il paterno impero" [parody of original Metastasian text in this position, "So ch'è fanciullo amore"]
Act II, scene 8 - Accompanied recitative for Megacle, "Misero me, che veggo"
Act II, scene 9 - Aria of Megacle, "Se cerca, se dice"
Act II, Scene 10 - Aria of Aristea, "Tu me da me dividi"
Act II, Scene 13 - Accompanied recitative for Licida, "Con questo ferro, indegno"
Act II, scene 13 - Aria of Licida, "Gemo in un punto e fremo"

Act III, scene 3 - Aria of Aristea, "Caro, son tua così"
Act III, scene 4 - Aria of Megacle, "Lo seguitai felice"
Act III, scene 6 - Aria of Aminta, "Son qual per mare ignoto"
Act III, scene 6 - Chorus, "I tuoi strali terror de' mortali"
Act III, scene 7 - Aria of Clistene, "Non so donde viene"
Act III, scene 8 - Accompanied recitative for Clistene, "O degli uomini padre"
Act III, scene 11 - Chorus, "Viva il figlio deliquente"

== Score ==
The complete score of L'Olimpiade is available for study online on the Italian website Internet Culturale in the form of a reproduction of a manuscript once in the possession of the Teatro San Carlo of Naples.

== Recordings ==
The overture to Mysliveček's L'Olimpiade is included in a collection of symphonies and overtures by the composer recorded by the L'Orfeo Barockorchester, Michi Gaigg, conductor, CPO 777-050 (2004).

Two arias drawn from the role of Argene in Mysliveček's L'Olimpiade are available in a collection recorded by the Czech mezzo-soprano Magdalena Kožená: "Più non si trovano" and "Che non mi disse." The recording is Deutsche Grammophon 0289-4776153 (2002) with the Prague Philharmonia, Michel Swierczewski, conductor.

The complete opera has been recorded by the orchestra of the Teatro Comunale di Bologna, Oliver von Dohnányi, conductor, with the choir of the Teatro Comunale di Bologna, Naxos (2014). The soloists include Pervin Chakar, Yasushi Watanabe, Erika Tanaka, Maria Teresa Leva, Carlo Vistoli, Saltan Akhmetova, and Pasquale Scircoli.
