= Johann Nepomuk von Poißl =

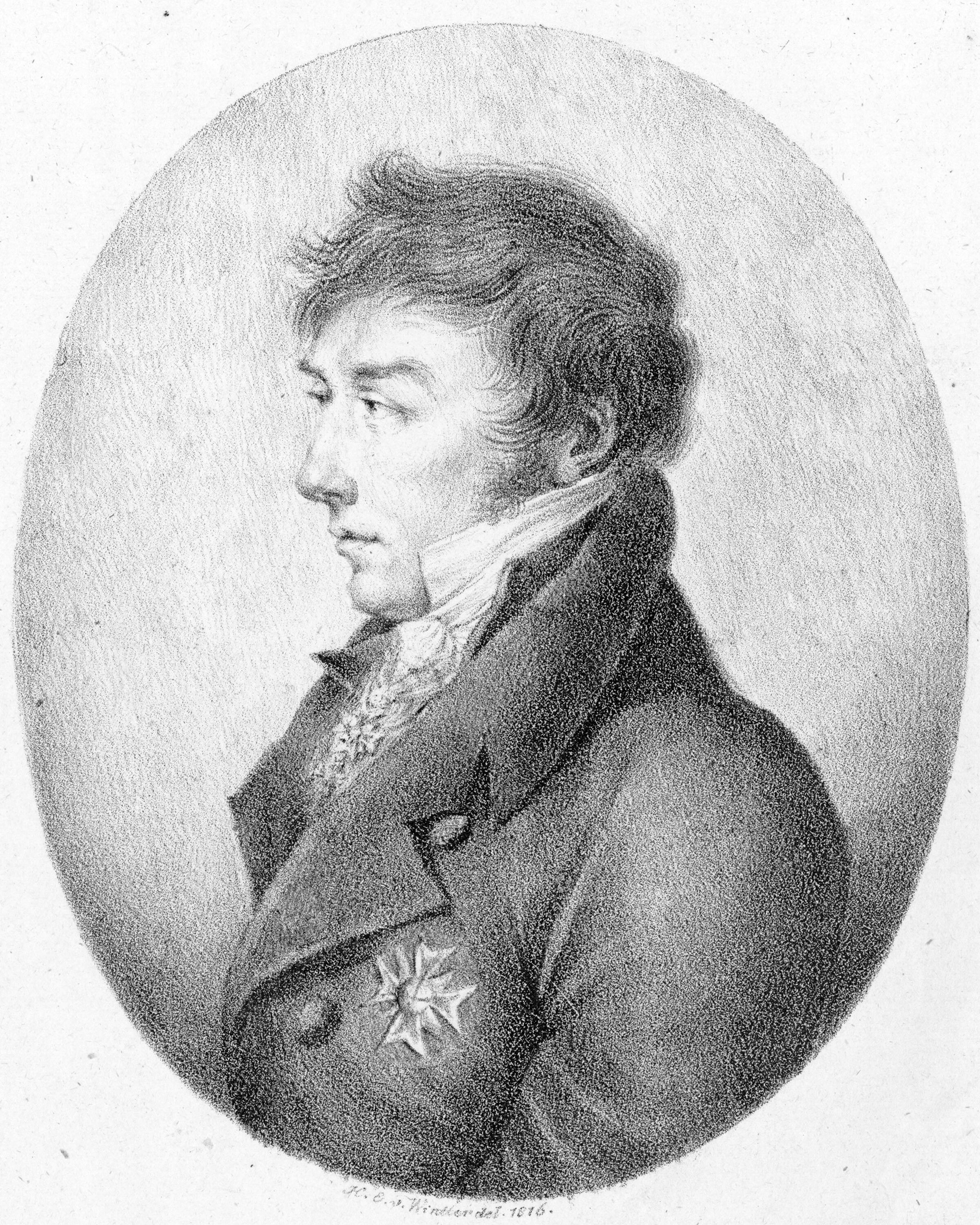
Johann Nepomuk von Poißl

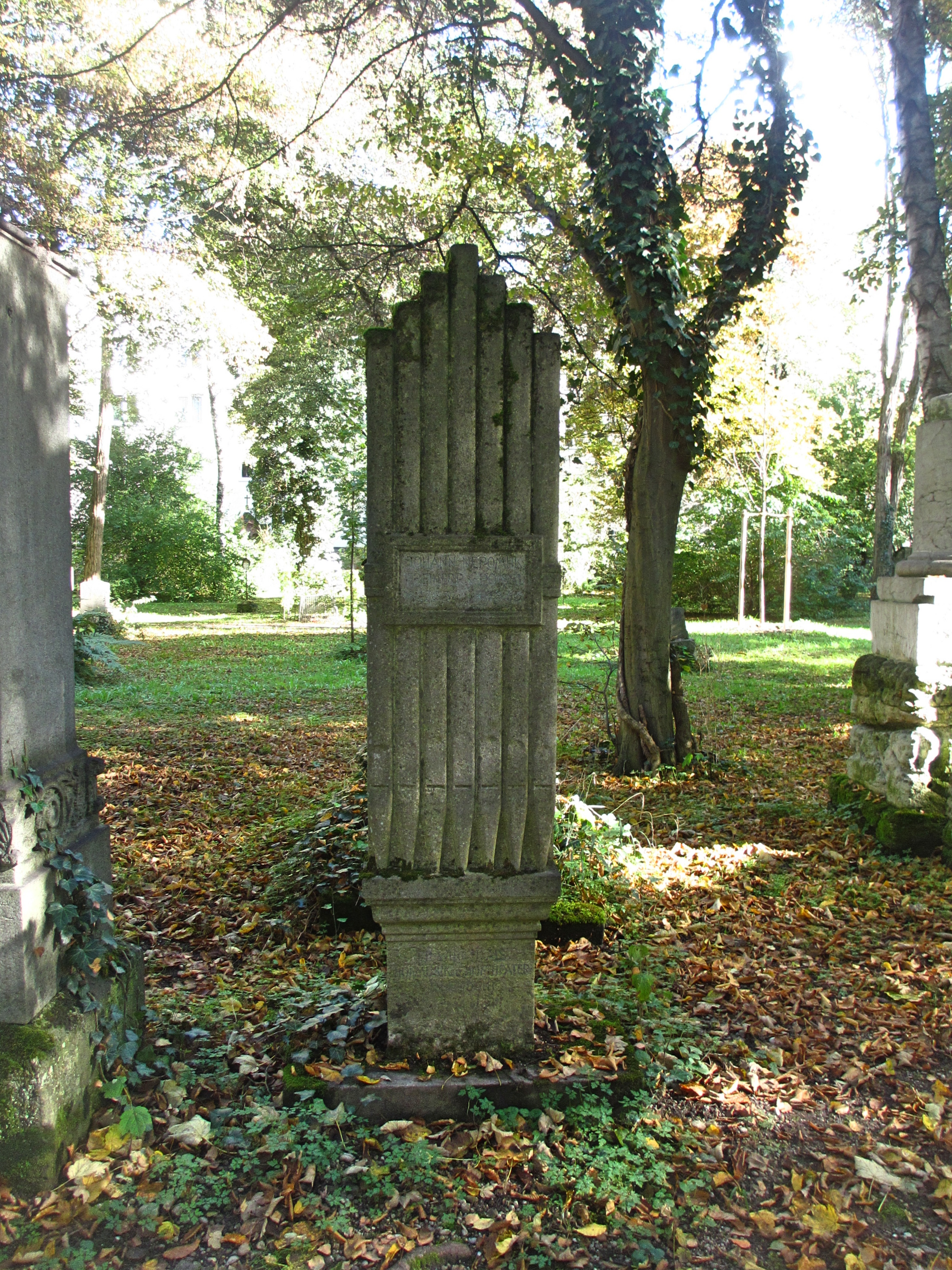
Grave of Johann Poißl in Munich

Johann Nepomuk von Poißl (15 February 1783 – 17 August 1865) was a Bavarian composer and intendant.

He was born in the Haunkenzell Castle in Rattiszell, Straubing-Bogen, Bavaria. He died in Munich.

== Selected works ==
=== Operas ===
- Antigonus (1808)
- Ottaviano in Sicilia (1812)
- Athalia, libretto by Johann Gottfried Wohlbrück after Jean Racine (1814/1817)
- Der Wettkampf zu Olympia, oder Die Freunde (1815)
- Dir wie mir (1816)
- Nittetis (1817)
- Issipile (1817/1818)
- Die Prinzessin von Provence (1825)
- Der Untersberg (1829)
- Zayde (1843)
