= Angelo Maria Monticelli =

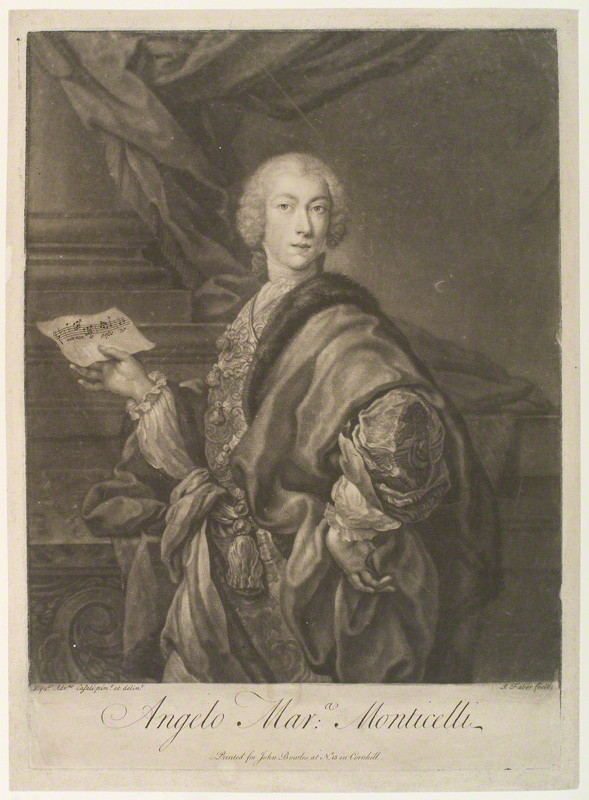
Mezzotint by John Faber the Younger, after Andrea Casali. In the National Portrait Gallery, London.

Angelo Maria Monticelli (c. 1710-1712 – September 1758 or 1764) was an Italian castrato, appearing in operas in Italy, Vienna, Dresden, and from 1741 to 1746 in London.

== Life ==
Monticelli was born in Milan. Scholars date his birth to either c. 1710 or c. 1712. He made his stage debut at the Teatro San Moisè in Venice on November 6, 1728 in Tomaso Albinoni's Le due rivali in amore. Following this, he appeared in various cities in Italy, including Treviso, Padua and Verona; there were further appearances in Venice, including in 1731 and 1732 with Giovanni Carestini, Antonio Bernacchi and Faustina Bordoni. He was most often cast as protagonists on the opera stage.

He was a member of the Wiener Hofmusikkapelle from 1732 to 1740, also appearing in Italy during this period.

He came to London in the autumn of 1741, making his début in the pasticcio Alessandro in Persia. In early 1742 he appeared in the opera L'Olimpiade by Giovanni Battista Pergolesi; Charles Burney wrote that "the whole scene, in which 'Se ceroa se dice' occurs, was rendered so interesting by the manner in which it was acted as well as sung by Monticelli that the union of poetry and music, expression and gesture, have seldom had a more powerful effect on an English audience". His fame grew, and he was considered one of the best castrati of the time.

He continued to perform in London; in 1744, he sang, in Alfonso, songs of more bravura execution than he had previously attempted, and in 1746 he was in Gluck's La caduta de' giganti. Antigono by Baldassare Galuppi, produced in May of that year, was the last opera in which Monticelli was seen in London. He appeared in Naples with Regina Mingotti in the same year, and afterwards in Vienna. In 1753 Johann Adolph Hasse engaged him for the court opera in Dresden. He died in Dresden, in September 1758 (according to a letter by Pietro Metastasio) or in 1764 (from other sources).
