= Aris Christofellis =

Greek singer

- Άρης Χριστοφέλλης
- Born: 5 February 1960 (age 66); Athens, Greece
- Occupations: Singer (sopranist); musicologist
- Years active: 1984–present

Aris Christofellis (Greek: Άρης Χριστοφέλλης; born 5 February 1960) is a Greek sopranist (male soprano singer) and musicologist.

== Life and career ==
Aris Christofellis was born in Athens. After studying piano in Athens and Paris with several teachers including the famous pianist France Clidat, he decided to concentrate on developing his male soprano singing voice, studying with Fofi Sarandopoulo. He made his debut in Bordeaux in 1984. In 1985 he sang Wolfgang Amadeus Mozart's Exsultate, jubilate at Cannes Midem Classique inauguration concert.

His repertoire extends from Renaissance to contemporary music, but he focuses on the Italian baroque opera of the 18th and early 19th century. As a musicologist, he has brought to light many works of this period and has dealt in particular with the ornamentation of the vocal music of the 18th and 19th centuries. As a performer, in addition to lieder and folk songs he concentrates on Baroque opera, and he is known for singing roles written for castrati. He maintains an extensive discography with several recordings for EMI Classics between the mid 1990s and early 2000.

Since the end of the 1990s, Christofellis has significantly reduced his concert and opera performances and has started a career as a singing teacher.
