= Stefan Temmingh =

South African recorder player (born 1978)

Stefan Temmingh (born 1978 in Cape Town) is a South African recorder player who now lives in Munich.

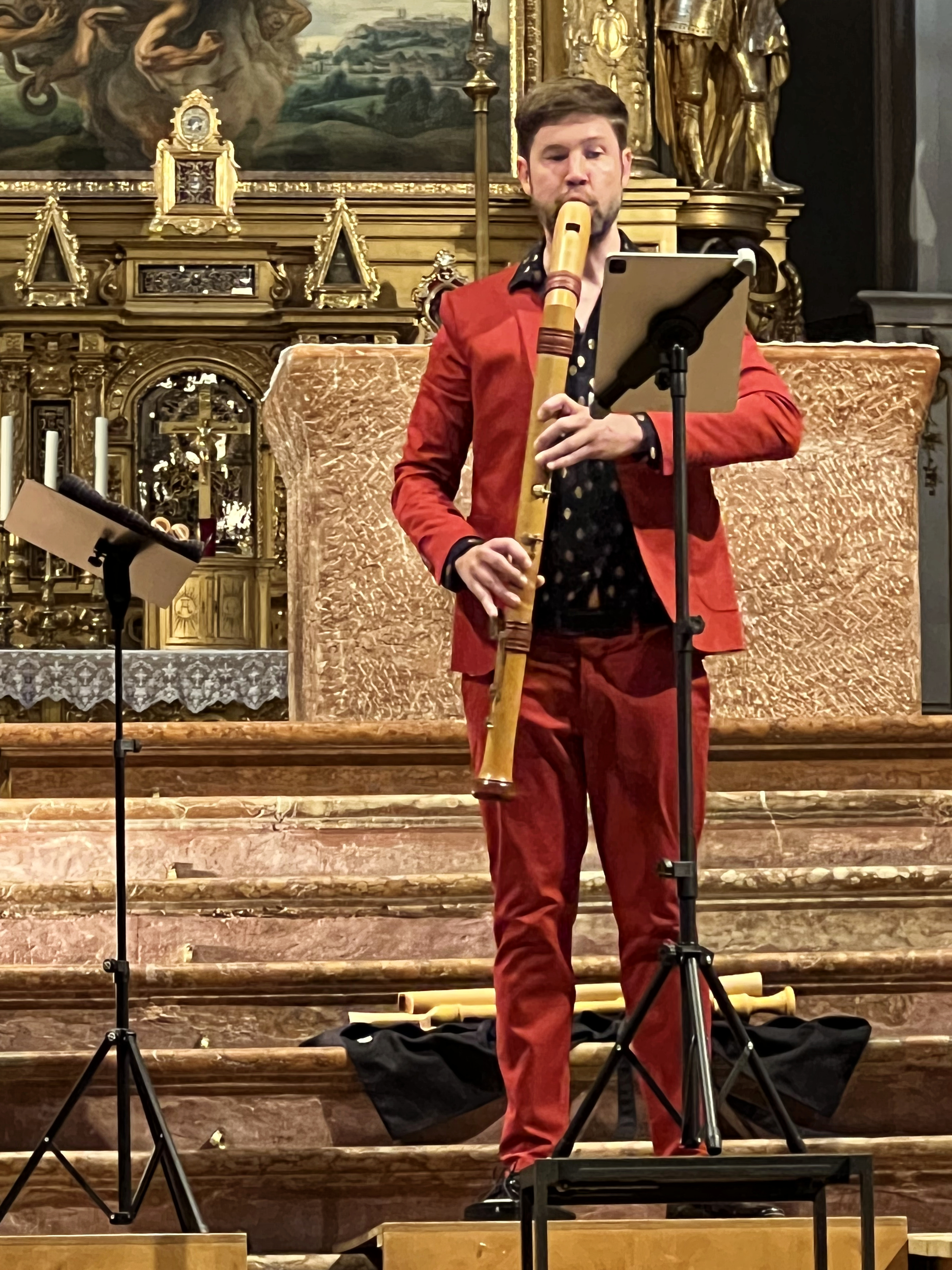
Stefan Temmingh in the Dome zu Freising

He comes from a South African-Dutch family of musicians. In 1998, he moved to Munich to take lessons with Markus Zahnhausen. From 1999 he also studied pedagogy and performance practice at the Richard Strauss Conservatory in Munich, where he received his diploma in 2003. Afterwards he continued his studies with Michael Schneider at the Musikhochschule Frankfurt. Since 2019, he teaches as professor at the Hochschule für Musik Freiburg and since 2025 also at the Royal Conservatory of The Hague.

Temmingh's repertoire includes almost the complete original literature of the Baroque period for recorder. He has been engaged with the Ensemble Phoenix Munich, the Berlin Lautten Compagney, at the Ludwigsburg Schlossfestspiele, the Audi Summer Concerts and at the Bavarian State Opera. As a specialist for early music he played together with Thomas Boysen, Sergio Ciomei, Joel Frederiksen, Naoki Kitaya, Margret Köll, Karsten Erik Ose, Maurice Steger and Olga Watts. In addition to appearances in Germany and South Africa, he has performed in the Netherlands, Switzerland, Austria, France, Russia, Croatia, the Czech Republic, Slovakia and Lebanon. He has recorded for Harmonia Mundi, OehmsClassics, Christophorus Records, Südwestdeutscher and Bayerischer Rundfunk.

Temmingh's commitment ranges from old to new music. He regularly performs concerts and world premieres of contemporary works, which he also commissions from composers such as Bernhard Lang, Nadir Vassena, Gordon Kampe or Helga Pogatschar.

In 2008 he was awarded the scholarship of the City of Munich for New Music.

Since 2001 Temmingh has been committed to the intercultural interplay of traditional black African and classical European music, which led to a European tour of the baroque ensemble Refugium with the Dizu Kuduhorn Band in 2004.

He has won the 2016 ECHO Klassik Award, Instrumentalist of the Year

His 2018 album Vivaldi was awarded an International Classical Music Award and the Editor’s Choice of Gramophone

In 2022, he's won OPUS Klassik "Konzerteinspielung des Jahres" for the recording "Leipzig 1723"
