= Exsultate, jubilate =

1773 motet by Wolfgang Amadeus Mozart

- Motet by W. A. Mozart
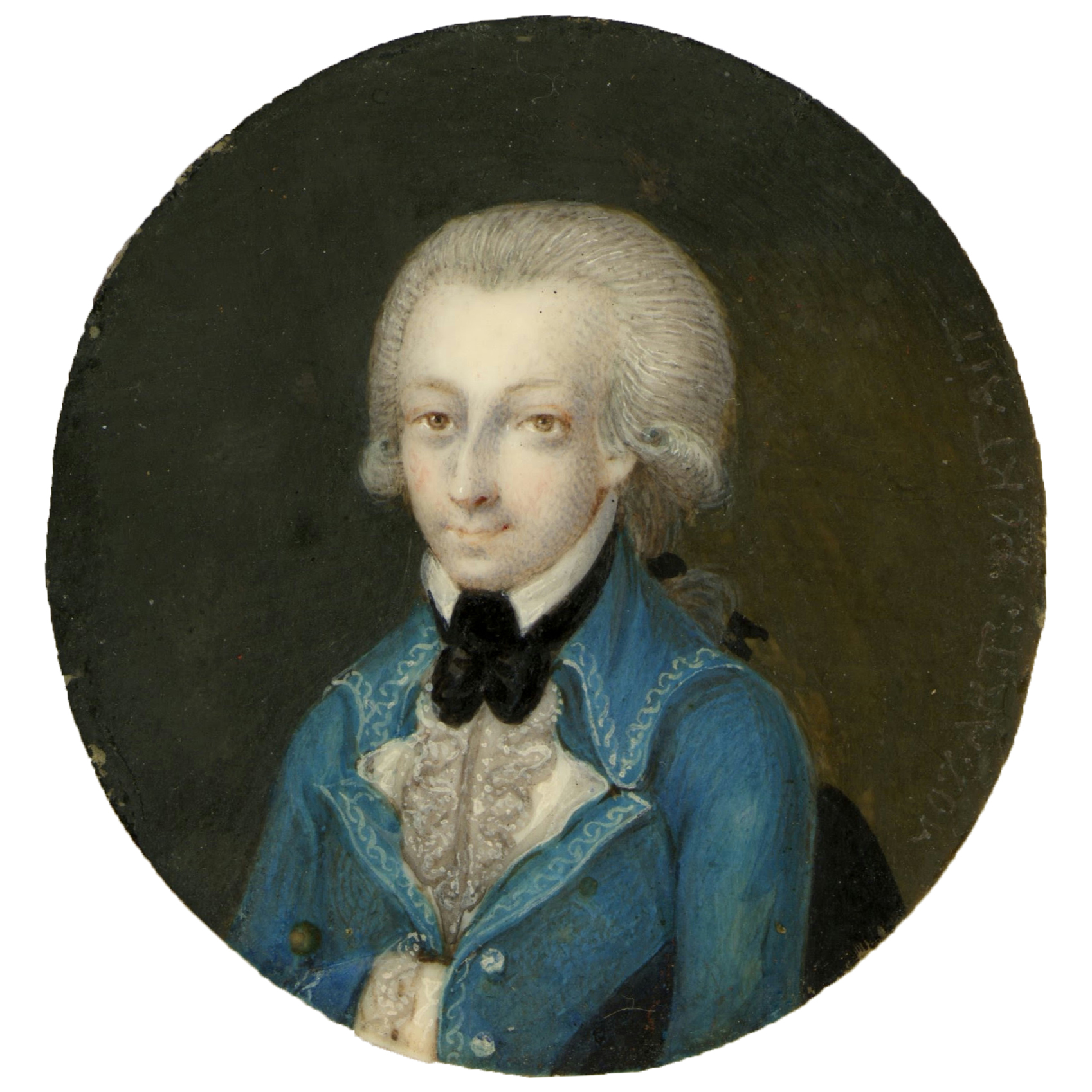
- 1773 miniature of Mozart
- Catalogue: K. 165
- Language: Latin
- Composed: 1773: Milan
- Performed: 17 January 1773
- Movements: 4
- Scoring: soprano; orchestra

Exsultate, jubilate (Exult, rejoice), K. 165, is a 1773 motet by Wolfgang Amadeus Mozart.

== History ==
This religious solo motet was composed when Mozart was staying in Milan during the production of his opera Lucio Silla which was being performed there in the Teatro Regio Ducale. It was written for the castrato Venanzio Rauzzini, who had sung the part of the primo uomo Cecilio in Lucio Silla the previous year. While waiting for the end of the run (from 26 December 1772 to 25 January 1773), Mozart composed the motet for his singer, whose technical excellence he admired. Its first performance took place at the Theatine Church on 17 January 1773, while Rauzzini was still singing in Mozart's opera at night. Mozart made some revisions around 1780. On 30 May 1779, a Trinity Sunday, a revised version was performed by Francesco Ceccarelli at the Holy Trinity Church, Salzburg. Another revised version was intended for Christmas. The manuscripts of the two Salzburg versions were discovered in 1978 in St. Jakob, Wasserburg am Inn. While in modern times the motet is usually sung by a soprano, it was also recorded by a number of countertenors, including Michael Maniaci, Franco Fagioli, Arno Raunig and Aris Christofellis (the latter recorded only the Alleluia movement).

The autograph manuscript of the motet is preserved in the Jagiellonian Library.

== Structure ==
External audio
- Performance by Kiri Te Kanawa, London Symphony Orchestra, Colin Davis conducting (1971); via Internet Archive

It has four sections:

1. Exsultate jubilate – Allegro (F major)
2. Fulget amica dies – Secco recitative
3. Tu virginum corona – Andante (A major)
4. Alleluja – Allegro (F major)

Musicologist Stanley Sadie called the final section, "Alleluia", "a jewel of a piece with its high spirits and its wit ... like no other piece of Mozart's; its music speaks unmistakably of his relaxed high spirits at the time he wrote it and of the elation and confidence that his opera-house success had brought him".

Although nominally for liturgical use, the motet has many features in common with Mozart's concert arias, such as those drawn from his operas. Mozart also used elements of concerto form in this motet.

== Instrumentation ==
The motet is scored for soprano solo, 2 oboes (or 2 flutes), bassoon, 2 natural horns in F, organ, 1st and 2nd violins and violas, cello, and double bass.

The occasionally divided viola section gives the orchestra a richer sound. This is something Mozart did more often, for example in his Sinfonia Concertante KV 364 in E-flat major for violin, viola and orchestra.

== Libretto ==
Written in Latin, the author of the text is unknown but may have been Rauzzini.

Exsultate, jubilate,
o vos animae beatae,
dulcia cantica canendo,
cantui vestro respondendo,
psallant aethera cum me.

Rejoice, resound with joy,
o you blessed souls,
singing sweet songs,
In response to your singing
let the heavens sing forth with me.

Fulget amica dies,
jam fugere et nubila et procellae;
exorta est justis
inexspectata quies.
Undique obscura regnabat nox,
surgite tandem laeti
qui timuistis adhuc,
et jucundi aurorae fortunatae
frondes dextera plena et lilia date.

The friendly day shines forth,
both clouds and storms have fled now;
for the righteous there has arisen
an unexpected calm.
Dark night reigned everywhere [before];
arise, happy at last,
you who feared till now,
and joyful for this lucky dawn,
give garlands and lilies with full right hand.

Tu virginum corona,
tu nobis pacem dona,
tu consolare affectus,
unde suspirat cor.

You, o crown of virgins,
grant us peace,
Console our feelings,
from which our hearts sigh.

Alleluja, alleluja!

== Revisions ==
The text of the first Salzburg version differs in the first and second section.

Exsultate, jubilate,
o vos animae beatae,
Summa Trinitas revelatur
et ubique adoratur,
date illi gloriam.
Summa Trias adoratur,
date illi gloriam.

Tandem advenit hora,
qua Deum colimus in spiritu et veritate,
et nomen illius magnum in omni loco est.
Debitum jam illi sit sacrificium;
sed per Mariam accedamus
in fide ad fontem gratiae,
ad thronum misericordiae,
ut magis acceptabile sit obsequium.

Rejoice, resound with joy,
o you blessed souls,
the Great Trinity is revealed
and everywhere adored;
give It glory.
The Great Triad is adored,
give It glory.

At last the hour has come
when we worship God in spirit and in truth,
and His name is great in every place.
Now let the due sacrifice be made to Him;
but through Mary let us approach
in faith the source of Grace,
the throne of Mercy,
so that our obedience [or service] may be more acceptable.

The second Salzburg version differs from the previous only in the first section.

Exsultate, jubilate,
o vos animae beatae,
Caro factus, factus homo ubique adoratur;
date illi gloriam.
Summa Trias adoratur,
date illi gloriam.

Rejoice, resound with joy,
o you blessed souls,
[He who was] made flesh, made man is everywhere adored;
give Him glory.
The Great Triad is adored,
give It glory.

== Recordings ==
- On Great Mass in C minor, K. 427, 1990 CD and DVD, Arleen Auger, Bavarian Radio Symphony Orchestra, Leonard Bernstein conducting

CD recordings on period instruments include:

- Emma Kirkby, Christopher Hogwood, Academy of Ancient Music. Mozart. Label: l'Oiseau-Lyre, 1983. Salzburg version.
- Rosmarie Hofmann, Peter Sigrist, Orchestra of the Schola Cantorum Basiliensis. Mozart. Motetten für Sologesang und Orchester. Label: MD&G, 1989.
- Barbara Bonney, Nikolaus Harnoncourt, Concentus Musicus Wien. Mozart. Label: Teldec, released 1990.
- Aris Christofellis, Flavio Colusso, Ensemble Seicentonovecento. Les Castrats au temps de Mozart. Label: EMI, 1994-1995. Alleluia movement only.
- Doris Hagel, Doris Hagel, Capella Weilburgensis. Mozart. Label: Profil, 2004.
- Carolyn Sampson, Robert King, The King's Consort. Mozart. Exsultate jubilate!. Label: Hyperion Records, 2005.
- Michael Maniaci, Martin Pearlman, Boston Baroque. Mozart. Arias for Male Soprano. Label: Telarc, 2009.
- Danielle de Niese, Charles Mackerras, Orchestra of the Age of Enlightenment. Mozart. The Mozart Album. Label: Decca Classics, released 2009.
- Susan Gritton, Andrew Nethsingha, St John’s Sinfonia. Mozart. Label: Chandos Records, 2011.
- Julia Lezhneva, Giovanni Antonini, Il Giardino Armonico. Vivaldi, Handel, Porpora, Mozart. Label: Decca Classics, 2012.
- Teresa Wakim, Harry Christophers, Handel and Haydn Society. Haydn, Mozart. Coronation Mass. Label: Coro, 2012.
- Carolyn Sampson, Masaaki Suzuki, Bach Collegium Japan. Mozart. Label: BIS Records, 2015. Version with flutes.
- Francesca Lombardi Mazzulli, Marcello Scandelli, Ensemble Autarena. Carlo Lenzi, Mozart. Sacred Music in Lombardy 1770-80. Label: Pan Classics, 2015.
- Aksel Rykkvin, Nigel Short, Orchestra of the Age of Enlightenment. Bach, Handel, Mozart. Aksel!: Arias by Bach, Handel & Mozart. Label: Signum Classics, 2016. Alleluia movement only.
- Tara Erraught, Peter Whelan, Irish Baroque Orchestra. Pierre van Maldere, Thomas Arne, Tommas Tommaso Giordani, Johann Christian Fischer, J. C. Bach, Mozart. The Trials of Tenducci: A Castrato in Ireland. Label: Linn, 2020.
- Robin Johannsen, Giulio Prandi, Coro e Orchestra Ghislieri. J. C. Bach, Mozart, Giovanni Andrea Fioroni, Melchiorre Chiesa. Mozart in Milan: Sacred Music around the Exsultate, jubilate. Label: Arcana, 2022.
