= Franziska Gottwald =

German opera singer

- Born: 1971 (age 53–54); Marburg, West Germany
- Occupation: Classical mezzo-soprano
- Organizations: Deutsches Nationaltheater Weimar
- Awards: International Bach Competition

Franziska Gottwald (born in Marburg) is a German mezzo-soprano singer in opera and concert.

== Career ==
Franziska Gottwald received her first voice training at the age of 16 with Eugen Rabine and studied voice at the Academies of Music in Saarbrücken, Hannover and Weimar. She has appeared at the Staatsoper Hannover as a guest artist and has been a member of the ensemble of the Deutsches Nationaltheater Weimar from 1998 for four years, singing parts such as Hänsel in Hänsel und Gretel, Cherubino in Le nozze di Figaro and Frau Reich in Die lustigen Weiber von Windsor. In 2004, she appeared at the Komische Oper Berlin in Don Quijote de la Mancha of Hans Zender. In 2006, she sang at La Fenice the role of Licida in L'Olimpiade of Baldassare Galuppi, conducted by Andrea Marcon. In 2007, she sang the role of Fernando (Hernán Cortés) in Ferrara (and later on tour) in the first modern live staging of Vivaldi's opera seria Motezuma, at that time just rediscovered and partly reconstructed. In this production Alan Curtis conducted his orchestra Il Complesso Barocco.

She has performed as a concert singer since 2001, notably in the field of historically informed performance. She collaborated with Reinhard Goebel and the ensemble Musica Antiqua Köln and took part in the project of Ton Koopman to record the complete vocal works of Johann Sebastian Bach with the Amsterdam Baroque Orchestra & Choir.

In 2002, she was awarded first prize in the category voice at the XIII International Bach Competition of Leipzig.
