= L'Olimpiade (Pergolesi) =

1735 opera by Giovanni Battista Pergolesi

- Opera seria by G. B. Pergolesi
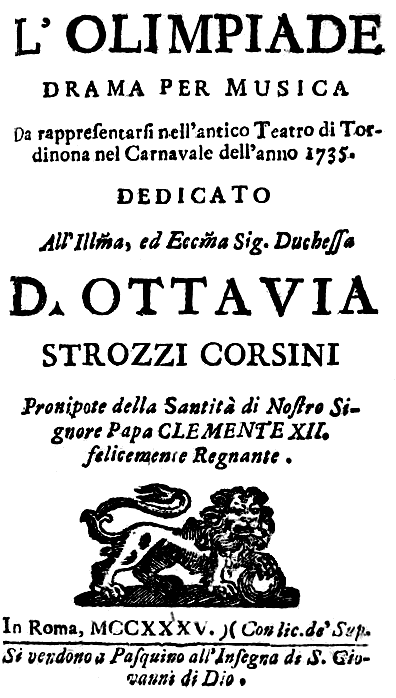
- Title page of the printed libretto
- Librettist: Pietro Metastasio
- Language: Italian
- Based on: L'Olimpiade
- Premiere: 1735; Teatro Tordinona, Rome

L'Olimpiade is an opera in the form of a dramma per musica in three acts by the Italian composer Giovanni Battista Pergolesi. Pergolesi took the text, with a few modifications, from the libretto of the same name by Pietro Metastasio. The opera first appeared during the Carnival season of 1735 at the Teatro Tordinona in Rome and "came to be probably the most admired" of the more than 50 musical settings of Metastasio's drama.

It is regarded as "one of the finest opere serie of the early eighteenth century".

== Background ==
The new Bourbon dynasty which had taken power in Naples in May 1734 probably regarded Pergolesi with suspicion because of his links with the aristocratic circles of the previous Austrian Viceroyalty. Perhaps as a result of these suspicions, or simply because of the box office failure of his opera Adriano in Siria (produced the same year at the Teatro San Bartolomeo and even appreciated, it was said, by the new king Charles VII), Pergolesi was not invited to participate in the 1735 theatrical season in Naples. He consequently decided to accept a commission from the Teatro Tordinona in Rome to compose an opera to open the Carnival season with a libretto recently written by Metastasio which had already been set to music by Antonio Caldara in 1733 and Antonio Vivaldi in 1734.

The Teatro Tordinona was a long-established theatre with its roots in the 17th century, which had recently been rebuilt and was the property of the Apostolic Camera: the precarious financial conditions in which it operated certainly made it no rival for the Neapolitan theatres with which Pergolesi had worked until that point. Metastasio was annoyed that the chorus had to be cut completely because the theatre could not afford one, while its company of singers enjoyed no great reputation. The papal prohibition on women participating on stage in Rome determined the proliferation of castrati, who also performed the female roles; five members of the cast belonged to this category, the remaining two parts being given to tenors. Two of the castrati had sung in the premiere of Vivaldi's L'Olimpiade in Venice: Marianino Nicolini was promoted from the minor character Aminta to the "prima donna" role of Aristea, while Francesco Bilancioni (or Bilanzoni) exchanged the role of Megacle for Licida. For the leading man the theatre turned to an outstanding singer from the Sistine Chapel, Domenico Ricci, who had permission to take part in theatrical performances in Rome. The principal tenor role was handed to the experienced baritenor Giovanni Battista Pinacci, who had enjoyed a career lasting twenty years and had recently returned from London where he had performed in Handel operas; the second lady was sung by the young castrato Giovanni Tedeschi, later to become famous in the 1760s as the impresario of the Teatro San Carlo. The rest of the cast was made up of two obscure comprimario singers, Nicola Licchesi (Lucchesi?), a tenor, and Carlo Brunetti, a contralto (the only singer with this vocal register among the group of high voices), who were nevertheless gratified by the extra attention Pergolesi paid their roles in his score. If the chorus was absent and the singers were of no great reputation, the orchestra was "more sizeable than the Neapolitan orchestras of the time, as demonstrated by the use of two trumpets and two hunting horns, sometimes simultaneously."

== Performance history ==
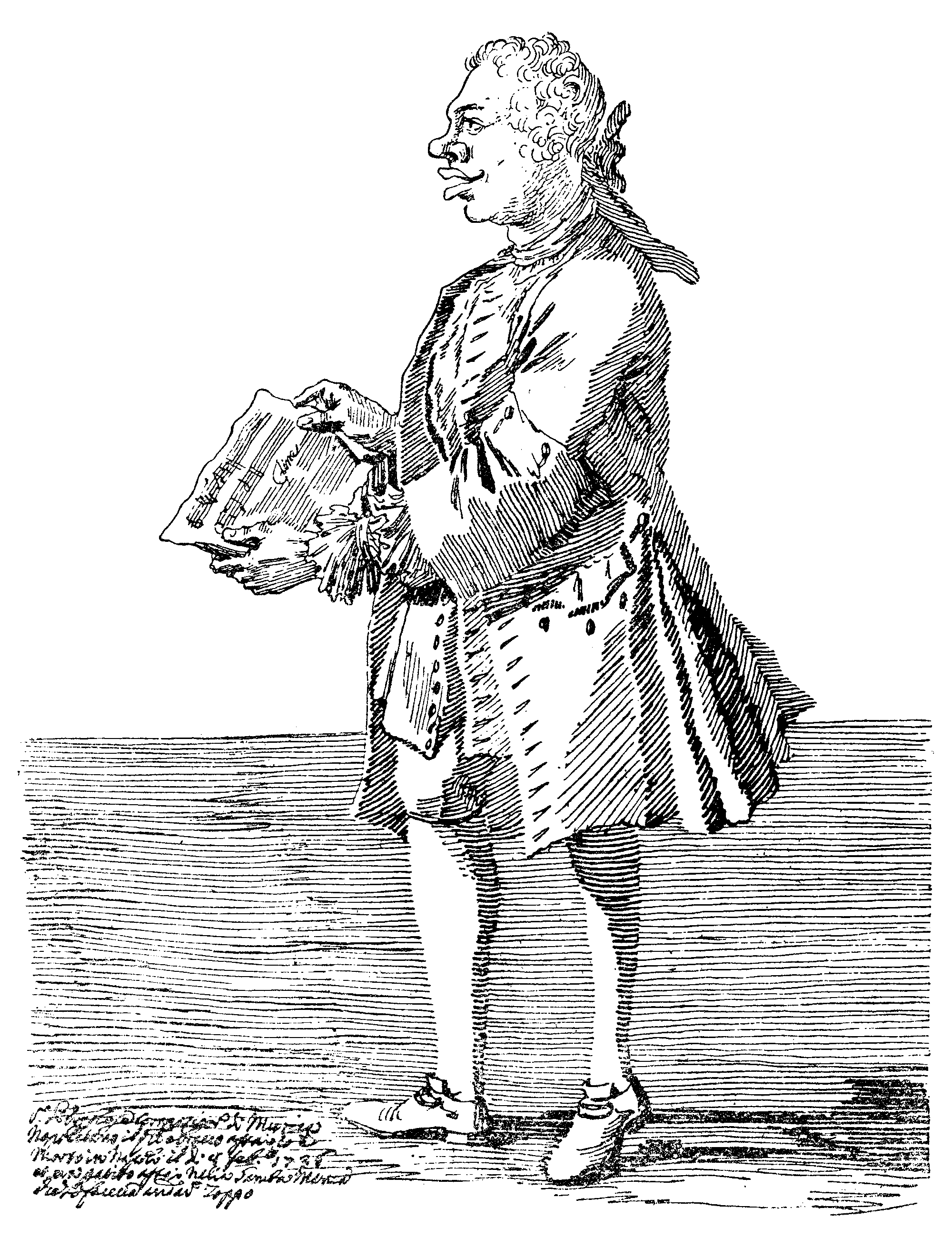
Caricature of Pergolesi

The opera made its debut in January 1735 as the first opera of the season, and had a rather troubled time because official mourning for the death of Princess Maria Clementina Sobieska, wife of the pretender to the British throne James Stuart, led to theatrical performances being suspended between the 17th and 23 January while the subsequent closure of the theatres for Candlemas prevented extra performances before the second opera of the season, Francesco Ciampi's Demofoonte, took the stage. No reviews of the premiere exist. The only account we have comes from what the composer Egidio Duni, Pergolesi's rival, told his colleague André Grétry decades later, namely that the performance was a total fiasco, so much so that during the disputes it provoked Pergolesi was hit on the head by an orange thrown by an angry member of the audience. Nevertheless, the opera rapidly won international fame and "over the next ten years Pergolesi's music all but monopolized L'Olimpiade pasticcios throughout Europe." Productions based on Pergolesi's setting were performed in various cities: in Perugia and Cortona in 1738, in Siena in 1741, perhaps in Florence in 1737, certainly in London in 1742, where the pasticcio presented at the King's Theatre under the title of Meraspe was largely based on Pergolesi's score (with the addition of four or five arias by Giuseppe Scarlatti, Leonardo Leo and Giovanni Battista Lampugnani), and left a lasting impression in the years to come.

The widespread diffusion of Pergolesi's L'Olimpiade is attested by the unusual number of manuscripts (more than twenty) of the score which have survived: this opera, along with La serva padrona and the Stabat Mater, provided the basis for Pergolesi's lasting fame across Europe. A performance of his version of the aria "Se cerca, se dice" had – according to Charles Burney – made an impression "seldom" equalled on the English public. In the second half of the 18th century the aria became "a touchstone for all subsequent composers [...] The success of the aria was such that it was still being parodied decades later, even in slightly vulgar ways", as for example in I due supposti conti by Cimarosa in 1784, where a character who has just swallowed a powerful laxative leaves the stage singing "Se cerca, se dice:/'Il conte dov'è?'/rispondi che il conte/correndo partì" ("If she comes looking, if she comes saying/'Where's the count?'/Answer that the count/Has had to make a quick exit"). As late as the 1810s Stendhal dedicated an impassioned analysis to it in his letters on Metastasio, remarking: "the whole of Italy knows [this] aria by heart, and this is probably why L'Olimpiade is not revived. No director would dare run the risk of staging an opera whose main aria was already lodged deep in the memory of every member of the audience."

In the modern era, after a short-lived revival at the Teatro della Fortuna in Fano and the Teatro Pergolesi in Jesi to mark the bicentenary of Pergolesi's death (scheduled for 1936, but postponed until 1937), and a couple of performances in Germany, L'Olimpiade did not appear again until it was given in concert form in 1992 as part of the IV International Festival of Gerace at the local church of San Francesco. This performance was the basis for the world premiere recording of the opera. A second series of performances took place in 1996 conducted by William Christie at various French venues including the Théâtre du Châtelet in Paris. The first staged performances in the 21st century took place in 2003 in several historical theatres of Emilia-Romagna (Modena, Parma, Piacenza and Reggio Emilia), conducted by Ottavio Dantone in a production by Italo Nunziata. The opera has appeared several times since then. Unitel Classics made a video recording of the "magnificent" version presented in 2011 at the Festival Pergolesi Spontini in Jesi, conducted by Alessandro De Marchi with a production again by Italo Nunziata.

== Structure ==
L'Olimpiade consists of the following musical items:

- An opening sinfonia
- 24 arias
- A duet
- A march
- A final quartet
- Secco recitatives
- An accompanied recitative

The arias are usually accompanied by strings alone; in six of them the orchestra is expanded by the use of oboes and horns, in three others trumpets are added. This enlarged orchestra also takes part in the sinfonia.

As was the practice in Rome, the setting of Metastasio's libretto is reasonably faithful to the original: apart from the unavoidable suppression of the choruses mentioned above, Pergolesi limited himself to introducing only four additional arias and one substitute aria. These are primarily arias for the two comprimari, not catered for in Metastasio's text, namely "Talor guerriero invitto” for Aminta in the first act, and "Apportator son io" and "L'infelice in questo stato" for Alcandro in the second and third acts respectively. In the third scene of Act 3 the aria Metastasio wrote for Megacle, "Lo seguitai felice", was replaced by a few lines of recitative and a long bravura aria "Torbido in volto e nero" with a divided orchestra. In the sixth scene, as the action draws to a close, a moving additional aria was also inserted for Licida, "Nella fatal mia sorte".

== Self-borrowings ==
With the exception of the last named aria the music for the other modifications derives from self-borrowings from Adriano in Siria, partly enriched with extra instrumentation: the text is mimicked in the three arias for the comprimari and copied word for word in the substitute piece for Megacle. Pergolesi also used music from Adriano to set the original Metastasian verses in Aminta's second aria (Act 3), "Son qual per mare ignoto".

Other music is shared with La conversione e morte di San Guglielmo ("The Conversion and Death of Saint William"), the sacred opera the composer had written as a final exercise as part of his studies at the Conservatorio dei Poveri di Gesǜ Cristo. In particular, this applies to the sinfonia and at least two other notable pieces, for which Metastasio's text also remained unchanged: Aristea's aria "Tu di saper procura" (which corresponds to the solo for the angel, "Fremi pur quanto vuoi") and the only duet, placed at the end of the first act, "Ne' giorni tuoi felici", between Megacle and Aristea (which corresponds to the duet "Di pace e di contento" between Saint William and Father Arsenio). Given that the holograph score of the earlier work by Pergolesi has not survived, it is even possible that it is not a case of L'Olimpiade borrowing from Guglielmo but rather the reverse, with the reuse of music from L'Olimpiade in later Neapolitan revivals of the other piece, attested by the scores of Guglielmo which have come down to us. Whatever the case, the duet was highly celebrated throughout the 18th century and continues to be admired in the modern era. In particular, it has been written that the duet shows that "Pergolesi was a musical dramatist to the finger tips, not merely an effective setter of words". In it:

the tenderly 'speaking' melody that bears the true current of feeling backwards and forwards between Aristea and Megacle, is periodically racked by spasms of angular chromaticism that depict them on the verge of losing self-control, or broken down into dialogue of opera-buffa-like verisimilitude.

== Critical appraisal ==
In spite of the heterogenous character the opera might have assumed as a result of such a composition history, Raffaele Mellace echoes the remarks of the historian of 18th-century musical drama Reinhard Strohm when he writes in his article on L'Olimpiade in the Dizionario dell'Opera 2008:

What strikes the listener, beyond any dissimilarity between the various numbers in the score, is the essentially unified character of the musical invention: an atmosphere of warm, joyous freshness breathes from every single page of the opera, reaching as far as the arias for minor characters and even the march in the third act. It offers an interpretation of the text which is completely in harmony with Metastasio's poetry and the exaltation of youth and love particular to this drama. The "pathetic" moments are short and few in number in an opera which resolves even the most emotionally lacerating situations with a grace which perfectly captures the expressive medium of the poet's verse, treated with extraordinary sensitivity in the declamation.

Strohm himself summarised the historical significance of L'Olimpiade in his book on Italian opera of the 18th century:

Pergolesi's L'Olimpiade represents one of the happy moments in the history of opera. The literary masterpiece of a Metastasio at the peak of his art (he was barely 35 when he wrote it) found its first musical flowering at the hands of the young composer from Jesi. Many of those who praised the libretto did so thinking unconsciously of Pergolesi's melodies. In his score, L'Olimpiade is a homage to youth and love of the kind which perhaps can only be completely successful in musical drama.

== Roles ==
Role	Voice type	Premiere cast
Clistene	tenor	Giovanni Battista Pinacci
Aristea	soprano castrato (en travesti)	Mariano Nicolini ("Marianino")
Argene	soprano castrato (en travesti)	Giovanni Tedeschi ("Amadori")
Licida	soprano castrato	Francesco Bilancioni (o Bilanzoni)
Megacle	soprano castrato	Domenico Ricci ("Menicuccio")
Aminta	tenor	Nicola Licchesi
Alcandro	contralto castrato	Carlo Brunetti

== Synopsis ==
For an outline of the plot see the article on Metastasio's libretto.

== Recordings ==
=== Audio ===
Year	Cast (in the following order: Clistene, Aristea, Argene, Licida, Megacle, Aminta, Alcandro)	Conductor, Orchestra, Note	Label
complete recordings
1992	Ernesto Palacio, María Angeles Peters, Giovanna Manci, Adelaida Negri, Lucetta Bizzi; Raimundo Mettre; Irena Zaric	Marco Armiliato, Filarmonica de Stat Transilvania di Cluj (live recording)	CD: Arkadia «Akademia»; Agorá Musica Catalog.: 93; New Ornamenti
2011	Jeffrey Francis, Raffaella Milanesi, Ann-Beth Solvang, Jennifer Rivera, Olga Pasishnyk; Marcus Brutscher; Martin Oro	Alessandro De Marchi, Academia Montis Regalis (live recording on period instruments, Innsbruck, 2010)	CD: Deutsche Harmonia Mundi Catalog.: 88697807712

=== Video ===
Year	Cast (in the following order: Clistene, Aristea, Argene, Licida, Megacle, Aminta, Alcandro)	Conductor, Orchestra, Stage director	Label
2013	Raul Gimenez, Lyubov Petrova, Yetzabel Arias Fernandez, Jennifer Rivera, Sofia Soloviy, Antonio Lozano, Milena Storti	Alessandro De Marchi, Academia Montis Regalis (period instruments), Italo Nunziata	Arthaus: Catalog.: 108 064 (Blu-ray); Catalog.: 101 650 (DVD)

== Sources ==
- Original libretto: (in Italian) L'Olimpiade. Drama per musica da rappresentarsi nell'antico teatro di Tordinona nel carnavale dell'anno 1735. Dedicato all'illustrissima ed eccellentissima signora duchessa donna Ottavia Strozzi Corsini, pronipote della santità di nostro signore papa Clemente XII, felicemente regnante, Rome, 1735 (accessible online in transcription at Varianti all'opera – Università degli studi di Milano, Padova e Siena)
- (in Italian) Salvatore Caruselli (editor), Grande enciclopedia della musica lirica, Longanesi & C. Periodici S.p.A., Rome
- Gabriele Catalucci and Fabio Maestri, introductory notes to the audio recording of San Guglielmo Duca d'Aquitania, issued by Bongiovanni, Bologna, 1989, GB 2060/61-2
- (in Italian) Rodolfo Celletti, Storia dell'opera italiana, Milan, Garzanti, 2000, ISBN 9788847900240.
- (in Italian) Fabrizio Dorsi and Giuseppe Rausa, Storia dell'opera italiana, Turin, Paravia Bruno Mondadori, 2000, ISBN 978-88-424-9408-9
- (in German) Helmut Hucke, Pergolesi: Probleme eines Werkverzeichnisses, "Acta musicologica", 52 (1980), n. 2, pp. 195–225: 208.
- Helmut Hucke and Dale E. Monson, Pergolesi, Giovanni Battista, in Stanley Sadie, op.cit., III, pp. 951–956
- David Kimbell, Italian Opera, Cambridge, Cambridge University Press, 1994 (paperback), p. 257 ff., ISBN 0-521-23533-2
- (in Italian) Raffaele Mellace, Olimpiade, L', in Piero Gelli and Filippo Poletti (editors), Dizionario dell'opera 2008, Milan, Baldini Castoldi Dalai, 2007, pp. 924–926, ISBN 978-88-6073-184-5 (reproduced at Opera Manager)
- (in Italian) Francesca Menchelli-Buttini, Fra musica e drammaturgia: l'Olimpiade di Metastasio-Pergolesi, "Studi musicali" (Accademia Nazionale di Santa Cecilia), Nuova serie, I, 2010, n. 2, pp. 389–430 (accessible online at Academia.edu)
- Dale E. Monson, Olimpiade, L' (ii), in Stanley Sadie, op.cit., III, p. 663
- Stanley Sadie (editor), The New Grove Dictionary of Opera, New York, Grove (Oxford University Press), 1997, ISBN 978-0-19-522186-2
- (in French) Stendhal, Vies de Haydn, de Mozart et de Métastase (nouvelle édition entièrement revue), Paris, Levy, 1854, pp. 286 ff. (accessible for free online at Internet Archive)
- (in Italian) Reinhard Strohm, L'opera italiana nel Settecento, Venice, Marsilio, 1991, ISBN 88-317-6586-8 (in particular see the chapter entitled: Giovanni Battista Pergolesi: L'olimpiade (Roma 1735), pp. 214–227)
- (in Italian) Claudio Toscani, Pergolesi, Giovanni Battista, in Dizionario Biografico degli Italiani, Volume 82, 2015 (accessible online at Treccani.it)
- This article contains material translated from the equivalent article in the Italian Wikipedia.
