= Pervin Chakar =

Kurdish-Turkish opera singer (born 1981)

Pervin Chakar Pervîn Çakar
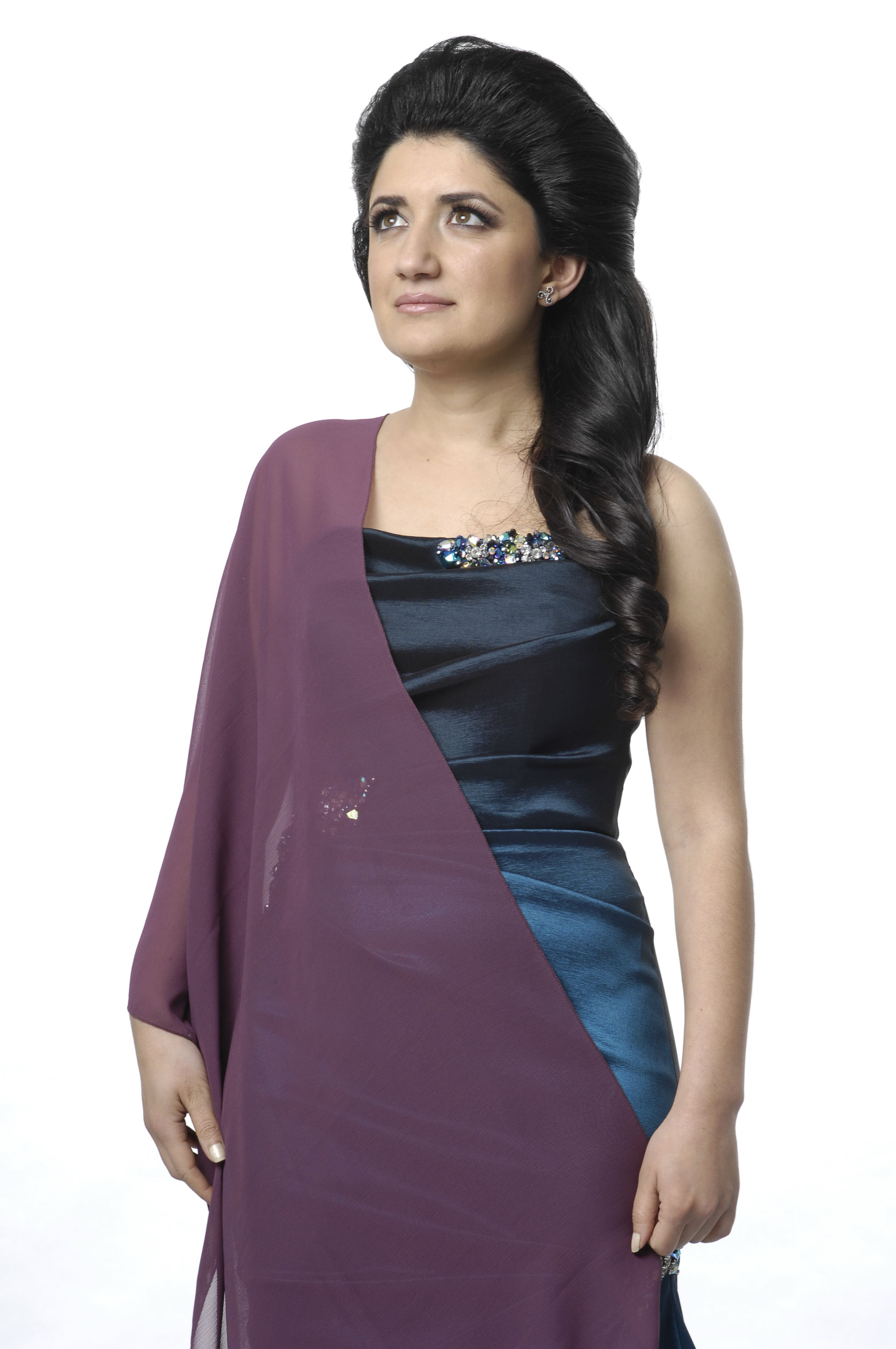

Background information
- Born: June 19, 1981 (age 45); Mardin, Turkey
- Occupation: Opera singer

Pervin Chakar (Kurdish: Pervîn Çakar, born June 19, 1981) is a Kurdish-Turkish opera singer. Having been trained as a singer in Turkey and Italy, she currently resides in Germany.

== Early life and education ==
Chakar was born into a Kurdish family from Mardin, Turkey, in 1981 and attended the fine arts high school in Amed (Diyarbakır), where she also took cello lessons. During her studies at the Anatolian High School, she took up writing and with one of her stories she participated in a competition in Ankara. At the competitions party she was singing the song "Ich liebe Dich" (I love you) by Ludwig van Beethoven, then one of the jurors gave her a CD of the opera singer Maria Callas. Listening to Callas inspired her to pursue a career as a soprano. She graduated with a bachelor's degree from the Gazi University in Ankara in 2003, becoming a singing teacher. She decided to follow up on her studies in Italy in 2004 when an Italian opera manager invited her to enroll into the Conservatorio Francesco Morlacchi in Perugia from where she graduated with a master's degree.

== Professional career ==
During her eleven-year stay in Italy she performed for the first time at the Rosetum in Milan in 2006. Later she sang as Rosina in The Barber of Seville, Tytania in Britten's A Midsummer Night's Dream, Megacles in the L'Olympiade by Josef Mysliveček. She has sung in several languages of the ancient Mesopotamia such as Armenian, Kurdish, Zazaki and performed Kurdish folksongs from the Ottoman Armenian composer Komitas for his 150th anniversary in the Cemal Reşit Rey Concert Hall in Istanbul. Since 2016 she lives in Baden-Baden, Germany.

=== On singing in the Kurdish language ===
She has only in 2011 decided to learn the Kurdish language, after having been confronted with news on the Roboski massacre in which several Kurdish villagers were killed and mistaken for militants of the Kurdistan Workers' Party (PKK). From then on, she learned songs from Kurdish singers and became a strong supporter of performing in the Kurdish language also having composed a melody to the Kurdish poem Qimil by Musa Anter.

In 2022, Chakar claimed that her concert at Mardin Artuklu University, which opened the first Kurdish course in Turkey, was cancelled because there were Kurdish songs in her repertoire. A former lawmaker of the Justice and Development Party (AKP) Abdurrahman Kurt attempted to weigh with the University's rector, but was not able to change their mind. The Turkish daily Yeni Şafak claimed that the reason given for the cancellation was that she wanted a ticketed event in a hall meant for free concerts. Students that went to a Spring festival organized by the same university posted videos of artists singing in Kurdish, contradicting her claim.
