= Capella Cracoviensis =

Polish musical group

Coordinates: 50°03′32″N 19°55′57″E

- Music ensemble and choir
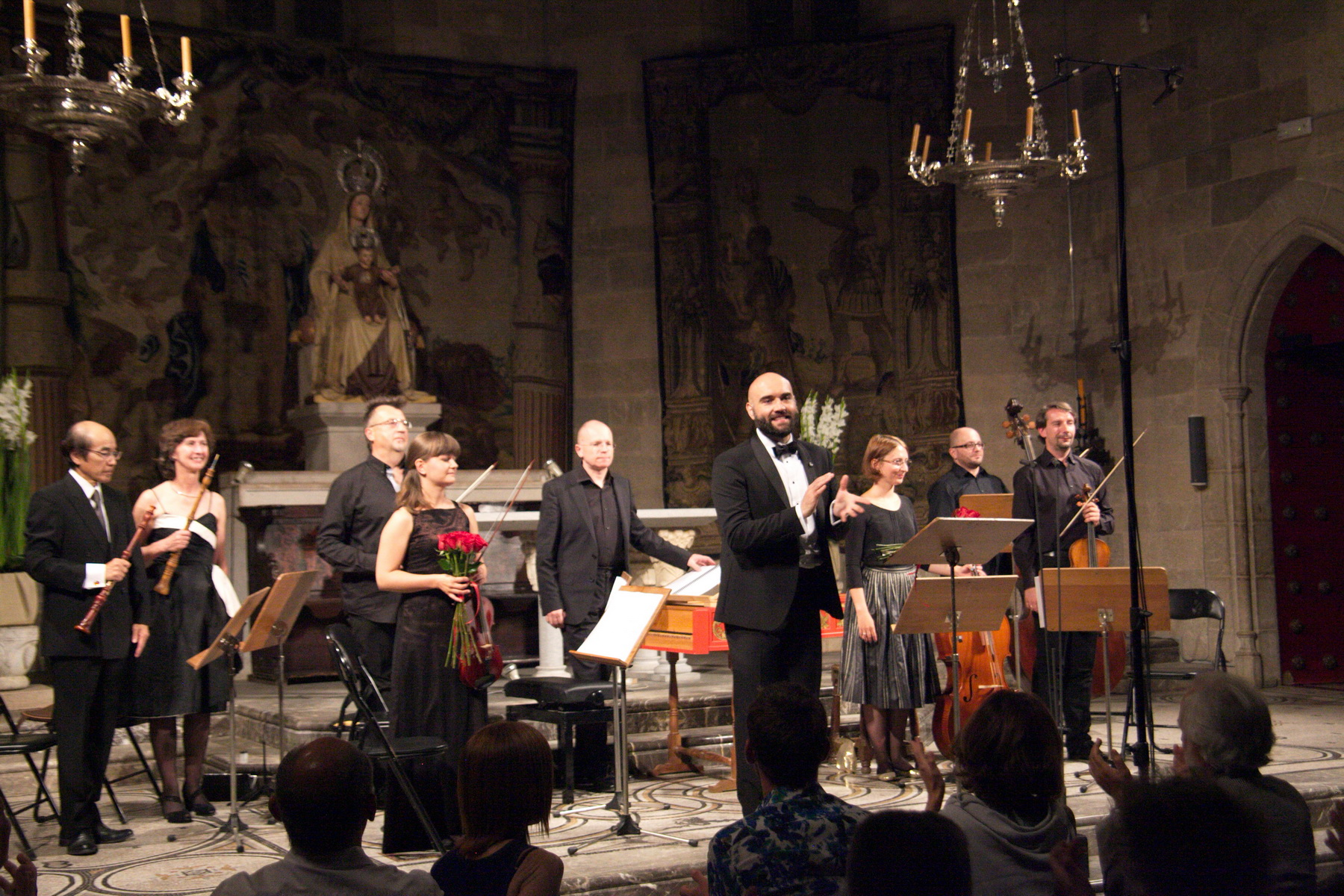
- Capella Cracoviensis backing the countertenor Xavier Sabata at 2016 Peralada Festival
- Founded: 1970
- Location: Kraków
- Concert hall: Krakow Philharmonic Hall
- Website: capellacracoviensis.pl

Capella Cracoviensis is a period instrument ensemble and a chamber choir based in Kraków, Poland. It was formed in 1970 by composer and music conductor Stanisław Gałoński (b. 1936), its first director and general manager. Capella Cracoviensis specializes in early music, Renaissance polyphonies, Polish Baroque, and classical chamber music played on period instruments, as well as oratorios, and operatic scores including works of Mozart.

== Profile ==
Capella Cracoviensis (CC) has made numerous CD recordings over the years, most notably of the J. S. Bach Mass in B minor, W. A. Mozart Coronation Mass, and of Darius Milhaud's 6 chamber symphonies and 3 Opéras-Minutes. The group performed in many European countries including in the United States, Canada, Japan, South Korea and Taiwan, with the concert held for John Paul II at the Vatican on April 9, 2000, upon his return from the pilgrimage to Bethlehem.

The ensemble's performances feature instrumentalists and singers acclaimed in Poland and abroad. Its guest performers as well as concertmasters included Alessandro Moccia of the Orchestre des Champs-Élysées, Alberto Stevanin (Il Giardino Armonico, I Barocchisti of Ravenna, Ensemble Matheus), Fabio Ravasi (Europa Galante), Peter Hanson (Orchestre Revolutionnaire et Romantique); conductors Paul Goodwin, Andrew Parrott, Andreas Spering, Paul McCreesh, Roy Goodman, Fabio Bonizzoni, Matteo Messori and others. The orchestra works on projects with other early music companies such as Nachtmusique and Oltremontano.

In 1992 the company received two prestigious awards for their recordings of Milhaud: the French Diapason d'Or, and Grand Prix du Disque of the Académie Charles Cros. In 2008 a new director was appointed by the city, and a period of transition followed. The orchestra received nearly two million zlotys in new-project sponsorship money from the Polish Ministry of Culture in 2011, which is a record for music locally. The funds helped them launch the Verba et Voces festival of early music featuring international stars such as Kai Wessel. The CC produced grand oratorios by Handel (Theodora, Athalia, and Deborah), as well as Le nozze di Figaro by Mozart, along with a series of great Masses and Polish Baroque concerts across the region, which were free of charge.

Handel - Athalia oratorio (HWV 52)
Music sample from the CC stage performance

Music director Jan Tomasz Adamus stirred considerable controversy in January 2011 when he requested that all of the CC instrumentalists switch from standard to period instruments, or leave the group if they did not. Eight senior members were dismissed, and organized a street-level protest backed by the union committee, but the changeover has proved beneficial for the company. The CC has experienced a music revival since it switched to old instruments, resulting in renewed interest among the general public and some enthusiastic reviews from the critics (Gazeta.pl; Wyborcza.pl).

Currently its repertoire ranges from Renaissance polyphony to early Romantic operas performed on period instruments. CC has been hosted at many important festivals and concerts halls, including Concertgebouw Amsterdam, Bachfest Leipzig, Händel Festspiele Halle, Opéra Royal Versailles and Theater an der Wien. The ensemble has already performed with such eminent guest conductors as Christophe Rousset, Giuliano Carmignola, Paul Goodwin, Andrew Parrott and Paul McCreesh. The most significant achievements of CC include the first performance of Wagner’s works on historical instruments with the participation of Waltraud Meier and the recording of the operas by Pergolesi and Porpora for Decca Records, as well as Moniuszko's Halka for Sony Classical. The Erato recording of Vivaldi's 'Stabat Mater' performed by Jakub Józef Orlinski, Capella Cracoviensis and Jan Tomasz Adamus received the Opus Klassik 2022 award. In May 2018, the ensemble launched a project Haydn - the complete symphonies which aim is to perform and record live Haydn's entire symphonic oeuvre. From 2022, it has also become the main organiser of the Opera Rara Kraków festival.

== Selected recordings ==
- 2013 "Bach Rewrite" (Marcin Masecki, Piotr Orzechowski, conducted by Jan Tomasz Adamus). Decca
- 2014 M.-A. Charpentier, Te Deum H.146, J.-B. Lully, Te Deum, Le Poème Harmonique & Capella Cracoviensis, conducted by Vincent Dumestre. Alpha
- 2015 "Karłowicz – Serenada 1896". iteratio
- 2015 J. S. Bach "Motets" (conducted by Fabio Bonizzoni). Alpha
- 2016 G. B. Pergolesi "Adriano in Siria" (Franco Fagioli, Romina Basso, Juan Sancho, conducted by Jan Tomasz Adamus). Decca
- 2017 "Chopin Schubert" (Mariusz Klimsiak, conducted by Jan Tomasz Adamus). Avi
- 2018 N. Porpora "Germanico in Germania" (Max Emanuel Cenčić, Julia Lezhneva, Juan Sancho, conducted by Jan Tomasz Adamus). Decca
- 2018 G. F. Händel "The Seven Deadly Sins" (Juan Sancho, conducted by Jan Tomasz Adamus). Enchiriadis
- 2019 "Adam Jarzębski et consortes" (Agnieszka Świątkowska). iteratio
- 2019 W. A. Mozart "Requiem" (conducted by Jan Tomasz Adamus). Capella Cracoviensis
- 2020 G.F. Händel "Human Love. Love Divine" (Nuria Rial, Juan Sancho, conducted by Jan Tomasz Adamus). Deutsche Harmonia Mundi / Sony Classical
- 2021 S. Moniuszko "Halka" (Natalia Rubiś, Sebastian Szumski, Przemysław Borys, conducted by Jan Tomasz Adamus). Deutsche Harmonia Mundi / Sony Classical
- 2022 A. Vivaldi "Stabat Mater" (Jakub Józef Orliński, conducted by Jan Tomasz Adamus). Erato

== See also ==
- Warsaw Philharmonic
