= Academia Montis Regalis =

Italian orchestra

The Fondazione Academia Montis Regalis is an Italian cultural foundation promoting baroque and classical orchestral training based in the town of Mondovì since 1992. In 1994 it was recognised as a non-profit organisation Organizzazione non lucrative di utilità sociale (Onlus) by the Piedmont Region.

The orchestra has been directed by conductors including Luigi Mangiocavallo Alessandro De Marchi and Enrico Onofri.

== History ==
The Foundation Academia Montis Regalis was founded in 1992 in Mondovì, Italy, where it has its current headquarters. In 1994 the Foundation created the Academia Montis Regalis Orchestra to promote the Baroque and Classical repertoire from the seventeenth and eighteenth centuries according to historical criteria and by using original instruments. It soon became one of the most well-respected professional ensembles in Italy and abroad.

Since the beginning, it was conducted by the most important specialists in the Early Music field: Ton Koopman, Jordi Savall, Christopher Hogwood, Reinhardt Goebel, Monica Huggett, Luigi Mangiocavallo, Enrico Gatti, Alessandro De Marchi, to mention but a few.

The orchestra has regularly appeared in some of the most important concert institutions and festivals such as: the Unione Musicale di Torino, the Accademia Nazionale di Santa Cecilia in Rome, the Amici della Musica in Perugia, Florence and Padua, the MiTo/Settembre Musica festival in Turin, the Théâtre de l’Opera in Lille, the Théâtre Municipal in Lausanne; the Montreux Festival; the Théâtre des Champs-Elysées in Paris, the Théâtre Poissy, the Early Music Festival in Lyon; the Vancouver Festival, the Halle Festival, the Innsbruck Festival and Turin’s Teatro Regio.

The orchestra has taken part in the acclaimed Vivaldi Edition to record all of Vivaldi’s original manuscripts, held in Turin’s National Library.

The first CD recorded by the orchestra, Juditha Triumphans, conducted by Alessandro De Marchi, was a great international success. Four more recordings followed, among which the opera Orlando Finto Pazzo and a series of violin and orchestra concerts with Enrico Onofri. Successively, the orchestra recorded three oratorios from the Roman School of the beginning of the XVIIIth century, for the British label Hyperion: Haendel’s Trionfo del Tempo e del Disinganno, Alessandro Stradella’s San Giovanni Battista and Alessandro Scarlatti’s Davidis Pugna et Victoria. It has had an intense recording activity with other prestigious international labels such as OPUS 111, Naïve, Hyperion e Sony, winning many international awards, such as the Diapason d’Or, the Choque du Monde de la Musique, and the Gramophone Choice.

From 2010 to 2018 the Academia Montis Regalis has been the resident orchestra of the prestigious Innsbrucker Festwochen Festival, performing every year a Baroque opera as well as various chamber music projects. The first two operas performed at the Landestheater in Innsbruck were L’Olimpiade by Pergolesi and Flavius Bertaridus by Telemann, both acclaimed and recorded live by Sony Classics.

In 2005 the Academia Montis Regalis was awarded the prestigious Italian Music Critics’ Abbiati Prize for its artistic achievements in the field of Early Music.

== Discography ==
=== Discography - Accademia Montis Regalis ===
- 1996 - Gaetano Pugnani, Ouvertures in Eight Parts (Opus 111, OPS 30151)
- 1997 - Luigi Boccherini, Sinfonie a grande orchestra op.37 (Opus 111, OPS 30168)
- 1998 - Gaetano Pugnani, Werther melologo (Opus 111, OPS 30197/8, 2CD)
- 1999 - Giuseppe Cambini, Sinfonie (Opus 111, OPS 30244)
- 1999 - Giuseppe Giordani, Passio per il Venerdi Santo (Opus 111, OPS 30249/50, 2CD)
- 2001 - Antonio Vivaldi, Concerti per flauto traversiere (Opus 111, OP 30298)
- 2001 - Franz Joseph Haydn, L'isola disabitata (Opus 111, OPS 30319, 2CD)
- 2002 - Antonio Vivaldi, Juditha triumphans (Opus 111, OP 30314, 3CD)
- 2003 - Antonio Vivaldi, Mottetti (Opus 111, OP 30340)
- 2003 - Franz Joseph Haydn - Hummel, Concerti per tromba e orchestra (Amadeus, AM 1582)
- 2004 - Antonio Vivaldi, Orlando finto pazzo (Opus 111, 30392, 3CD)
- 2006 - Antonio Vivaldi, La Caccia concerti per violino (Opus 111, 30417)
- 2006 - Antonio Vivaldi, Concerto rustico (Berlin Classic, 17882 BC)
- 2008 - Alessandro Stradella, San Giovanni Battista (Hyperion, CDA 67617)
- 2008 - Georg Friedrich Händel, Il Trionfo del Tempo e del Disinganno (Hyperion, CDA 67681/2)
- 2009 - Alessandro Scarlatti, Davidis Pugna et victoria (Hyperion, CDA 67714)
- 2011 - Giovan Battista Pergolesi, L'Olimpiade (Deutsche Harmonia Mundi)
- 2011 - Sur les Traces de Vivaldi (In Search of Vivaldi)
- 2012 - Vivaldi: Sacred Music
- 2012 - Ladies Sing Baroque
- 2012 - Handel, Caldara: Carmelite Vespers 1709
- 2013 - Vivaldi: Concertos 2
- 2013 - Rivals: Arias for Farinelli & Co.
- 2013 - Mozart: Piano Trios, K. 548, K. 502, K. 498
- 2013 - Francesco Provenzale: La Stellidaura vendicante
- 2014 - Il Maestro: Porpora Arias, Franco Fagioli
- 2016 - Wolfgang Amadeus Mozart: La Clemenza di Tito
- 2016 - Discover Vivaldi [Berlin Classics]
- 2017 - Vivaldi: Violin Concertos
- 2017 - Handel Sonya Yoncheva
- 2017 - Carlo Francesco Cesarini: Cantatas
- 2021 - Vivaldi: Concerti Particolari, Enrico Onofri
- 2021 - Domenico Cimarosa: Il Matrimonio Segreto

=== Discography L'Astrée ===
- 1993 - Gaetano Pugnani, Pièces a Plusieurs Parties (Symphonia)
- 1996 - Felice Giardini, Cinque quartetti dedicati ai duchi di Devonshire (Opus 111, OPS 30-163)
- 2005 - Gaetano Pugnani, Sonate e trii (Stradivarius, STR 33677)
- 2007 - Georg Friedrich Händel, Sonate per violino e basso continuo (Amadeus, AM 200)
