= Musica Antiqua Köln =

Musica Antiqua Köln was an early music group that was founded in 1973 by Reinhard Goebel and fellow students from the Conservatory of Music in Cologne. Musica Antiqua Köln devoted itself largely to the performance of the music of the 17th and 18th centuries. The group recorded extensively for Archiv Produktion and received numerous awards, including the Grand Prix International du Disque, Gramophone Award, Diapason d'Or, and Grammy nominations.

The group gained popularity for its contribution to the soundtrack of the historical movie "Le Roi Danse", about the life and music of court composer Jean Baptiste Lully.

The ensemble disbanded after more than 30 years of touring, recording and performing in 2007. Reinhard Goebel has since concentrated on conducting larger orchestras in both ancient and modern repertoire. Musica Antiqua Köln's last recording for Archiv, Flute Quartets by Telemann (2005), was a collaboration with the Swiss recorder virtuoso Maurice Steger.

A final recording, Johann Friedrich Meister: Il Giardino del Piacere, forgotten by its performers and recording company, was issued in 2011. Advance publicity materials stated that its contents were recorded originally for televised broadcast in 2004.
