= Jan Tomasz Adamus =

Polish musician

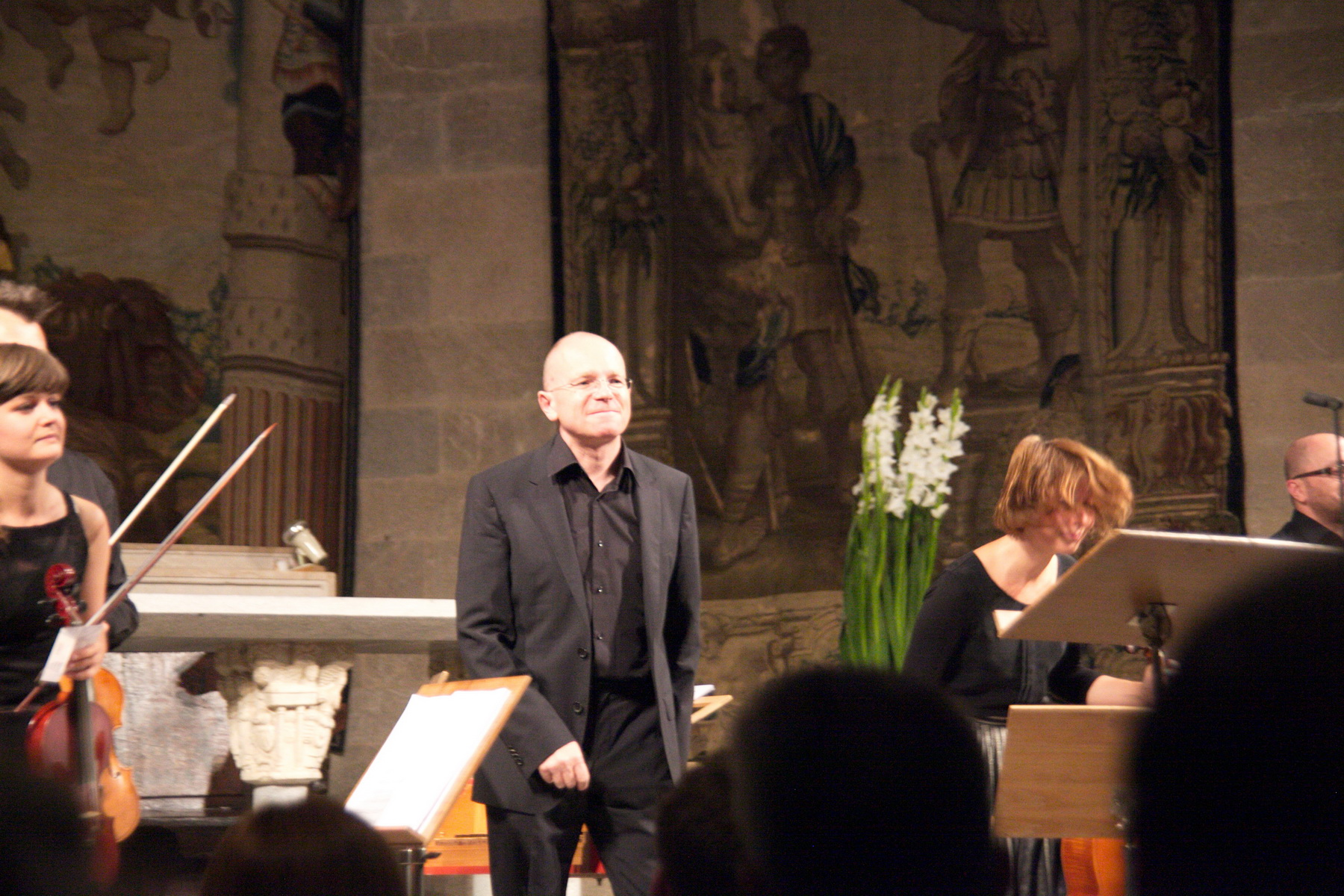
- Jan Tomasz Adamus conducting Capella Cracoviensis in Perelada Festival concert, 2016

Background information
- Born: June 16, 1968 (age 57)
- Genres: classical music
- Occupation: conductor

Jan Tomasz Adamus (born 16 June 1968) is a Polish conductor, organist, chamber musician, recording artist and music administrator. At present, Adamus serves as general and artistic director of the Kraków early music orchestra and mixed symphonic choir Capella Cracoviensis (since 2008). Adamus recorded a number of solo CD's including as conductor; with Baroque, Classical and Romantic church music – also playing different historical organs in Silesia. He serves as the artistic director of the International Bach Festival in Świdnica.

Adamus graduated from the Academy of Music in Kraków and the Conservatorium van Amsterdam (Sweelinck Conservatorium). He worked a conductor in Poland and abroad, invited by early music ensembles and various festivals to lead concerts from differing musical periods. In 1995–2008, Adamus was a lecturer at the Academy of Music in Wrocław and a guest lecturer at the University of Music and Performing Arts, Vienna (Universität für Musik und Darstellende Kunst) in Graz. Between 2003 and 2008, he was the artistic director of the Wrocław early music festival Forum Musicum, and from 2005 to 2008 a consultant to the International Festival Wratislavia Cantans.

== Selected recordings ==
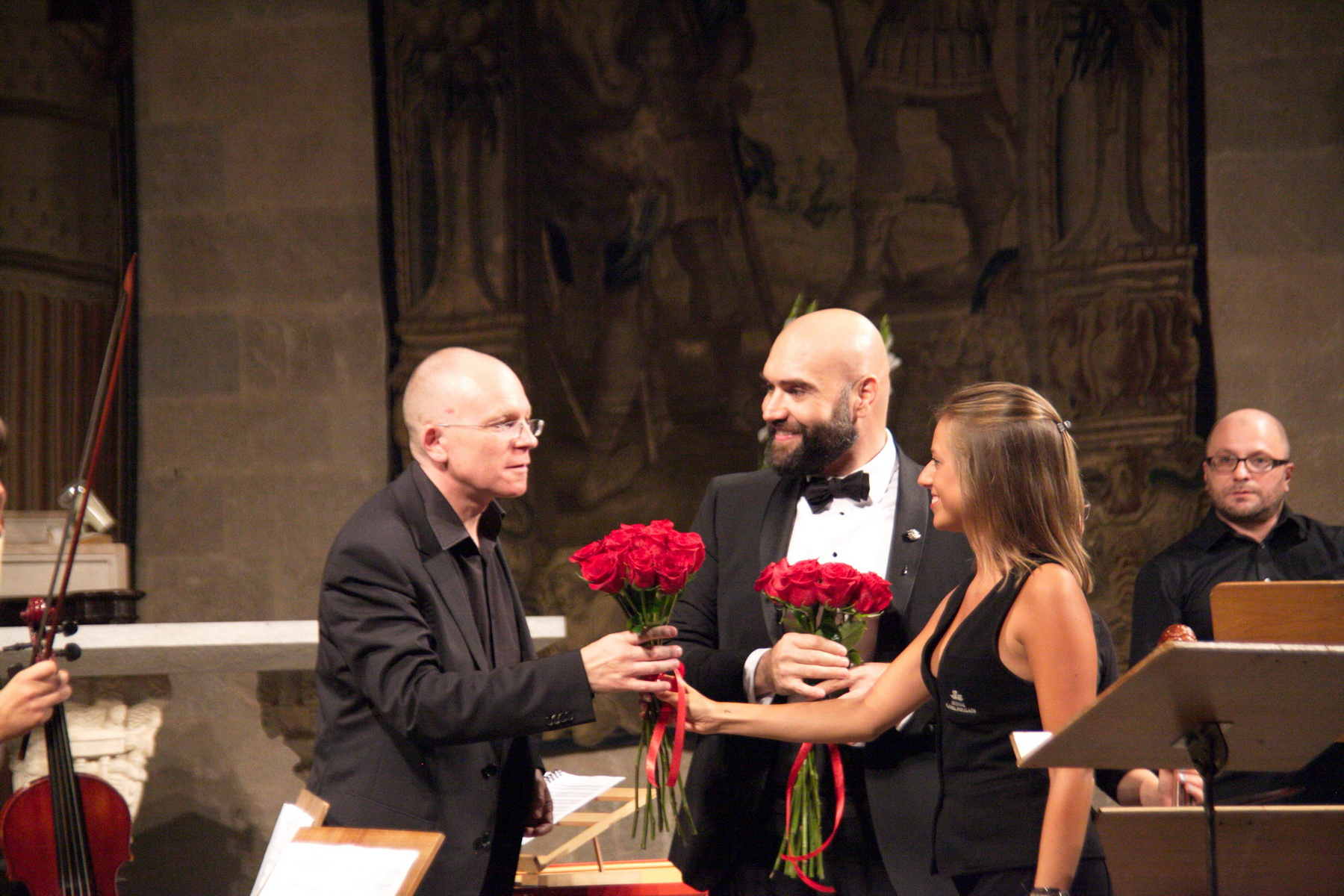
Jan Tomasz Adamus (left) with Xavier Sabata in Peralada Festival (2016)

- Muzyka Dawnej Europy: Niemcy - Polska Audio CD. Performer
- Harmonologia - Muzyka W Dawnym Wroclawiu Audio CD. Performer.
- Jasnogorska Muzyka Dawna - Musica Claromontana, Vol. 22; Vol. 23; Vol. 24. Audio CD. Conductor.
- Jasnogorska Muzyka Dawna - Musica Claromontana, Audio CD. Conductor.
- Pergolesi Adriano in Siria 3CD Decca 2016
- Porpora Germanico in Germania Decca 2018
