= Yasushi Watanabe =

Japanese anthropologist (born 1967)

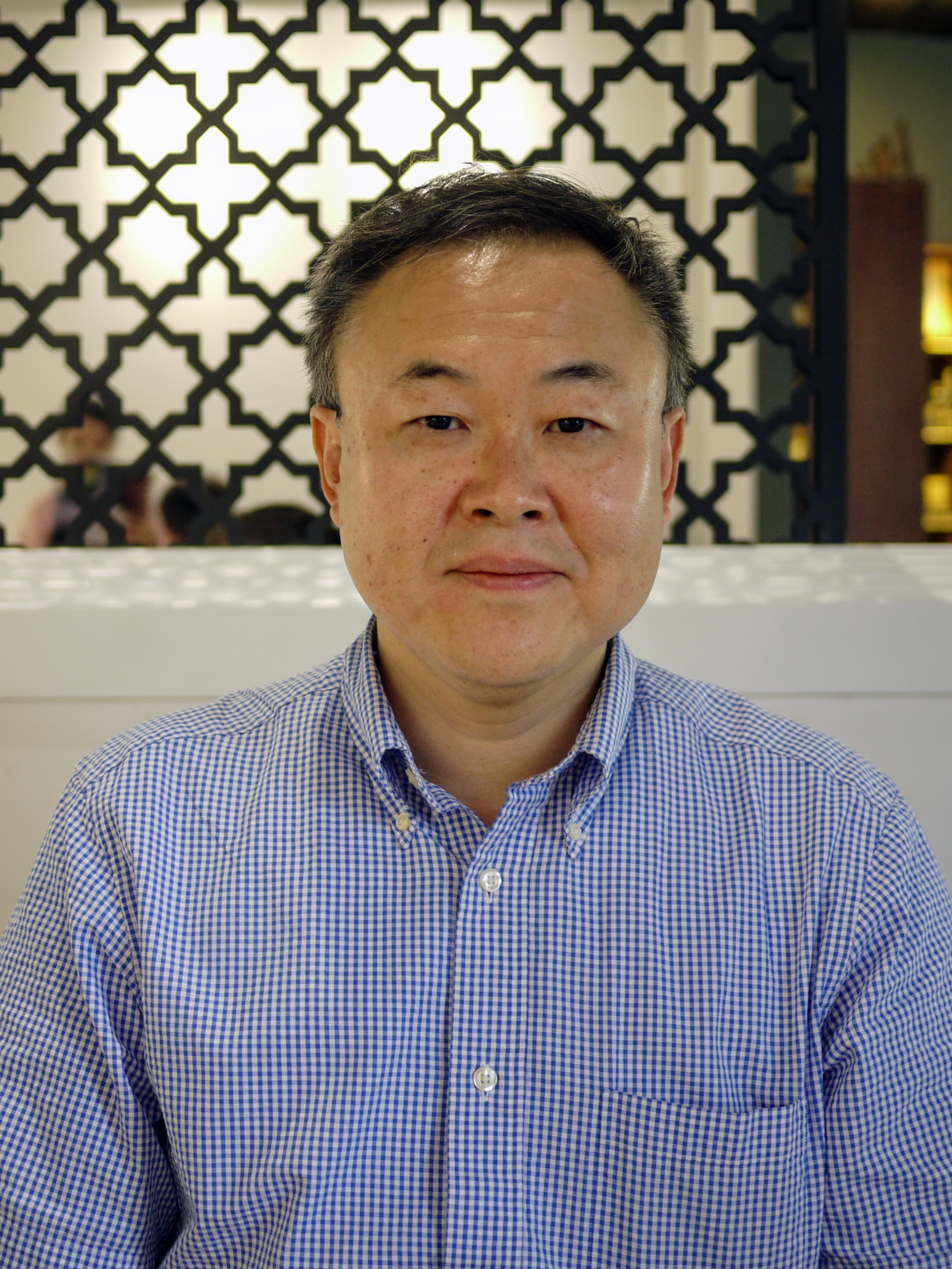
Image of Yasushi Watanabe

Yasushi Watanabe (渡辺 靖, Watanabe Yasushi) (born 1967) is a Japanese anthropologist and a full professor at Keio University. He earned a Ph.D. in Social Anthropology at Harvard University in 1997. After post-doctoral fellowships at Cambridge and Oxford Universities, he joined Keio University's Graduate School of Media and Governance as well as Faculty of Environment and Information Studies in 1999. He attained the rank of full professor in 2005, and is one of Japan's most prominent experts on soft power, public diplomacy, cultural policy and American Studies.

During the 2003–04 academic years, he was a recipient of an Abe Fellowship(Social Science Research Council and the Japan Foundation), which he held at the Weatherhead Center for International Affairs at Harvard University. He was awarded a prestigious Japan Academy Medal in 2005. He served as a Fellow at Downing College, Cambridge in 2007, a visiting professor at Institut d'Etudes Politiques de Paris (Science-Po) in 2013 and a Japan Scholar at the Wilson Center in 2018. He was a visiting scholar at the School of International Studies at Peking University in 2017 and at College of Europe in 2018. He has been selected for the International Visitor Leadership Program (IVLP) by the U.S. Department of State in 2018.

In 2025, he was selected as an International Honorary Member of the American Academy of Arts and Sciences.

He serves on the editorial boards of Anthem Studies in Soft Power and Public Diplomacy, Place Branding and Public Diplomacy and International Journal of Public Diplomacy Research.

He is a director (program chair) at the International House of Japan, a co-chair of the Japan Advisory Council of the Salzburg Global Seminar, and an adjunct senior fellow at NIRA (Nippon Institute for Research Advancement). He is a member of Harvard Club of Japan.

He has served on the executive board of the Japanese Association for American Studies, the advisory panel on the Japan Foundation, the advisory panel on public diplomacy of the Japanese Ministry of Foreign Affairs, and the advisory panel (chair) on NHK World. He has also served as an editorial member of Gaiko (Diplomacy) magazine, a book reviewer for Asahi Shimbun and Yomiuri Shimbun, among others.

== Works ==
=== In English ===
- The American Family: Across the Class Divide, University of Michigan Press & Pluto Press, 2005, Single-author.
- Soft Power Superpowers: Cultural and National Assets of Japan and the United States, Routledge, 2008, Co-editor.
- The Routledge Handbook of Soft Power, Routledge, 2016, Contributor.
- Handbook of Cultural Security, Edward Elgar Publishing, 2018, Editor.
- Handbook of Public Diplomacy, Edward Elgar Publishing, 2025, Contributor.

=== In Japanese (single-authored books) ===
- After America: Trajectories of the Bostonians and the Politics of Culture (2004)
- American Community: Between the State and the Individual (2007)
- American Center: International Cultural Strategies of the United States (2008)
- Paradox of American Democracy (2010)
- Culture and Diplomacy: The Age of Public Diplomacy (2011)
- American Dilemmas (2015)
- American Legacy: The Spread of Soft Power and Its Implications (2015)
- Rethinking "Culture": On the Concept of Cultural Security (2015)
- Libertarianism: The Quest for Freedom in the Contemporary United States (2019)
- White Nationalism: Cultural Reactionary in America (2020)
- What is America?: Contestations Over Self-Portrayals and Their View of the World (2022)
- Contemporary American Politics and Society (2024)
