= Giulio Prandi =

Italian musician

Giulio Prandi is an Italian conductor and musicologist. He specializes in baroque music and is the conductor of the Ghislieri Choir and Consort at the Ghislieri College in Pavia.

== Discography ==
- Giacomo Antonio Perti Cantate morali e spirituali Op.1, Gloria Banditelli Yetsabel Fernández Arias - Arion Consort & Choir, Giulio Prandi 2CDs. Amadeus Italy 2010
- Niccolò Jommelli Sacred Music: Emanuela Galli, Romina Basso, Francesca Boncompagni, Ghislieri. Prandi (DHM)
- Baldassare Galuppi Sacred music: Roberta Invernizzi, Romina Basso, Krystian Adam, Ghislieri. Prandi (DHM)
- Davide Perez Mattutino de' Morti: Roberta Invernizzi, Salvo Vitale, Ghislieri Choir, Ghislieri Consort, Giulio Prandi DHM
