= L'Olimpiade (Vivaldi) =

Opera by Antonio Vivaldi

- Dramma per musica by Antonio Vivaldi
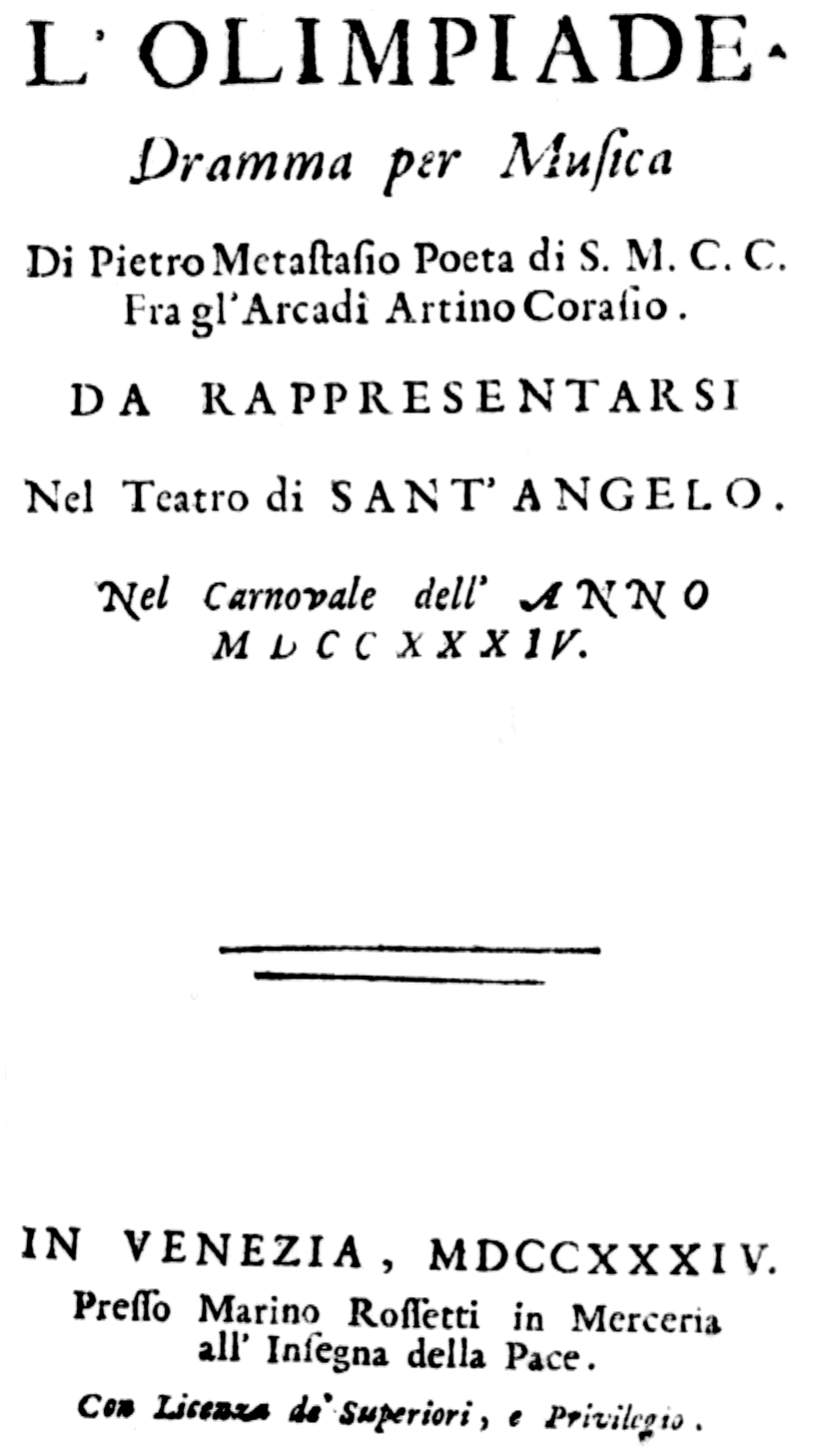
- Title page of the libretto
- Librettist: Pietro Metastasio
- Language: Italian
- Premiere: 17 February 1734; Teatro Sant'Angelo, Venice

L'Olimpiade (The Olympiad, RV 725) is a dramma per musica in three acts that was composed by Antonio Vivaldi. The opera uses an Italian libretto by Pietro Metastasio that was originally written for Antonio Caldara's 1733 opera of the same name. Vivaldi's version premiered in Venice at the Teatro Sant'Angelo on 17 February 1734. The same libretto was to be later set to music by over 50 other composers, including Giovanni Battista Pergolesi in 1735.

== Roles ==
Role	Voice type	Premiere cast 17 February 1734
Clistene, king of Sicione	tenor	Marc'Antonio Mareschi
Aristea, his daughter, in love with Megacle	contralto	Anna Cattarina della Parte
Argene, a lady from Crete disguised as a shepherdess under the name of Licori, in love with Licida	contralto	Marta Arrigoni
Megacle, in love with Aristea, friend of Licida	soprano castrato	Francesco Bilanzoni
Licida, believed to be the son of the king of Crete, in love with Aristea, friend of Megacle	contralto (travesti role)	Angela Zanucchi
Aminta	soprano castrato	Marianino Nicolini
Alcandro, friend of Clistene	bass	Massimiliano Miller

== Synopsis ==
Time
Place

=== Act 1 ===
Megacles arrives in Sicyon just in time to enter the Olympic Games under the name of Lycidas, a friend who once saved his life. Unknown to Megacles, Lycidas is in love with Aristaea, whose hand is to be offered to the winner of the games by her father, King Cleisthenes. Lycidas, once betrothed to Princess Argene of Crete, is unaware that Megacles and Aristaea already love each other, and he subsequently tells his friend of the prize. Aristaea and Megacles greet each other fondly, but Megacles now feels bound by his promise to compete as Lycidas. Meanwhile, Argene arrives in Olympia disguised as a shepherdess, to win back Lycidas.

=== Act 2 ===
Megacles wins the games, confesses the truth to Aristaea and departs, broken-hearted. When Lycidas comes to claim her, Aristaea reproaches him, as does the disguised Argene, much to his dismay. Amyntas, tutor to Lycidas, reports that Megacles has drowned himself, and King Cleisthenes, apprised of the deception, banishes Lycidas.

=== Act 3 ===
Argene prevents the desperate Aristaea from suicide, Megacles is rescued by a fisherman, and Lycidas contemplates the assassination of the king. Aristaea pleads mercy for Lycidas and Argene offers herself in his place; as proof that she is a princess, she shows Cleisthenes a chain given her by Lycidas. He recognizes it as belonging to his son, abandoned in infancy to forestall the prophecy that he would kill his father. Lycidas, reinstated, accepts Argene, leaving his sister to Megacles.

== See also ==
- L'Olimpiade, Pietro Metastasio's libretto
