= Reinhard Goebel =

German conductor and violinist

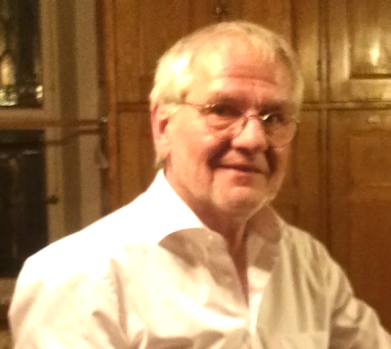
- Reinhard Goebel, 2019
- Born: July 31, 1952 (age 73); Siegen, West Germany
- Citizenship: German
- Occupations: Conductor, violinist
- Years active: 1973–present
- Employer: Mozarteum University Salzburg
- Organizations: Musica Antiqua Köln
- Style: Early music on authentic instruments
- Title: Professor for historical performance

Reinhard Goebel (German: [ˈɡøːbəl]; born 31 July 1952 in Siegen, West Germany) is a German conductor and violinist specialising in early music on authentic instruments and professor for historical performance at the Mozarteum in Salzburg. He founded the ensemble Musica Antiqua Köln in 1973. Since 2018, he has led the Berlin Baroque Soloists.

Goebel received his first violin lessons at the age of twelve. He studied the violin with Franzjosef Maier, the leader of the Collegium Aureum, Saschko Gawriloff, an expert in difficult modern scores, and baroque violinists Marie Leonhardt in The Hague and Eduard Melkus in Vienna.

In 1973, Goebel founded his early music ensemble Musica Antiqua Köln that he led until its dissolution in 2007. He has been an important figure in early music and, for example, was instrumental in rediscovering the music of composers such as Marc-Antoine Charpentier and the Dresden court composers Johann David Heinichen and Jan Dismas Zelenka.
