= Fabio Biondi =

Italian violinist and conductor

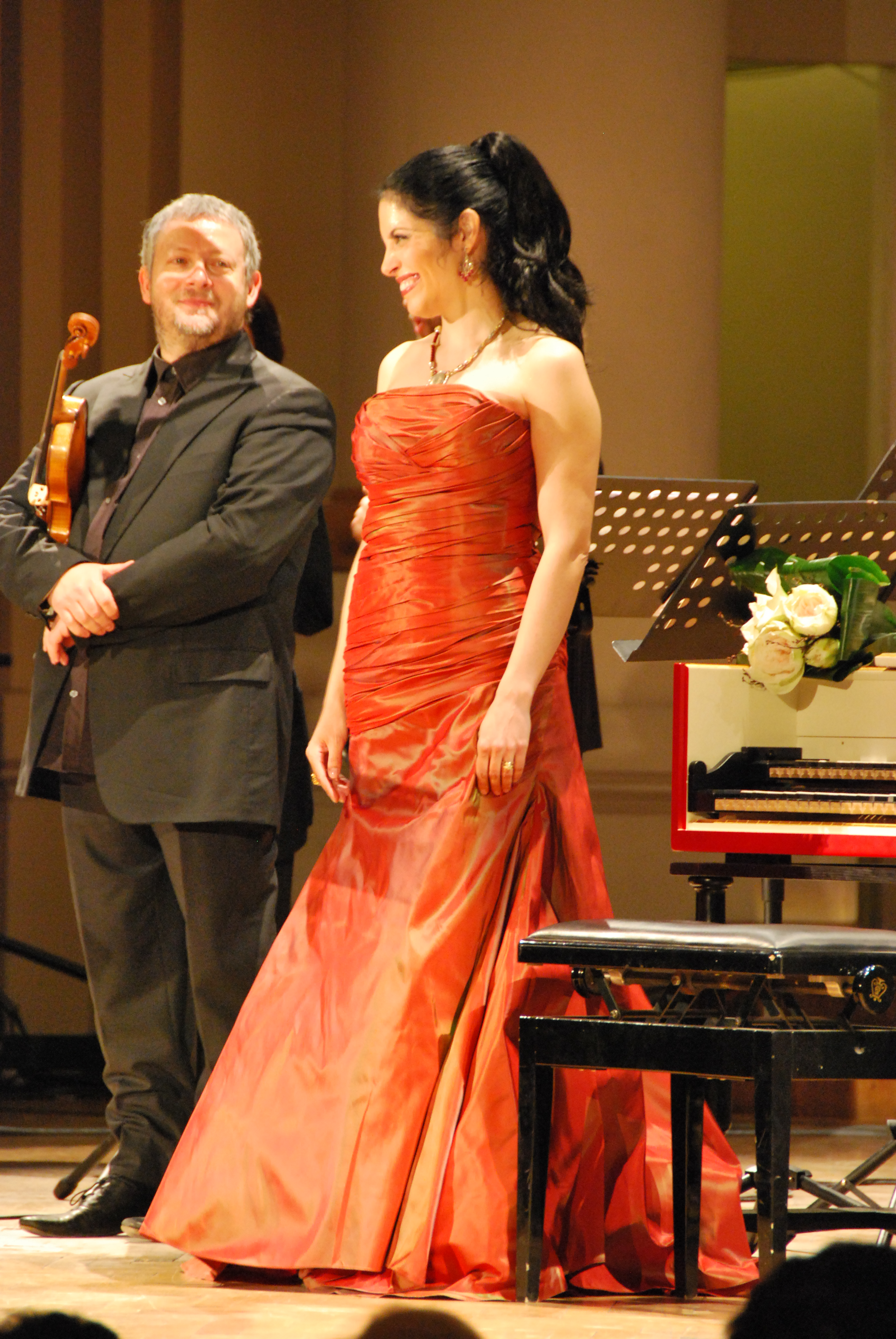
- Biondi with Vivica Genaux at the Misteria Paschalia, Poland, in 2010
- Born: 15 March 1961 (age 65); Palermo, Italy
- Occupations: Classical violinist; Conductor

Fabio Biondi (born 15 March 1961) is an Italian violinist and conductor. He is a specialist in Baroque and early music.

== Biography ==
Born in Palermo, Sicily, Biondi had a late start, having never even held a violin till age 11, but by the following year he had advanced so quickly that he played a concerto with the RAI Symphony Orchestra. When he was 16, he performed Johann Sebastian Bach's violin concertos at the Musikverein in Vienna. Since then, he has performed with a number of baroque ensembles including La Capella Reial, Musica Antiqua Wien, Seminario Musicale, La Chapelle Royale and Les Musiciens du Louvre. In 1990 Biondi founded Europa Galante, an Italian ensemble specializing in baroque music, that he directs.

Biondi's recordings include Antonio Vivaldi's Il cimento dell'armonia e dell'inventione including The Four Seasons and the opera Bajazet, Arcangelo Corelli's concerti grossi, works of Alessandro Scarlatti and George Frideric Handel, from the 18th-century Italian violin repertoire (Antonio Vivaldi, Francesco Maria Veracini, Pietro Locatelli, Giuseppe Tartini), as well as sonatas by Johann Sebastian Bach, Franz Schubert and Robert Schumann. Biondi also performs in duos with keyboard (piano, harpsichord or fortepiano).

In 2005 Biondi became artistic director for baroque music of the Stavanger Symphony Orchestra. He plays a 1766 Carlo Ferdinando Gagliano violin lent him by the Salvatore Cicero Foundation in Palermo, an Andrea Guarneri (Cremona, 1686) violin and also a Desiderio Quercetani violin for recording and play.

Biondi is married to Ana de Labra; they have one child. He also has three children with a former wife.

== Discography (in selection) ==
As soloist

- 2008: Trio Sonatas For Violin, Flute & B.C. • Trio Sonatas For Oboe, Recorder & B.C. (Complete) (Brilliant Classics), with Ensemble Tripla Concordia
- 2010: Leclair: Premier Livre De Sonates A Violon Seul Avec La Basse Continue, 1723 (Arcana Records)

With Europa Galante

- 1998: Vivaldi: L'estro armonico (12 Concertos op.3) (Virgin Classics)
- 2001: Vivaldi: Il cimento dell'armonia e dell'inventione (Virgin Classics)
- 2002: Vivaldi: Concerti per mandolini - Concerti con molti strumenti (Virgin Classics)
- 2004: Vivaldi: Mottetti, con Patrizia Ciofi e l'Europa Galante (Virgin Classics)
- 2005: Vivaldi: Concerti con molti strumenti, Vol.2 (Virgin Classics)
- 2007: Vivaldi: Concerti per viola d'amore (Virgin Classics)
- 2009: Boccherini: Trio - Quartet - Quintet - Sextet For Strings (Virgin Classics)
- 2009: Pyrotechnics: Vivaldi Arias (Virgin Classics), feat. Vivica Genaux
- 2010: Vivaldi: Ercole Sul Termodonte (Virgin Classics), directed by Fabio Biondi
- 2011: Vivaldi: La Stravaganza (Edition by John Walsh, London, 1728) (Virgin Classics)
- 2015: Vivaldi: I Concerti Dell' Addio (The Farewell Concertos) (Glossa Music), directed by Fabio Biondi
