= Europa Galante =

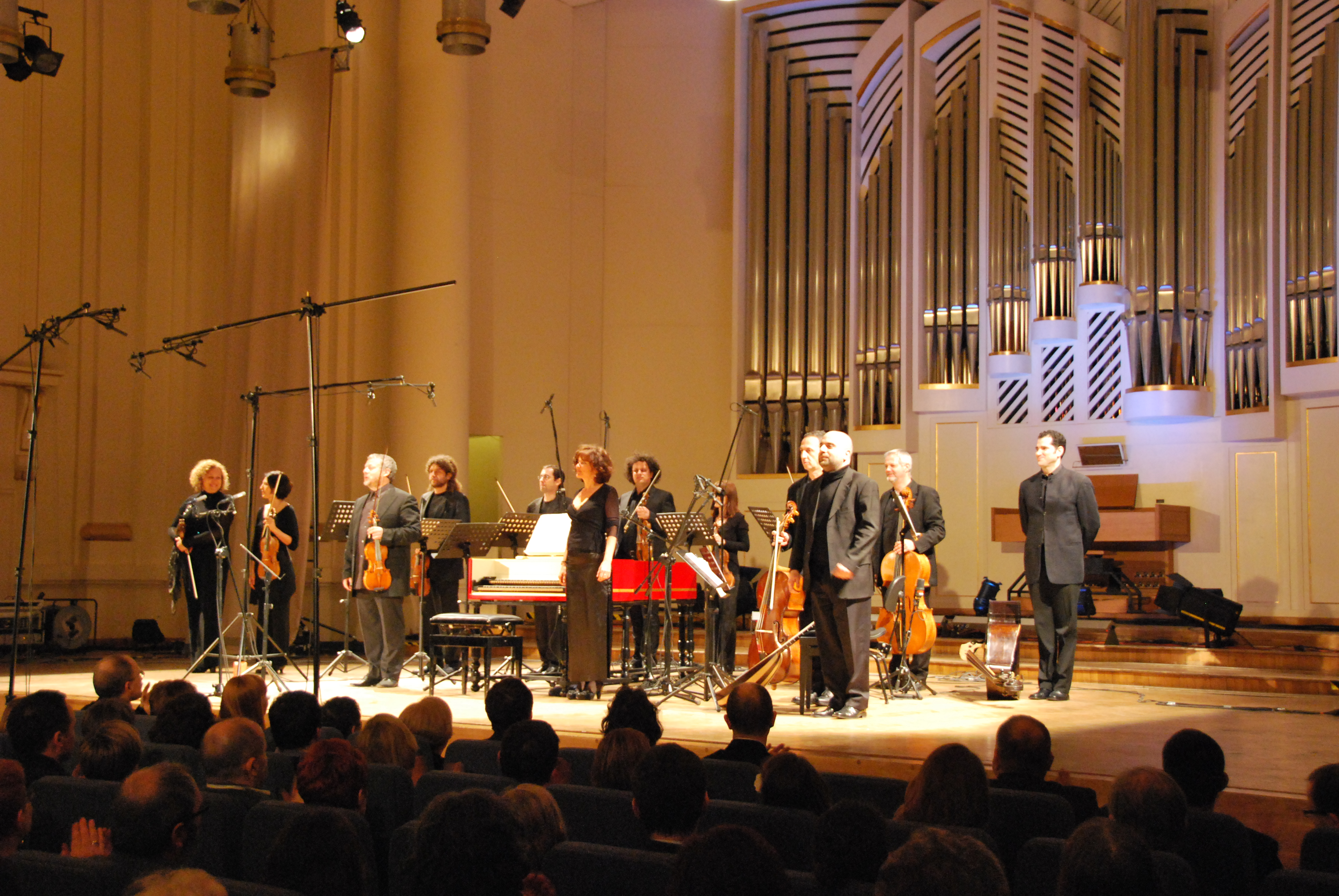
At the Kraków Philharmonic in 2010

Europa Galante is an Italian period-instrument Baroque orchestra founded by violinist Fabio Biondi in 1990 and directed by him.

The ensemble has been invited to play at festivals and in concert halls such as La Scala in Milan, the Accademia di Santa Cecilia in Rome, the Suntory Hall in Tokyo, the Concertgebouw in Amsterdam, the Royal Albert Hall in London, the Konzerthaus in Vienna, Lincoln Center in New York City, the Sydney Opera House, and the Kraków Philharmonic. They have performed with soloists such as Roberta Invernizzi, Vivica Genaux, Ian Bostridge, Sonia Prina, and Philippe Jaroussky.

== Repertoire ==
The orchestra began its career with a recording of Vivaldi's The Four Seasons. Their large repertoire includes Cavalli's operas, Caldara's oratorios, Scarlatti's oratorios and concertos, chamber music, and recently Bellini's Norma, and Donizetti's Anna Bolena.

Europa Galante first recorded for the French Opus 111 label, and after 10 years with Virgin Classics (with repertoire such as Vivaldi's La stravaganza concerto, Scarlatti's "Concerti e Sinfonie", and Boccherini's quintets as well as operas such as Vivaldi's Bajazet and Ercole su'l Termodonte. Their records have won many international awards. They were nominated for the 1997 Grammy Award for Best Small Ensemble Performance (With or Without Conductor). The ensemble also records with the Spanish Glossa label; releases have included "Il diario di Chiara" (Music from La Pietà in Venice in the 18th century) and, in 2014, Vivaldi's "Farewell Concertos" (concertos from the Conte Collalto Catalogue).
