= Artaserse =

Widely used opera libretto by Metastasio

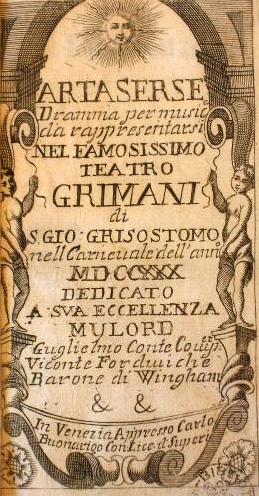
Original libretto cover for Johann Adolph Hasse's 1730 setting of Artaserse

Artaserse is the name of a number of Italian operas, all based on a text by Metastasio. Artaserse is the Italian form of the name of the king Artaxerxes I of Persia.

There are over 90 known settings of Metastasio's text. The libretto was originally written for, and first set to music by Leonardo Vinci in 1730 for Rome (Artaserse). It was subsequently set by Johann Adolph Hasse in 1730 (Artaserse) for Venice and in 1760 for Naples, by Christoph Willibald Gluck in 1741 for Milan, by Pietro Chiarini in 1741 for Verona, by Carl Heinrich Graun in 1743 for Stuttgart, by Domènec Terradellas in 1744 for Venice, by Baldassare Galuppi in 1749 for Vienna, by Johann Christian Bach in 1760 for Turin, by Josef Mysliveček in 1774 for Naples (Artaserse), by Marcos Portugal in 1806 for Lisbon and many other times. The text was often altered.

Thomas Arne's 1762 Artaxerxes is set to an English libretto that is based on Metastasio's. Mozart's aria for soprano and orchestra "Conservati fedele" (K. 23, 1765) is set to the parting verses of Mandane (Artaserse's sister) at the end of the first scene.

The opera was famously performed in 1734 as a pastiche of songs by various composers such as Johann Adolf Hasse, Attilio Ariosti, Nicola Porpora and Riccardo Broschi. It was in this that Broschi's brother, Farinelli, sang one of his best-known arias, "Son qual nave ch'agitata".

== Recordings ==
- Vinci (1730):
  - Philippe Jaroussky (Artaserse), Max Emanuel Cenčić (Mandane), Juan Sancho (Artabano), Franco Fagioli (Arbace), Valer Barna-Sabadus (Semira), Yuriy Mynenko (Megabise), Concerto Köln, Diego Fasolis, 2012. Label: Erato (DVD), Erato/Warner Classics (CD)
- Hasse (1730):
  - Anicio Zorzi Giustiniani (Artaserse), Maria Grazia Schiavo (Mandane), Sonia Prina (Artabano), Franco Fagioli (Arbace), Rosa Bove (Semira), Antonio Giovannini (Megabise), Ensemble Barocco dell'Orchestra Internazionale d'Italia, Corrado Rovaris, 2016. Label: Dynamic CDS7715
  - Andrew Goodwin (Artaserse), Vivica Genaux (Mandane), Carlo Vistoli (Artabano), David Hansen (Arbace), Emily Edmonds (Semira), Russell Harcourt (Megabise), Orchestra of the Antipodes, Erin Helyard, 2018. Label: Pinchgut Live PG011
- Arne (1762):
  - Margaret Cable (Artaxerxes), Elizabeth Vaughan (Mandane), John Brecknock (Artabanes), Sandra Browne (Arbaces), Sandra Dugdale (Semira), New Chamber Soloists, Maurits Sillem, 1979. Label: MRF Records MRF-162S
  - Christopher Robson (Artaxerxes), Catherine Bott (Mandane), Ian Partridge (Artabanes), Patricia Spence (Arbaces), Philippa Hyde (Semira), Richard Edgar-Wilson (Rimenes), The Parley of Instruments, Roy Goodman, 1996. Label: Hyperion CDA67051/2
  - Christopher Ainslie (Artaxerxes), Elizabeth Watts (Mandane), Andrew Staples (Artabanes), Caitlin Hulcup (Arbaces), Rebecca Bottone (Semira), Daniel Norman (Rimenes), The Mozartists, Ian Page, 2021. Label: Signum Records SIGCD672
