= Dilyara Idrisova =

Russian opera singer (born 1989)

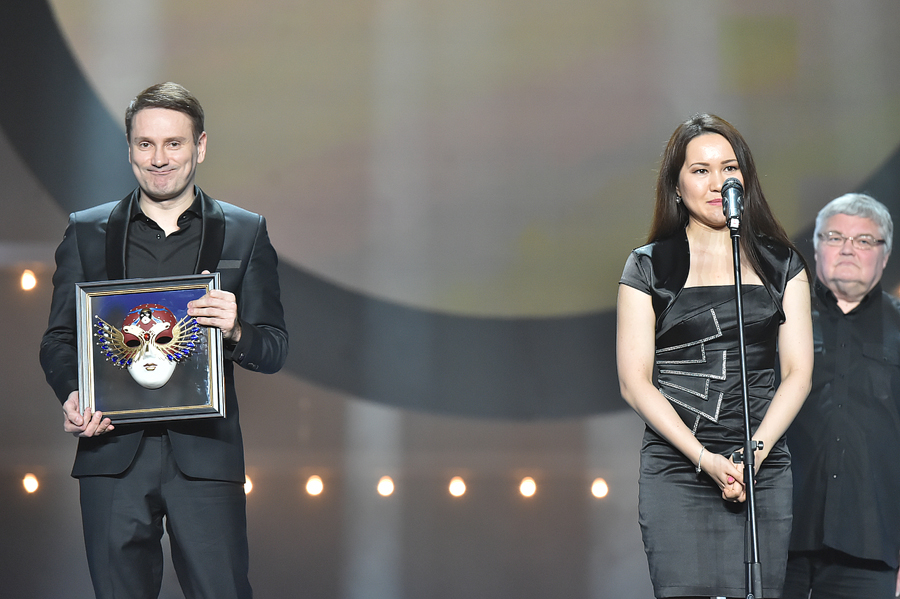
- Born: Dilyara Marsovna Idrisova; 1 February 1989 (age 37); Ufa, Soviet Union
- Occupation: Opera singer (soprano)
- Years active: 2007–present
- Website: vk.com/id13227251

Dilyara Idrisova (English: Диляра Марсовна Идрисова; born 1 February 1989) is a Russian soprano opera singer and recitalist, specialising in soprano and coloratura mezzo-soprano material of the 18th and 19th century. She studied with Milyausha Murtazina and Galina Pisarenko.

== Early life and education ==
Idrisova was born on February 1, 1989, in Ufa, Russia.

As of 2014, Idrisova has been a member of the ensemble of the Bashkir State theatre of Opera and ballet (Ufa, Russia).

== International career ==
Season 2014/2015 included debut in Handel's Alessandro production (produced by Decca/Parnassus Arts Productions), singing the role of Lisaura opposite Julia Lezhneva, Max Emanuel Cenčić, and Xavier Sabata under George Petrou conducting the Armonia Atenea. Performances took place in Moscow Tchaikovsky Concert Hall, Brussel's Palais de Bozar and at the Handel Festspiele in Bad Lauchstaedt. In summer 2015, Idrisova participated in her first professional recording – Pergolesi's Adriano in Syria (as Sabina) opposite Franco Fagioli. The CD was released in November 2016 by Decca.

=== Season 2015/2015 ===
Idrisova made a debut with a world-premiere production of J.A. Hasse's Siroe (as Arasse). Idrisova performed in Krakow, Moscow and in Amsterdam's Concertgebouw. The cast included Julia Lezhneva, Max Emanuel Cenčić and Juan Sancho. In December 2015, she performed Pergolesi's Adriano in Syria (as Sabina) at the Opéra Royal de Versailles. In March 2016, Idrisova performed soprano solo in J. S. Bach's Passions at the Gasteig Philharmonie in March 2016 and in summer 2016 she made her second recording for Decca and her first recording alongside Max Cenčić – a complete version of Porpora's Germanico in Germania (as Rosmonda). The CD was released in January 2018 and received French award Diapason d'Or. October 17, 2016, at the Auditorio National, Idrisova sang Asteria in the Handel opera Tamerlan. She excited the audience with a particularly emotional performance, a beautiful voice and a lyrical soprano.

=== Season 2016/2017 ===
Idrisova performed in Lausanne, Wiesbaden and Vienna performing Hasse's Siroe, Porpora's Germanico and Pergolesi's Adriano in Syria as well as the release of both CDs through Decca.

In Russia she was awarded the National prize Golden Mask as Opera Singer of the Year for the role of Iole in Handel's Hercules.

=== Season 2017/2018 ===
Idrisova performed the role of Idaspe in Vivaldi's Tamerlano with Thibault Noally and Les Accentus at the Konzerthaus Dortmund. Idrisova sang the role of Teofane in Handel's Ottone at the Theater an der Wien.

Idrisova has been coached by pianist and conductor Mikhail Antonenko since 2014.

== Further sources ==
- Laurent Bury (2018-02-16). "Vers une Porpora Renaissance. Germanico in Germania". forumopera.com.
- Jean Michel Pennetier (2016-12-08). "Adriano in Siria". www.forumopera.com.
- Guillaume Saintagne (2017-07-07). "Ottone au top! Ottone – Beaune". www.forumopera.com (in French).
- Bernard Schreuders (2017-03-25). "Ann Hallenberg, Agrippine jusqu'au bout des cils. Agrippina – Anvers". www.forumopera.com (in French).
