= Catone in Utica (Vinci) =

1728 opera by Leonardo Vinci

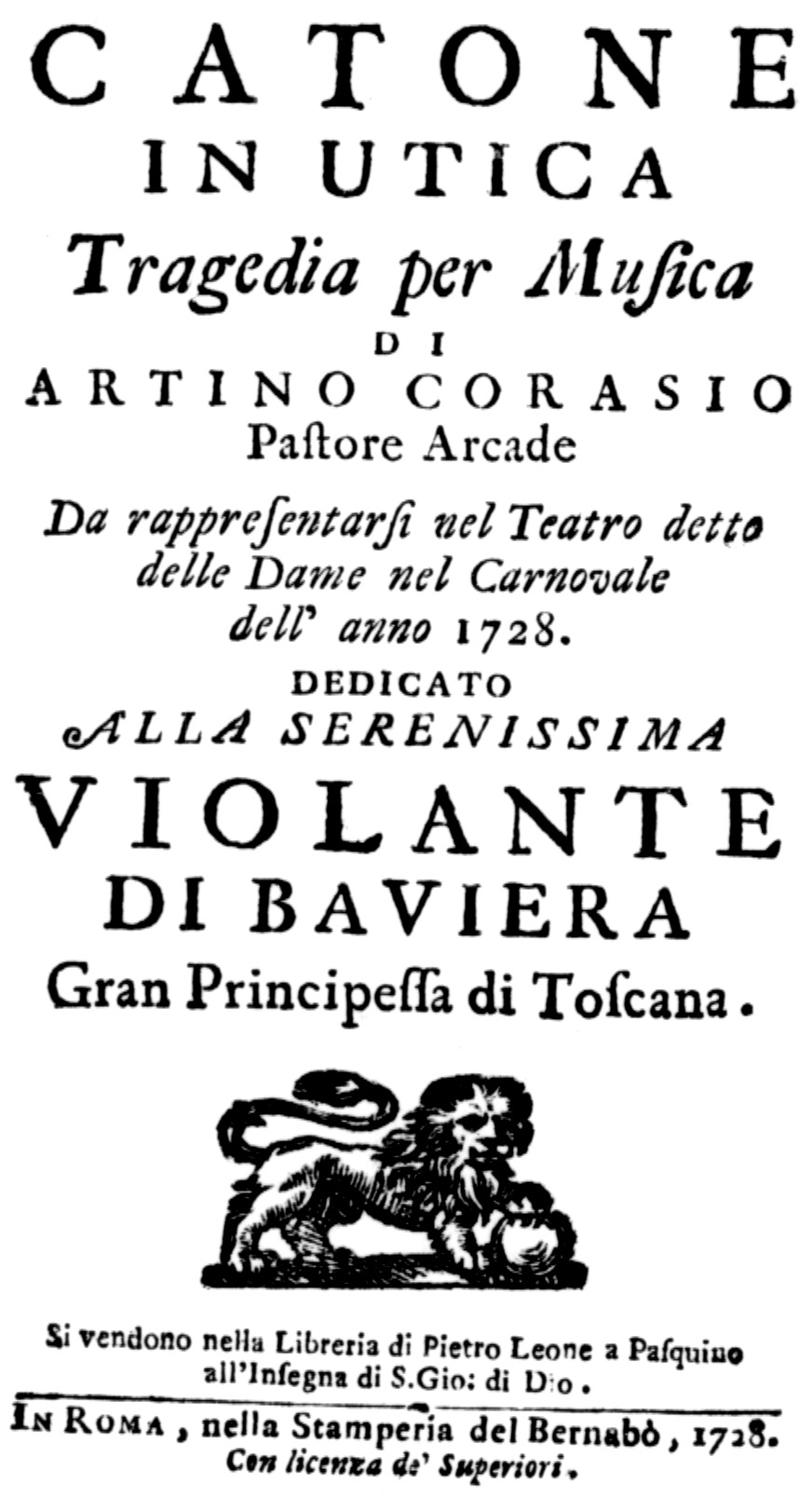
Title page of 'Catone in Utica'

Catone in Utica is a 1728 opera by Leonardo Vinci. It was the original setting of Metastasio's libretto of that name.

== Recordings ==
- Vinci, Leonardo: Catone in Utica Max Emanuel Cenčić (Arbace), Franco Fagioli (Cesare), Valer Sabadus (Marzia), Martin Mitterutzner (Fulvio), Vince Yi (Emilia), Juan Sancho (Catone); Il Pomo D'oro, Riccardo Minasi Decca 3CD 2015
