= Ezio (libretto) =

Ezio is an opera libretto by Pietro Metastasio, first officially set to music by Pietro Auletta and premièred in the Teatro delle Dame, Rome, on December 26, 1728; an unauthorized setting by Nicola Porpora had already been premièred a month earlier (November 20) in Venice.

Other notable settings include:

- Ezio (Handel), King's Theatre, London 1732
- Ezio (Mysliveček, 1775), Naples
- Ezio (Mysliveček, 1777), Munich – completely new music
- Ezio (Gluck), Prague 1750, revised Vienna 1763
- Ezio (1730), Johann Adolph Hasse, Naples, revised Dresden 1755
- Ezio (1750), Davide Perez, Teatro Regio Ducale, Milan
- Ezio (1757), Tommaso Traetta, Teatro delle Dame, Rome
- Ezio (Latilla), Naples 1758
