= Xavier Sabata =

Spanish operatic countertenor (born 1976)

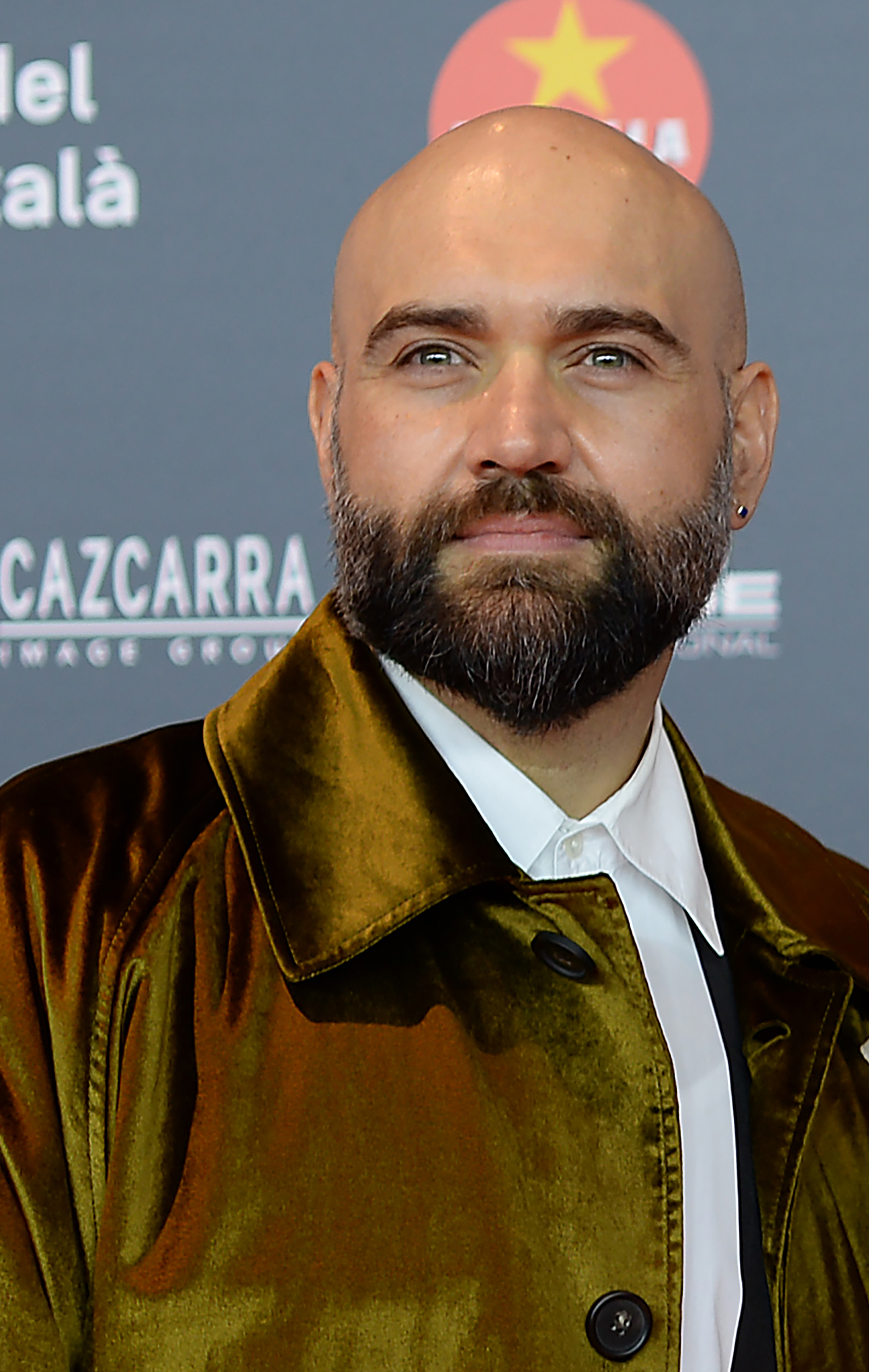
Xavier Sabata

Xavier Sabata Corominas (born 1976 in Avià, Catalonia) is a Spanish operatic countertenor.

== Discography ==
- I Dilettanti - cantatas and arias by Emanuele d'Astorga, Giacomo Maccari, Benedetto Marcello, Giovanni Maria Ruggieri. Latinitas nostra, Markellos Chryssikos, Aparté - AP093
- Handel: Bad Guys - Il Pomo d'Oro, Riccardo Minasi, Aparté - AP048
- The 5 Countertenors - singing Porpora: Tu, spietato, non farai cader vittima (from Ifigenia in Aulide) and Handel: Voi che udite il mio lamento (from Agrippina), with Yuriy Minenko, Max Emanuel Cencic, Valer Barna-Sabadus, Vince Yi, Armonia Atenea, George Petrou, Decca - 4788094
- Amore X Amore, Viaggio in Italia, Handel cantatas - Xavier Sabata, Forma Antiqua, Winter and Winter - 9101622
- Le Jardin des Voix - Les Arts Florissants, William Christie
- Cavalli: Miracolo D’amore - Love Airs and Duets by Francesco Cavalli. Raquel Andueza (soprano) & Xavier Sabata (countertenor), La Galanía. Anima E Corpo - AEC006 2016
- Catharsis - arias by Ariosti, Caldara, Conti, Handel, Hasse, Orlandini, Sarro, Pietro Torri, Vivaldi. Armonia Atenea, George Petrou, Aparté - AP143 2017
- Furioso

Xavier Sabata, Le Concert de l'Hostel Dieu, Franck-Emmanuel Comte, Aparté - 2026

Selected opera recordings

- Handel: Arminio - Xavier Sabata (as Tullio), George Petrou, Decca - 4788764
- Vivaldi: L'Oracolo in Messenia - Xavier Sabata (as Alessandro), Europa Galante, Fabio Biondi, Erato - 6025472
- Cavalli: La Didone - Xavier Sabata (as Larba), Les Arts Florissants, William Christie & Clément Hervieu-Léger (director), Recorded live at the Théâtre de Caen, October 2011 Opus Arte - OABD7106D
- Stefano Landi: Il Sant'Alessio - Xavier Sabata. Orchestra and Chorus of Les Arts Florissants, William Christie, Erato - 5189999
- Handel: Faramondo - Xavier Sabata (Gernando), Choeur de la Radio Suisse, Lugano & I Barocchisti, Diego Fasolis, Erato - 2166112
- Cesti: Orontea - Xavier Sabata (Alidoro), Frankfurter Opern- und Museumsorchester, Ivor Bolton Oehms - OC965
- Handel: Tamerlano - Xavier Sabata (Tamerlano), Minasi Naive - V5373
- Handel: Alessandro - Xavier Sabata (Tassile), Armonia Atenea, George Petrou, Decca - 4784699
- Handel: Ottone - Xavier Sabata (Adalberto), Max Emanuel Cenčić, Lauren Snouffer, Pavel Kudinov, Decca - 4831814
