= Mark Milhofer =

English operatic tenor

- Born: England
- Education: Guildhall School of Music and Drama
- Occupation: Operatic tenor
- Organizations: Royal Opera House
- Website: markmilhofer.com

Mark Milhofer is an English operatic tenor, who has performed at major international opera houses, beginning his career in Italy. Besides the standard repertoire, the singer has appeared in historically informed performances such as Monterverdi's L'incoronazione di Poppea, in 20th-century operas by Benjamin Britten and Gian Carlo Menotti, and in premieres of new operas.

== Career ==
Born in England, Milhofer studied voice as a choral scholar at Magdalen College, Oxford. He studied further at the Guildhall School of Music in London. He appeared as Giannetto in Rossini's La gazza ladra with the British Youth Opera, and was then invited to study with Renata Scotto and Leyla Gencer in Italy. He made his international debut at the Teatro Regio in Parma in Rossini's La Cenerentola. He appeared in Il matrimonio segreto, Donizetti's Don Pasquale, Rossini's La scala di seta and Il Turco in Italia, Puccini's La Rondine. He performed in 20th-century operas such as Britten's Billy Budd, The Turn of the Screw and as the Madwoman in his Curlew River, and as the Magician in Menotti's The Consul. He took part in the world premieres of Marcello Panni's The Banquet, Marco Tutino's Federico II and Alessandro Solbiati's Leggenda.

Milhofer appeared in leading roles at opera houses in Europe, such as Belmonte in Mozart's Die Entführung aus dem Serail at the Landestheater Salzburg and in Rennes, Ramiro in La Cenerentola in Bern, Almaviva in Rossini's Der Barbier von Sevilla at the Graz Opera. He performed the role of Ferrando in Giorgio Strehler's staging of Mozart's Così fan tutte in Beijing and Moscow.

In 2017, he appeared in a production of Monteverdi's L’incoronazione di Poppea for the reopening of the Staatsoper Unter den Linden in Berlin, staged by Eva Höckmayr and conducted by Diego Fasolis. He was Arnalta, Poppea's nurse, alongside Anna Prohaska as Poppea and Max Emanuel Cencic as Nerone. A critic called his performance the surprise of the evening, and noted his unity of voice and character in comic and tragic action, dressed as a parody of the butler Riff Raff in The Rocky Horror Picture Show.

In concert, Milhofer sang Britten's Serenade for Tenor, Horn and Strings in Rome and Parma, Orff's Carmina Burana at the Staatstheater am Gärtnerplatz, in Zagreb, Monte-Carlo and Rome, Rossini's Petite messe solennelle at the Aldeburgh Festival, and Handel's Judas Maccabeus at The Proms with The King's Consort.
