= Artaserse (Vinci) =

Baroque opera

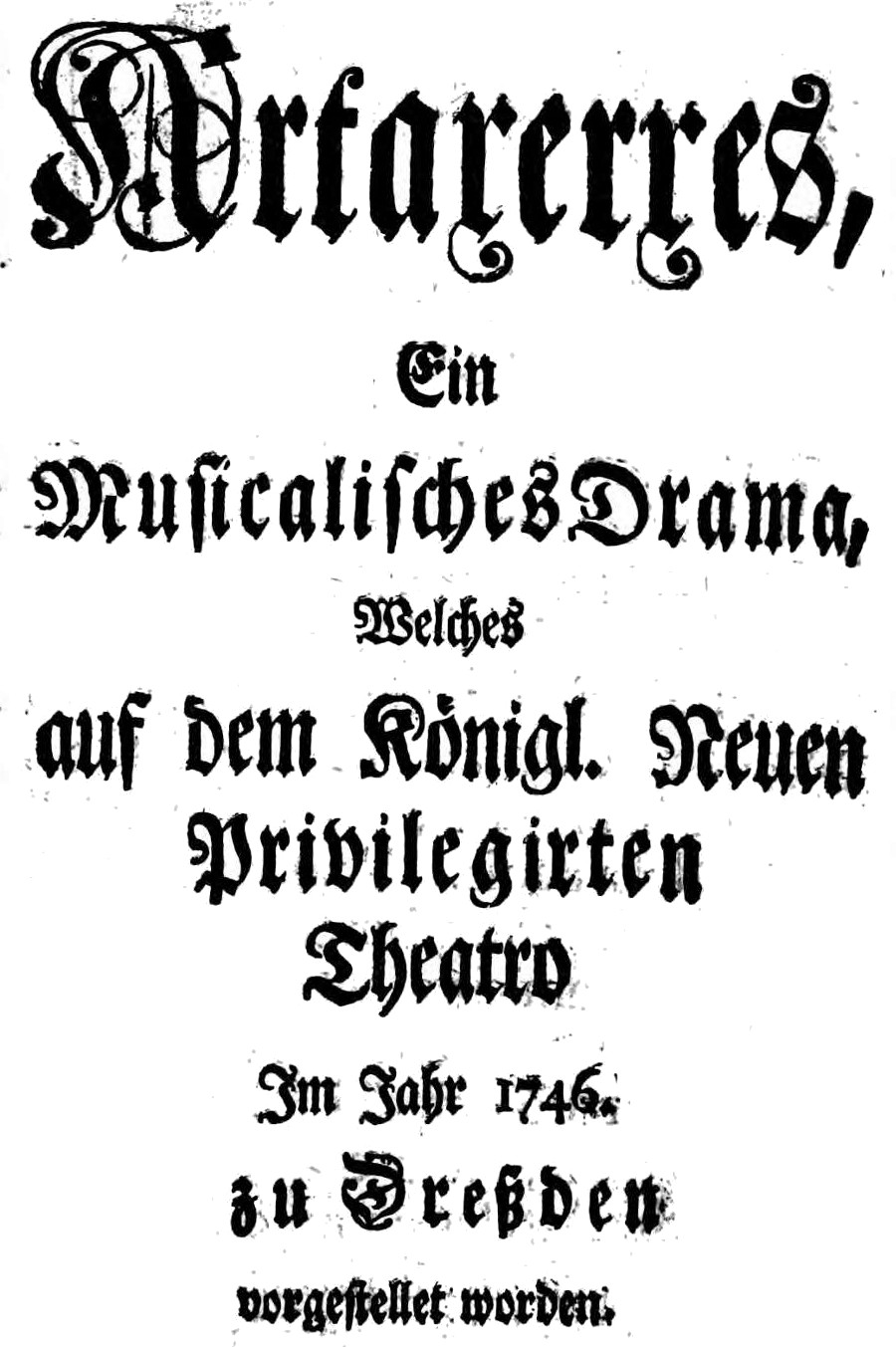
Leonardo Vinci - Artaserse - German titlepage of the libretto - Dresden 1746

Artaserse is an opera (dramma per musica) in three acts composed by Leonardo Vinci to an Italian libretto by Pietro Metastasio. This was the first of many musical settings of Metastasio's libretto Artaserse. Vinci and Metastasio were known to have collaborated closely for the world premiere of the opera in Rome. This was the last opera Vinci composed before his death, and also considered to be his masterpiece. It is known among Baroque opera enthusiasts for its florid vocal lines and taxing tessituras. It premiered during the carnival season on 4 February 1730 at the Teatro delle Dame in Rome. As women were banned from the opera stage in Rome in the 18th century, all the female roles in the original production were taken up by castrati. However, subsequent 18th-century productions outside Rome included women in the cast.

Artaserse continued to be popular for a while after Vinci's death, but has since faded into obscurity. The first modern revival of Artaserse was staged at the Opéra national de Lorraine in Nancy on 2 November 2012, featuring Philippe Jaroussky as Artaserse, Max Emanuel Cenčić as Mandane, Juan Sancho as Artabano, Franco Fagioli as Arbace, Valer Barna-Sabadus as Semira and Yuriy Mynenko as Megabise. In honour of the single-sex casting at the original premiere, the revival was staged with an all-male cast, with countertenors cast in skirt roles to play the female characters in the opera.

== Roles ==
Roles, voice types, premier cast
Role	Voice type	Premiere cast, 4 February 1730
Artaserse Prince and subsequently King of Persia; friend of Arbace and in love with Semira	soprano castrato	Raffaele Signorini
Mandane Sister of Artaserse; in love with Arbace	soprano castrato (en travesti)	Giacinto Fontana ("Farfallino")
Artabano Prefect of the Royal Guard; father of Arbace and Semira	tenor	Francesco Tolve
Arbace Brother of Semira; Friend of Artaserse; in love with Mandane	soprano castrato	Giovanni Carestini ("Cusanino")
Semira Sister of Arbace; in love with Artaserse	soprano castrato (en travesti)	Giuseppe Appiani
Megabise General of the Persian Army and confidant of Artabano; also in love with Semira	alto castrato	Giovanni Ossi

== Synopsis ==
Eighteenth-century Italian operas in serious style are almost always set in a distant or legendary past and are built around historical, pseudo-historical, or mythological characters. The main character of Metastasio's Artaserse is based on the life of king Artaxerxes I of Persia, a ruler of the fifth century B.C., son of Xerxes I. As women were banned from singing on stage in Rome (part of the Papal States) at that time, all the female roles were played by castrati. As was typical of Baroque Italian operas of the 18th century, the heroic roles of Arbace and Artaserse were played by castrati. The lone tenor plays the main villain Artabano, as typical of Baroque Italian operas, where the broken male voice is usually assigned to villains and servants.

=== Overture ===
As is typical of Italian operas of that time, Artaserse opens with an Italian overture or sinfonia in three (fast-slow-fast) movements (in this case allegro, grave and minuetto).

=== Act 1 ===
The opera opens in a moonlit garden of the palace of Serse (Xerxes). Mandane, the daughter of King Serse, and Arbace, the son of the King's general Artabano, are in love. Serse has opposed their marriage and banished Arbace from the palace. Arbace climbs the wall into the garden. The two young lovers express their love for each other, as well as their pain for not being able to be together despite their love. Arbace and Mandane say goodbye as Mandane heads back into the palace, and Mandane asks Arbace not to forget her. (Aria: Conservati fedele).

As Mandane heads back into the palace, Artabano arrives carrying a bloody sword. His fury at Serse's treatment of his son and his desire for Arbace to become King have led him to assassinate Serse. Artabano confesses the murder to Arbace and exchanges his bloody sword for that of Arbace. However, Arbace is not happy about the turn of events due to his love for Mandane and his friendship with the king's son, Artaserse, as well as the sheer cruelty of the act. (Aria: Fra cento affanni e cento). Arbace leaves and Artabano says that eliminating the whole royal family was the only way for Arbace to become king. Artaserse, the King's younger son, arrives with his guards. Artabano tells him of his father's death and accuses Artaserse's older brother Dario of the murder, "Who but he at dead of night could penetrate the palace? Who approach the royal bed? Nay, more, his royal ambition..." Artaserse commands Artabano to avenge his father's death by killing Dario. Artaserse expresses apprehension at having to kill his own brother, but Artabano declares that a son who murders his father is no son. (Aria: Su le sponde del torbido Lete).

Megabise enters and Artaserse confides his sadness and anger at the recent events to Megabise. Megabise consoles Artaserse and says that killing Dario was necessary as a form of self-defense. Semira, Arbace's sister, enters as Artaserse prepares to leave. Semira asks Artaserse not to leave but he proceeds to do so anyway, but not before declaring his love for Semira. (Aria: Per pietà, bell'idol mio). Semira knows that something is wrong and asks Megabise, who tells her that Serse was murdered in his sleep and Dario is the one responsible. Semira expresses her shock, but Megabise is indifferent, declaring that it does not matter who is on the throne. Megabise is also in love with Semira and declares his love for her, but Semira is already in love with Artaserse and is unable to reciprocate Megabise's feelings. Megabise declares that he will fight to win Semira's love. (Aria: Sogna il guerrier le schiere). Semira expresses her pain at separation from Artaserse due to the recent events. (Aria: Bramar di perdere)

In the King's palace, Mandane and Artaserse express their pain at having to put their brother Dario to death. Artabano enters and announces the execution of Dario. Mandane expresses her grief, while Artaserse expresses his guilt at having to resort to this, though Artabano says that it is a just punishment for murdering his father. Semira enters and declares that Dario was not the murderer, as the murderer had escaped through the garden with blood still fresh on his sword. Given the evidence, Mandane thinks that Arbace must be the murderer. Artaserse and Mandane also realise that they had just put an innocent man to death. Artaserse demands that Arbace be brought before him. Megabise enters and declares that Arbace is the murderer. Arbace is brought into the palace in chains by the palace guards, and he declares his innocence. Artaserse asks Arbace to prove his innocence, but Arbace is unable to do so, and can only offer his word as evidence. Mandane questions Arbace with the evidence, and also points out Arbace's unhappiness with Serse, and Arbace does not deny the evidence, but continues to maintain his innocence to the very end. Presented with overwhelming evidence before him, Artaserse has no choice but to declare Arbace guilty. Arbace asks Artabano to defend him, but he acts indifferent to Arbace's plight. Artaserse declares the case solved but does so painfully as he leaves. (Aria: Deh respirar lasciatemi). Arbace asks for Artabano to take pity on him, but Artabano declares that a son who is a traitor is no son of his. (Aria: Non ti son padre). Arbace then turns to Semira, but Semira says that she will support him if he can prove his innocence, but as he is currently seen to be guilty, she cannot let her feelings get in the way. (Aria: Torna innocente e poi).

External videos
- "Vo solcando un mar crudele", Arbace's aria on YouTube

Arbace turns to Megabise next, but he too is indifferent to Arbace's plight and leaves. Finally, Arbace turns to Mandane and asks her to believe in his innocence, but Mandane refuses to do so and angrily declares Arbace her enemy before she leaves. (Aria: Dimmi che un empio sei). Arbace laments his fate, but is unable to speak up due to his love for his father. (Aria: Vo solcando un mar crudele).

=== Act 2 ===
Artaserse and Artabano are talking about the recent events, and Artabano says that Arbace deserves to die for his crime. However, Artaserse is reluctant to kill his friend, and envies Artabano for his mental strength to condemn his own son without question. Artaserse asks Artabano to find a way to save Arbace, but Artabano says that Arbace's silence is proof of his guilt. Nevertheless, Artaserse says that Arbace has proclaimed his innocence and refuses to believe that his friend is guilty, instead believing that there must be some other reason for his silence. (Aria: Rendimi il caro amico). After Artaserse leaves, Arbace is brought in by a guard. Artabano asks the guard to leave the two of them alone. Artabano plans to sneak Arbace out, but Arbace refuses. Artabano reveals his plans to kill the whole royal family and make Arbace king. Arbace is horrified at his father's treachery, and angrily refuses to follow him. (Aria: Mi scacci sdegnato!). Arbace is led away by the guard, and Artabano sighs, saying that despite all that he cannot condemn the son he loves. Megabise enters and notices Artabano's hesitation. Megabise says that time is short and they have to act quickly if he is to secure the throne for Arbace. Together, Artabano and Megabise discuss the plans to kill Artaserse. Artabano promises Semira's hand in marriage to Megabise if he cooperates, which Megabise is very pleased to hear. Semira enters, and Artabano forces her to marry Megabise against her will. (Aria: Amalo e se al tuo sguardo). Semira asks Megabise to spare her from the marriage if he truly loves her, but Megabise refuses. Semira declares that Megabise can have her body, but can never win her heart. Nevertheless, Megabise is content to marry Semira, even if it means that she will hate him for it. (Aria: Non temer ch'io mai ti dica). Semira is devastated at the turn of events. Mandane enters and talks to Semira. It pains both of them greatly to think of Arbace as a traitor, and Semira notes that Mandane will have to abandon her feelings for him. However, it still pains Mandane greatly to think that the man she loved would turn out to be so cruel. (Aria: Se d'un amor tiranno). Semira also feels greatly conflicted, and is confused about whom to side with in this crisis. (Aria: Se del fiume altera l'onda).

Meanwhile, in the Great Hall of the Royal Council, Artaserse is hesitant about taking the throne as he is afraid that his inexperience will let everyone down. Megabise enters and informs Artaserse that Mandane and Semira wish to speak to him. Megabise then escorts the women in. Semira pleads with Artaserse to have mercy on Arbace, but Mandane insists that vengeance must be served. Artaserse is unsure of what to do as making a decision means having to choose between his sister and his lover. Artabano enters, and Artaserse asks Artabano to console him. Artabano says that Arbace deserves to be punished, but Artaserse is conflicted, and worried about Semira wrongly accusing him of cruelty. Artaserse appoints Artabano to be the judge at Arbace's trial. However, Mandane doubts that Artabano will actually carry out the punishment against his son. Arbace is then escorted in by guards to stand trial. Arbace is horrified to see his father as the judge. Once again, Arbace chooses to remain silent, but continues to maintain his innocence. Artabano thus declares Arbace guilty, to the horror of Artaserse. Arbace is sad that his father would condemn him so in front of his very eyes. (Aria: Per quel paterno amplesso). Mandane is horrified to see Artabano condemning his own son to death, and accuses Artabano of being heartless. (Aria: Va' tra le selve ircane). Semira is also horrified to see her brother sentenced to death, but Artaserse maintains that he had left Arbace's life in Artabano's hands, and thus was not the one who sentenced Arbace to death. Nevertheless, Semira accuses Artaserse of being a tyrant. (Aria: Per quell'affetto). Artaserse and Artabano lament the accusations that Semira and Mandane respectively have made against them. Artabano says that he is the most miserable, and Artaserse says that though Artabano's grief is great, so is his own. (Aria: Non conosco in tal momento). After everyone has left, Artabano, now alone, says that he almost lost himself in the feeling of being appointed Arbace's judge, but hopes that Arbace will not think that he saved himself at the cost of his own son. (Aria: Così stupisce e cade).

=== Act 3 ===
In the prison, Arbace continues to lament his cruel fate. (Arioso: Perché tarda è mai la morte). Artaserse, who has been doubting the guilt of Arbace, his long-time friend, all this while enters the prison to secretly release Arbace. Arbace is grateful for Artaserse's belief in him, and wishes Artaserse all the best before he leaves. (Aria: L'onda dal mar divisa). Artaserse believes that he is doing the right thing by releasing Arbace, and continues to believe in Arbace's innocence. (Aria: Nuvoletta opposta al sole).

Artabano arrives at the prison with Megabise and the other conspirators to look for Arbace. However, Arbace had already escaped and was nowhere to be found. Artabano thinks that Arbace has already been executed, and Megabise promises to help Artabano get his revenge as he poisons the sacred cup. (Aria: Ardito ti renda). Meanwhile, Artabano is devastated at the apparent death of his son, and swears to have his revenge by killing Artaserse. (Aria: Figlio se più non vivi).

Meanwhile, Mandane is conflicted by her feelings for Arbace. Semira enters and brings news of Arbace's apparent execution. Semira blames Mandane for being heartless, but Mandane too is devastated by the news of Arbace's death, and accuses Semira of not understanding her pain. (Aria: Mi credi spietata?). Semira realises that insulting Mandane has not made her feel any better. (Aria: Non è ver che sia contento). Meanwhile, Arbace sneaks into the palace to look for Mandane. Mandane is happy to see that Arbace is still alive, but at the same time cannot bring herself to forgive Arbace for killing her father. (Duet: Tu vuoi ch'io viva o cara).

At the venue of Artaserse's coronation, Artabano hands Artaserse the poisoned sacred cup. Artaserse, surrounded by his nobles, swears to maintain the rights, laws, and customs of his subjects and is about to pledge this by drinking from the sacred cup, unaware that Artabano has poisoned the drink. Semira enters the temple, still unhappy about Artaserse's decision to execute Arbace. Mandane arrives and brings news that Megabise and his fellow rebels had reached the palace entrance, but Arbace was alive and had already killed the traitor, thus saving Artaserse. This act confirms Arbace's innocence to Artaserse, and Artaserse gets Arbace to swear his innocence by drinking from the sacred cup. Artabano is now faced with seeing his son die or confessing the truth. He confesses to all that he has poisoned the cup, intending to kill Artaserse and that he had also assassinated Serse. Artabano then draws his sword and is about to kill Artaserse, but Arbace grabs the poisoned sacred cup and threatens to commit suicide by drinking from it if Artabano goes ahead. Artabano throws his sword away and is detained by the guards. Artaserse initially wants to execute Artabano for treason but Arbace pleads for mercy on Artabano's behalf. Artaserse, out of his love for Semira and his gratitude to Arbace, agrees to spare Artabano's life and condemn him to eternal exile instead. With Arbace's innocence proven beyond doubt, and both pairs of lovers reunited, the entire cast (including the dead Megabise) gathers on stage for the final chorus, as they celebrate the reign of a merciful and righteous king. (Chorus: Giusto re, la Persia adora).

== Orchestration ==
Artaserse is scored for 2 trumpets, 2 horns, 2 oboes, first and second violins, violas, timpani and basso continuo.

== Structure of libretto ==
Act	Scene	Style and title	Characters
Act 1	Scene 1	Recitativo: Addio. Sentimi Arbace	Arbace, Mandane
Act 1	Scene 1	Aria: Conservati fedele	Mandane
Act 1	Scene 2	Recitativo: Figlio, Arbace. Signor	Artabano, Arbace
Act 1	Scene 2	Aria: Fra cento affani	Arbace
Act 1	Scene 3	Recitativo: Coraggio o miei pensieri	Artabano, Artaserse
Act 1	Scene 3	Aria: Su le sponde del torbido Lete	Artabano
Act 1	Scene 4	Recitativo: Qual vittima si Svena!	Artaserse, Megabise
Act 1	Scene 5	Recitativo: Dove, principe, dove?	Semira, Artaserse
Act 1	Scene 5	Aria: Per pietà, bell'idol mio	Artaserse
Act 1	Scene 6	Recitativo: Gran Cose Io Temo	Semira, Megabise
Act 1	Scene 6	Aria: Sogna il guerrier le schiere	Megabise
Act 1	Scene 7	Recitativo: Voi della Persia	Semira
Act 1	Scene 7	Aria: Bramar di perdere troppo affetto	Semira
Act 1	Scene 8	Recitativo: Ah Mandane ... Artaserse	Artaserse, Mandane
Act 1	Scene 9	Recitativo: Signor. Amico	Artabano, Artaserse, Mandane
Act 1	Scene 10	Recitativo: Artaserse, Respira	Semira, Artaserse, Mandane, Artabano
Act 1	Scene 11	Recitativo: Arbace è il reo	Megabise, Artaserse, Semira, Arbace, Artabano
Act 1	Scene 11	Aria: Deh respirar lasciatemi	Artaserse
Act 1	Scene 12	Recitativo: E Innocente dovrai tanti oltraggi soffrir	Arbace, Megabise, Semira, Mandane, Artabano
Act 1	Scene 12	Aria: Non ti son padre	Artabano
Act 1	Scene 13	Recitativo: Ma per qual fallo mai	Artabace
Act 1	Scene 13	Aria: Torna innocente e poi	Semira
Act 1	Scene 14	Recitativo: Mio ben mia vita …	Arbace, Mandane
Act 1	Scene 14	Aria: Dimmi che un empio sei	Mandane
Act 1	Scene 15	Recitativo accompagnato: No che non ha la sorte	Arbace
Act 1	Scene 15	Aria: Vo solcando un mar crudele	Arbace
Act 2	Scene 1	Recitativo: Dal carcere o custodi	Artaserse, Artabano
Act 2	Scene 1	Aria: Rendimi Il caro amico	Artaserse
Act 2	Scene 2	Recitativo: Son quasi in porto	Artabano, Arbace
Act 2	Scene 2	Aria: Mi scacci sdegnato!	Arbace
Act 2	Scene 3	Recitativo: I tuoi deboli affetti	Artabano, Megabise
Act 2	Scene 4	Recitativo: Figlia, è questi il tuo sposo	Artabano, Semira
Act 2	Scene 4	Aria: Amalo e se al tuo aguardo	Artabano
Act 2	Scene 5	Recitativo: Ascolta o Megabise	Semira, Megabise
Act 2	Scene 5	Aria: Non temer ch'lo mai ti dica	Megabise
Act 2	Scene 6	Recitativo: Qual serie di sventure	Semira, Mandane
Act 2	Scene 6	Aria: Se d’un amor tiranno	Mandane
Act 2	Scene 7	Recitativo: A qual di tanti mali	Semira
Act 2	Scene 7	Aria: Se del riume altera l'onda	Semira
Act 2	Scene 8	Recitativo: Mio re, chiedono a gara	Megabise, Artaserse
Act 2	Scene 9	Recitativo: Artaserse pietà	Semira, Mandane, Artaserse
Act 2	Scene 10	Recitativo: È vano la tua, la mia pierà	Artabano, Artaserse, Semira, Mandane
Act 2	Scene 11	Recitativo: Tanto odio alla Persia	Artabano, Artaserse, Artabano, Mandane
Act 2	Scene 11	Aria: Per quel paterno amplesso	Arbace
Act 2	Scene 12	Recitativo: A prezzo del mio sangue	Artabano, Mandane
Act 2	Scene 12	Aria: Va' tra le selve ircane	Mandane
Act 2	Scene 13	Recitativo: Quanto, amata Semira	Artaserse, Semira
Act 2	Scene 13	Aria: Per quell'affetto	Semira
Act 2	Scene 14	Recitativo: Dell'ingrata Semira	Artaserse, Artabano
Act 2	Scene 14	Aria: Non conosco in tal momento	Artaserse
Act 2	Scene 15	Recitativo: Son pur solo una volta	Artabano
Act 2	Scene 15	Aria: Così stupisce e cade	Artabano
Act 3	Scene 1	Arioso: Perché tarda è mai la morte	Arbace
Act 3	Scene 1	Recitativo: Arbace. Oh dei, che miro!	Artaserse, Arbace
Act 3	Scene 1	Aria: L'onda dal mar divisa	Arbace
Act 3	Scene 2	Recitativo: Quella fronte sicura e quel sembiante	Artaserse
Act 3	Scene 2	Aria: Nuvoletta opposta al sole	Artaserse
Act 3	Scene 3	Recitativo: Figlio, Arbace, ove sei?	Artabano, Megabise
Act 3	Scene 3	Aria: Ardito ti renda	Megabise
Act 3	Scene 4	Recitativo: Trovaste, avversi dei	Artabano
Act 3	Scene 4	Aria: Figlio se più non vivi	Artabano
Act 3	Scene 5	Recitativo: Alfin portai consolarti Mandane	Semira, Mandane
Act 3	Scene 5	Aria: Mi credi spietata?	Mandane
Act 3	Scene 6	Recitativo: Forsennata, che feci!	Semira
Act 3	Scene 6	Aria: Non è ver che sia contento	Semira
Act 3	Scene 7	Recitativo: Né pur qui la ritrovo	Arbace, Mandane
Act 3	Scene 7	Duetto: Tu vuoi ch’io viva o cara	Arbace, Mandane
Act 3	Scene 8	Recitativ: A voi popoli io m'offro	Artaserse, Artabano
Act 3	Scene 8	Recitativo accompagnato: Lucido dio per cui l'april fiorisce	Artaserse
Act 3	Scene 9	Accompagnato: Al riparo signor	Semira, Artaserse, Artabano
Act 3	Scene 10	Recitativo: Ferma o germano	Mandane, Artaserse
Act 3	Scene 11	Recitativo: Ecco Arbace, o monarca, a' piedi tuoi	Arbace, Artaserse, Mandane, Artabano
Act 3	Scene 11	Recitativo accompagnato: Lucido dio per cui l'april fiorisce	Arbace, Artabano
Act 3	Scene 11	Recitativo: Ferma; è veleno	Artabano, Artaserse, Arbace, Mandane, Semira
Act 3	Scene 11	Chorus: Giusto re, la Persia adora	Tutti

== Recordings ==
- Virgin Classics CD and digital: Philippe Jaroussky (countertenor) as Artaserse, Max Emanuel Cenčić (countertenor) as Mandane, Daniel Behle (tenor) as Artabano, Franco Fagioli (countertenor) as Arbace, Valer Barna-Sabadus (countertenor) as Semira, Yuriy Mynenko (countertenor) as Megabise, Concerto Köln, conductor: Diego Fasolis. (Recording date: September 2011, release: 2012.)
- ERATO DVD 46323234: Philippe Jaroussky (Artaserse), Max Emanuel Cenčić (Mandane), Franco Fagioli (Arbace), Valer Barna-Sabadus (Semira), Yuriy Mynenko (Megabise), Juan Sancho (Artabano), Concerto Köln & Coro della Radiotelevisione Svizzera, Diego Fasolis (conductor). (Filmed at l'Opera national de Lorraine 10 November 2012.)

== See also ==
- Artaserse, about Metastasio's libretto
- Artaserse, 1730 opera by Johann Adolph Hasse to an Italian libretto adapted from Metastasio
- Artaxerxes, 1762 opera by Thomas Arne, using an English translation of Metastasio's libretto
- Artaserse, 1774 opera by Josef Mysliveček
- "Conservati fedele", a 1765 concert aria by Wolfgang Amadeus Mozart using the text of the opera's first aria
