= Ezio (Gluck) =

Opera by Christoph Willibald Gluck

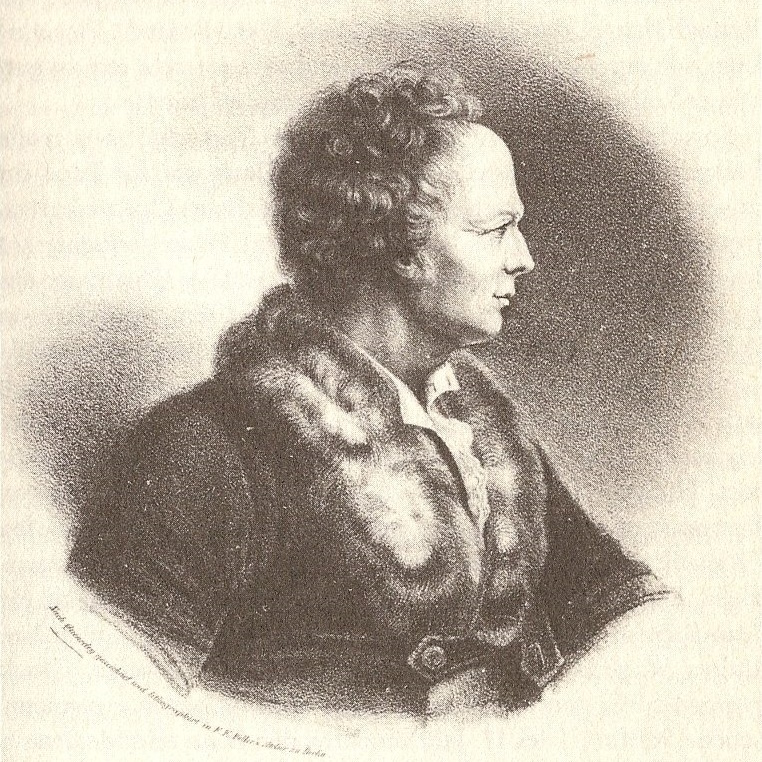
Portrait of Christoph Willibald Gluck, ca. 1750

Ezio is an opera seria from the Early Classical Period in three acts composed by Christoph Willibald Gluck, staged in 1750 and revised in 1763.

== History ==
Metastasio's libretto for this opera had previously been set by a number of composers, including Nicola Porpora (1728) and Pietro Auletta (1728), Hasse (Naples, 1730; Dresden, 1755), Handel (London, 1732) and Latilla (Naples, 1758).

Ezio was first performed during Carnival in Prague (1750); Gluck revised his setting for Vienna (1763). Unlike the two completely different settings of the text by Mysliveček, Naples (1775) and Munich (1777), Gluck's two versions share about half their music.

== Roles ==
- Ezio, general (alto castrato), who loves Fulvia
- Valentiniano, emperor (soprano castrato), who loves Fulvia
- Massimo, Roman patrician (tenor), conspiring against Valentiniano
- Fulvia, Massimo's daughter (soprano), who loves Ezio
- Onoria, sister of Valentiniano, who loves Ezio
- Varo, prefect and confidant of Ezio

== Synopsis ==
Time: 453 AD as the Christian general Aetius has just defeated Attila the Hun.
Ancient Rome

After many plot turns, at the end Ezio saves the emperor from the plot of Massimo, who is arrested but spared. In gratitude Valentiniano allows Fulvia and Ezio to marry.

== The Prague Ezio 1750 ==
The original Ezio, a full-blown opera seria with no trace of the Gluck "reform" to come, was premiered at impresario Giovanni Battista Locatelli's theatre on v Kotcích Street (German "Kotzentheater", Czech "Divadlo v Kotcích") and ran for two seasons.

== The Vienna Ezio 1763 ==
Gluck, as Handel and Vivaldi before him and all composers of his time, naturally recycled the "numbers" (arias and choruses) from older operas, rewriting the connecting recitative as necessary. In 1763 he reused nearly half of the 25 musical numbers from the Prague Ezio of 13 years earlier, avoiding material like "Se povero il ruscello" from the Prague Ezio which he had already used at the Vienna Burgtheater the previous year in the Vienna Orfeo as "Che puro ciel," and Gluck filled up the rest with 7 arias from Il trionfo di Clelia, which was also unknown to Viennese audiences. Recycling the arias from the Prague Ezio and Il trionfo di Clelia still required Gluck to transpose and adjust for the new singers, and reorchestrate for a bigger orchestra. Gluck also trimmed the opera by shortening the overture and cutting repeats. Ezio was sung by Gaetano Guadagni, Valentiniano by Giovanni Toschi, Massimo by Giuseppe Tibaldi, and Fulvia by Rosa Tibaldi.

== Recordings ==
- Prague version 1750: Jana Levicová (Ezio) Eva Müllerová (Fulvia), Martin Šrejma (Massimo), Michaela Šrůmová (Valentiniano), Ondřej Socha (Varo), Yukiko Šrejmová (Kinjo), Prague Symphony Orchestra Chamber Players dir. Jiří Petrdlík, ArcoDiva Classics 2010
- Prague version 1750: Sonia Prina (Ezio), Max Emanuel Cenčić (Valentiniano), Topi Lehtipuu (Massimo), Ann Hallenberg (Fulvia), Julian Pregardien (Varo), Mayuko Karasava (Onorio), Il Complesso Barocco, Alan Curtis. Virgin Classics 2010
- Prague version 1750: Matthias Rexroth countertenor (Ezio), Mariselle Martinez (Fulvia), Max Emanuel Cencic (Valentiniano), Netta Or (Onoria), Mirko Roschkowski (Massimo), Andréas Post (Varo), Neue Düsseldorfer Hofmusik, dir. Andreas Stoehr, Coviello Classics 2009
- Vienna version 1763: Franco Fagioli countertenor (Ezio), Ruth Sandhoff (Valentiniano), Kirsten Blaise (Fulvia), Sophie Marin-Dregor (Onoria), Stefano Ferrari (Massimo), Netta Or (Varo), Orchester der Ludwigsburger Schlossfestspiele, dir Michael Hofstetter. Oehms Classics. 2007

== Current location ==
The manuscript is now located at the Lobkowicz Palace in Prague, Czech Republic, where it can be viewed in the Beethoven Room.
