= Didone abbandonata (Hasse) =

Opera by Johann Adolph Hasse

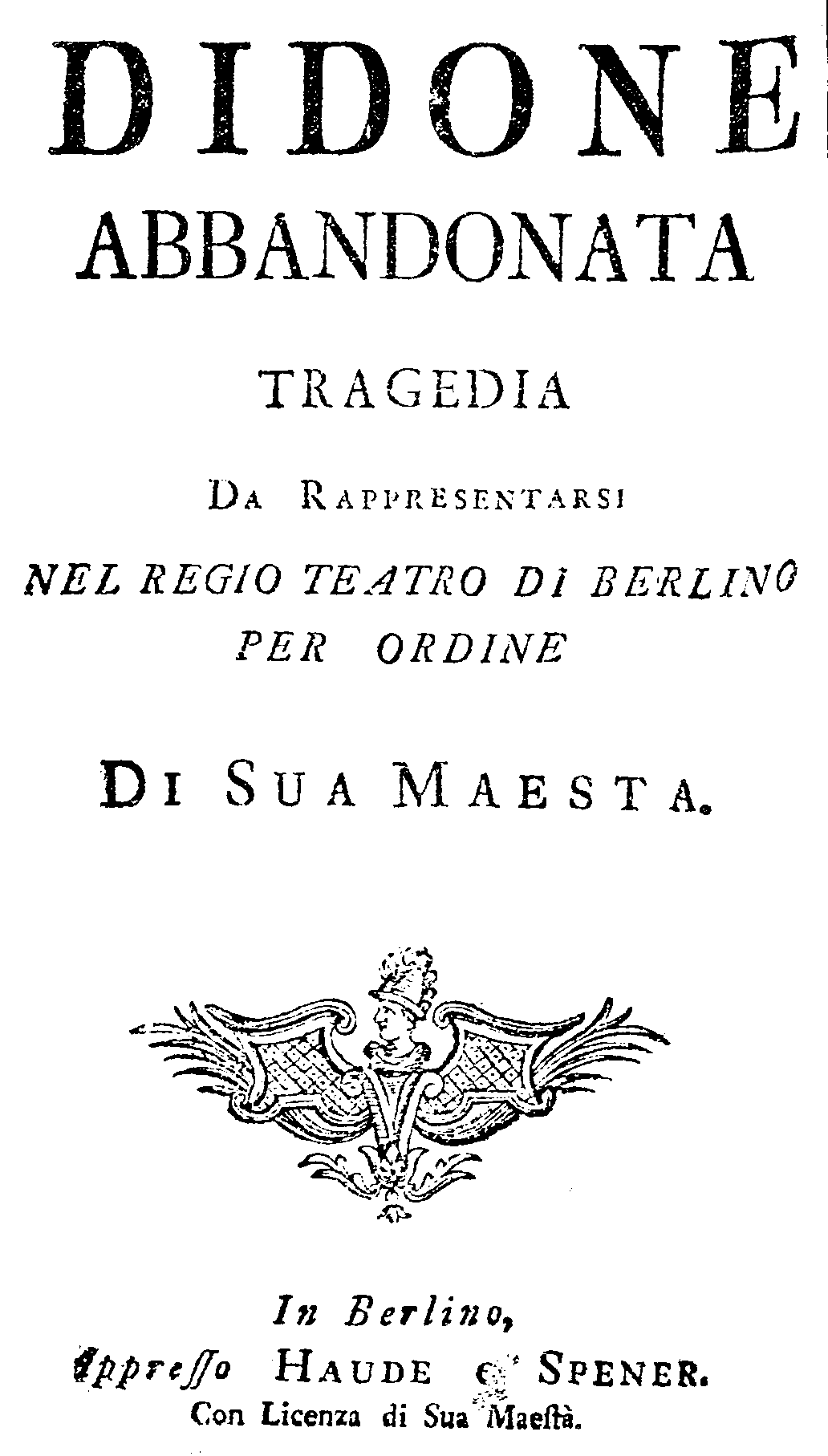
Title page of Didone abbandonata.

Didone abbandonata is a 1742 opera by Johann Adolph Hasse setting the libretto Didone abbandonata by Metastasio. It was first performed at Hubertusburg palace, near Dresden.

== Recording ==
- Theresa Holzhauser (Didone), Flavio Ferri-Benedetti (Enea), Valer Barna-Sabadus (Iarba), Magdalena Hinterdobler (Selene), Maria Celeng (Araspe) & Andreas Burkhart (Osmida), Hofkapelle München, Michael Hofstetter, 3CD Naxos 2013
