= Artaserse (Mysliveček) =

Opera by Josef Mysliveček

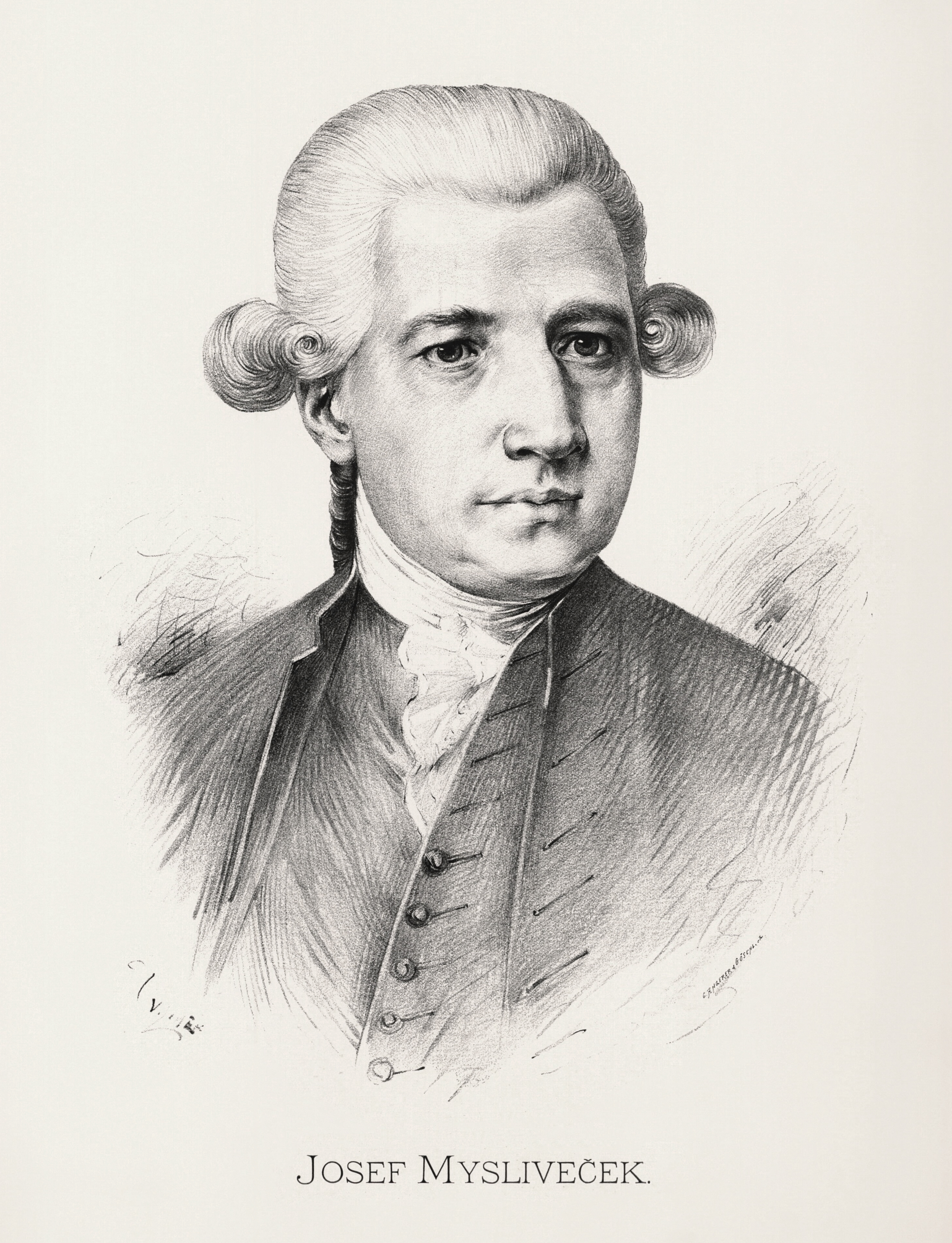
Josef Mysliveček

Artaserse is an opera in three acts by the Czech composer Josef Mysliveček, set to a popular libretto (or dramma per musica) by Metastasio that was originally performed in 1730 with music by Leonardo Vinci (one of the most popular of the Metastasio librettos). It was customary to alter the Metastasian text considerably for operas in the 1770s, but this one mainly adheres to the original Metastasian text, albeit with the placement of some scenes re-arranged and some scenes omitted. All of Mysliveček's operas are of the serious type in Italian referred to as opera seria.

== Performance history ==
The opera was first performed at the Teatro San Carlo in Naples on 13 August 1774, the birthday of queen Maria Carolina of Naples. Mysliveček received the commission on the strength of his opera Romolo ed Ersilia, which was performed on the queen's birthday the year before. Artaserse was also successful and helped the composer secure commissions for the operas Demofoonte and Ezio at the court of Naples the next year.

== Roles ==
| Cast | Voice type | Premiere, 13 August 1774, Teatro San Carlo, Naples |
|---|---|---|
| Artaserse, prince, and then king of Persia, friend of Arbace, and lover of Semira | soprano castrato | Giuseppe Pugnetti |
| Mandane, sister of Artaserse and lover of Arbace | soprano | Antonia Bernasconi |
| Artabano, prefect of the royal guards, father of Arbace and Semira | tenor | Giuseppe Tibaldi |
| Arbace, friend of Artaserse and lover of Mandane | soprano castrato | Ferdinando Tenducci |
| Semira, sister of Arbace and lover of Artaserse | soprano | Elisabetta Fiorentini |
| Megabise, general of the army and friend of Artaserse | alto | Celidea Squillace (in a breeches role) |

== Synopsis ==
Eighteenth-century Italian operas in serious style are almost always set in a distant or legendary past and are built around historical, pseudo-historical, or mythological characters. The main character of Metastasio's Artaserse is based on the life of king Artaxerxes I of Persia, a ruler of the fifth century B.C., son of Xerxes I.

The opera opens in a moonlit garden of the palace of Serse (Xerxes). Mandane, the daughter of King Serse, and Arbace, the son of the King's general Artabano, are in love. Serse has opposed their marriage and banished Arbace from the palace. Arbace climbs the wall into the garden. As the young lovers express their love for each other and their despair at Arbace's banishment, Artabano arrives carrying a bloody sword. His fury at Serse's treatment of his son and his desire for Arbace to become King have led him to assassinate Serse. Artabano confesses the murder to Arbace and exchanges his bloody sword for that of Arbace.

Artaserse, the King's younger son, arrives with his guards. Artabano tells him of his father's death and accuses Artaserse's older brother Dario of the murder, "Who but he at dead of night could penetrate the palace? Who approach the royal bed? Nay, more, his royal ambition..." Artaserse commands Artabano to avenge his father's death by killing Dario. Later in the garden, Artaxerxes expresses his love to Semira, the daughter of Artabano and sister of Arbace.

In the King's palace, the execution of Dario is announced. However, Megabise (also in love with Semira) has Arbace led into the chamber in chains, announcing that the bloody sword used to kill Serse had been found in his possession. Arbace is now condemned to death. However, Artaserse, who had long been a friend of Arbace, doubts his guilt. He releases Arbace from prison and allows him to escape through a secret passage. Megabise, encouraged by Artabano, then goes off to lead a rebellion against Artaserse.

In the Temple of the Sun Artaserse, surrounded by his nobles, swears to maintain the rights, laws, and customs of his subjects and is about to pledge this by drinking from a sacred cup, unaware that Artabano has poisoned the drink. Before Artaserse can drink from the cup, news arrives that Megabise and his men are at the palace gates. The danger is averted when Arbace kills the traitor, confirming to Artaserse that his friend is innocent. Artaserse then offers the sacred cup to Arbace instead so that he may pledge his innocence.

Artabano is now faced with seeing his son die or confessing the truth. He confesses to all that he has poisoned the cup, intending to kill Artaserse and that he had also assassinated Serse. Artabano is led off in chains. Artaserse, out of his love for Semira and his gratitude to Arbace, condemns their father to eternal exile rather than death. The opera ends with the two pairs of lovers reunited and the jubilation of all.

== Vocal set pieces ==
Act I, scene 1 - Aria of Mandane, "Conservati fedele"
Act I, scene 2 - Aria of Arbace, "Fra cento affanni"
Act I, scene 3 - Aria of Artabano, "Su le sponde del torbido Lete"
Act I, scene 5 - Aria of Artaserse, "Non mi dir ch'io sono ingrato"
Act I, scene 6 - Aria of Semira, "Bramar di perdere"
Act I, scene 10 - Quartet of Mandane, Arbace, Artaserse, and Artabano, "Deh, respirar lasciatemi"

Act II, scene 1 - Aria of Artaserse, "Rendimi il caro amico"
Act II, scene 4 - Aria of Megabise, "Non temer ch'io mai ti dica"
Act II, scene 5 - Aria of Mandane, "Pace e calma in questo sedno" [a non-Metastasian text]
Act II, scene 6 - Aria of Semira, "Se del fiume altera l'onda"
Act II, scene 9 - Accompanied recitative for Artabano, Mandane, and Arbace, "Io gelo"
Act II, scene 9 - Aria of Arbace, "Per quel paterno amplesso"
Act II, scene 10 - Aria of Mandane, "Va tra le selve ircane"
Act II, scene 11 - Aria of Artabano, "Così supisce e cade"
Act II, scene 12 - Accompanied recitative for Mandane and Arbace, "Sentimi, Arbace"
Act II, scene 12 - Duet for Mandane and Arbace, "Tu vuoi ch'io viva, o cara"

Act III, scene 2 - Aria of Artabano, "Figlio, se più non vivi"
Act III, scene 3 - Aria of Mandane, "Mi credi spietata?"
Act III, scene 7 - Accompanied recitative for Arbace, "S'io meritai"
Act III, scene 7 - Aria of Arbace, "Cara, o Dio, nel volto espresso" [a non-Metastasian text]
Act III, scene 7 - Chorus, "Giusto re, la Persia adora la clemenza assisa in trono"

== Score ==
The complete score of Artaserse is available for study online on the Italian website Internet Culturale in the form of a reproduction of a manuscript once in the possession of the Teatro San Carlo of Naples.
