= Max Emanuel Cenčić =

Austrian opera singer (born 1976)

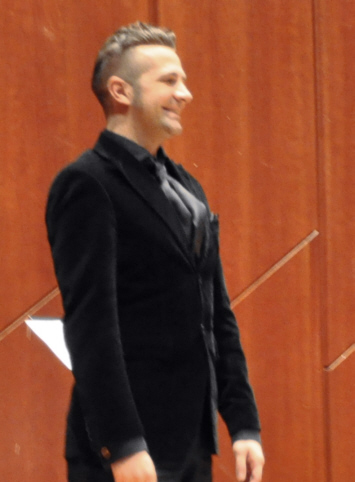
- Born: Max Emanuel Cenčić; 21 September 1976 (age 50); Zagreb, Yugoslavia
- Occupation: Countertenor
- Website: www.cencic.com

Max Emanuel Cenčić (born 21 September 1976) is a Croatian countertenor and stage director. He was a member of the Vienna Boys' Choir.

== Life and career ==
=== Early years ===
Max Emanuel Cenčić was born in Zagreb. He started singing at a very early age, earning fame in his native Croatia at the age of six after singing the Queen of the Night's coloratura aria "Der Hölle Rache" from Mozart's Die Zauberflöte on Zagreb television. From circa 1987 to 1992, Cenčić was a member of the Wiener Sängerknaben, touring and recording with them. Recorded performances, in which Cenčić was either treble soloist of the Sängerknaben or an independent male soprano, include Handel's Messiah, Haydn's Die Schöpfung, and Mozart's Requiem, alongside countertenor Derek Lee Ragin). Cenčić can also be heard as the leading treble soloist with the Wiener Sängerknaben in numerous recordings of liturgical and secular music on the Philips label. A particular highlight from his recordings with the Sängerknaben is a performance of the vocal version of Johann Strauss II's Frühlingsstimmen, a remarkable feat of vocalism for a boy soprano. Cenčić was educated at Downside School in Somerset between the ages of 14 and 16.

=== Career as male soprano ===
From 1992 to 1997, he pursued a solo career, singing soprano although his voice had already broken. Following considerable success as a male soprano (including widely acclaimed performances as Amore in Gluck's Orfeo ed Euridice), he took a sabbatical from performance, during which he re-trained his voice as a high countertenor. He made his debut as a countertenor in 2001. Prior to adapting his vocal technique to the countertenor range, Cenčić made a series of recordings of operatic arias and Lieder for a private record label. These recordings have been sporadically available through Arcadia, the online shop of the Wiener Staatsoper.

=== Career as countertenor ===
Following his re-training as a countertenor, Cenčić has enjoyed a successful career that has taken him around the world. He is noted for a series of dramatically varied portrayals, including the female role of Saint Alexis' wife (Sposa) in Stefano Landi's 1631 opera Il Sant'Alessio, with William Christie and Les Arts Florissants. Cenčić also appeared in the role of Perseo in the serenata Andromeda Liberata, attributed to Antonio Vivaldi but of dubious authorship, both in a world tour and a recording on the DGG Archiv label with Andrea Marcon and the Venice Baroque Orchestra.

Cencic made his debut at the Vienna State Opera on 28 February 2010, in the role of the Herold in the premiere of Aribert Reimann's opera Medea. He sang three additional performances of the role at the Staatsoper in November and December 2010.

A studio recording of operatic arias by George Frideric Handel, notably containing music composed for the mezzo-soprano castrato Giovanni Carestini, was released on the EMI/Virgin label in the UK on 1 March 2010. In 2015 Decca released a recording by Parnassus Arts Productions of Leonardo Vinci's Catone in Utica co-produced by Cenčić, in which he sang the role of Arbace.

Cencic appeared as Nerone in Monteverdi's L'incoronazione di Poppea for the Opéra de Lille in 2012, with Sonya Yoncheva as Poppea, Tim Mead as Ottone and Emanuelle Haïm conducting Le Concert d’Astrée. In 2017, he performed the same role in the production for the reopening of the Staatsoper Unter den Linden in Berlin, staged by Eva Höckmayr, conducted by Diego Fasolis, alongside Anna Prohaska as Poppea. He has also staged operas, notably Handel's Arminio, in which he also played the title role, at the Badisches Staatstheater Karlsruhe in 2016

== Discography ==
Albums

- Porpora: Opera Arias. Armonia Atenea, George Petrou, Decca, 2018
- Porpora: Germanico in Germania Julia Lezhneva, Capella Cracoviensis, Jan Tomasz Adamus, Decca, 2018
- Handel; Ottone Max Emanuel Cencic, Pavel Kudinov, Lauren Snouffer, Ann Hallenberg, Anna Starushkevych, Il Pomo d'Oro, George Petrou, Decca, 2017
- Handel: Arminio, Max Emanuel Cencic, Layla Claire, Ruxandra Donose, Vince Yi, Juan Sancho, Xavier Sabata, Petros Magoulas, Armonia Atenea, George Petrou, Decca, 2017
- Arie Napoletane, Il Pomo D'Oro, Maxim Emelyanychev, Decca, 2015
- Leonardo Vinci: Catone in Utica, Decca, 2015
- The 5 Countertenors, Max Emanuel Cencic, Yuriy Mynenko, Xavier Sabata, Vince Yi, Valer Barna-Sabadus, Armonia Atenea, George Petrou, Decca, 2015
- Gluck: Orfeo ed Euridice (1762), Max Emanuel Cencic, Malin Hartelius, Franco Fagioli, Emmanuelle de Negri, Insula Orchestra, Laurence Equilbey, Archiv, 2015
- Hasse: Siroe, Julia Lezhneva, Mary-Ellen Nesi, Franco Faglioli, Armonia Atenea, George Petrou, Decca, 2014
- Handel: Tamerlano, Xavier Sabata, Max Emanuel Cencic, John Mark Ainsley, Karina Gauvin, Ruxandra Donose, Il Pomo d'Oro, Riccardo Minasi, Naive Classique, 2014
- Rokoko, arias, Armonia Atenea, George Petrou, Decca, 2014
- Venezia, Il Pomo d'oro, Riccardo Minasi Virgin, 2013
- Vinci: Artaserse, Philippe Jaroussky, Max Emanuel Cencic, Valer Barna-Sabadus, Franco Fagioli, Concerto Köln, Diego Fasolis, Virgin, 2012
- Handel: Alessandro, Karina Gauvin, Julia Lezhneva, Armonia Aeterna, George Petrou, Decca, 2012
- Vivaldi, Scarlatti, Caldara: Cantatas, compilation box 3CD Capriccio, 2012
- Gluck: Ezio 1750 version, Topi Lehtipuu, Sonia Prina, Ann Hallenberg, Julian Pregardien, Mayuko Karasawa, Il Complesso Barocco, Alan Curtis, Virgin, 2011
- Duetti, Philippe Jaroussky William Christie, Virgin, 2011
- Vivaldi: Farnace, Max Emanuel Cencic, Ruxandra Donose, Mary-Ellen Nesi, Ann Hallenberg, Karina Gauvin, Daniel Behle, Emiliano Gonzalez Toro, I Barocchisti, Diego Fasolis, Virgin, 2011
- Handel: Mezzo-Soprano Opera Arias, I Barocchisti, Diego Fasolis, Virgin, 2010
- Handel: Faramondo, Philippe Jaroussky, Sophie Karthäuser, Choeur de la Radio Suisse, I Barocchisti, Diego Fasolis, Virgin, 2009
- Handel: Rodrigo, Al Ayre Espanol Eduardo Lopez Banzo, Ambroisie 2008
- Rossini: Opera Arias & Ouvertures, Michael Hofstetter, Virgin, 2008
- Handel: Fernando (Sosarme), Il Complesso Barocco, Alan Curtis, Virgin, 2007
- Domenico Scarlatti: Scarlatti Cantatas Vol. 2, Harpsichord: Aline Zylberajch, Lute and Gitarre: Yasunori Imamura, Cello: Maya Amrein Capriccio, 2006
- Gluck: Ezio (1750), Max Emanuel Cencic, Matthias Rexroth, Neue Düsseldorfer Hofmusik, Andreas Stoehr, Coviello, 2006
- Caldara: Caldara Cantatas, Capriccio, 2005
- Vivaldi and others: Andromeda Liberata, Andrea Marcon, Archiv, 2004
- The Vivaldi Album, Karsten Erik Ose, Capriccio, 2004
- Domenico Scarlatti: Cantate d'amore, Karsten Erik Ose, Capriccio, 2003

DVD

- Handel: Arminio, Max Emanuel Cencic, Juan Sancho, Lauren Snouffer, Owen Willetts, Aleksandra Kubas-Kruk, Gaia Petrone, Armonia Atenea, George Petrou, Karlsruhe, CMajor, 2017
- Vinci: Artaserse, Philippe Jaroussky, Max Emanuel Cencic, Valer Barna-Sabadus, Franco Fagioli, Concerto Köln, Diego Fasolis, Warner Music Group Germany, 2012
- Monteverdi: L'incoronazione di Poppea, Philippe Jaroussky (Nerone), Danielle de Niese (Poppea), Anna Bonitatibus (Ottavia), Max Emanuel Cencic (Ottone), Les Arts Florissants, William Christie, Virgin, 2012
- Monteverdi: L'incoronazione di Poppea, Sonya Yoncheva (Poppée), Max Emanuel Cencic (Néron), Ann Hallenberg (Octavie), Tim Mead (Othon), Paul Whelan (Sénèque) & Amel Brahim-Djelloul (Drusilla), Le Concert d'Astrée, Emmanuelle Haïm (conductor) & Jean-François Sivadier (stage director), Virgin, 2013
- Stefano Landi: Il Sant' Alessio, Philippe Jaroussky, Max Emanuel Cencic, Alain Buet, Xavier Sabata, Damien Guillon, Pascal Bertin, Terry Wey, Les Arts Florissants, William Christie, Virgin, 2007
