= Catone in Utica =

Opera libretto by Metastasio

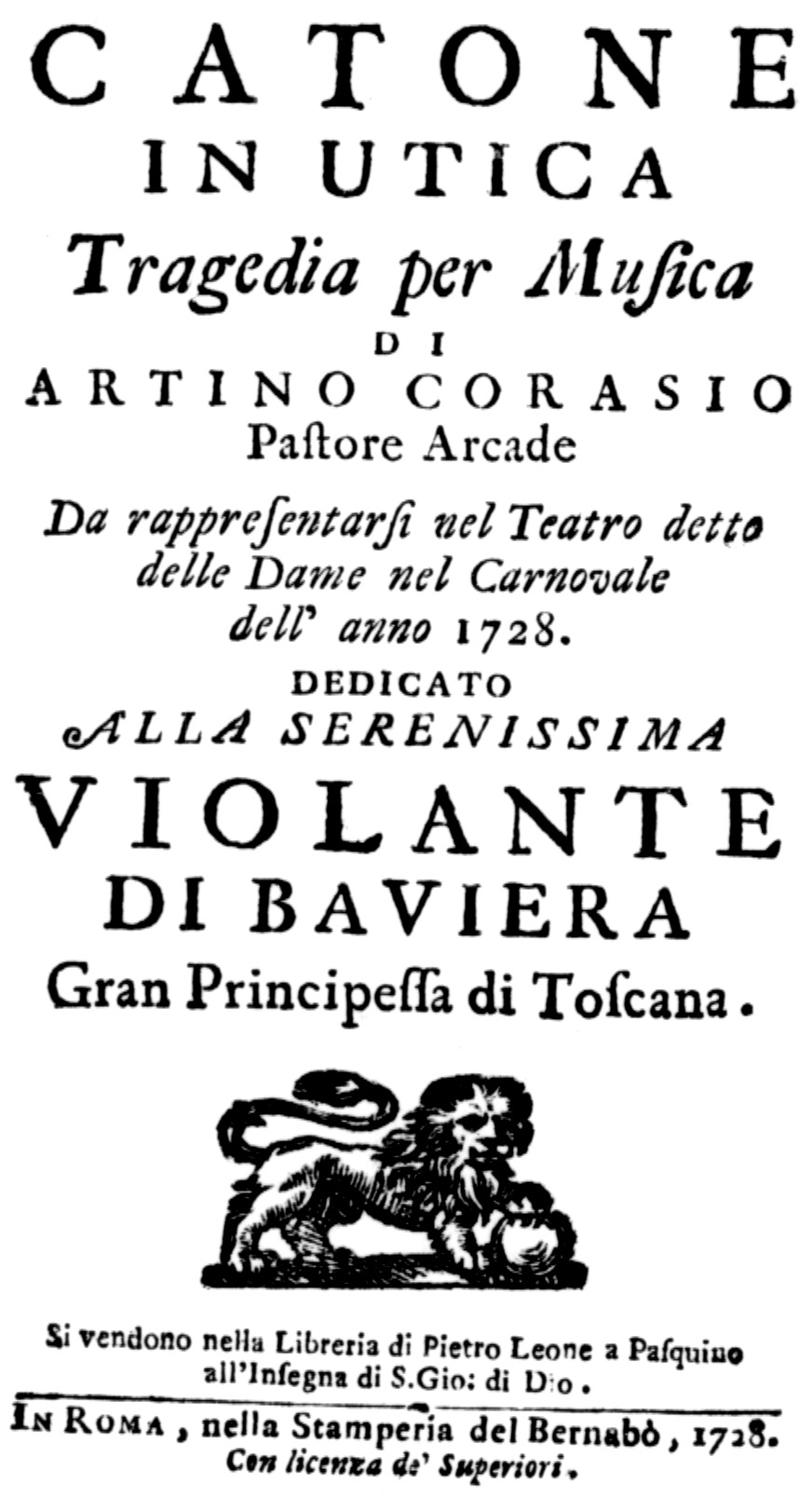
Title page of the libretto of Leonardo Vinci's Catone in Utica (Rome 1728)

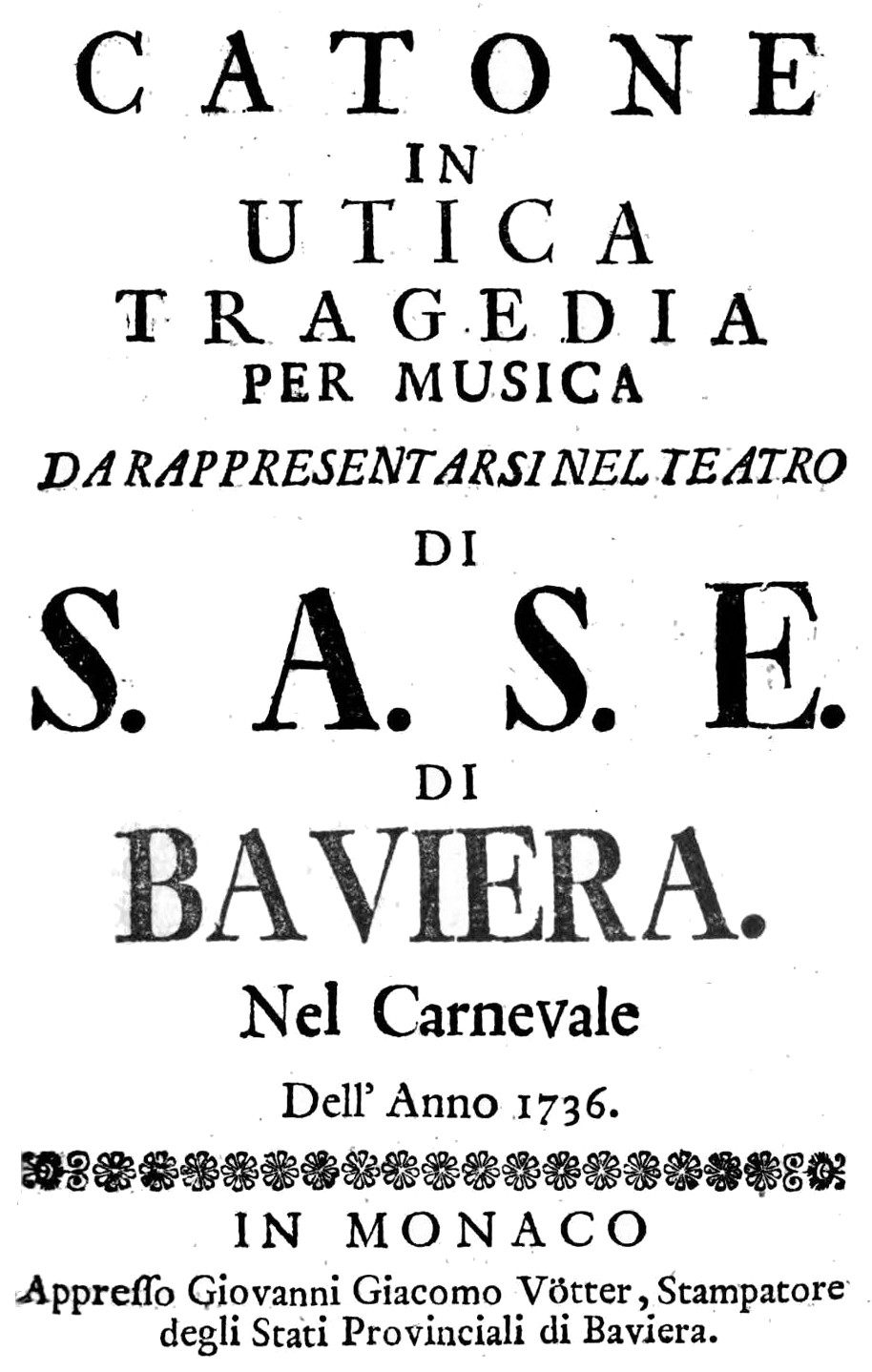
Italian title page of the libretto of Pietro Torri's Catone in Utica (Munich 1736)

Catone in Utica (Italian pronunciation: [kaˈtoːne in ˈuːtika]; transl. Cato at Utica) is an opera libretto by Metastasio, that was originally written for Leonardo Vinci's 1727 opera. Following Vinci's success, Metastasio's text was used by numerous composers of the baroque and classical eras for their own operas, including Pietro Torri (1736), Antonio Vivaldi (1737), Giovanni Battista Ferrandini (1753) and J. C. Bach (1761).

== History ==
Before Metastasio's Catone in Utica libretto, Cato the Younger had already been the subject of following operas:

- Catone il giovane, by Bartolomeo Monari, libretto by Giovanni Battista Neri (Bologna 1688)
- Catone Uticensi, by Carlo Francesco Pollarolo (Venice 1701)
- Cato, German opera by Reinhard Keiser, text after Matteo Noris (Hamburg 1715)

Metastasio wrote Catone in Utica in Italian, as a libretto for an opera in three acts. He changed the name of Cornelia to Emilia and that of Juba to Arbace, as better suited for music. Leonardo Vinci set the libretto to music for the first time. Vinci's opera was premiered at the Teatro delle Dame, Rome, during the carnival of 1727.

== Content ==
The subject of the libretto is the death of Cato the Younger, set in Utica. Following characters are represented:

- Catone (Cato the Younger)
- Cesare (Julius Caesar)
- Marzia, daughter of Catone, secretly in love with Cesare
- Arbace, Prince of Numidia, friend of Catone and lover of Marzia
- Emilia, widow of Pompeo (Pompey)
- Fulvio, legate of the Roman Senate and lover of Emilia.

== Operas ==
Metastasio's libretto was also set by:

- Geminiano Giacomelli, Vienna, 1727
- Leonardo Leo, Venice, 1729
- Johann Adolph Hasse, Turin, 1732
- George Frederick Handel, London, 1732, a pasticcio adapted mainly from Leo's 1729 setting, but transposing, editing or even entirely replacing its various arias to suit the skills of the singers he had at his disposal; some of the interpolated arias included pre-existing compositions by Porpora, Antonio Vivaldi, Hasse, and Leonardo Vinci.
- Pietro Torri, Munich, 1736
- Antonio Vivaldi, Venice and Verona, 1737
- Egidio Duni, Italy, about 1738
- Giovanni Verocai, Brunswick, 1743
- Carl Heinrich Graun, Berlin, 1744
- Niccolò Jommelli, Vienna, 1749
- Giovanni Battista Ferrandini, Munich, 1758
- Vincenzo Legrenzo Ciampi, Venice, 1750
- Florian Leopold Gassmann, Vienna, about 1760
- Johann Christian Bach, Naples, 1761
- Gian Francesco de Majo, Naples, 1763
- Niccolò Piccinni, Naples, 1770
- Bernardo Ottani, Naples, 1777
- Gaetano Andreozzi, Milan, 1782
- Giovanni Paisiello, Naples, 1788
- Peter Winter, Venice, 1791.

== Sources ==
- Champlin, John Denison Jr (1888–90). Apthorp, William Foster (ed.). Cyclopedia of Music and Musicians. New York: Charles Scribner's Sons.
  - Volume I
  - Volume II
  - Volume III
