= Orlandini =

Orlandini is an Italian surname. Notable people with the surname include:

- Giulio Orlandini, Italian painter
- Giuseppe Orlandini (1922–20??), Italian film director and screenwriter
- Giuseppe Maria Orlandini (1676–1760), Italian Baroque composer
- Leovanna Orlandini (born 1978), Ecuadorian beauty pageant winner
- Lia Orlandini (1896–1979), Italian actress
- Niccolò Orlandini (1554–1606), Italian Jesuit writer
- Pierluigi Orlandini (born 1972), Italian footballer
- Raúl Orlandini (1952–2006), Peruvian racing driver
- Rodolfo Orlandini (1905–1990), Argentine footballer and manager
- Vincenzo Orlandini (1910–1961), Italian football referee
