= Conservati fedele =

1765 concert aria by W. A. Mozart

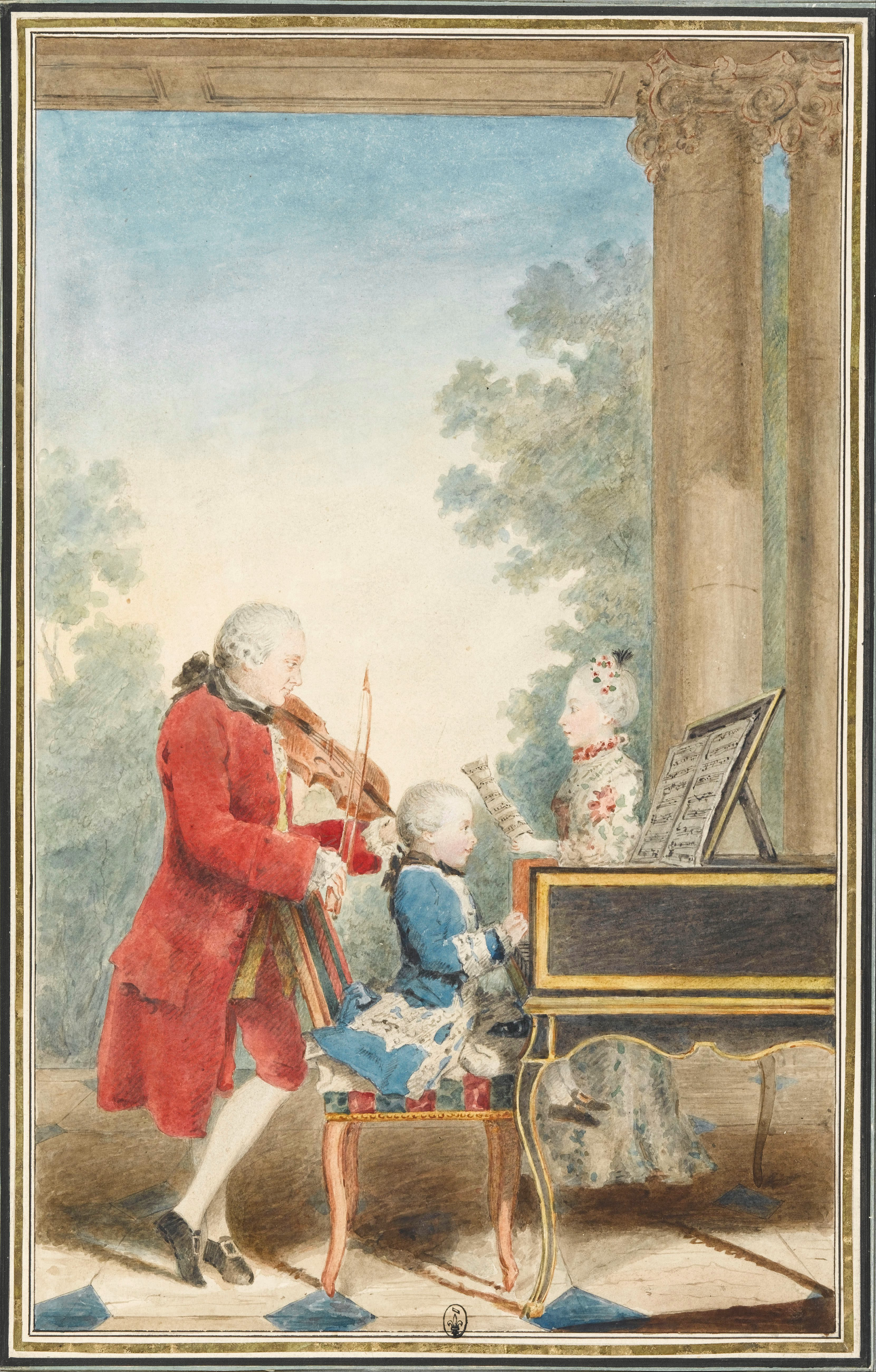
Carmontelle's 1763–64 Mozart family portrait in Paris

"Conservati fedele" (K. 23) is a concert aria for soprano and orchestra by Wolfgang Amadeus Mozart.

== History ==
Mozart composed the aria in October 1765 while staying at The Hague during the family's British-European tour when he was nine years old. Both of the Mozart children, Wolfgang and his sister Nannerl, were quite ill at the time. It was slightly revised in January 1766, possibly for a performance for Princess Carolina of Orange-Nassau. In his list of Wolfgang's works which he started in 1768 in Vienna, his father Leopold entered this piece as no. 2 of 15 Italian Arias, composed in London and The Hague (German: 15 Italiänische Arien theils in London, theils im Haag Componiert).

The Newberry Library (Case MS 6A, 48), Chicago, acquired the manuscript (6 sheets, 11 pages) through a bequest of the opera singer Claire Dux (Mrs Charles H. Swift). It was previously owned by Raphael Georg Kiesewetter who gave the autograph to Aloys Fuchs as a gift. Both Fuchs and Maximilian Stadler confirmed its authenticity with their signatures on 7 December 1832. The Neue Mozart-Ausgabe also mentions an autograph (4 sheets, 7 pages) at the Bibliothèque nationale de France in its Malherbe collection.

== Libretto ==
The text is taken from Metastasio's libretto Artaserse which had been set to music by a number of composers, among them Johann Christian Bach whom Mozart had met just a short time before in London. Other Mozart works based on Metastasio texts include his last opera, La clemenza di Tito, and the earlier Il re pastore.

The lyrics chosen by Mozart are the parting verses of Artaserse's sister, Mandane, in act 1, scene 1, as she bids farewell to her lover Arbace:

Conservati fedele;
Pensa ch'io resto, e peno,
E qualche volta almeno
Ricordati di me.

Ch'io per virtù d'amore,
Parlando col mio core,
Ragionerò con te.

Stay and remain faithful;
Think how I grieve alone here,
And sometimes at the least
Remember me.

While I by power of love
Talking to my own heart
Converse with thee.

The text of "Conservati fedele" has also been set to music by Leonardo Vinci (1690–1730) and Hasse (1699–1783) in their respective operas Artaserse, by Antonio Salieri and Marianne von Martines (1744–1812) as concert arias, twice by Joseph Martin Kraus (1756–1792), by Ferdinando Carulli (1770–1841) for voice and guitar, and by Theodor von Schacht (1748–1823) as a canon for three equal voices accompanied by cembalo and/or guitar.

== Music ==
The work is scored for soprano, two violins, viola, cello and bass; the tempo marking is Andante grazioso, the time signature is 2/4 time, the key signature is A major. A typical performance takes about seven minutes.

It is composed as a da capo aria (bars 1–86) with a short middle section ("Ch'io per virtù d'amore", bars 87–100) which has the tempo marking Allegretto and is in the parallel key of A minor.
