= Ezio (Mysliveček, 1775) =

Opera by Josef Mysliveček (1775)

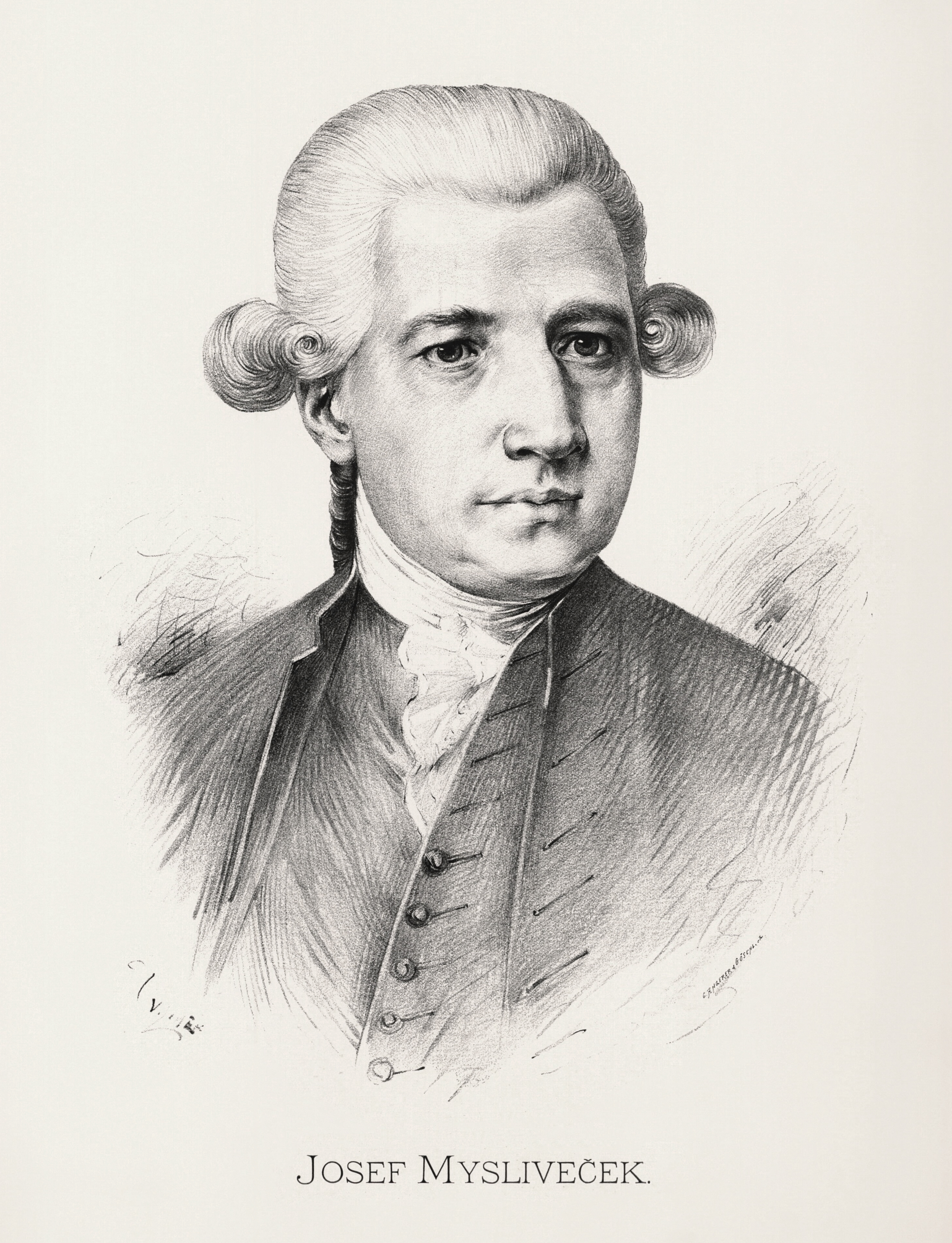
Josef Mysliveček

Ezio is an eighteenth-century Italian opera in 3 acts by the Czech composer Josef Mysliveček. It was the composer's first setting of a libretto by the Italian poet Metastasio that was first performed with music by Nicola Porpora in 1728, one of the most popular of the Metastasian librettos in Mysliveček's day. The story is based on incidents from the lives of the 5th-century Roman emperor Valentinian III and his general Aetius. For a performance in the 1770s, it would only be expected that a libretto of such age would be abbreviated and altered to suit contemporary operatic taste. The cuts and changes in the text made for the 1775 performance of Mysliveček's opera are not attributable. All of Mysliveček's operas are of the serious type in Italian language referred to as opera seria that usually featured the designation dramma per musica in librettos.

== Performance history ==
The opera was first performed at the Teatro San Carlo in Naples on 30 May 1775 in honor of the nameday of Ferdinand, the king of Naples. It was the last of a series of four operas composed by Mysliveček for the Teatro San Carlo between 1773 and 1775: the others were Romolo ed Ersilia (1773), Artaserse (1774), and Demofoonte (1775). The last two of these commissions were made possible by the failure of Johann Christian Bach to make good on a commitment to the management of the theater to provide operas for the 1774-75 operatic season. Ezio (and all three of the other operas from this series) were very well received by the Neapolitan musical public. The cast of Ezio was distinguished, as would be expected at the San Carlo; it included the castrato Gaspare Pacchierotti. Mysliveček's Ezio of 1775 was first revived in modern times in Prague in 1937.

== Connection with Mozart ==
The musicologist Daniel E. Freeman has demonstrated that Mozart used Mysliveček's scene and aria, "Misera, dove son?/Ah, non so io che parlo," as a partial model for his own setting of the same texts, K. 369.

== Roles ==
Role	Voice type	Premiere cast, 30 May 1775, Teatro San Carlo, Naples
Valentiniano III, emperor of Rome, in love with Fulvia	soprano castrato	Giuseppe Benedetti
Fulvia, daughter of Massimo, a Roman patrician, in love with Ezio and betrothed to him	soprano	Anna de Amicis-Buonsollazzi
Ezio, general of the imperial armies, in love with Fulvia	soprano castrato	Gaspare Pacchierotti
Onoria, sister of Valentiniano, secretly in love with Ezio	soprano	Elisabetta Ranieri
Massimo, Roman patrician, father of Fulvia, confidant and secret enemy of Valentiniano	tenor	Arcangelo Cortoni
Varo, prefect of the Praetorian guard, friend of Ezio	soprano castrato	Nicola Lancelotti

== Vocal set pieces ==
Act I, scene 2 - Aria of Valentiniano, "Se tu la reggi al volo"
Act I, scene 3 - Aria of Ezio, "Pensa a serbarmi, o cara"
Act I, scene 4 - Aria of Varo, "Più lieti imagini" [a non-Metastasian text]
Act I, scene 5 - Aria of Fulvia, "Caro padre, a me non dei"
Act I, scene 6 - Accompanied recitative for Massimo, "Che sventura è la mia"
Act I, scene 6 - Aria of Massimo, "Il nocchier che si figura"
Act I, scene 8 - Aria of Onoria, "Quanto mai felici siete"
Act I, scene 12 - Accompanied recitative for Ezio and Fulvia, "Fu questo il primo oggetto"
Act I, scene 12 - Duet for Ezio and Fulvia, "Mia vita, se m'ami" [a non-Metastasian text]

Act II, scene 3 - Aria of Valentiniano, "Vi fida lo sposo"
Act II, scene 4 - Aria of Massimo, "Va, dal furor portata"
Act II, scene 6 - Aria of Ezio, "Recagli quell'acciaro"
Act II, scene 7 - Aria of Varo, "Mostra per poco almeno" [a non-Metastasian text]
Act II, scene 9 - Aria of Onoria, "Fin che per te mi palpita"
Act II, scene 11 - Aria of Ezio, "Caro mio bene, addio"
Act II, scene 12 - Aria of Valentiniano, "A tuo dispetto ingrata" [a non-Metastasian text]
Act II, scene 13 - Accompanied recitative for Fulvia, "Misera, dove son?"
Act II, scene 13 - Aria of Fulvia, "Ah, non son io che parlo"

Act III, scene 2 - Aria of Ezio, "Mi dona, mi rende" [a non-Metastasian text]
Act III, scene 6 - Aria of Massimo, "Tergi l'ingiuste lagrime"
Act III, scene 7 - Aria of Fulvia, "Dei clementi amici" [a non-Metastasian text]

== Score ==
The complete score of Mysliveček's Ezio of 1775 is available for study online on the Italian website Internet Culturale in the form of a reproduction of a manuscript once in the possession of the Teatro San Carlo of Naples.

== See also ==
- Ezio, 1777 version
