= Diego Fasolis =

Swiss conductor & organist (born 1958)

- Born: 19 April 1958 (age 68); Lugano, Switzerland
- Education: Zurich Conservatory; Musikhochschule Zürich
- Occupations: Organist; Conductor
- Organizations: Radio Svizzera Italiana; I Barrocchisti
- Awards: ECHO Klassik

Diego Fasolis (born 19 April 1958) is a Swiss classical organist and conductor, the leader of the ensemble I Barocchisti. (Note: Fanfare – Joel Flegler – Volume 32, Numéro 5 – Page 145, 2009 "Diego Fasolis is rapidly becoming one of my favorite period practitioners — and considering my past feeling towards period practice this is no light statement — adding some much needed Italianate warmth and humanity ...") He has conducted operas in historically informed performance at major European opera houses and festivals, and has made award-winning recordings.

== Career ==
Born in Lugano, Fasolis studied in Zurich, at both the Zurich Conservatory and the Musikhochschule, organ with Erich Vollenwyder, piano with Jürg Wintschger, voice with Carol Smith, and conducting with Klaus Knall, achieving all four diplomas with distinction. He further studied organ and organ improvisation with Gaston Litaize in Paris, and historically informed performance (HIP) with Michael Radulescu. In 1985 and 1986, he performed the complete organ works by Johann Sebastian Bach, Felix Mendelssohn and Franz Liszt. He received several international awards such as the Stresa first prize, the first prize and scholarship of the Migros-Göhner Foundation, the Hegar Prize, and the Traetta Prize 2020, and he was a finalist in the Geneva Competition. From 1986, he worked for the broadcaster Radio Svizzera Italiana, and in 1993 became director of its chorus and instrumental ensemble.

Fasolis was focused on historically informed performance (HIP) and founded in 1995 the instrumental ensemble Vanitas in Lugano. Three years later he became director of the ensemble I Barocchisti, recording with them several works by Bach, George Frideric Handel and Antonio Vivaldi. His recording of Handel's Faramondo was acclaimed by critics; Margarida Mota-Bull noted that "I Barocchisti and the Coro della Radio Svizzera under the excellent direction of Diego Fasolis deliver a remarkably well-judged and restrained interpretation of this opera by Handel", and Tim Ashley wrote in The Guardian: "A cool, brilliant operatic game, it's devastatingly realised by Diego Fasolis and I Barocchisti".

Fasolis toured with his ensembles in southern and central Europe. He conducted performances of operas in HIP at theatres such as La Scala, Théâtre des Champs-Élysées and Opéra de Lausanne, where he conducted Faramondo in 2009, Rinaldo in 2011, Josef Mysliveček's Farnace in 2011, Vinci's Artaserse in 2012, Vivaldi's Dorilla in Tempe in 2014, Mozart's Die Zauberflöte in 2015, and Handel's Ariodante in 2016. Fasolis made his debut as conductor at the Salzburg Pentecost Festival with a revival of Niccolò Jommelli's oratorio Isacco figura del Redentore in 2013. At the Salzburg Festival the same year, he conducted Bellini's Norma. He returned in 2014 for two concerts and two operas, Norma again and Gluck's Iphigénie en Tauride, both with Bartoli in the title role. In 2017, he conducted a new production of Monteverdi's L’incoronazione di Poppea for the reopening of the Staatsoper Unter den Linden in Berlin. Staged by Eva Höckmayr, he conducted the Akademie für Alte Musik, with Anna Prohaska as Poppea, Max Emanuel Cencic as Nerone and Mark Milhofer as Arnalta. He expanded the music including dances by Francesco Cavalli, Filiberto Laurenzi, Francesco Sacrati and Benededetto Ferrari, and writing a rich orchestration, performed also by musicians from I Barocchisti.

== Recordings ==
In 2001, Fasolis recorded with the mezzo-soprano Guillemette Laurens, Saint-Saëns’s Requiem for Chandos (2004), in 2012, he recorded Leonardo Vinci's opera Artaserse with Concerto Köln. The recording made it to the German album charts. He has collaborated regularly with singers such as Philippe Jaroussky, Max Emanuel Cenčić, Cecilia Bartoli, and the recorder player Maurice Steger. In 2013, he received the ECHO Klassik in the category "Opera recording of the year" with works from the 17th and 18th centuries.

- Leonardo Vinci: Artaserse (Philippe Jaroussky et al., Virgin Classics, 2012)
- Steffani: Stabat Mater (2013)
