= Valer Barna-Sabadus =

Romanian-German counter tenor

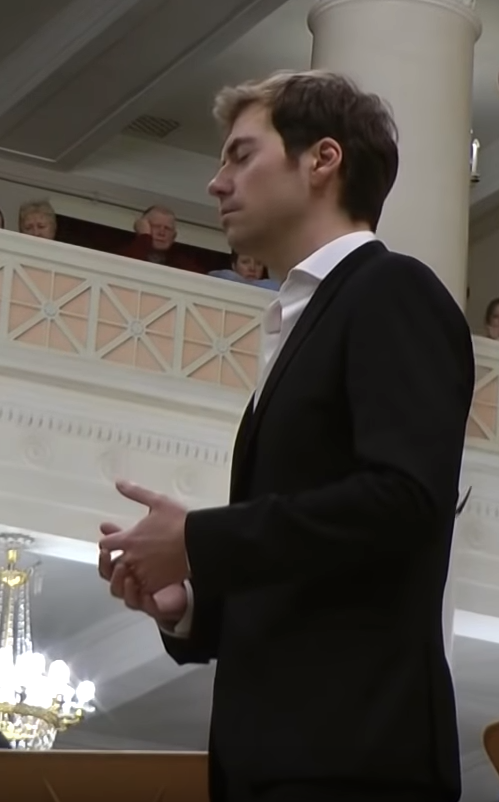
Valer Barna-Sabadus, 2019

Valer Barna-Săbăduș (born 15 January 1986), also Valer Sabadus, is a Romanian-German countertenor. He sings in both the alto and soprano range.

== Life ==
Barna-Sabadus was born in Arad (Romania), near the Hungarian border. He is the child of a pianist and a cellist. His father died in 1990 when Valer was four years old. In 1991, after the end of the Ceaușescu regime, his family emigrated to Germany and he grew up in Landau an der Isar, Lower Bavaria.

Barna-Sabadus received his first musical education in violin and piano. At the age of 17, he began his studies as a countertenor at the Hochschule für Musik und Theater München with Gabriele Fuchs. In 2009, he became a member of the Bayerische Theaterakademie August Everding, where he completed his postgraduate studies with distinction in 2013. Already before that, he sang important roles in his field under various conductors such as Orpheus in Orfeo ed Euridice by Christoph Willibald Gluck, the title role in Rinaldo by Georg Friedrich Händel, Endimione in La Calisto by Francesco Cavalli and Sesto in La clemenza di Tito by Wolfgang Amadeus Mozart. After many years in Munich he settled in Cologne in 2018.

Barna-Sabadus has collaborated with other countertenors in Leonardo Vinci's Artaserse tour. He debuted in the title role of Handel's Serse at the Deutsche Oper am Rhein. In 2013, he made his debut at the Aix-en-Provence Festival as Menelao in Cavalli's opera Elena. Since 2014, he has been under contract with the major label Sony Classical. At the Händel-Festspiele Karlsruhe and at the Badisches Staatstheater Karlsruhe he sang the title role of Handel's Teseo.

== Repertoire ==
- Rinaldo in Rinaldo by G. F. Handel
- Endimione in Diana amante by Giuseppe Antonio Bernabei
- Puck in The Fairy-Queen by Henry Purcell
- Totes Gretchen Aventure Faust (2008) 3 scenes after Goethe, Heine and Birgit Müller-Wieland by Jan Müller-Wieland (premiere)
- Adrasto in Demofoonte by Niccolò Jommelli
- Enea in Didone abbandonata by Niccolò Jommelli
- Ruggiero in Orlando furioso by Antonio Vivaldi
- Sesto in La clemenza di Tito by Mozart
- Iarba in Didone abbandonata by Johann Adolph Hasse
- Orfeo in Orfeo ed Euridice by Christoph Willibald Gluck
- Endimione in La Calisto by Francesco Cavalli
- Semira in Artaserse by Leonardo Vinci
- A young man, the young Syrian, Herodias in Last Desire by Lucia Ronchetti
- Liscione in La Dirindina by Giovanni Battista Martini
- Armindo in Partenope by Georg Friedrich Händel
- Xerxes in Serse by Georg Friedrich Händel
- Menelao in Elena by Francesco Cavalli
- Leucippo in Leucippo by Johann Adolph Hasse October
- Teseo in Teseo by Georg Friedrich Händel
- Nerone in L’incoronazione di Poppea by Claudio Monteverdi
- Giasone in Il Giasone by Francesco Cavalli
- Ruggiero in Alcina by G. F. Handel

== Recordings ==
- Nicola Conforto, Nicola Porpora, Antonio Caldara among others: Caro Gemello – Farinelli and Metastasio. Concerto Köln. Sony Classical, 2018.
- Georg Friedrich Händel: Händel Goes Wild. L’Arpeggiata, dir. Christina Pluhar. Erato Records, 2017.
- Sacred Duets. Duette und Arien aus Oratorien von Alessandro Scarlatti, Bernardo Pasquini, Giovanni Paolo Colonna, Domenico Gabrielli, Giovanni Battista Bononcini, Antonio Lotti, Antonio Caldara, Nicola Antonio Porpora (plus Violinkonzert op.8,8 byt Giuseppe Torelli). With Nuria Rial, Kammerorchester Basel, dir. Julia Schröder. Sony Classical, 2017.
- Antonio Caldara: Caldara. Nouvo Aspetto, dir. Michael Dücker. Sony Classical, 2015.
- Rachmaninoff: Symphony Nr. 2, Vocalise. Gürzenich Orchestra Cologne, dir. Dmitrij Kitajenko. Oehms Classics, 2015.
- Wolfgang Amadeus Mozart: Mozart Castrato Arias. recreation – Großes Orchester Graz, dir. Michael Hofstetter. Oehms Classics, 2015.
- Christoph Willibald Gluck, Antonio Sacchini: Le belle immagini. Hofkapelle München, dir. Allessandro De Marchi. Sony Classical, 2014.
- Francesco Cavalli: Elena.Cappella Mediteranea, dir. Leonardo García Alarcón. DVD. Ricercar/Outhere Music, 2014.
- Gluck: La clemenza di Tito. l’arte del mondo, dir. Werner Erhardt. Harmonia mundi, 2014.
- Leonardo Vinci: Artaserse. Concerto Köln, dir. Diego Fasolis. DVD, Erato/Warner Classics, 2014.
- Johann Adolph Hasse: Didone abbandonata. Hofkapelle München, dir. Michael Hofstetter. Naxos, 2013.
- Trialog – Music for the One God. Pera-Ensemble. Berlin Classics (Edel), 2013.
- Johann Sebastian Bach: Hohe Messe h-Moll. Martin Steidler, Madrigalchor der Hochschule für Musik und Theater München, Studio für historische Aufführungspraxis und Studierende der Bläser- und Streicherklassen, Hochschule für Musik und Theater München. 2013.
- Leonardo Vinci: Artaserse. Concerto Köln, dir. Diego Fasolis. CD. Virgin Classics (EMI), 2012.
- Enjott Schneider: Requiem Im Namen der Rose. Johannes Skudlik: Ambiente Audio, 2012.
- John Dowland, Henry Purcell: To touch, to kiss, to die – English Songs. Olga Watts, Axel Wolf, Pavel Serbin. Oehms Classics, 2013.
- Café – Orient meets Occident. Pera-Ensemble. Berlin Classics (Edel), 2012.
- Giovanni Battista Pergolesi: Stabat Mater – Laudate Pueri. Valer Barna-Sabadus, Terry Wey, Neumeyer Consort, Barock Vokal aus Mainz, Dir. Michael Hofstetter. Oehms Classics, 2012.
- Johann Adolph Hasse: Hasse reloaded. Hofkapelle München, dir. Michael Hofstetter. Oehms Classics, 2012.
- Claudio Monteverdi, Ali Ufki, Giulio Caccini, among others: Baroque Oriental. Pera-Ensemble, Mehmet C. Yeșilçay. Berlin Classics (Edel), 2011.
- Kaffee für den König. Pera-Ensemble. T-Lounge (Edel), 2011.
- 400 Jahre Marianische Männerkongregation – Festmusik in der Bürgersaalkirche München. Michael Hartmann. Oehms Classics, 2010.

== Awards ==
- Musical America, New artist of the month, Juli 2009
- ECHO Klassik 2012, Klassik-ohne-Grenzen-Preis
- Preis der Deutschen Schallplattenkritik 2012
- ICMA Award, "Young Artist of the Year Vocal", 2013
- Echo Klassik 2015 – Solistische Einspielung des Jahres (Gesang / Opernarien): Valer Sabadus / Hofkapelle München / Alessandro De Marchi – C.W. Gluck: Le belle immagini.
- Handel Prize 2020
- Musikpreis der Stadt Duisburg 2021
