= Franco Fagioli =

Argentine countertenor

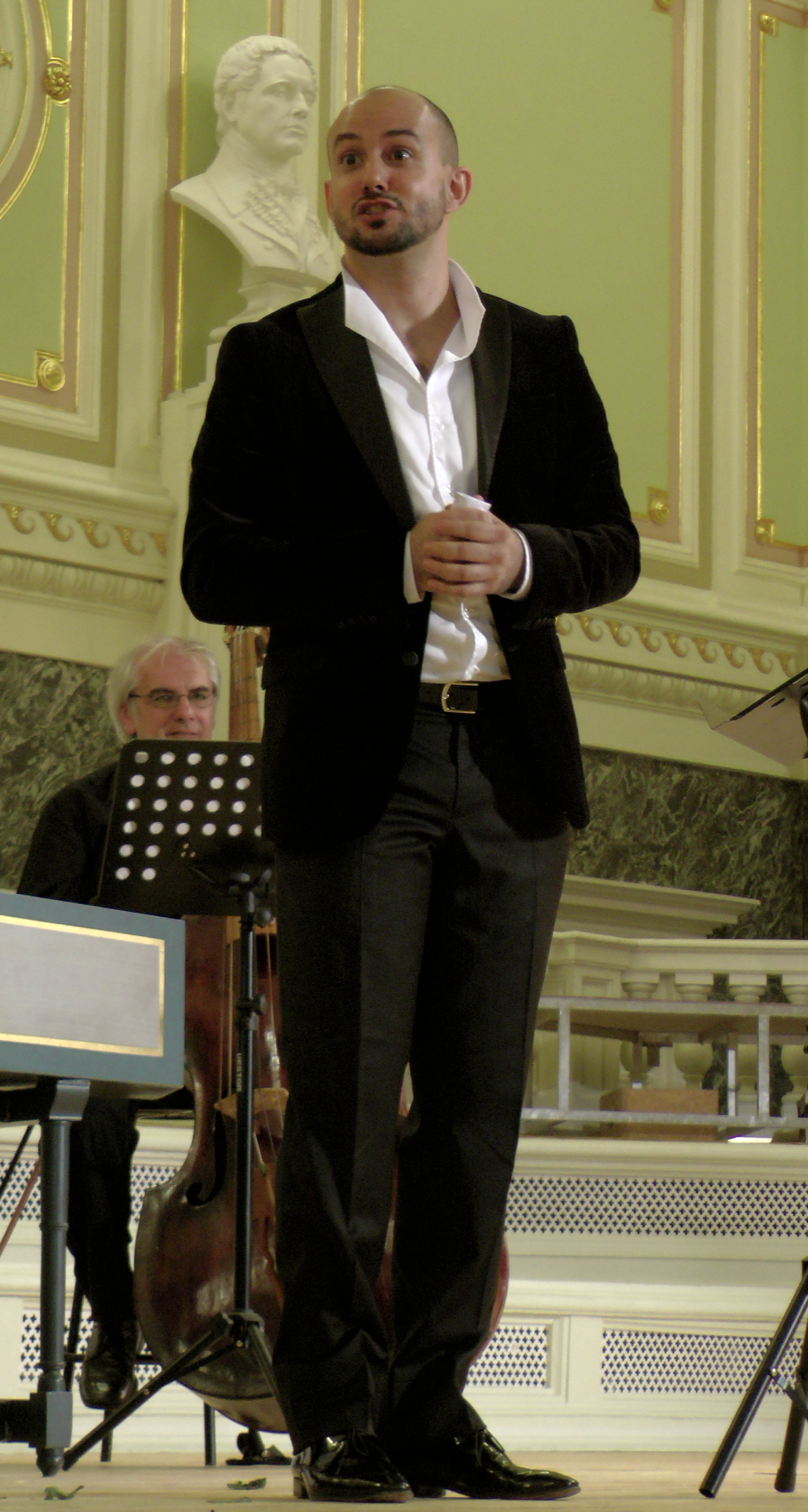

Background information
- Born: May 4, 1981 (age 45); San Miguel de Tucumán, Tucumán, Argentina
- Genre: Opera
- Occupation: Musician
- Instrument: Singing
- Years active: 2003–present
- Labels: Sony; Deutsche Harmonia Mundi; Decca; Naïve; Pentatone
- Website: franco-fagioli.info

Franco Maximiliano Fagioli (born May 4 1981, in San Miguel de Tucumán, Tucumán) is an Argentine operatic countertenor.

== Life ==
Born in Argentina, Fagioli initially studied piano and then singing at the Superior Art Institute of the Teatro Colón in Buenos Aires. He began his international career in 2003, when he won the Bertelsmann singing competition Neue Stimmen in Gütersloh, Germany.

Franco Fagioli has since made regular appearances at opera houses in Buenos Aires, Karlsruhe, Bonn, Zurich, Essen and Genoa, at the Theater an der Wien in Vienna and the Théâtre des Champs-Elysées in Paris. He has also been invited to perform at a number of festivals, including those in Halle, Ludwigsburg, Innsbruck and Froville.

He has worked with conductors such as Rinaldo Alessandrini, Alan Curtis, Gabriel Garrido, Nikolaus Harnoncourt, René Jacobs, José Manuel Quintana, Marc Minkowski, Riccardo Muti and Christophe Rousset.

External videos
- "Vo solcando un mar crudele", Arbace's aria from Artaserse by Leonardo Vinci on YouTube
- "Parto qual pastorello", Arbace's aria from Artaserse by Johann Adolph Hasse on YouTube
- "Spesso di nubi cinto", Adalgiso's aria from Carlo il Calvo by Nicola Porpora on YouTube

Franco Fagioli is one of the five countertenors to appear in the opera, TV, CD and DVD production of Leonardo Vinci’s Artaserse, which has been awarded numerous national and international music prizes for example the Echo Award 2013 and 2014 or the Preis der deutschen Schallplattenkritik.

The 2013/2014 season was launched with the release of the CD Arias for Caffarelli, which includes many world premieres; this was accompanied by concerts in Germany, France and Denmark. Franco Fagioli made his debut at the 2014 Salzburg Whitsun Festival with his programme Giambattista Velluti. In the same year, there were two debuts with works by Mozart: after performing the part of Sesto in La clemenza di Tito in Nancy, he debuted as Idamante in Martin Kušej’s new production of Idomeneo at the Royal Opera House, Covent Garden, in November 2014.

In the autumn of 2014, his solo CD Il maestro Porpora – Arias was released, in which Franco Fagioli paid homage to the Italian composer and singing teacher Nicola Porpora (1686–1768). He also made an appearance on the CD Siroe – Re di Persia, which was released at about the same time, as well as featuring on a CD entitled La Concordia de’ pianeti, a rediscovered work by the Baroque composer Antonio Caldara.

== Discography ==
Solo recitals

- Arte Nova Voices. Händel, Mozart. Opera Arias Gustav Kuhn (ARTE NOVA) 2005.
- Franco Fagioli. Canzone e Cantate. (Carus Verlag/SWR) 2010.
- Arias for Caffarelli: Vinci, Leo, Hasse, Pergolesi, Santo. Il pomo d'oro. Riccardo Minasi (Naïve Records) 2013.
- Il Maestro Porpora – Arias (Naïve Records) 2014.
- Franco Fagioli. Rossini George Petrou (Deutsche Grammophon) 2016.
- Handel: Arias Zefira Valova (Deutsche Grammophon) 2018.
- Veni, Vidi, Vinci, Arias by Leonardo Vinci, Il pomo d'oro, Zefira Valova (Deutsche Grammophon), 2020.
- Anime Immortali - Kammerorchester Basel (PENTATONE), 2023.
- The Last Castrato - Arias for Velluti: Rossini, Bonfichi, Mercadante, Morlacchi, Nicolini (Château de Versailles Spectacles), 2025

Opera

- Christoph Willibald Gluck: Ezio (Oehms Classics/SWR) 2008.
- George Frideric Handel: Teseo (Carus Verlag/SWR) 2009.
- George Frideric Handel: Berenice (EMI/Virgin Classics) 2010.
- unknown composer: Germanico, Ottaviano Tenerani, (Sony/Deutsche Harmonia Mundi) 2011.
- Leonardo Vinci: Artaserse (Virgin Classics/EMI) 2013.
- Johann Adolph Hasse: Siroe (DECCA) 2014.
- Antonio Caldara: La concordia de' pianeti (ARCHIV) 2014.
- Gluck: Orfeo ed Euridice Laurence Equilbey (ARCHIV) 2015.
- Vinci: Catone in Utica Riccardo Minasi (DECCA) 2015.
- Giovanni Battista Pergolesi: Adriano in Siria Jan Tomasz Adamus (DECCA) 2016.
- Händel: Rodelinda Diego Fasolis (DYNAMIC) 2016.
- Händel: "Serse" Il Pomo d'Oro & Maxim Emelyanychev (Deutsche Grammophon) 2018
- Händel: Agrippina (Erato), 2020
- Zingarelli: Giulietta e Romeo - CD & DVD (concert version) (Château de Versailles Spectacles) 2021
- Mozart: Lucio Silla (Erato), 2022
- Porpora: Carlo il Calvo (Parnassus Arts Productions), 2023
- Zingarelli: Giulietta e Romeo - DVD (staged version) (Château de Versailles Spectacles) 2025
- Porpora: Polifemo - CD & DVD (Château de Versailles Spectacles) 2025

Sacred works

- Agostino Steffani: Stabat Mater (DECCA) 2014.
- Vivaldi: Gloria, Nisi Dominus, Nulla in mundo pax (Classica) 2018.
- Händel: Messiah. Franco Fagioli performed as a conductor (Château de Versailles Spectacles), 2023
