= Michael Maniaci =

American opera singer (born 1976)

Michael Maniaci (born May 3, 1976) is an American opera singer. Possessing a male soprano voice, Maniaci is noted for his claim to be able to sing into the upper soprano range without resorting to falsetto, an otherwise common phonation for men who sing in high registers, such as countertenors. Although this was possible for castrati because of the hormonal imbalance following castration, Maniaci claims that, for some unknown reason, his larynx did not develop and lengthen completely during puberty, causing his voice not to "break" in the usual manner. Maniaci claims that this physical particularity has given him the ability to sing in the soprano register without sounding like a typical countertenor or a female singer. There are, however, critics who claim that Maniaci actually sings in falsetto.

Maniaci is becoming an important presence on the international classical music scene, having already appeared in lead roles at companies such as the Metropolitan Opera, La Fenice, and Opera North. He is known mostly for singing the works of Handel, Mozart, and Monteverdi.

== Biography ==
=== Early life ===
Maniaci spent his early childhood in the American Midwest. During his early teens, his family relocated to Western Pennsylvania and resided in Peters Township, a small community located approximately twenty miles south of Pittsburgh. During his middle school years, Maniaci began to develop his musical skills within numerous school musicals, as well as a variety of community musical groups. He attended Peters Township High School, and graduated with the class of 1994.

=== Education ===
Michael Maniaci graduated from the Cincinnati Conservatory of Music with a bachelor's degree in Vocal Performance and went on to the Juilliard School of music where he graduated with a Masters in Vocal Performance. Maniaci first received notice when he received the Bronze Medal in the 1997 Rosa Ponselle International Opera Competition. He went on to gain experience with several prestigious American young artist programs such as Wolf Trap Opera, Glimmerglass Opera's Young American Artists Program, Aspen Opera Theater and the Tanglewood Music Festival.

In 1999, he won the Houston Grand Opera Competition. He is a winner of the 2002 Sara Tucker Study Grant and the 2002 Shoshana Foundation Career Grant. In 2003 he won the Metropolitan Opera National Council Auditions.

== Career ==
In the 2001–2002 season, Maniaci made his Carnegie Hall debut in Chichester Psalms with The Orchestra of St. Luke's, sang Nerone in L'Incoronazione di Poppea for Toronto's Opéra Atélier, and the title role in Xerxes with Wolf Trap Opera. In the 2002–2003 season, Maniaci made his European debut as Ulisse in Handel's Deidamia with the Goettingen International Handel Festival, his New York City Opera debut as the Sandman in Hänsel und Gretel, and his return to Glimmerglass Opera as Medoro in Handel's Orlando. In the 2003–2004 season, Maniaci sang Nerone in L'Incoronazione di Poppea with Chicago Opera Theater (which marked the opening of the company's new theatre), and with Cleveland Opera. He also sang the title role in Handel's Oreste with the Juilliard Opera Center, and at Glimmerglass Opera he appeared as Tirinto in Handel's Imeneo. That same year, Maniaci won the 2003 Metropolitan Opera National Council Auditions.

In 2004, Maniaci portrayed the role of Cherubino in Wolfgang Amadeus Mozart's The Marriage of Figaro with Pittsburgh Opera. This was the first time the role was performed by a man in the United States. In 2005, Maniaci made his debut performances with Santa Fe Opera singing the role of Lucio Cinna opposite Susan Graham's Cecilio in Mozart's Lucio Silla and his debut with the Royal Danish Opera. In 2006, Maniaci made his Metropolitan Opera debut in the role of Nireno in Handel's Giulio Cesare. In 2007, he made his debut with Opera North as Atis in The Fortunes of King Croesus and with La Fenice in the role of Armando in Giacomo Meyerbeer's Il crociato in Egitto. Also in 2007, Maniaci returned to Glimmerglass Opera to perform the title role in Gluck's Orfeo ed Euridice.

In 2008, Maniaci performed the role of Idamante in Mozart's Idomeneo re di Creta with Opera Atelier. and sang the title role in Xerxes with Boston Baroque. In 2009, Maniaci is scheduled to appear in Francesco Cavalli's Eliogabalo with the Grange Park Opera and return to Opera Atelier to perform Nerone in L'incoronazione di Poppea. In 2010 he will perform in Martín y Soler's L'arbore di Diana at the Liceu in Barcelona.

In 2010, Maniaci originated the role of Xiao Ching in the world premiere of Zhou Long's opera Madame White Snake with Opera Boston and the Beijing Music Festival.

Maniaci has also had a prolific concert schedule. His orchestral engagements have included appearances with Tafelmusik, the New Holland Baroque Orchestra, the Bridgehampton Chamber Music Festival, and a tour with Academie Baroque de Montréal throughout Canada and Germany. Maniaci has also performed with Boston Baroque and toured throughout Asia with the Shanghai Opera Orchestra. He has also been heard in concert with L'Opéra de Montréal.

In 2011, Maniaci played the role of Sesto, alongside Measha Brueggergosman as Vitellia, in Opera Atelier's production of La Clemenza di Tito in Toronto, Canada. He received a standing ovation on opening night, April 22, 2011. In 2014 he made his debut with the Cincinnati Opera as Endymion in La Calisto.

== Recording ==
- Meyerbeer: Il crociato in Egitto (Michael Maniaci, Patrizia Ciofi, Marco Vinco, Laura Polverelli, Fernando Portari, Iorio Zennaro, Silvia Pasini, Luca Favaron, Emanuele Pedrini; Orchestra and Chorus of Teatro La Fenice; Conductor: Emmanuel Villaume). Dynamic DV 33549 DVD.
- Mozart: Arias for Male Soprano (Michael Maniaci, Boston Baroque, Conductor: Martin Pearlman). Telarc International, TEL-31827-02. Released January 26, 2010.
