= Sarrasine (opera) =

2024 opera pastiche by George Petrou and Laurence Dale

Sarrasine (opera pastiche)
- Opera by George Petrou and Laurence Dale combining the never performed opera music by George Frideric Handel with the story and dialogues by Honoré de Balzac
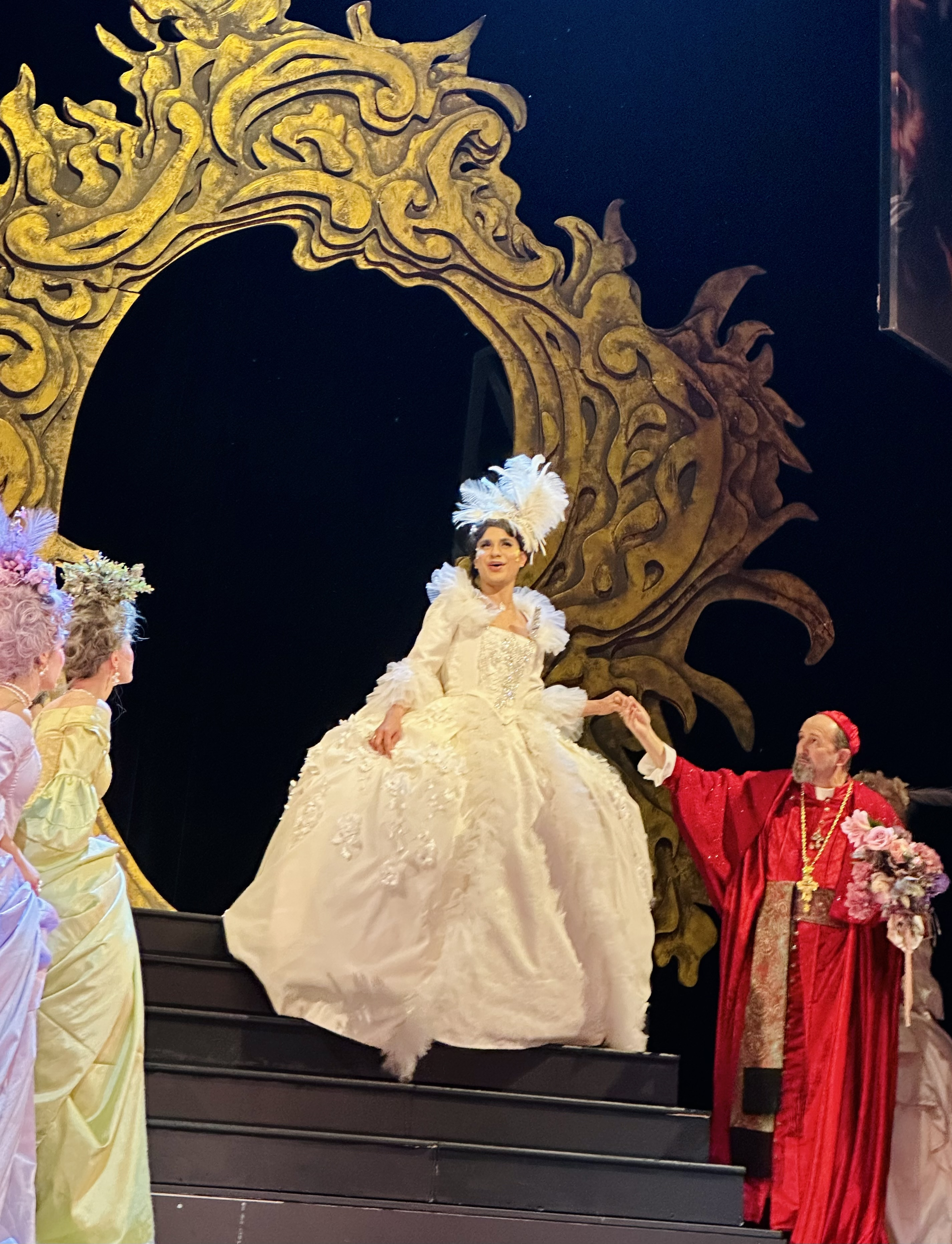
- Samuel Mariño created the role of Zambinella
- Librettist: spoken text and dialogues created by Laurence Dale on the basis of the original French text of Honoré de Balzac's novella Sarrasine; the texts of arias and duets are by various librettists of the works, for which they were originally written
- Language: Italian for arias and duets, French for spoken text and dialogues
- Based on: novella Sarrasine (1831) by Honoré de Balzac
- Premiere: 10 May 2024; Deutsches Theater, Göttingen

Sarrasine is an opera pastiche (pasticcio) conceived and created by George Petrou and Laurence Dale and premiered on 10 May 2024 at the Göttingen International Handel Festival. The overall story and the dialogues of the opera are based on the eponymous novella by Honoré de Balzac published in 1830. The music consists of arias, duets, and other pieces that George Frideric Handel composed for specific operas but then either cut entirely or replaced with significantly modified versions. The opera sets Handel's unperformed music within the narrative from the Romantic era that is itself preoccupied and inspired by the issues of voice, gender, and art that emerged during Handel's time. According to its co-creators, the opera engages the issues of "identity, gender, sexuality and love."

== Cast and musicians ==
Roles, voice types, premiere cast
Role	Voice type	Cast of the 10 May 2024 premiere and all festival performances
Zambinella	male soprano	Samuel Mariño
Sarrasine	tenor	Juan Sancho
Madame de Rochefide	soprano	Myrsini Margariti
Balzac	bass-baritone	Sreten Manojlović
Monsieur de Lanty, Cardinal	-	Florian Eppinger
Madame de Lanty	-	Marina Lara Poltman
Viennese Fop	-	Ronny Thalmeyer

Instrumental and choral music was performed by the musicians of the FestspielOrchester Göttingen under the direction of Maestro George Petrou and the singers of the University of Göttingen Chamber Choir (Kammerchor der Universitat Göttingen) directed by chorus master Antonius Adamske.

== Production team ==
- Musical Director: George Petrou
- Director: Laurence Dale
- Stage and costume designer: Giorgina Germanou
- Light designer: John Bishop Light designer
- Choreography: Carmine De Amicis
- Production manager and assistant director: Constantina Psoma
- Stage manager: Anelia Kadieva Jonsson
- Set and costumes assistant designers: Marisa Soulioti, Myrtò Kosmopoulou
- Répétiteurs: Fernando Aguado
- Set realisation: ARTorna Veranstaltungstechnik
- Costume realisation: Daphne Tsakota, Margarita Xanthaki, Alaadin Halawany
- Make-up: Dimitris Garis, Ingo Grygat, Sylke Schmidt, Maika Lenga
- Set technical advisor: Eva Andronikidou
- Orchestral floor manager: Michael Rathmann
- Supertitles: André Sievers
- Performance photography: Alciro Theodoro da Silva

The production was also supported and facilitated by the management, production, technical, workshop and performance support staff of the Deutsches Theater Göttingen.

== Premiere and Festival Performances ==
The premiere took place on May 10, 2024 at the Deutsches Theater in Göttingen and was followed by four more performances on May 11, 15, 19 and 20. The new work was billed as the festival opera, i.e. the main attraction of the 2024 festival season. There was also a family version of the opera presented in the afternoon of May 20, 2024. Half the length of the complete opera, it had many additional entertaining and educational touches without compromising the cultural and social import of the new opera. Anelia Kadieva Jonsson adapted the staging for the family version and the actor and entertainer Juri Tetzlaff contributed the story telling, mystery solving, and loads of interactive fun. Among the several special elements of the family version were a friendly coloratura singing lesson from Myrsini Margariti as Madame de Rochefide and a mini-interview with the soprano extraordinaire Samuel Mariño about the mystery of his gender-defying voice, bullying, and overcoming adversity. The young audience also got a chance to ponder how in the world there could be a new opera by Handel who, after all, has been dead for 265 years, and to decide how the opera should end: in a tragic way of Balzac's story or with a happy ending, or at least the one where no one dies. They kids chose the latter.

The opera was broadcast by NDR Kultur radio as part of the ARD (Association of Public Broadcasters in Germany) Radiofestival 2024 on Saturday, 31 August 2024.

In the spring of 2025, the International Handel Festival made the complete video recording of the opera available on its companion video site, the Haendel Channel, and on its YouTube channel.

== Libretto: Source, Significance and Modifications ==
George Petrou, conductor and artistic director, collected Handel's rejected or reworked opera music for a long time. He initially thought of recording them as an album but eventually came to favor the idea of presenting them on stage, as an opera pastiche or pasticcio, a form that was widely used during the Baroque era, including by Handel himself. In collaboration with the English tenor and opera director Laurence Dale, Sarrasine by Honoré de Balzac was chosen as a literary narrative of the new opera. The pairing of Balzac's novella with Handel's music to create a twenty-first century pastiche was not accidental choice but stemmed for the co-creators' belief that this "work from the Romantic period is a love letter to Baroque opera - and addresses questions that still concern us today".

=== The Plot of Balzac's Novella ===
Novella's story-within-a-story is set in the 1750s and its main character is a star of the Roman opera stage called Zambinella. The stunning soprano is so beautiful that the young French sculptor named Jean-Ernst Sarrasine, who is new to both Rome and Italian opera, declares her to be the embodiment of the very ideal of female beauty. He passionately falls in love with the singer, attends every performance, incessantly draws and sculpts her image, and fantasizes of declaring his love to her. He succeeds in putting himself in the situation where he can confess his love but the singer insists that she needs a friend, a brother, a protector. Soon after, Sarrasine has an opportunity to get into another private party where Zambinella would perform and it is there that the love-struck young sculptor sees his beloved in man's clothes. Confused and unsettled, he demands an explanation and receives a mocking answer that, of course, the star of the Roman stage cannot be a woman. Sarrasine is given to understand that the singer is 'in fact' not a female soprano but a male castrato soprano and, still refusing to fully believe this, the young sculptor nevertheless begins to feel that both his personal and artistic worlds are crashing to the ground. Balzac gives this story-in-the-story a tragic end.

The framing story of the novella takes place in the 1830s Paris, in the lavish mansion of the wealthy and mysterious de Lanty family, where unbeknownst to most gossipy members of Parisian society, Zambinella lives out his last years in near total seclusion in the care of his niece, her husband and their two children. The story of Zambinella is what the male narrator offers up to the attractive Parisian socialite Madame de Rochefide, who is his guest at the party and an object of his desire, when the two of them accidentally encounter the 'ghost' of the de Lanty family.

=== 20th Century Scholarly Interest ===
For over a century after its publication, Sarrasine was relatively little known but, starting in the 1960s, Balzac's novella has garnered considerable interest among the scholars in the fields of literary theory, philosophy, semiotics, as well as history of culture, music, voice, gender and sexuality and, eventually, among general reading public. Thus, the choice of Balzac's novella as a literary basis for a contemporary Baroque opera pastiche is notable not only because it speaks to present-day cultural issues but also because it contributes to over half century of growing intellectual, cultural and social engagement with this work.

=== Plot and Character Modifications in Opera Libretto ===
The structure and narrative of the opera closely cleaves to that of Balzac's novella but the modifications are notable in their interest and significance. One notable staging decision made by the creators of the opera pastiche was to recast the unidentified narrator of the novella as Balzac himself. As Balzac begins to tell the story of Sarrasine and Zambinella to Madame de Rochefide, the opera proceeds as if the two Parisians have travelled back in time and find themselves 'literally' in the company of the young French sculptor, the opera star and all the other participants and witnessed of their fateful story. In the final twist, it is the Cardinal's men but Balzac himself, and perhaps even Madame de Rochefide to some degree, who save Zambinella from Sarrasine's murderous intention and, in the resulting scuffle, kill Sarrasine instead, intentionally or not. While one reviewer, notable for his overall hostility to the project and its literary source, managed to find fault with these staging choices, the known facts about Balzac's Parisian lifestyle and social circle, as well as the significant autobiographical elements of his literary work, make this staging choice not only dramaturgically effective but also coherent and historically grounded. Moreover, Balzac's and Madame de Rochefide's apparent 'presence' and 'participation' in the story of Zambinella, Sarrasine and the Cardinal are easily 'readable' by contemporary audiences who are broadly familiar with fantastic realism and post-modern literary devices. That it is Balzac, rather than the Cardinal's men, who kill Sarrasine in the opera is a particular treat to those in the audience who know the novella and can appreciate that it is indeed the novella's author who, in the very real sense, 'decided' how his title character's story would end. All of this is underscored in the opera co-creators' understanding of both their process and product as "a modern, post-modern production" that deliberately overcomes boundaries, "temporal, spatial and the supposed boundaries between fiction and reality."

Another significant modification of Balzac's story is the opera creators' decision to change the character of Madame de Rochefide from a wealthy society lady to a feted soprano singer. In the novella, the beautiful singer at the party is Marianina, the daughter of the de Lanty family, and at the end it becomes clear that her vocal talent is an inheritance from Zambinella, who is her great uncle. While the 'transfer' of the vocal talent from Marianina to Madame Rochefide results in the loss of this narrative nodule, it creates an interesting new connection in its place. As a soprano herself, the opera's Madame de Rochefide can be interpreted as having a deeper - and thus more terrifying - identification with both the brilliant Zambinella and the death-like old man that she is now. Recast as a singer in the prime of her life - vocally and otherwise - the opera's Madame de Rochefide can be understood to feel even more existential angst as she learns that the ghastly walking corpse that so repulsed her was once an incomparable soprano whose stunning beauty inspired artists to represent her or him as both Venus and Adonis. The opera's Madame de Rochefide can also be more easily interpreted as realizing that, like Zambinella herself, the age of the illustrious castrati and the kind of passion and sublimation that they evoked had irreversibly faded. Thus, the time and disenchantment in the new opera pastiche - about which more is said below - work on two different registers of biological time of individual life and historical time of culture, art and mores.

The 'release' of Marianina from the character imbued with an echo of Zambinella's voice allowed the staging team to intensify the meanings implicit in Balzac's sister-and-brother character pair. Balzac narrated the beauty of both de Lanty children - Marianina and Filippo, female and male - in lengthy and gushing prose characteristic of the period. The opera's creative team fashioned the pair into an explicit personification of gender, desire, and transgression. Dressed in the obvious pink and blue of the contemporary gender binary, the siblings' incestuous closeness - particularly their mutual caresses of and near the gender-indeterminate artistic representations of their grand uncle - invited reflection on the binary, the fluid, the transgressive and the transitional.

In addition to the visual and performative elements of the theater, the overall narrative line of the opera pastiche is carried through by the carefully chosen direct quotations or close paraphrases of Balzac's French-language text. Opera director Laurence Dale limited his selections to the most dramatic and crucial parts of the novella's dialogue and all spoken text of the opera is in French.

== Music ==
The lyrical and musical qualities of the arias, duets and other vocal pieces were important in the process of constructing the pastiche as a unified whole, as both had to 'work' in developing and deepening the ideas, emotions, themes and symbols of the new opera. For those familiar with Balzac's novella, aria and duet lyrics provide novel characterizations of characters and specific narrative moments. All but one choral piece from Handel's English-language oratorio Semele are in Italian.

Most of the opera's musical material consists of arias and duets that Handel composed for his operas but then either completely cut out from the scores prior to their premieres or cut and replaced with significantly modified versions. In either case, these compositions have not been heard either by past or by present audiences, and remain largely unfamiliar even to the opera specialists. In an essay for the festival program, Panja Mücke wrote that "it was not the quality of the music that caused Handel to reject these pieces from his own stage works." There were multiple reasons for revisions, from dramaturgical to practical. Adjustments were especially frequent when opera cast changed: "arias could be transposed, adapted to the vocal range, altered in coloratura or tempo, completely recomposed or discarded altogether."

Overall, the new opera pastiche included 14 pieces that were cut before the premieres. These 'rejected' pieces were originally composed by Handel for 6 of his operas and 1 oratorio. It also presented early versions of 10 pieces that were later replaced with revised versions. These 'alternative' pieces were found in drafts and other versions of 7 operas. Altogether, the new Handel pastiche collected into one work the never-before-performed pieces from 12 works: 11 operas and 1 oratorio.

Originally composed for	Rejected	Number	Alternative	Number
Ottone (1723)	two arias and accompagnato	3	overture and three arias	4
Tamerlano (1724)	two arias, duet and accompagnato	4		
Alessandro (1726)			aria	1
Agrippina (1709)	duet and chorus	2		
Floridante (1721)	aria	1	march	1
Giulio Cesare (1724)	two arias	2		
Alcina (1735)			chorus	1
Admeto (1727)			aria	1
Scipione (1726)			aria	1
Amadigi di Gaula (1715)	aria	1		
Samson (1743)	instrumental (Embassy Symphony)	1		
Atalanta (1736)			aria	1
TOTAL		14		10

A few 'non-rejected' instrumental and vocal pieces by Handel have been used to complete the musical landscape of the new opera pastiche. George Petrou also composed new and recomposed existing Handel's music to achieve specific artistic goals. The most important of these recompositions involves Handel's aria "Lascia la spina, cogli la rosa", a piece that is well known to and loved by the fans of Baroque opera. In Sarrasine, this aria becomes both unsettled and unsettling leitmotif. "Lascia la spina" is a deeply symbolic number sung by the personification of Pleasure in the oratorio Il trionfo del tempo e del disinganno (The Triumph of Time and Disillusion, HWV 46a, later reworked into two other versions with a modified title The Triumph of Time and Truth, HWV 46b and HWV 71). In the oratorio, "Lascia la spina" appears at the moment when, persuaded by Time and Disillusion (or Good Counsel), Beauty bids farewell to Pleasure, choosing chastity and virtue. Present day audiences are more likely to know the melodic line of this aria from its later reuse with different lyrics as "Lascia ch'io pianga" in the opera Rinaldo. Thus, the history of the leitmotif aria is itself one of revision and pastiche but also rejection, erasure, substitution and forgetting. Fittingly, the new opera pastiche itself never presents "Lascia la spina" in its complete or 'true-to-original' form, but instead deconstructs, recomposes, mutes or breaks it off.

Both musical and historical aspects of the chosen leitmotif create additional layers of meaning and interpretation in the new opera. Three possible areas of expanded meanings are readily discerned. First, in connecting Sarrasine to Il Trionfo, the leitmotif invites the audience to consider if the opera's Balzacian characters are struggling with some of the same existential issues as those explored in the oratorio: beauty, pleasure, artifice, aging, virtue and time. Secondly, the leitmotif prompts the audience to recall that, when the 22-year old Handel composed Il Trionfo, he was himself under the patronage of the wealthy and powerful Italians, including the cardinals. In fact, the libretto of Il Trionfo was written by one such Cardinal, Benedetto Pamphili, who had an especially close relationship with the young composer and virtuoso. The reflection on the relationship of La Zambinella and the Cardinal is thus broadened to a more general consideration of art, sexuality and patronage, both past and present. Lastly, the consistently mutilated "Lascia la spina" of the new opera engages the audiences with a variety of issues, including castration, transformation, fashioning of self and other, nonrecognition, misrecognition, interpretation and, of course, pastiche.

== Staging ==
Unlike the novella - which relies on the readers' imagination to visualize characters and settings - the opera had a formidable challenge of creating 'the mystery of Zambinella' - as well as the other characters' reactions and relations with her/him - with and through the voices, bodies, and appearances of specific singers and actors chosen to create these roles. A number of staging, costume and makeup elements deepened the exploration of the issues central to both Balzac's novella and the new opera, including those of beauty, voice, art, illusion, love, gender, sexuality, time, aging, and death.

The central element of Balzac's novella is the nude Venus sculpture, in which Sarrasine fatefully attempted to capture what he believed to be Zambinella's ideal female beauty. The opera's creative team placed the main symbol of Balzac's novella mostly with its back to the audience, precluding easy gender identification. The sculpture's centrality to the theme of gender and ambiguity was further highlighted via the interactions of the more explicitly twin-gendered characters of the Delanty children.

The painting of Zambinella as Adonis, which in the novella is commissioned by the de Lanty family and modelled on Sarrasine's sculpture after the young artist's death, is changed in the opera staging to a large portrait of Samuel Mariño who created the role of Zambinella. This choice was undoubtedly meant to help the audience connect the 'ghost' of the de Lanty family with the beautiful star of the Roman stage. The mystery is heightened by the portrait being covered up until the moment when Madame de Rochefide begins to learn the series of secrets hiding beneath the repulsive visage of the shriveled old man. As in the novella, in the opera Madame de Rochefide exclaims at this point: "C'est qui dans ce portrait ? Il est bien trop beau qu'il soit un homme!" ("Who is in this portrait? He is much too beautiful to be a man.")

All of the operatic resources - voice, singing, speaking, music, face, visage, glance, body, movement, acting, choreography, costumes, makeup, lighting and stage settings - were summoned to preclude the simplistic reception of the new opera whereby the audience could simply say at the end that Zambinella was, "in fact", "not a woman." The opera's reception suggests that the cast, co-creators, the creative team and Handel rose up to the challenge.

== Reception ==
It was well received by audiences and critics.

The NDR Kultur reported "bravo calls and standing ovations", interviewed audience members after the premiere and declared that "this experiment has been successful" in most every way. The review article in ForumOpera: Magazin du Monde Lyrique reported that, by the second act, the premiere audience got over the initial shock, going absolutely wild as the cast took their bows, "a just reward for an intelligent and refined show."

The review in OperaWire gave enthusiastic endorsement to the idea of creating a new opera pastiche of Handel's music, saying that "for a festival dedicated to the composer that sets out to explore his creative talents, it is an enterprise that can only be applauded." It also highly praised the combination of Handel and Balzac, saying that "many narratives could have been chosen as a means for presenting these arias; however, the choice of Balzac's 'Sarrasine' was inspired, for it allowed the audience to be directly confronted by the central and ambiguous role played by the castrato in 18th century baroque opera, as well as the status they were able to achieve in society." ForumOpera critic wrote that "the choice to adapt Balzac's text proved to be the most fortunate intuition" and declared the premiere to be a "dazzling cocktail of knowledge, intelligence and talent." He also praised the "artistic coherence of the programming" that presented the new opera pastiche alongside Handel's "Il Trionfo del Tempo e del Disinganno", from which the new work took its leitmotif and to which it connected in a variety of ways, not least by way of the connection between the Cardinal of Balzac's novella and the real Italian cardinals who patronized the young Handel.

George Petrou received praise for the feat of assembling so much rare material, from which the music appropriate to every narrative twist of Balzac's complex novella could be selected. Such an endeavor, it was clear, would be impossible without an "encyclopedic knowledge of the composer's works that inspired him to compose this pasticcio, while eliminating the most obvious 'hits' or limiting their presence as much as possible." On the flipside, one critic noted that the relative scarcity of recitatives precluded "the usual balance one would normally expect from an opera by Händel" and produced the impression that "the inclusion of as much rejected and alternative musical material as possible took precedence over dramatic or formal considerations."

The critics remarked on the new music that George Petrou interspersed throughout the pastiche, particularly impressed with the eerie and mysterious foundation it created at the opening of the first act that seemed "inspired by The Vampire Diaries" with "dramatic accent, sliding strings, explosive chords, various rustlings, while on the stage as if plunged into mist – superb lighting, refined through-and-through, by John Bishop – a character who evokes Michael Jackson advances like an automaton in front of motionless characters that we guess more than we see." The quality of the orchestral performance and of mutual admiration of musicians and artistic director were noted as well. Reviewers highlighted the ingenious use of “Lascia la spina” from “Il Trionfo del tempo e del Disinganno” to bind the work together and to cross-reference it once more with Handel the composer and Handel the person, as well as creative use of “Concerto grosso op. 6 Nr. 8” and Sarabande that some might remember from Stanley Kubrick's "Barry Lyndon." The overall project was praised being both "a dramatically strong work" and "a well-constructed vehicle for bringing Händel's rejected music to the stage."

The French-language review by Maurice Selles in ForumOpera gave very positive assessment to the work of the opera and stage director Laurence Dale: "Not only has the eminent tenor turned director, qualified as a French speaker, produced a "classic" adaptation by eliminating, simplifying, and modifying as little as possible, but in the end the show he offers, beyond the elegance that characterizes his proposals, seems to reveal a certain familiarity with the writer's universe."

lan Neilson, writing in OperaWire, gave high marks to Dale and the entire staging, costume, makeup and light team for ensuring that, true to novella's structure, the opera maintained Zambinella as it "focal point" throughout:

"[A]lmost every time he set foot on stage, the other characters immediately faded into the background. Not only was he given the most flamboyant arias to sing, but he was also costumed in the most ostentatious and colorful dresses and positioned centrally on the stage, with the other characters and the scenery often acting as a framing device. Particularly successful was his use of the side boxes to seat the cardinal and his retinue on one side and the ladies on the other side of the stage, so that they became part of the audience, allowing Zambinella to have the stage to himself and the audience's full attention."

Alan Neilson also gave high marks to Giorgina Germanou's sets that, "although simple, were colorful and functional and successfully distinguished between the 18th and 19th century scenes." Ultimately, though, it was her costume designs, "which she fashioned to reflect the protagonists’ social positions, roles and characters, that really impressed." Maurice Selles also was highly complimentary of costumes for being a big part of realizing the "fantasy" on stage, as well as the stage sets and the use of the venue itself to a powerful effect.

Noting that although, as one critic put it, "Sarrasine may be the title of the opera, it is Zambinella around which the drama rotates", the reviewers focused a good deal of attention on Samuel Mariño and the character he created, giving consistent praise for every aspect, from appearance and acting to voice and technique. Writing for OperaWire, Alan Neilson noted that "his petite stature and smooth, refined facial features were perfectly suited to playing a young woman in flamboyant, 18th century dresses". The singer "appeared very comfortable, especially when positioned center stage, performing directly for the audience" and treated his virtuousic arias "with a carefree theatricality and was not averse to taking risks in order to show off his flashy, dazzling ornamentations, trills and coloratura." In a his very erudite article, Maurice Selles wrote that "the appearance of Samuel Mariño created the sensation because the illusion was perfect: ... the delicacy of his physique, the perfection of makeup and the constant control of his mannerisms" produced before the public's eyes "the character radiating the seduction described in the narrative." Characterizing Mariño's voice as "a melodious balm", Selles noted that "the stylistic figures such as the trill are executed with a regularity and endurance that seems to aim for the feat". The praise lavished on Mariño's singing, he noted, should not obscure that "the actor is remarkable in the spoken exchanges." His highest praise of Mariño's performance came in the form of a strong conviction that "the creation of this character will for a long time be linked to this performer.

The tenor Juan Sancho, who created the title role, was praised by Selles for "a versatility of a great actor" that allowed him to express "with all the nuances of tenderness, passion, jealousy, despair, fury, a voice always well projected and a performance of an intensity without excess that is truly moving." Neilson found Sancho's portrayal of Sarrasive too aggressive, but, on the whole, thought it "nevertheless a strong performance from Sancho, one that was mirrored by his fine singing, which was forceful, passionate and expressive," with special praise for the final scene where "the rejected aria from Floridante, “Amor ed impietá,” and a melodramme based on a rejected accompagnato from Tamerlano, was expertly rendered to capture the emotional maelstrom into which he had fallen"

Myrsini Margariti who created the role of Madame de Rochefide reimagined as a renowned opera singer, received well-deserved praise for a demanding performance. The ForumOpera review noted her "supple, full and agile voice, enough to do justice to two duets, a quartet, four arias and an arioso, interpreted with ease, sensitivity and verve, as the case may be" and for meeting with grace the test of being present on stage with scarcely any breaks as both participant and witness to the entire story. The OperaWire critic especially noted her aria “Tomi la goia in sen” aria, written for but excluded from Amadigi di Gaula that "allowed her to show off her splendid coloratura, detailed ornamentation and seductive upper register to good effect"

Alan Neilson has arguably misunderstood the performance of Sreten Manojlović who created the role of Balzac, the opera's recasting of the novella's anonymous first-person narrator. At first seemingly cognizant of bass-baritone's consistent intenship to portray "a fairly laidback Balzac, who was emotionally distant from the action, more content to watch on in a detached, knowing manner," the critic later finds fault with the fact that Balzac's "murder of Sarrasine was carried out in slow motion, which further highlighted his emotional detachment." Apropos his singing, Neilson says that "although clear, careful and articulate, [it] was at times dramatically flat" and that overall there was "little passion in his presentation" and few "risks to develop Händel's arias." This analysis seems illogical in its misunderstanding that a conscious and entirely justified portrayal of detachment in this role is incompatible with very 'passionate' or 'dramatic' singing. In contrast, the French-language review by Maurice Selles noted that Manojlović's voice is "well-toned, well-projected, and his stage presence is remarkable, because in addition to the exchanges spoken in French, the production sometimes places him as an observer, and he copes well with these thankless moments where we are present with nothing else to do but listen and watch what is happening. Slim and quite tall, he cuts a good figure as a young man anxious to push his good fortune forward."

Selles thought that "all the performers on the stage ... are impeccable, [including] members of the chamber choir of the University of Goettingen." Neilson wrote that "Florian Eppinger made for an authoritative and aggressive Cardinal de Lanty, not averse to dispensing physical violence, Ronny Thalmeyer was a suitably irritating Viennese fop, who enjoyed tormenting Sarrasine for believing Zambinella was a woman [and] Marina Lara Poltmann produced a vivacious and amusing Mademoiselle de Lanty."

One rather undetailed review stood out in its unrelenting hostility toward every aspect of the new opera and a seeming disdain for its literary source. The repeated assertion that the new opera is nothing more than a "gender-fluidity party 'round one male soprano" was quite telling as to the real reason behind the negative assessment. In contrast, most reviewers found much value in the new opera's engagement with the issues of gender, desire and art. OperaWire critic noted that "with identity dominating political and cultural discourse, the subtext of gender ambiguity could hardly be more relevant." It wasn't lost on most critics or, for that matter, the audience, that the kinds of cruelties and indignities that someone like Zambinella experienced in their times have not fully disappeared in our own and that, alongside the new spaces of freedom, there are multiple layers of rejection, erasure, insecurity and discrimination. The cast, creative team and the festival as a whole succeeded in making sure that the painful themes explored in the opera did not 'read' as historical curiosities or abstract cultural issues. Although the ForumOpera critic marveled at the "ease" with Samuel Mariño "publicly assumes his share of femininity and claims his non-binaryness", most reviews noted that this apparent ease - and the overall focus on gender fluidity - should not obscure the reality of bullying, discrimination and other expressions of hostility and violence. Given the shocking developments in the politics of gender and liberal democratic freedoms more broadly that unfolded within several months of the new opera's premiere, the new opera pastiche can be rightly judged as more urgent and significant than initially perceived.

All in all, the new opera achieved its goal of 'making the case for love'. No less importantly, it succeeded in persuading thoughtful critics and, it might be assumed, the appreciative audiences, to judge it on its own terms. As Alan Neilson put it in his review, rather than getting "distracted by how far 'Sarrasine' matches up to other operas of the baroque period, it is more satisfying if viewed as a contemporary work, even if it does rest firmly upon Händel's music." Maurice Selles who reviewed Sarrasine for ForumOpera went even further: "It was an absolute creation, a world first. Will it be without a future? That would be to despair of the taste of our contemporaries."
