= Manzotti =

Manzotti is an Italian surname. Notable people with the surname include:

- Achille Manzotti (1943–2007), Italian television and film producer
- Angelo Manzotti (born 1971), Italian opera singer
- Luigi Manzotti (1835–1905), Italian mime dancer and choreographer
- Mabel Manzotti (1938–2012), Argentine actress
