= Silla (Graun) =

Silla is an Italian-language opera in three acts by Carl Heinrich Graun. The opera was composed on a French-language libretto written by the Prussian king Frederick II (1712-1786) reworked into Italian by poet and librettist Giovanni Pietro Tagliazucchi (1716-1768). Centered on the figure of the Roman general, statesman and dictator Sulla, it was one of the three libretti by Frederick II drafted between 1749 and 1754 and focused on political and military leaders, with the other two being Coriolanus, Roman general, and Montezuma, emperor of Mexico. The opera is scored for 7 vocal soloists, mixed chorus, and orchestra consisting of 2 horns, 2 flutes, 2 oboes, 2 bassoons, strings, and basso continuo. The premiere took place at the Hofoper unter den Linden, Berlin, on 27 March 1753.

== Contemporary Performance and Recording ==
The modern revival of Graun's Silla was presented at the 2022 season of the Innsbruck Festival of Early Music under the baton of conductor and festival director Alessandro De Marchi. The artistic and stage director of the production was Georg Quander and the set designs and costumes were created by Julia Dietrich. The premiere took place at the Tyrolean State Theatre in Innsbruck, Austria on August 5th and was followed by two more performances on August 7th and 9th. The production was noted as a long-awaited and notable historical rediscovery. It was recorded and released as a three-disk album on the CPO label and is now also available for digital downloading and streaming through all major music services and platforms.

== Roles and performers ==
Roles, voice types, premiere cast
Roles in the order of appearance	Voice type of the 2022 revival production and recording	Performers of the 2022 revival production and recording
Ottavia (Roman noblewoman and betrothed of Postumio)	soprano	Eleonora Bellocci
Fulvia (Roman noblewoman and Ottavia's mother)	soprano	Roberta Invernizzi
Postumio (Roman senator and republican)	male soprano	Samuel Mariño
Lentulo (Roman senator)	countertenor	Hagen Matzeit
Metello (Roman senator)	countertenor	Valer Sabadus
Silla (Roman dictator)	countertenor	Bejun Mehta
Crisogono (freedman)	tenor	Mert Süngü
Roman senators, army veterans who are Silla's followers, plebeians	chorus	Coro Maghini, Claudio Chiavazza, chorus master
