= Robert Crowe (singer) =

American opera singer

- Born: Escondido, California
- Occupation: Operatic sopranist
- Website: www.robertcrowe.com

Robert William Crowe is an American operatic sopranist (male soprano) and musicologist.

== Life and career ==
Crowe was born in Escondido, California. He graduated magna cum laude from Millsaps College in 1992 and received his master's degree from Boston University College of Fine Arts in 1994, followed by a Professional Studies Certificate from the Manhattan School of Music in 1995.

He made his debut as sopranist in 1992. In 1995 he sang the role of Cherubino in Mozart's Le nozze di Figaro at Des Moines Metro Opera. He was the National Winner of the Metropolitan Opera Competition in 1995. In 2017 he received his PhD in Historical Musicology from Boston University.

His repertoire extends from Renaissance to contemporary music, but he focuses on the Italian baroque opera of the 18th and early 19th century.

His recordings between the mid 1990s and 2017 are of importance for the rediscovery of the vocal music from the early Baroque to the Classical period.

== Awards ==
- 1995 National Winner Metropolitan Opera National Council Auditions
- 1995 2nd Prize National Opera Competition
- 1995 Manhattan School of Music Most Promising Career in Opera
- 1995 Richard F. Gold Career Development Award
- 1998 Sullivan Foundation Grant
