= Francesca Franci =

Italian operatic mezzo-soprano

Francesca Franci (born 1962) is an Italian operatic mezzo-soprano.

A native of Rome, Franci is the granddaughter of baritone Benvenuto Franci and the daughter of conductor Carlo Franci. She studied under Rodolfo Celletti and Tito Gobbi, and debuted in Verona, at the Teatro Filarmonico, in 1985, singing the Lieder eines fahrenden Gesellen by Gustav Mahler. She has sung extensively in Italy, including at the Teatro Comunale in Genoa; the Teatro Petruzzelli, in Bari; the Teatro Comunale in Bologna, at which she was a regular performer; the Teatro dell'Opera di Roma; the Teatro San Carlo; the Teatro Comunale in Florence; and La Scala. In 1988 she appeared in Gaetano Donizetti's Maria di Rohan at the Festival of the Valle d'Itria. Internationally, she has appeared at the New Israeli Opera, the Paris Opera, and in Wiesbaden, and in concert with the Concertgebouw in Amsterdam. Roles which she has sung include Maddalena, in Giuseppe Verdi's Rigoletto; Rosina, in Gioachino Rossini's Il barbiere di Siviglia; and Suzuki, in Giacomo Puccini's Madama Butterfly.
