= Il crociato in Egitto =

Opera in two acts by Giacomo Meyerbeer

- Opera by Giacomo Meyerbeer
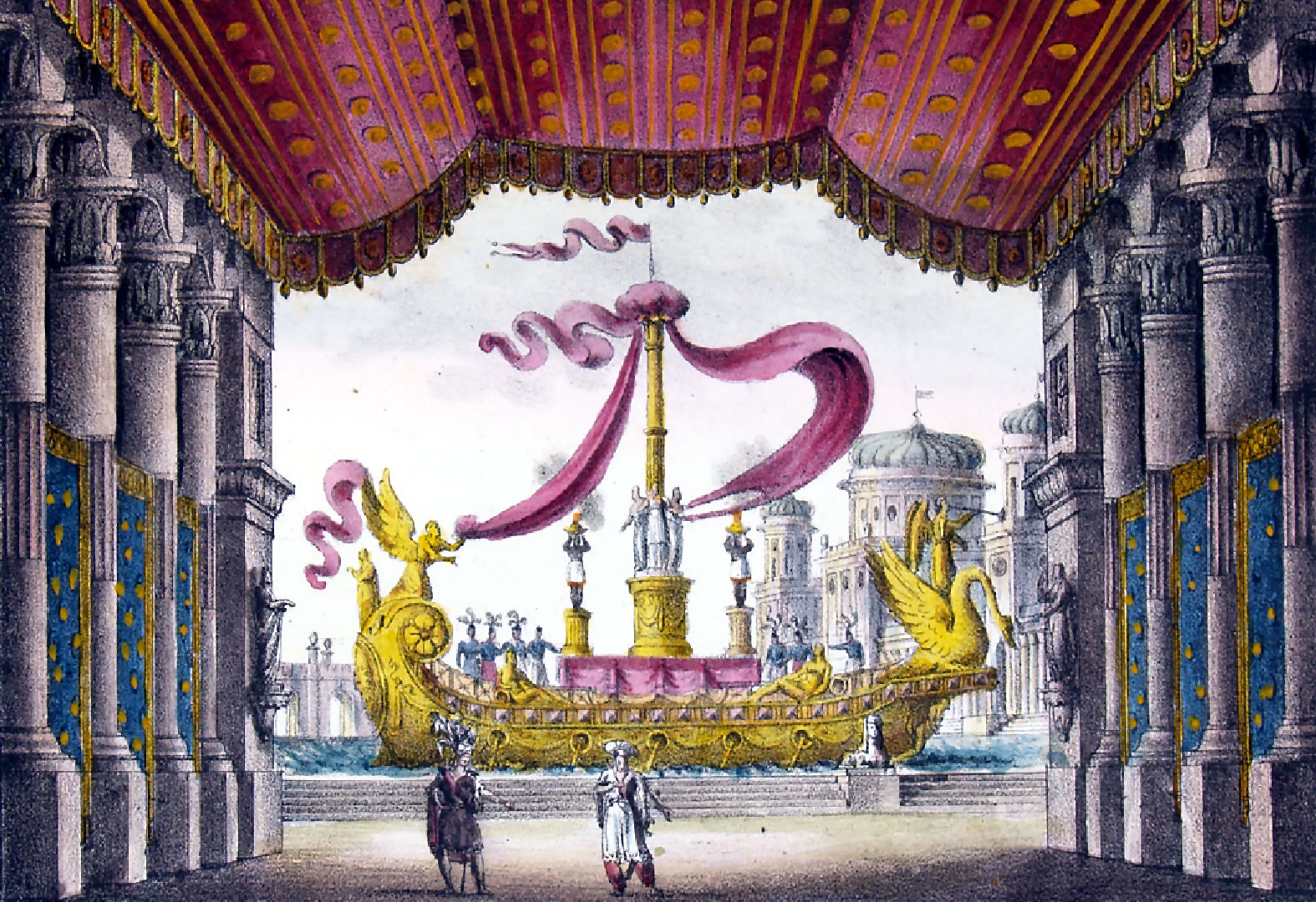
- Set design for act 1, scene 3, La Scala, Milan (1826) by Alessandro Sanquirico
- Translation: The Crusader in Egypt
- Librettist: Gaetano Rossi
- Language: Italian
- Premiere: 7 March 1824; La Fenice, Venice

Il crociato in Egitto (The Crusader in Egypt) is an opera in two acts by Giacomo Meyerbeer, with a libretto by Gaetano Rossi. It was first performed at La Fenice theatre, Venice on 7 March 1824. The part of Armando was sung by the famous castrato, Giovanni Battista Velluti; the opera was probably the last to feature a leading role written for a castrato. It is the last of Meyerbeer's series of operas in Italian, and became the foundation of the composer's international success.

== Performance history ==
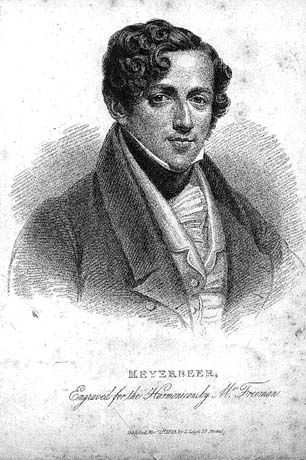
Giacomo Meyerbeer, c. 1825

After its successful Venetian premiere, Il Crociato was staged at the Teatro della Pergola in Florence (7 May 1824), Trieste (winter 1824–1825), Padua (summer 1825), and at His Majesty's Theatre in London (3 June 1825, the first of Meyerbeer's operas to be performed in England, also with Velluti in the cast). This encouraged Rossini, who was then managing the Théâtre-Italien, to arrange for its performance in Paris (25 September 1825), where the role of Armando was taken by the soprano Giuditta Pasta and Aladino by Nicolas Levasseur. For each of these productions Meyerbeer revised the work and composed new music for parts of it. Over the next twenty to thirty years the opera was performed in almost every major opera house in Europe, and even in Mexico City, Havana and Constantinople.

The opera formed the basis for the composer's future great success. As remarked by the critic of the London magazine, The Harmonicon, in a review of the 1825 production in Trieste:

Of all living composers, Meyerbeer is the one who most happily combines the easy, flowing and expressive melodies of Italy with the severer beauties, the grander accomplishments, of the German school.

This formula of combining the strengths of both operatic schools, as well as of dramatic stage spectacle and flexible and imaginative use of the orchestra, whilst fully displayed in Il crociato in Egitto, was to produce maximum effect with Meyerbeer's series of Grand Operas, commencing with Robert le diable in 1831.

While it has not been staged complete in the 20th century there have been concert performances in both London and New York City which were recorded on LP. A staged revival was held in Venice in 2007 featuring a natural male soprano Michael Maniaci.

== Significant innovations ==
After Rossini left for Paris, composers then active in Italy began to take important steps away from Rossini's style in a series of operas which bridged the gap between Rossini and the later bel canto style, which was marked by less florid singing and more emphasis on the dramatic side. One of the earliest of these operas is Meyerbeer's Il crociato in Egitto. It has much in common with Rossini, but, on closer examination, some significant innovations become apparent. One is the even greater complexity of the finale to the first act, especially the use of two contrasting stage bands, which is a precursor of the three bands in L'étoile du nord. This was a direction opposite to that eventually taken by Bellini and Donizetti, who concentrated more on the lyrical lines of singers than on orchestral handling and larger-scale dramatic form; it marks the experience of Meyerbeer's German training and his association with early German romantic opera, including the work of Carl Maria von Weber. In Adriano's "Suono funereo" there is what may well be one of the earliest cases of that strain of lyrical pathos which was to be such a dominant factor in later bel canto works. Another example is Palmide's big aria in act 2: "D'una madre sventurata" in which the desperation of the young mother comes through in the music.

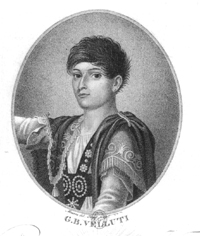
Giovanni Battista Velluti

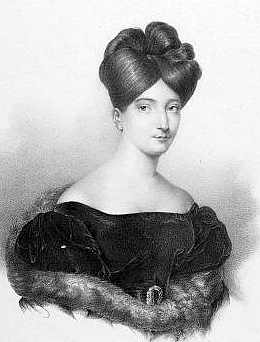
Henriette Méric-Lalande

== Roles ==
Roles, voice types, and premiere cast
Role	Voice type	Premiere cast, 7 March 1824 Conductor: Antonio Cammera
Aladino, Sultan of Damietta	bass	Luciano Bianchi
Palmide, his daughter, secretly married to	soprano	Henriette Méric-Lalande
Armando, a Knight of Rhodes, in the guise of Elmireno	soprano castrato	Giovanni Battista Velluti
Felicia, his betrothed, in disguise as a Knight of Rhodes	contralto	Brigida Lorenzani
Adriano, Grand Master of the Knights of Rhodes	tenor	Gaetano Crivelli
Alma, Palmide’s confidante	soprano	Marietta Bramati
Osmino, Grand Vizier of Damietta	tenor	Giovanni Boccaccio
Mirva, Palmide's son	silent role	
Chorus: Christian slaves and knights, Egyptians, imams and emirs

== Synopsis ==
Place: Damietta
Time: During the Sixth Crusade, which commenced in 1228.

Before the opera begins, Armando, missing presumed dead in fighting, has become confidante to the Sultan Aladino, under an assumed name. He has fallen in love with Aladino's daughter, who has borne him a son, and has secretly converted her to Christianity.

Adriano arrives at the Sultan's palace to negotiate a truce. There he recognises Armando, as does Felicia, who has disguised herself as a knight to find her betrothed. Armando and the other Christian prisoners are thereupon sentenced to imprisonment and death. The ambitious Osmino arms the prisoners under Armando with the intention of killing the Sultan, but Armando exposes his treachery to the Sultan and instead kills Osmino. The Sultan relents, peace is agreed with the Knights and Armando and Palmide are reunited.

== Recordings ==
- Il crociato in Egitto: Royal Philharmonic Orchestra, cond. David Parry. 4 CDs. Opera Rara ORC 10 (1992). Soloists include Yvonne Kenny (Palmide), Bruce Ford (Adriano), Diana Montague (Armando) and Della Jones (Felicia).
- Il crociato in Egitto (Michael Maniaci, Patrizia Ciofi, Marco Vinco, Laura Polverelli, Fernando Portari, Iorio Zennaro, Silvia Pasini, Luca Favaron, Emanuele Pedrini; Orchestra and Chorus of Teatro La Fenice; Conductor: Emmanuel Villaume) Live performance DVD from Teatro La Fenice, January 2007. Dynamic DV 33549 DVD
