= Bruno de Sá =

Brazilian classical sopranist

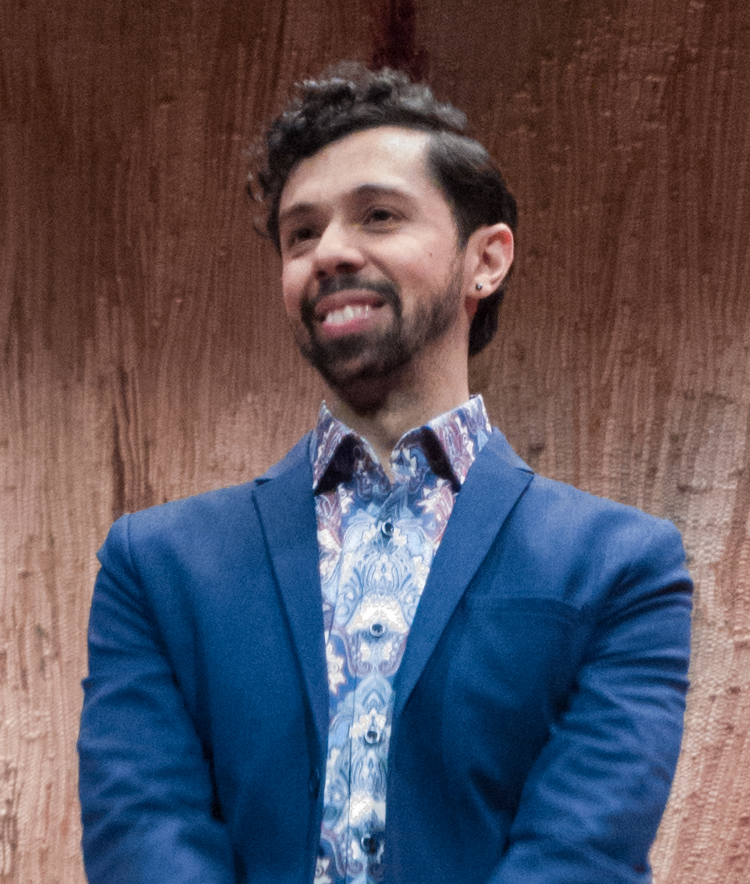
Image of Bruno de Sa

Bruno de Sá is a classical sopranist from Brazil. In 2016, he performed at the São Pedro Theatre in Gianni Schicchi, The Magic Flute, and The Marriage of Figaro. In 2019–2020 he performed as Sesto in Giulio Cesare at the Halle Opera. In 2025 he appeared as Don Elviro in Don Giovanni at the Comic Opera, Berlin, and performed the fifth Bachiana Brasileira, by Heitor Villa-Lobos, in the annual Concert of Paris on July 14th, with the National Orchestra of France.
