= Maayan Licht =

Israeli sopranist (born 1993)

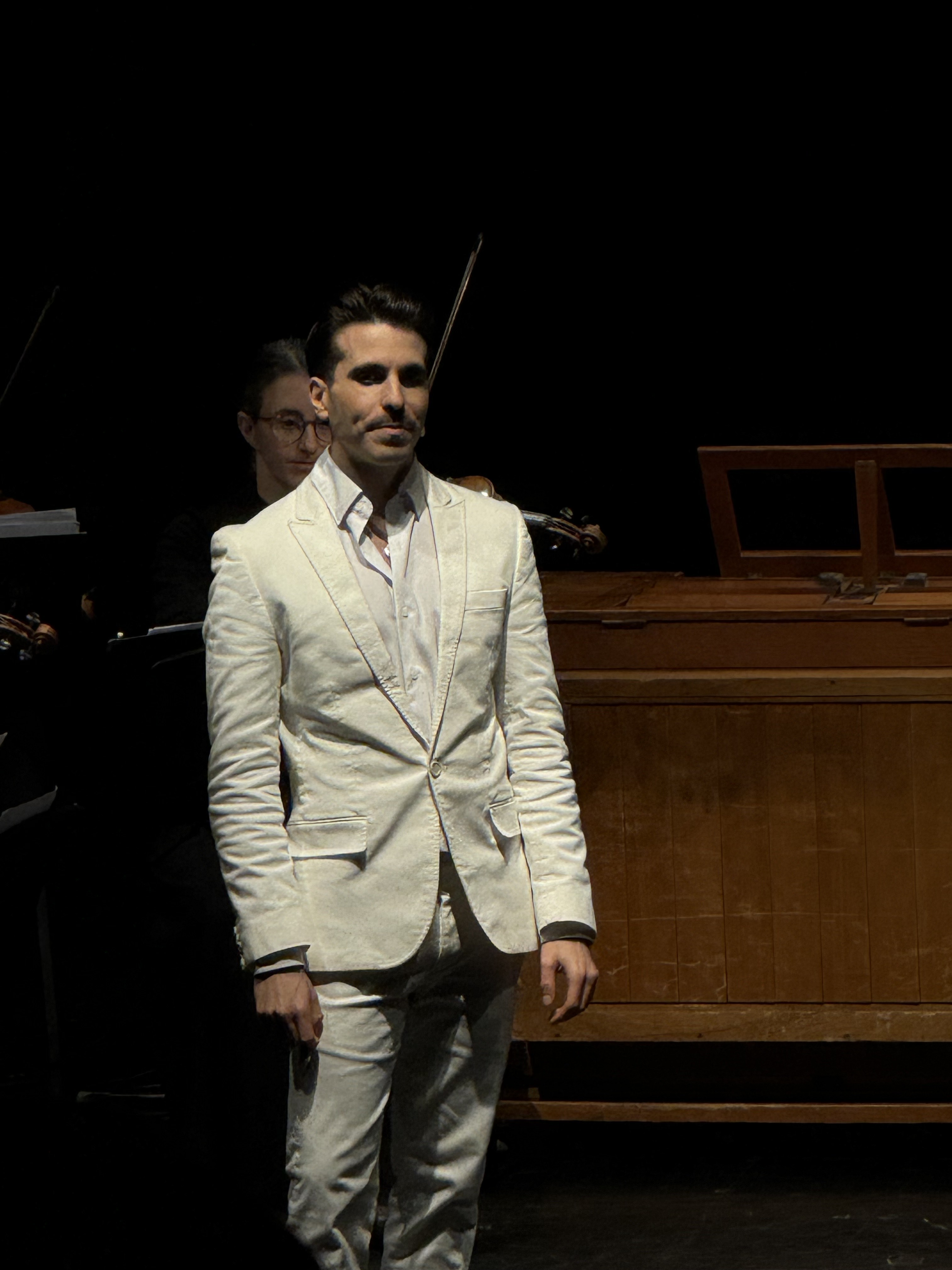
- Maayan Licht in solo concert in Michael Sela auditorium in Rehovot

Background information
- Born: 20 May 1993 (age 33); Israel
- Genre: Baroque opera • Classical music • Early music • contemporary opera
- Occupation: Sopranist
- Instrument: Vocals (soprano)
- Years active: 2021–present
- Website: www.maayanlicht.com

Maayan Licht (Hebrew: מעײן ליכט, born 20 May 1993) is an Israeli classical singer and sopranist. He performs in opera and concert repertoires in Europe and Israel, with a focus on Baroque and early Classical works.

== Early life and education ==
Licht was born in Israel in Rehovot, near Tel Aviv, Israel.

He expressed interests in making sounds starting at age 2, mimicking his family's microwave. He started singing and also whistling very young, developing both skills quickly due to being hard on himself and also enjoying making sounds. His vocal talent in the high soprano register was identified by a local voice teacher, Vita Gurevich, with whom he began his formal studies. He later studied Early Music and classical singing at the Conservatorium van Amsterdam with singing professor Xenia Meijer, completing bachelor's and master's degrees, both awarded cum laude in 2021.

During his studies he performed as a soloist in oratorio repertoire, including Handel's Messiah and Bach's Mass in B minor in Amsterdam. These engagements led to appearances with Dutch early‑music ensembles and opera projects.

He currently resides in both The Hague, Netherlands, and Tel Aviv, Israel. He is gay and supports both Israelis and Palestinians, wanting peace in the war between the two countries.

== Career ==
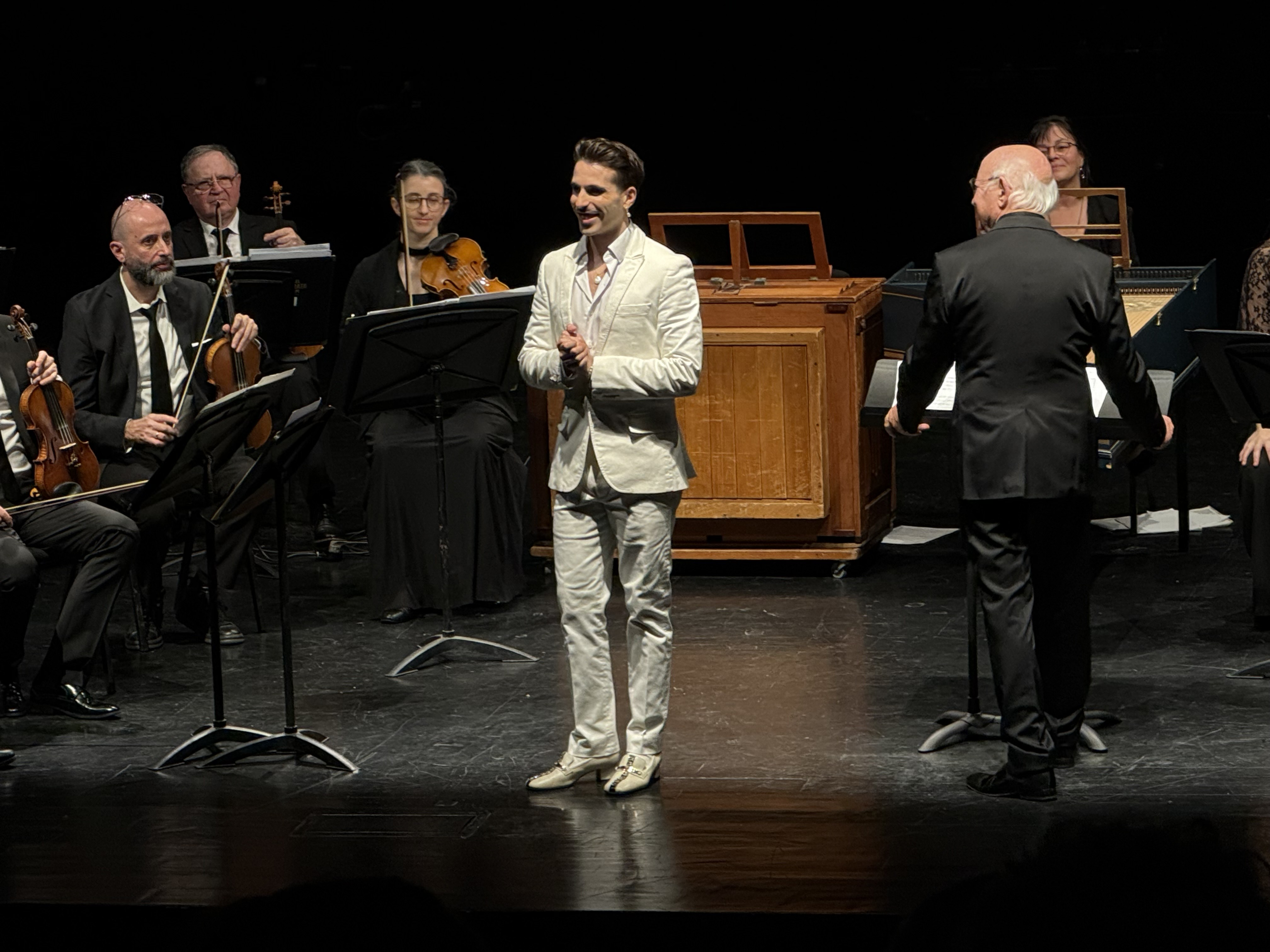
Maayan Licht in solo concert in Michael Sela auditorium in Rehovot

Licht's career centres on Baroque opera and sacred music, alongside Classical and early Classical roles. He has appeared at venues including the Concertgebouw, Amsterdam, Theater an der Wien, the Janáček Theatre in Brno and opera houses in Germany, Austria, the Netherlands and the Czech Republic. In 2026 Licht made his Australian debut with a four-city tour for Vladimir Fanshil's and Eleanor Lyons' series "Live at Yours".

His stage roles have included Laertes in Gasparini's Amleto at Theater an der Wien, Achille in Porpora's Ifigenia in Aulide at the Bayreuth Baroque Opera Festival and Cherubino in Mozart's Le nozze di Figaro at Oper Dortmund and the Janáček Theatre. He has also appeared in Stradella's San Giovanni Battista and in the premiere of Ľubica Čekovská's opera Here I Am, Orlando in Brno.

In concert, Licht has sung soprano parts in Handel's Messiah, Handel's Theodora, Bach's Mass in B minor and his St John Passion. He has collaborated with ensembles such as the Netherlands Bach Society and Opera2Day, among other orchestras and early‑music groups.

== Selected performances ==
| Date | Role | Name of concert / production | Venue | Location (city, country) |
|---|---|---|---|---|
| 2020 | Soprano / ensemble | Grachtenfestival Competition with Duo Zeffiretti | Grachtenfestival venues | Amsterdam, Netherlands |
| 2021–2025 | Soprano soloist | Messiah (Handel), concert performance | Concertgebouw (small hall) | Amsterdam, Netherlands |
| 2021–2025 | Soprano soloist | Mass in B minor (Bach) | Concertgebouw (small hall) | Amsterdam, Netherlands |
| 2023–2025 | Soprano soloist (Didymus) | Theodora (Handel), concert / semi-staged | Muziekgebouw aan 't IJ | Amsterdam, Netherlands |
| 2024 | Achille | Ifigenia in Aulide (Nicola Porpora), Bayreuth Baroque Opera Festival | Markgräfliches Opernhaus | Bayreuth, Germany |
| 2024 | Sopranista soloist | Baroque gala (incl. "Ombra mai fu") with Sexteto IBF | Auditorio Alfredo Kraus | Las Palmas de Gran Canaria, Spain |
| 2024 | Sopranista soloist | Baroque gala (Handel and Vivaldi arias) with Sexteto IBF | Auditorio Alfredo Kraus | Las Palmas de Gran Canaria, Spain |
| 2024–2025 | Soprano role | San Giovanni Battista (Alessandro Stradella), Bayreuth Baroque Opera Festival | Markgräfliches Opernhaus | Bayreuth, Germany |
| 2024–2025 | Featured singer | CarMEN (adaptation of Bizet's Carmen) | Concertgebouw | Amsterdam, Netherlands |
| 2024 –2025 | Featured singer | CarMEN (adaptation of Bizet's Carmen) | Muziekgebouw aan 't IJ | Amsterdam, Netherlands |
| 2024–2025 | Featured singer | CarMEN (adaptation of Bizet's Carmen) | Parade Festival venues | Netherlands |
| 2024–2025 | Featured singer | Technopera (techno–opera project) | Concertgebouw | Amsterdam, Netherlands |
| 2025 | Laertes | Ambleto (Francesco Gasparini) | Theater an der Wien | Vienna, Austria |
| 2025 | Orlando | Here I Am, Orlando (Ľubica Čekovská), world premiere | Janáček Theatre (NdB) | Brno, Czech Republic |
| Oct–Dec 2025 | Cherubino | Le nozze di Figaro (Mozart) | Janáček Theatre (NdB) | Brno, Czech Republic |
| Dec 2025 | Sopranista soloist | "Soprano senza maschera" – Israel Camerata Jerusalem tour | Michael Sela Auditorium | Weizmann Institute of Science, Rehovot, Israel |
| Dec 2025 | Sopranista soloist | "Soprano senza maschera" – Israel Camerata Jerusalem tour | Recanati Auditorium | Tel Aviv Museum of Art, Tel Aviv, Israel |
| Dec 2025 | Sopranista soloist | "Soprano senza maschera" – Israel Camerata Jerusalem tour | Jerusalem International YMCA | Jerusalem, Israel |
| Dec 2025 | Sopranista soloist | "Soprano senza maschera" – Israel Camerata Jerusalem tour | Elma Arts Complex | Zikhron Ya'akov, Israel |
| Sep 2025–Jan 2026 | Cherubino | Le nozze di Figaro (Mozart) | Oper Dortmund | Dortmund, Germany |

== Projects and collaborations ==
Licht participates in staged and crossover projects that combine opera with other performance forms. He has performed in CarMEN, a queer‑themed adaptation of Bizet's Carmen created with drag performers and presented at venues including the Concertgebouw, Muziekgebouw and Dutch festivals. He is also involved in Technopera, a project that integrates electronic music and operatic singing and has appeared at Dutch concert halls and festivals.

== Awards and recognition ==
Licht has received several international prizes and distinctions for his singing.

- Winner of the "Best Newcomer" award at the Oper! Awards 2025.
- Recipient of the Bajazzo Sponsor Award 2025 from Theater- und Konzertfreunde Dortmund for his performance as Cherubino in Le nozze di Figaro at Oper Dortmund.
- Grand Prize at the Vienna International Music Competition in 2023.
- Jury and audience prizes at the Grachtenfestival Competition 2020 with his ensemble Duo Zeffiretti.
