= Radu Marian (sopranist) =

Moldovan singer (born 1977)

- Born: 1977 (age 48–49); Moldavian Soviet Socialist Republic
- Occupation: Singer (sopranist)
- Years active: 1989–present

Radu Marian (Romanian pronunciation: [ˈradu mariˈan]; born 1977) is a Moldovan male soprano (sopranist).

He possesses a pure soprano voice in the range of C4 to C6, and he is considered an important singer in Baroque music. His repertoire incorporates cantatas written for soprano by composers like Händel, Bononcini, Carissimi, and Frescobaldi, and the repertoire of the old castrati. He has been called "the Baroque nightingale" by the Italian newspaper Corriere della Sera.

Marian is an "endocrinological castrato" or "natural castrato". A natural castrato is a male singer who never went through puberty and is able to keep his "unbroken" voice intact without castration.

== Life and career ==
Marian was born in 1977, in what was then the Moldavian Soviet Socialist Republic, to a family of artists. His talent was first recognized publicly in 1989, at the International Festival of Creation in Moscow, where he took the Laureate prize.

In 1990, at the age of 13, he was awarded first prize at the Extraordinary Talents International Festival in Chișinău. Afterwards, his concert career flourished, and he also continued his singing and piano studies in Moscow and in Bucharest.

He moved to Italy in 1999. In Rome, he studied with conductor and composer Flavio Colusso, with whom he has performed the unabridged operas of Giacomo Carissimi across Europe. In 2000 he recorded his first album, Alia Vox.

Marian is a regular guest at some of the most prestigious European music festivals. He has performed at the Festival dei Due Mondi in Spoleto, the Avignon Festival, and the Vilnius Festival. He has also performed at the Musikverein and Konzerthaus in Vienna, the Concertgebouw in Amsterdam, the Maestranz Theatre in Seville, the Oratorio del Gonfalone in Rome, the Hermitage Theatre in Saint Petersburg, and the Galina Vishnevskaya Theatre in Moscow.

He has performed as a soloist with the Clemencic Consort since 2001. Contemporary composers who have dedicated works to him include Flavio Colusso, Sergio Rendine, Carlo Crivelli, and René Clemencic.
