= Simone Bartolini =

Italian sopranist

Simone Bartolini is an Italian sopranist.

Simone Bartolini was born in Pesaro, where he began to study singing. He moved to Rome where he carried out his studies with Anne English Santucci and began to study acting. He specialized with Gloria Banditelli.

He was invited to sing in several reviews, festivals and by musical associations. He has been held in the greatest regards by the press, TV and critics. Some of his recitals have been broadcast by Radio Tre, Radio Uno and Rai-Radio Televisione Italiana. He has been a guest of TVE in Madrid, the Spanish National television. In collaboration with musicians specialized in the Baroque repertoire, he has been carrying out a musical survey in order to perform the music written for the castrati. He is the founder of the instrumental and vocal ensemble Arcadia di Roma.

Maestro Roberto De Simone has invited him to sing some of his compositions for the "Mistero Napoletano" within the concert held at the Teatro di Corte of the Palazzo Reale, Naples, in 1997. Franco Battiato has written for him a composition entitled "Invito al viaggio" which was included in a show staged during the Taormina Festival 1999. The whole musical show will be released as a recording by Universal Musica Italia. He has collaborated with CIMA (Centro Italiano di Musica Antica) for a CD, recording the Third Psalm from "Estro Poetico Armonico" by Benedetto Marcello, for the record company Kicco Music, conducted by Riccardo Martinini.

During the Festival delle Ville Tuscolane, Rome he sang with Franco Battiato in "Le Icone della Musica" music event. He also sang with Battiato at the Teatro dell'Accademia, Naples.

Franco Battiato has invited him to take part to some important concerts such as Taormina Arte, August 1999, Vatican City (Sala Nervi), October 1999, New York (The Town Hall), January 2000. Battiato has chosen him as the protagonist of his latest work "Campi Magnetici" whose premiere is scheduled to take place in June 2000 at the Maggio Musicale Fiorentino and recorded by Sony Classical. Bartolini has been consultant for the Baroque music at the Festival delle Ville Tuscolane, Rome (1998/99). For the 1999 Festival edition he has been in charge of the music review "Gli Angeli del Canto".
