= Laurence Dale =

English tenor, conductor and artistic director

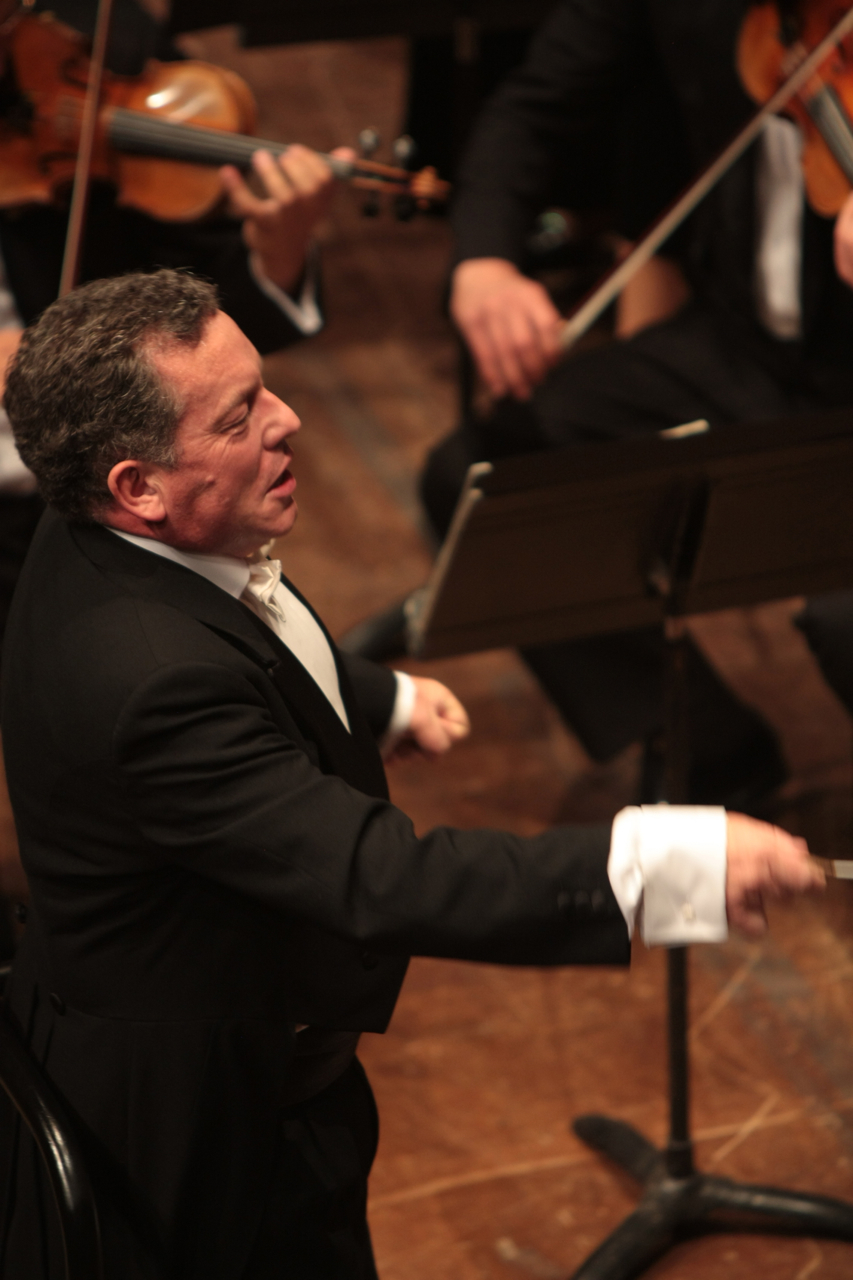
Laurence Dale directing l'Orchestre du Festival d'Evian, May 2012

Laurence Dale (born 1957) is an English tenor, artistic director and conductor.

== Biography ==
Laurence Dale studied singing at London's Guildhall School of Music and Drama with Rudolf Piernay and the Mozarteum in Salzburg.

Early leading roles included that of Hilarion in the Gilbert and Sullivan opera Princess Ida with the London Symphony Orchestra and the Ambrosian Opera Chorus in 1982, and Ramiro in Rossini's opera La Cenerentola with the Glyndebourne Festival Opera in 1983.

In 1984 he appeared in the Channel 4 series Top C's and Tiaras.

Amongst many Mozartian rôles, as well as baroque and romantic, his portrayal of Tamino, with which he opened Mozart year in Salzburg in 1991 was described by the press as legendary. He performed this rôle regularly in Vienna's Staatsoper and Berlin's Deutsche Oper, then in Paris Opera Bastille and throughout the world. In 1992, he created the Rodrigue in Rodrigue et Chimène to open the new opera in Lyon, recorded for Erato Records under the direction of Kent Nagano.

Following the performance of Claudio Monteverdi's Orfeo as celebrations for Herbert Wernicke's Monteverdi year production at the 1993 Salzburg Festival, he recorded the title rôle under the direction of René Jacobs for Harmonia Mundi.

He has recorded under the direction of Georges Prêtre, Gounod's Messe de Saint Cécile alongside Barbara Hendricks and Jean-Philippe Lafont, Mozart's C minor mass with Franz Welser-Möst, and the title rôles of Auber's Gustave III and Etienne Mehul's Joseph en Egypte.

Having created the rôle of Don José in Peter Brook's La Tragédie de Carmen in 1981 at the Bouffes du Nord in Paris, and played the rôle through three seasons, including New York, that Peter Brook turned him to re-direct the production for the Opera de Bordeaux and further performances on tour.

Immediately afterwards he directed Lehar's Der Zarewitsch for the Operette Festival, Bad Ischl and literally the next day, Haydn's L'Incontro improvviso for the Haydn Festival Eisenstadt and EXPO 2000, Hannover. These productions received praise from the Viennese press, which led to him being re-invited at Bad Ischl, in a co-production with Salzburg to mount Lehar's Das Land des Lächelns (designed by Hartmut Schörghofer).

In 2001, he conceived and prepared the New York Off Broadway Salsa musical (¡MUSICA!), which following the disaster of 11 September had to be abandoned. He directed the French première at Nantes of Thomas Adès's Powder Her Face, (conducted by John Burdekin). In 2002, he mounted two operas for New York Gotham Chamber Opera, Les Malheurs d'Orphée by Milhaud and Purcell's Dido and Aeneas (designed by Dipu Gupta and Fabio Toblini and conducted by Neal Goren). In 2003 a third Lehar's operetta was presented in Bad Ischl, The Count of Luxemburg, having originally opened in Innsbruck. He re-conceived the 1769 farcical opera L'Operia Seria (Gassmann) with the Dutch Reisopera, and made his own performing edition of Offenbach's Hoffmann's Tales. He mounted the double bill Poulenc's La Voix Humaine and Ravel's l'Heure Espagnole in 2011, as Rossini's La Pietra del Paragone for Opera Trionfo, or Die Fledermauss from Johann Strauss at the Norvegian National Opera in 2012.

As the artistic director of l'Opéra de Metz he staged Britten's Turn of the Screw, Thomas Adès Powder Her Face, and Lehar's Land of Smiles. For the opening of the season Les Jeux de Pouvoir, he mounted the twin productions of Auber's Gustave III (the modern stage première) and Verdi's Gustavo III the French première of the original version of Un Ballo in Maschera). He completed this unique season with Meyerbeer's Les Huguenots (starring Rockwell Blake as Raoul. In South Africa, as Artistic Consultant to Opera Africa in Gauteng, he directed Bellini's I Capuleti e i Montecchi, and Verdi's Aida. He created Opera Extravaganza expressly to showcase new South Africa singers whom he formed, trained and caches.

He redirected his 2006 Opéra de Monte Carlo production of Richard Strauss Ariadne auf Naxos for l'Opéra Royal de Wallonie, Liège.

The 16 March 2008 Laurence Dale stood in for the indisposed conductor, entered the pit at the Civic Johannesburg and conducted the Johannesburg Philharmonic in the performance of Aida. Since then, he has received invitations to conduct concerts and operas and, after 10 years as artistic director of the Evian Festival Les Escales Musicales, has been additionally named musical director of the festival. In June 2011 he welcomed to Evian the chorus and orchestra of the Opera National de Lorraine which he conducted in Gounod's Ste Cécila Mass and Elgar's The Music Makers (the French première). In 2009 he conducted the Sinfonia Varsovia and the Ensemble Vocal de Lausanne in a concert comprising Fauré's Requiem and works of Wagner and Rossini. For the 2010 season, he conducted the Philharmonie of the Nations.

Dale teamed up with composer and conductor George Petrou to create a new opera pastiche Sarrasine (opera) which premiered on 10 May 2024 at the Göttingen International Handel Festival.

== Stage Director ==
- 2026 Richard Wagner: Tristano e Isotta - Teatro Carlo Felice Genoa
- 2025 Richard Strauss: Die Liebe der Danae - Teatro Carlo Felice Genoa
- 2024 new opera pastiche Sarrasine - Göttingen International Handel Festival
- 2023 Giuseppe Verdi: Simon Boccanegra - Opera Philadelphia.
- 2012 Johann Strauss: Die Fledermaus - Den Norske Opera.
- 2011 Maurice Ravel: L'heure espagnole - Enschede - Nationale Reisopera.
- 2011 Francis Poulenc: La Voix humaine - Enschede - Nationale Reisopera.
- 2011 Gioacchino Rossini: La pietra del paragone - Opera Trionfo Heemstede.
- 2010 Vincenzo Bellini: Norma - Moldavian National Opera, Chisinau.
- 2009 Richard Strauss: Ariadne auf Naxos - Opéra Royal de Wallonie.
- 2008 Albert Lortzing: Zar und Zimmermann - Tiroler Landestheater.
- 2008 Giuseppe Verdi: Aïda - Opera Africa, Johannesburg.
- 2007 Jacques Offenbach: Les Contes d'Hoffmann - Nationale Reisopera.
- 2007 Opera Extravaganza - Opera Africa.
- 2006 Vincenzo Bellini: I Capuleti e i Montecchi - Opera Africa.
- 2006 Wolfgang Amadeus Mozart: Don Giovanni - Vlaams Radio Orkest in Amsterdam Concertgebouw.
- 2006 Richard Strauss: Ariadne auf Naxos - Opéra Royal de Monte Carlo.
- 2005 Florian Leopold Gassmann: L'Operia Seria - Nationale Reisopera Enschede.
- 2004 Giacomo Meyerbeer: Les Huguenots - Opéra Théâtre de Metz.
- 2003 Daniel Auber: Gustave III, ou Le bal masqué - Opéra Théâtre de Metz.
- 2003 Franz Lehár: Der Graf von Luxemburg - Lehár Festival, Bad Ischl.
- 2002 Darius Milhaud: Les Malheurs d'Orphée - Gotham Chamber Opera.
- 2002 Henry Purcell: Dido and Aeneas - Gotham Chamber Opera.
- 2002 Franz Lehár: Das Land des Lächelns - Salzburger Landestheater.
- 2001 Thomas Adès: Powder Her Face - Angers Nantes Opéra.
- 2000 Franz Joseph Haydn: L'incontro improvviso - Haydn Festival Eisenstadt.
- 2000 Franz Lehár: Der Zarewitsch - Lehár Festival, Bad Ischl.

== Artistic Director ==
- 2001-2012 Festival International d'Evian: Escales Musicales - Grange au Lac

== Discography ==
- Various French Opera Arias - Orchestre Lyrique et Symphonique de Nancy. Conductor : Kenneth Montgomery - Harmonia Mundi
- Daniel-François-Esprit Auber : Gustave III ou le Bal Masqué (with Brigitte Lafon, Roger Pujol, Rima Tawill, Gilles Dubernet, Christian Treguier, Valérie Marestin). Conductor : Michel Swierczewski - Arion
- Francesco Cavalli : La Didonne - Balthazar-Neumann Ensemble. Conductor : Thomas Hengelbrock - DHM Deutsche Harmonia Mundi
- Ernest Chausson : La Légende de Sainte Cécile - Ensemble Orchestral de Paris & Choeurs de Radio France. Conductor : Jean-Jacques Kantorow - EMI Classics
- François-Adrien Boïeldieu : Le Calife de Bagdad (with Lydia Mayo, Joelle Michelini, Claudine Cheriez, Huw Rhys-Evans) - Choeur et Orchestre Camerata de Provence. Conductor : Antonio de Almeida - Disque Dom
- Charles Gounod : Messe Solennelle de Sainte Cécile (with Barbara Hendricks et Jean-Philippe Lafont) - Nouvel Orchestre Philharmonique et Choeurs de Radio France. Conductor Georges Prêtre - EMI Classics
- Claude Debussy : Rodrigue et Chimène (with Donna Brown, José Van Dam, Jules Bastin) - Choeur et Orchestre de l'Opéra de Lyon. Conductor : Kent Nagano. Erato - Musifrance - Radio France.
- Arthur Honegger : Le Roi David (with Daniel Mesguich, Alessandra Marc, Sylvie Sullé) - Choeur du Festival de Saint Denis, Orchestre National de Lille. Conductor : Jean-Claude Casadesus. EMI Classics.
- Albert Ketèlbey : Sur un Marché Persan (with Michael Reeves) - Ambrosian Singers and the London Promenade Orchestra. Conductor Alexander Faris. Philips.
- Etienne Méhul : Le Chant du Départ (with Frédéric Vassar, René Massis, Brigitte Lafon, Philippe Jorquera, Antoine Normand, Philippe Pistole, Natalie Dessay) - Conductor : Claude Bardon
- Claudio Monteverdi : Orfeo (with Efrat Ben-Nun, Jennifer Larmore, Paul Gerimon, Bernarda Fink, Harry Peeters, Andreas Scholl, Nicolas Rivenq) - Concerto Vocale. Conductor : René Jacobs. WDR Harmonia Mundi.
- Wolfgang Amadeus Mozart : Requiem (with Edith Wiens, Dame Felicity Lott, Della Jones, Keyth Lewis, Willard White, Robert Lloyd). London Philharmonic Choir and London Philharmonic Orchestra. Conductor Franz Welser-Möst. Label : CFP.
- Henry Purcell : The Fairy Queen (with Barbara Bonney, von Magnus, McNair, Chance, Michaels-Moore) - Arnold Schoenberg Chor & Concentus Musicus Wien. Conductor Nikolaus Harnoncourt. TELDEC
- Gioachino Rossini : Maometto Secondo (with June Anderson, Margarita Zimmermann, Ernesto Palacio, Samuel Ramey) - Ambrosian Opera Chorus, The Philharmonia Orchestra. Conductor : Claudio Scimone. Philips
- Albert Roussel : Padmâvatî (with Marilyn Horne, Nicolai Gedda, José van Dam, Jane Berbié, Charles Burles) - Orchestre du Capitole de Toulouse. Conductor : Michel Plasson. EMI Classics.

== DVD ==
- Francis Poulenc : Dialogues des Carmélites (with Anne-Sophie Schmidt, Millot, Nadine Denize, Patricia Petitbon, Brigitte Fassbaender). Orchestre Philharmonique de Strasbourg. Conductor : Jan Latham-Koenig. DVD Opéra du Rhin.
- Etienne Méhul : La Légende de Joseph en Egypte (with Brigitte Lafon, René Massis, Natalie Dessay, Frédéric Vassar, Philippe Jorquera, Jezable Carpi, Abbi Patrix) - Ensemble vocal Intermezzo, Orchestre Régional de Picardie. Conductor : Claude Bardon. Théâtre Impérial de Compiègne 1989. Adaptation and stage directoring : Pierre Jourdan.
- Gioachino Rossini : La Cenerentola (with Kathleen Kuhlmann, Laura Zannini, Marta Taddei, Claudio Desderi, Alberto Rinaldi, Roderick Kennedy) - Stage director : John Cox. Glyndebourne Festival Opera. Conductor : Donato Renzetti.
- Giuseppe Verdi : Falstaff (with José van Dam, William Stone, Barbara Madra, Livia Budai) - Stage director : Lluis Pasqual. Théâtre Royal de la Monnaie de Bruxelles. Conductor : Sylvain Cambreling.
- La Tragédie de Carmen : Film of Peter Brook following Georges Bizet, Prosper Mérimée, Meihlac and Halévy. Adaptation from Marius Constant, Jean-Claude Carrière, Peter Brook. Conductor : Marius Constant. EMI
- Le Secret d'Offenbach : Patachon in Les Deux Aveugles (with Graham Clark). Film director : István Szabó. TV 1996
- William S. Gilbert & Sullivan : Princess Ida (with Frank Gorshin, Neil Howlett, Bernard Dickerson, Richard Jackson). Stage director : Dave Heather. TV Movie 1982.
