= Oskar Hagen =

German art historian

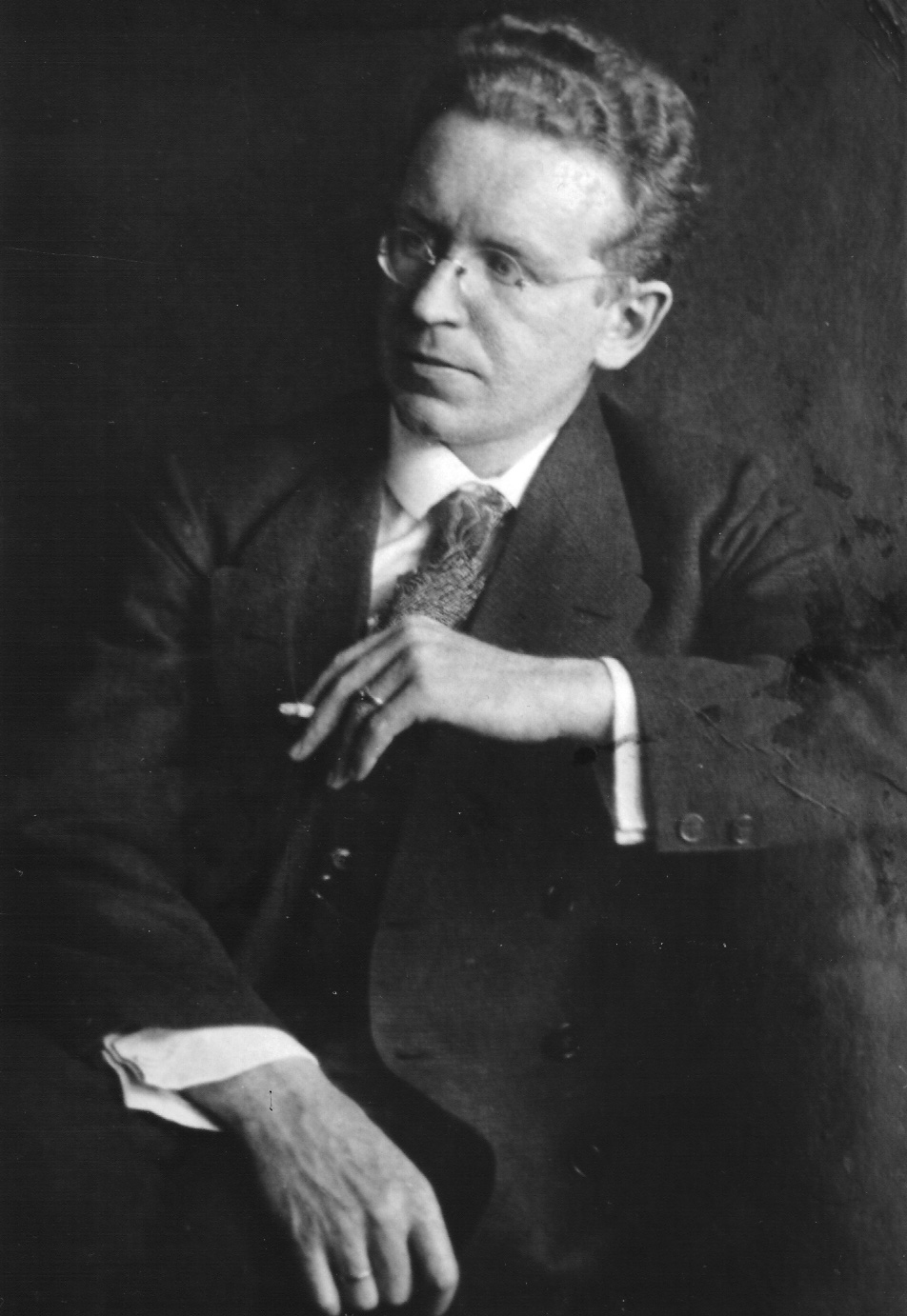
Oskar Hagen, 1922

Oskar Hagen (14 October 1888, Wiesbaden, Germany – 5 October 1957, in Madison, Wisconsin, United States) was a German art historian.

While lecturing at the University of Göttingen from 1918 to 1925, Hagen helped establish the Göttingen International Handel Festival. He established the revival of Handel operas in Germany, beginning with his heavily-edited version of Rodelinda in 1920. He later moved to the United States to be professor at the University of Wisconsin, where he founded the department of Art History. In addition to his work as an art historian, Hagen also composed original music. Hagen is the father of actress and drama teacher Uta Hagen.
