= Rodolfo Celletti =

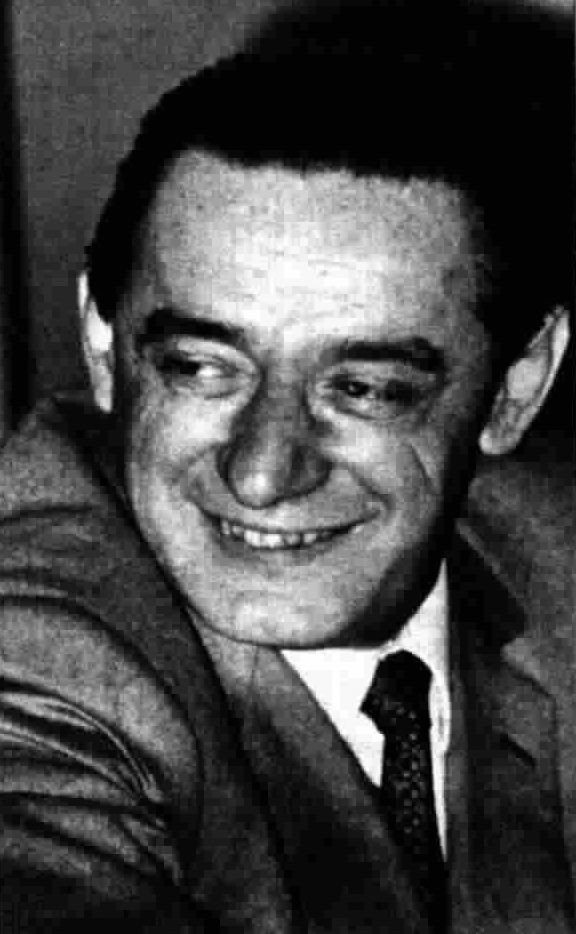
Rodolfo Celletti

Rodolfo Celletti (1917–2004) was an Italian musicologist, critic, voice teacher, and novelist. Considered one of the leading scholars of the operatic voice and the history of operatic performance, he published many books and articles on the subject as well as several novels.

== Biography ==
Celletti was born in Rome on 13 June 1917. He served in the Italian army from 1937 to 1943, and after World War II, took a degree in law from the University of Rome. He became a successful business executive in Milan, and then created a second career for himself as a (self-taught) musicologist and critic.

For many years he was the music critic of the Italian weekly magazine Epoca and was a regular contributor to la Repubblica, L'opera, Nuova rivista musicale italiana, Opera, and Amadeus. In addition to his articles in specialist publications and The New Grove Dictionary of Opera, he published several books, most notably Le grandi voci (1964), at the time considered the most complete biographical and critical source available on the great operatic voices and Storia del belcanto (1983), which has since been translated into English, French, German and Czech.

From 1980 to 1993 he was the Artistic Director of the Festival della Valle d'Itria in Martina Franca. The Festival, which specializes in performing rare operas and the original versions of operas still in the standard repertoire, also provides coaching in vocal performance for young singers. Celletti taught voice both privately and in master classes, many of them at the Festival della Valle d'Itria. Amongst his former pupils are Francesca Franci, Denia Mazzola, Mariana Nicolesco, Angelo Manzotti, William Matteuzzi and Ramón Vargas. Another eminent pupil of his, Raina Kabaivanska, will not fail to show her warm appreciation for his talents as a master of bel canto.

Celletti died in October 2004 at the age of 87. In August of the following year, the Festival della Valle d'Itria performed Cherubini's Requiem in C minor in his memory.

== Books ==
=== Non-fiction ===
- Le grandi voci: Dizionario critico, biografico dei cantanti, Istituto per la collaborazione culturale, 1964
- Il teatro d'opera in disco, Rizzoli, 1976.
- Storia del belcanto, Discanto, 1983 (also published in English translation as A History of Bel Canto, Clarendon Press, 1991, ISBN 0-19-313209-5)
- Memorie d'un ascoltatore: Cronache musicali vere e immaginarie, Il Saggiatore, 1985.
- Il canto, Garzanti (Edizioni Speciali Vallardi), 1989
- Voce di tenore, IdeaLibri, 1989. ISBN 88-7082-127-7
- Storia dell'opera italiana, Garzanti, 2000. ISBN 88-479-0024-7
- La grana della voce: opere, direttori e cantanti, Baldini & Castoldi, 2000. ISBN 88-8089-781-0

=== Novels ===
- Viale Bianca Maria, Feltrinelli, 1961 (also published in English translation as Marta, George Braziller, 1962, ISBN 0-8076-0177-2)
- Gli squadriglieri, Bompiani, 1975
- Tu che le vanità, Rizzoli, 1981
- L'infermiera inglese, Giunti, 1995. ISBN 88-09-20632-0

== Notes and references ==
- Enciclopedia della musica, "Celletti, Rodolfo", De Agostini Scuola SpA . Accessed 20 March 2009.
- "Fabris, Dinko "Romeo e Giulietta tutto al femminile per il Valle d' Itria", la Repubblica (Bari edition), 6 August 2005, p. 12. Accessed 20 March 2009.
- Festival della Valle d'Itria, Requiem in do minore di Cherubini, August 2005. Accessed 20 March 2009.
- Healey, Robin, Twentieth-century Italian literature in English translation: an annotated bibliography 1929-1997, University of Toronto Press, 1998. ISBN 0-8020-0800-3
- Il Sagittario, Storia dell'opera italiana di Rodolfo Celletti, Accessed 20 March 2009.
- Sadie, Stanley (ed.), "Celletti, Rodolfo" in The New Grove Dictionary of Opera Vol. 1, Grove's Dictionaries of Music, 1992. ISBN 0-935859-92-6
