= Angelo Manzotti =

Italian opera singer

Angelo Manzotti (born 1971 in Marmirolo, Italy) is an Italian countertenor or sopranist.

He began singing in the falsetto register at the age of twelve. He studied at the Accademia Rossiniana in Pesaro and made his debut in August 1989 at the Rossini Opera Festival there. After perfecting his technique with Rodolfo Celletti, he won the 1992 Luciano Pavarotti International Competition in Philadelphia. He has developed a special technique where only the front parts of the vocal cords vibrate, and in this way, he is able to avoid having to use the falsetto, obtaining a clear voice, remarkably similar to a woman's voice.

His first recording, Arie di Farinelli (Bongiovanni, 1995), was awarded the "Timbre de Platine" by Opéra International.
