= Samuel Mariño =

Venezuelan-born opera singer

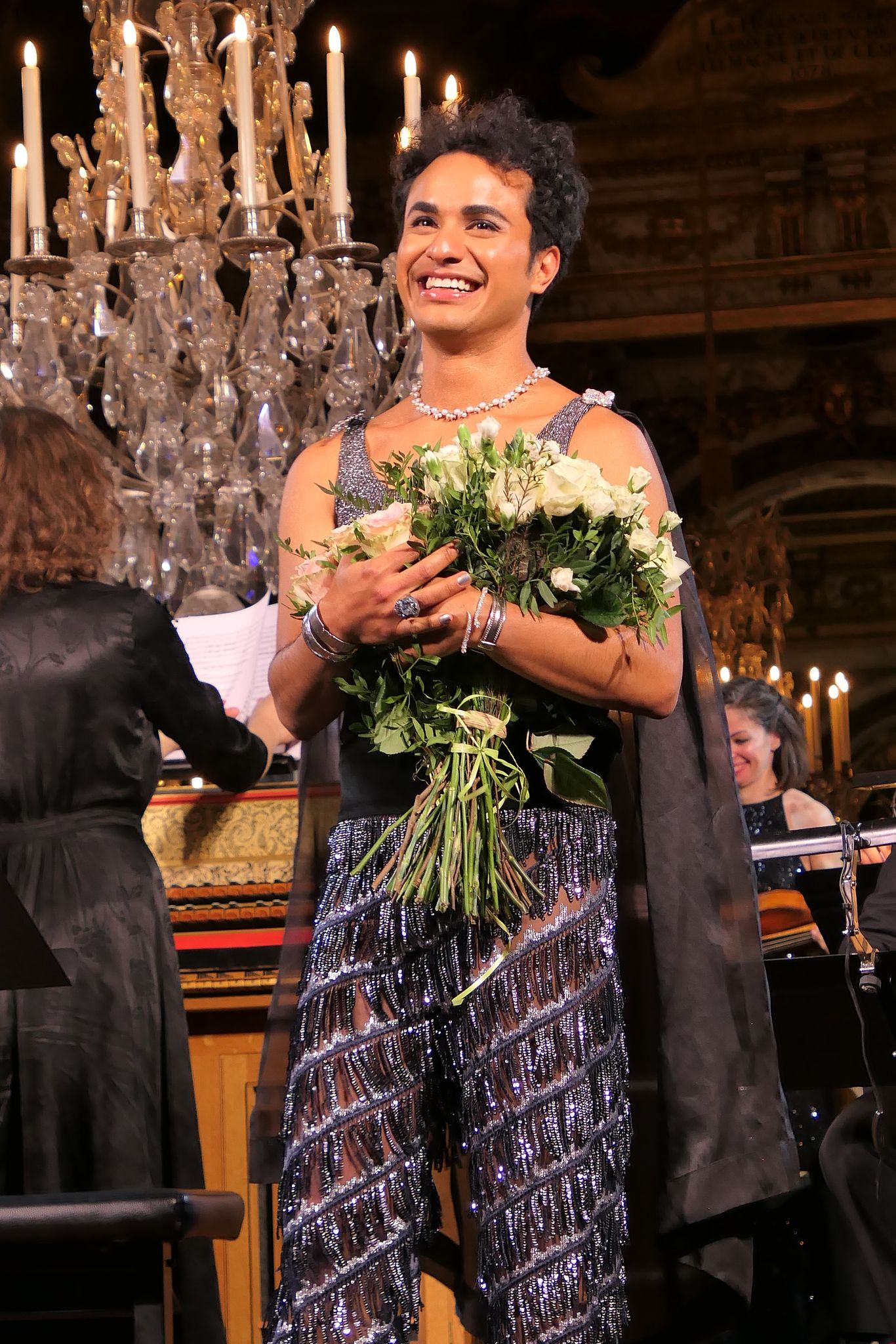
- Samuel Mariño at solo recital in the Hall of Mirrors of the Palace of Versailles, 2023
- Born: 26 November 1993 (age 31); Caracas, Venezuela
- Occupation(s): Opera singer (male soprano) and recitalist
- Website: www.samuelmarino.com

Samuel Mariño (born 26 November 1993) is a Venezuelan-born male soprano opera singer and recitalist.

== Early life ==
Samuel Mariño was born in Caracas, Venezuela, into a family of university professor parents and two siblings. Initially training as a ballet dancer at the Venezuelan National School of Dance and studying piano at the National Conservatory in Caracas, Mariño did not begin formal vocal training until his late teens. During puberty, Mariño’s voice did not undergo a typical mutation and retained the high pitch characteristic of prepubescent voice. As a gay teenager with an unusually high voice, he was subject to frequent bullying. Mariño and his family even sought medical advice about lowering his voice through surgery and therapy. He was persuaded to keep his natural soprano and to pursue vocal training and operatic career.

== Education and career ==
Mariño commenced formal vocal study at the National Conservatory in Caracas. His first operatic experience was with Camerata Barroca in Caracas, where he had the opportunity to work with Gustavo Dudamel, Helmuth Rilling, and Theodore Kuchar. Encouraged by his teachers to continue his studies in Europe, Mariño raised funds for his move by making and selling lemon pies with his mother.

When he was 18, Mariño moved to France to continue his vocal studies at the Conservatoire de Paris, while supporting himself with a variety of jobs that included hotel reception desks and a brief stint at Disneyland Paris. A decisive role in Mariño's career was played by American soprano Barbara Bonney who became a crucial teacher and mentor guiding Mariño to embrace and develop his natural soprano voice. In 2017, he received the Interpretation Award at the Opéra de Marseille International Singing Competition and won the Neue Stimmen Audience Prize.

Mariño’s debut solo album titled Care Pupille was released on Orfeo in 2020 and featured a collection of rarely recorded works by Handel, Gluck, Cimarosa and Joseph Bologne, Chevalier de Saint-Georges. In 2021, the singer recorded works by Pergolesi, Vivaldi, Porpora, Graun, Vinci, Handel and Monteverdi for two albums on the Chateau de Versailles Spectacles label: Stabat Mater and The Three Countertenors. In March of 2022, Mariño was signed by Decca Classics. Sopranista, his debut album with Decca, was released later that year and nominated for Opus Classik award in the Young Talent of the Year and the Singing (Opera) categories. The singer's second album with the label, Lumina, was released on 25 July 2025.

Mariño has been widely sought as a recitalist and soloist around the world. In April of 2022, he made his debut solo recital in London at St. Martin-in-the-Fields. In September of the same year, the singer made his Australian debut with the Australian Brandenburg Orchestra and returned for a second tour of performances in Sydney and Melbourne in February of 2025, to much anticipation and critical acclaim. In February 2023, Mariño was part of the first-ever South Korean tour of the Orchestra of the Royal Opera of Versailles (Orchestre de l’Opéra Royal du Château de Versailles). In April of 2023, Mariño made his Argentinian debut at the Teatro Colon in Buenos Aires with the Gabetta Consort. Later that month, he made his Canadian debut with the Tafelmusik Baroque Orchestra and returned to Toronto again for a series of concerts at Koerner Hall in May of 2025. His United States debut was in May of 2023 with the Camerata Pacifica in Santa Barbara and Los Angeles. In June of 2025, Mariño made his China debut as the star of the seven-city Three Countertenors program tour of the Orchestra of the Royal Opera of Versailles (Orchestre de l’Opéra Royal du Château de Versailles) where his stunning soprano voice and gender-transcending beauty were noted for their power to break through the prejudices, elicit the sense of wonder and foster cultural change.

Other notable recent debuts and collaborations include a series of performances with the Capella Cracoviensis in Krakow, Poland, gala concerts for Cartier at the Daigo-ji Temple in Kyoto, Japan with harpist Xavier de Maistre a recital at the Pablo Casals Symphony Hall in San Juan, Puerto Rico with pianist Jonathan Ware, a solo concert with the Norwegian National Opera and Ballet in Oslo, a solo recital at the Versailles's Galerie des Glaces, debut performances and concert tours in Switzerland, Italy, Spain, Malta and the Canary Islands with the musicians of the Gabetta Consort and the Concerto de' Cavalieri ensembles. Also in recent years, Mariño was invited to present solo programs at several prestigious music festivals, including the Handel Festival in Halle, Germany, the Gluck Festival in Nuremberg, Germany, the Styriarte Festival in Graz, Austria, the Gstaad New Year Music Festival in Switzerland, Świdnica Bach Festival in Poland, and Ruhrtriennale festival in Germany.

Since his debut on the opera stage in 2018 as Alessandro in Handel's Berenice, which earned him a nomination for Best Revelation Artist by Opernwelt, Mariño performed a number of operatic roles. In May of 2024, the singer created the role of Zambinella, a star of the Roman opera stage, in the new opera pastiche Sarrasine based on the eponymous novella by Honoré de Balzac and featuring the never performed opera music by Handel. As critics noted, Mariño's ultra rare natural soprano voice, combined with an exceptionally gender-fluid appearance and years of ballet training, made him uniquely capable of embodying the role of a soprano castrato, whose 'ideal feminine' beauty and voice are at the center of Balzac's work most explicitly concerned with the questions of art, voice, desire, gender, and sexuality. In the summer of 2023, the singer made his United Kingdom operatic debut as Iris in Glyndebourne Festival's first-ever production of Handel's Semele with the Orchestra of the Age of Enlightenment. In previous years, his opera roles included Oberto in Handel's Alcina, Postumio in Graun's Silla, Angelo in Handel's La resurrezione, Demetrio in Gluck's Antigono, Curazio in Cimarosa's Gli Orazi e i Curiazi, Tamiri in Angesi's Il re pastore, the title role in Handel's Teseo and a star turn in Krystian Lada's queer thriller opera pasticcio Mysteries of Desire. In a historic first, Mariño sang the soprano solo part in Mahler's remarkable Symphony No. 4, a role that has never before been performed by an adult male singer.

Mariño has been noted for the gender-transcending character of his voice, repertoire, images and performances. Starting with operatic music written for castrato soprano male roles, his concert and recital repertoire has been expanding to include the material written for soprano female roles and female soprano singers, including Handel's Cleopatra (Giulio Cesare in Egitto), Atalanta, Berenice, Rodelinda, Semele, Alcina, Belezza (Il Trionfo) and Almirena (Rinaldo), Caldara's Santa Eugenia (Il Trionfo dell'innocenza), Mozart's Countess Almaviva (The Marriage of Figaro), Dvořák's Rusalka and virtuoso concert arias for soprano by Mozart, Haydn and Beethoven. While his natural soprano voice defies prevailing gender conceptions as such, both on and off the stage Mariño embodies and creates gender-fluid and norm-defying artistic and personal expressions that challenge cultural expectations. One example of Mariño's cultural significance, reach and impact include are BBC News video feature about his voice and work that was produced and distributed in over half a dozen languages of BBC's largest Instagram international services, including Spanish, Brazilian Portuguese, Chinese, Thai, Turkish, English and Pidgin English. Another set of indicators are multiple interviews and articles about the artist that have been published in the leading newspapers and magazines and invariably involved discussion of these issues and causes. In many of his interviews, Mariño emphasized that his unique vocal gift, combined with several distinguishing aspects of his identity, background, and life experience, motivate him to challenge the conventions and boundaries of the opera world and to invite and encourage underrepresented audiences and singers.

Mariño has publicly supported and championed a number of causes. Gender and sexual freedom and equal rights for LGBTQ+ people are the issues that the singer has been regularly raising and supporting in the press, on social media and in his concerts, as well as through participation in charitable events such as Norway Pride 50th Anniversary Concert at the Norwegian National Opera and Ballet in Oslo, televised on NRK1, and the German AIDS-Foundation Opera Gala in Düsseldorf. He has publicly supported Ukraine, rebuked harassment and threats connected to his stance, and contributed his talents to the "Rebuild Ukraine" Opera Benefit Gala at the Konzerthaus Berlin under the artistic direction of Keri-Lynn Wilson. The singer has also advocated for more awareness of and support for people living with mental health issues, and participated in Decca Classics and Gramophone Mental Health Awareness Month campaigns.

== Discography ==
- Care Pupille: Handel, Gluck, Samuel Mariño, male soprano, with Händelfestspielorchester Halle directed by Michael Hofstetter, released by Orfeo label (2020)
- Pergolèse, Vivaldi: Stabat Mater pour deux castrats, Samuel Mariño, soprano, Filippo Mineccia, alto, with Orchestre de l'Opéra Royal directed by Marie van Rhijn, released by Château de Versailles Spectacles label (2021)
- Les 3 Contre-Ténors: Le Concours de Virtuosité des Castrats, Samuel Mariño, Filippo Mineccia, Valer Sabadus, Orchestre de l'Opéra Royal directed by Stefan Plewniak, released by Château de Versailles Spectacles label (2021)
- Sopranista, Samuel Mariño, sopranista, with La Cetra Barockorchester directed by Andrea Marcon, released by Decca Classics label (2022)
- Carl Heinrich Graun: Silla (role of Postumio) with Bejun Mehta, Valer Sabadus, Hagen Matzeit, Eleonora Bellocci, Roberta Invernizzi, Mert Sungu, Coro Maghini, Innsbrucker Festwochenorchester directed by Alessandro de Marchi, released by cpo label (2023)
- Yánez: Viajera del río (Arr. Assad for Voice and Guitar) - Single, Samuel Mariño, Plínio Fernandes, released by Decca Classics label (2023)
- Lumina, Samuel Mariño, Jonathan Ware, Covent Garden Sinfonia, Ben Palmer, released by Decca Classics label (2025)
