= George Petrou =

Greek conductor

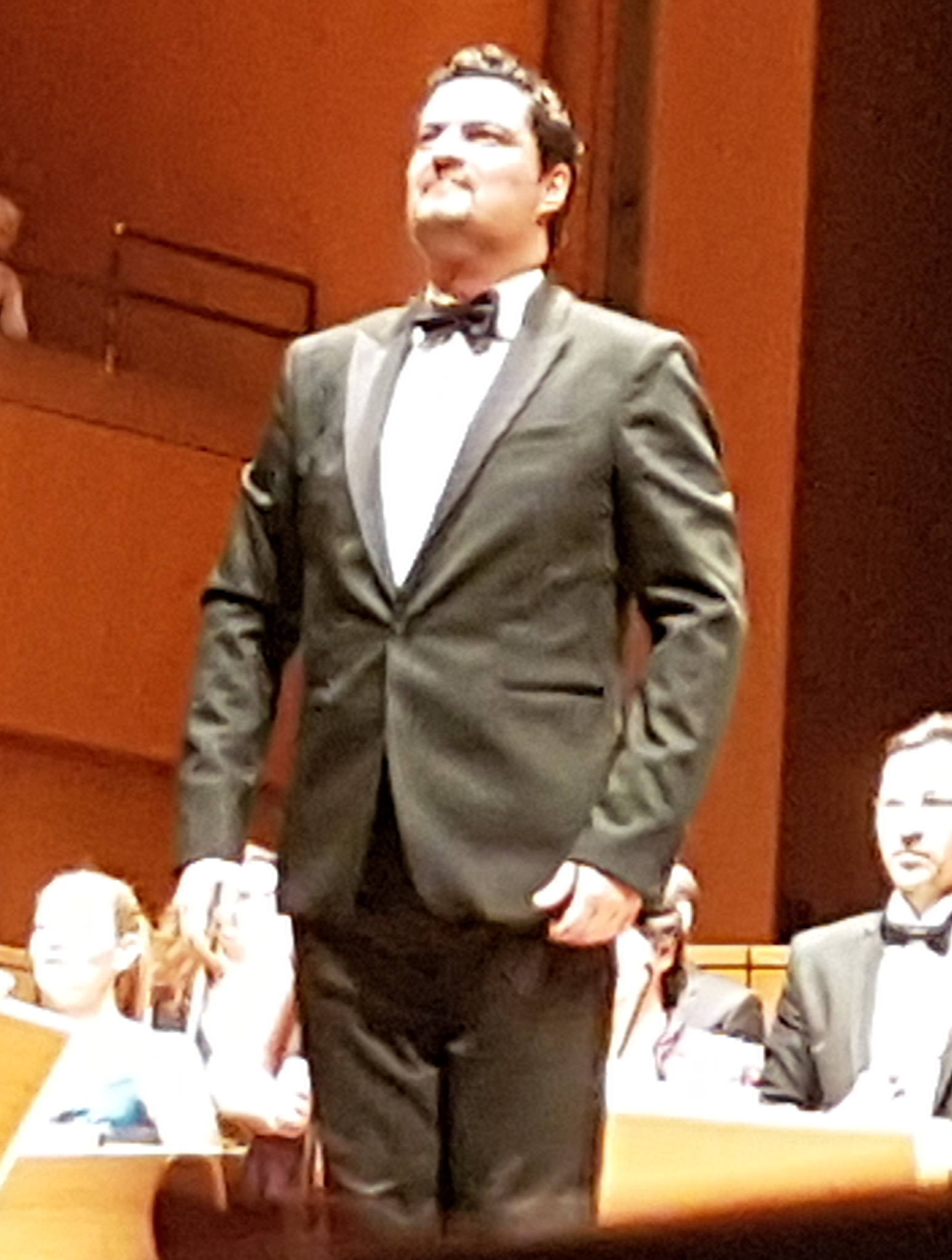
George Petrou

George Petrou (Greek: Γιώργος Πέτρου) is a Greek conductor, pianist and stage-director.

== Biography ==
George Petrou was born in Greece. He studied at the Athens Conservatoire, the Royal College and the Royal Academy of Music in London. He started an early career as a concert pianist, but began conducting, developing a parallel interest in historical keyboard instruments and their practices. Since 2012 he has been the artistic director of the Athens-based orchestra Armonia Atenea (former Athens Camerata) with which he tours and records, performing both on period or modern instruments. Starting in the 2021-2022 season, Petrou has been an artistic director of the Göttingen International Handel Festival.

He also stage-directs and has recently signed several opera and musical theatre productions, including Handel's Alcina, Porter's Kiss Me Kate, Bernstein's West Side Story, Sondheim's Sweeney Todd and Company and The Godson by Theophrastos Sakellaridis, the most celebrated Greek operetta.

Petrou teamed up with Laurence Dale to create a new opera pastiche Sarrasine combining the never performed opera music by George Frideric Handel with the story and dialogues of the eponymous novella by Honoré de Balzac. The opera was premiered on May 10 2024 at the Göttingen International Handel Festival.

He has been a guest of major opera houses including the Opera de Toulouse, the Oper Leipzig, the Oper Köln, the Opera de Strasbourg, the Opera de Nice, the Theater an der Wien, the Nederlandse Reisopera, the Lausanne Opera, the Opera of St. Gallen, the Opera of Bern, the Korea National Opera, the Teatro Petruzzelli, the Teatro Verdi di Trieste, the Theatre Champs Elysees, the opera Royale de Versailles, the Royal Swedish Opera, the Greek National Opera working with orchestras such as the Munich Radio Orchestra, the Gewandhaus Leipzig, the Orchestre Nationale de Capitole du Toulouse, the Orchestre Philharmonique de Nice, the Noord Nederlands Orkest, the B'Rock, the NAC Orchestra (Ottawa), the Südwestdeutsche Philharmonie, the Norwegian Chamber Orchestra, the Trondheim Symphony Orchestra, the Concerto Köln, the Pomo d'Oro, the Bilkent Symphony Orchestra, the Bern Symphony Orchestra, the Cottbus Philharmonie, the Athens and Thessaloniki State Orchestras, the Greek Radio Symphony Orchestra, the Bratislava Philharmonic, the Musica Viva, the New Russia Symphony Orchestra. He has performed at festivals including the Salzburg Pfingsfestspiele, the BBC Proms, the Klara festival in Brussels, the Handel festivals of Halle and Karlsruhe, the festival de Valle Itria (Martina Franca).

Petrou has released recordings with Deutsche Gramophone, DECCA and MDG. His recordings have been positively received by critics (Diapason d'Or, Preis der Deutsche Schalplattenkritik, Choc-Monde de la Musique, Gramophone-Editor's Choice, BBC Mag/Recording of the Month, CD of the week in The Sunday Times, Recording of the month in Musicweb, Crescendo Bestenliste Platz 1, etc.). Tamerlano was awarded the ECHO KLASSIC 2008, and Alessandro the Recording of the Year at the International Opera Awards, and the opera was voted by the viewers of Mezzo TV as Opera of the Year 2013. Petrou has received a Grammy Nomination (for Handel's Ottone released by Decca) and a Pοrin Awards nomination (for Handel's Alessandro also by Decca). He is an Associate of the Royal Academy of Music, London (ARAM), has been awarded the title of Chevalier de l'ordre des Arts et des Lettres from the French government and the Grand Prize for Music 2018 from the association of the Greek Critics of Music and Drama.

== Discography ==
- G. F. Händel : Oreste (pasticcio) (MDG)
- G. F. Händel : Arianna in Creta (MDG)
- G. F. Händel : Tamerlano (MDG)
- G. F. Händel : Giulio Cesare (MDG)
- G. F. Händel : Alessandro Severo (pasticcio) (MDG). Bonus: Niccolo Mantzaro: Don Crepuscolo
- G. F. Händel : Alessandro (Decca)
- G. F. Handel: Arminio (Decca). Also a DVD issued by the Internazionale Händel-Festspiele Karlsruhe
- S. Mayr : La Lodoiska (OEHMS)
- S. Mayr: Ginevra di Scozia (OEHMS)
- L. v. Beethoven : Die Geschöpfe des Prometheus (Decca)
- J. A. Hasse : Siroe (Decca)
- Rossini Arias with Franco Fagioli (Deutsche Gramophone)
- J. A. Hasse : ROKOKO with Max Emanuel Cencic (Decca)
- C. W. Gluck : Arias with Daniel Behle (Decca)
- A Countertenor gala (Decca)
- Baroque Divas (Decca)
- ARCHEΤYPON with Mary Ellen Nesi. (MDG)
- CATHARSIS with Xavier Sabata (Apartè)
- Masks by Dimitris Papadimitriou (Elliniko Sxedio)
- 39 Myths by Dimitris Papadimitriou (Elliniko Sxedio)
- The chronicle of an early Automn by Dimitris Papadimitriou (Elliniko Sxedio)
- Paintings by Dimitris Papadimitriou. (Elliniko Sxedio)
