= Sopranist =

Man who sings in soprano register

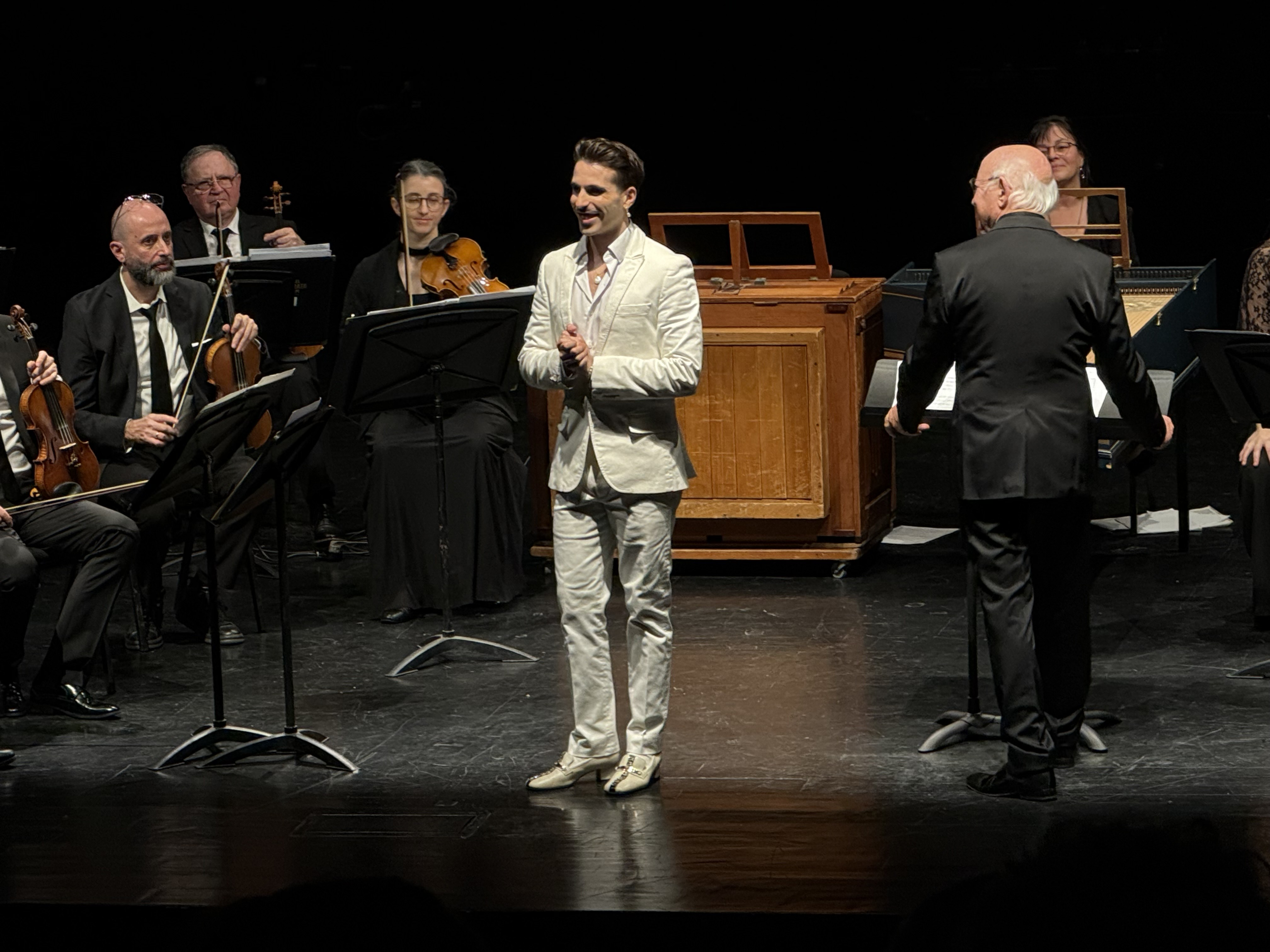
Maayan Licht is a notable sopranist.

A sopranist (also known as male soprano) is a male singer who is able to sing in vocal tessitura of a soprano, usually through falsetto or head voice technique. This voice type is a specific kind of countertenor. In rare cases an adult man may be able to sing in the soprano range using his normal or modal voice (high chest voice) and not falsetto due to endocrinological reasons, like Radu Marian, or as a result of a larynx that has not completely developed, as is allegedly the case with Michael Maniaci.

== Voice ==
A sopranist is able to sing in the soprano vocal range which is approximately between C_{4} and C_{6}, though at times may expand somewhat higher or lower. Men of all voice types can possess the wide-ranged and effective falsetto or head voice needed to produce the contralto, mezzo-soprano and soprano vocal ranges. Some countertenors can sing up into the female vocal tessituras using the modal register (normal singing production) and need not employ any falsetto.

== Controversy over the term "male soprano" ==
Typically, the term "soprano" refers to female singers, but at times the term "male soprano" has been used by men who sing in the soprano vocal range using falsetto vocal production instead of the modal voice. This practice is most commonly found in the context of choral music in England. However, these men are more commonly referred to as countertenors or sopranists. The practice of referring to countertenors as "male sopranos" is somewhat controversial within vocal pedagogical circles, as these men do not produce sound in the same physiological way that female sopranos do. Radu Marian can refer to himself as a true male soprano because he is able to sing in the soprano vocal range using the modal voice.

== Repertoire ==
There is a large body of music for the male soprano that was written when it was common to use a castrato – a voice type which, for all intents and purposes, no longer exists, as the practice of castrating trebles was abolished before the end of the 19th century. Sopranists are very rare, since most countertenors are altos and mezzos. In fact, probably because early famous countertenors were altos (like Alfred Deller), it was believed for a long time that countertenors can only be altos (and later, mezzo countertenors, like David Daniels or Jochen Kowalski were recognized). While there is some modern repertoire written for countertenors (sometimes written specifically for certain singers, like Britten's Death in Venice, which has a part that was written specifically for James Bowman), at present there are only a small number of modern pieces written specifically for the sopranist vocal type. An exception is Alfred Schnittke's 1995 opera Historia von D. Johann Fausten, which calls for both a female alto and a male soprano Mephistopheles.

== Notable sopranists ==
Present day notable sopranists include:

- Cem Adrian
- Simone Bartolini
- Aris Christofellis
- Edson Cordeiro (opera, pop, gospel)
- Robert Crowe
- David Hansen
- Russell Hitchcock
- JJ (born Johannes Pietsch)
- Vyatcheslav Kagan-Paley
- Dimash Kudaibergen
- Adam Lopez (pop, opera, Latin)
- Michael Maniaci
- Angelo Manzotti
- Radu Marian
- Samuel Mariño
- Philipp Mathmann
- Tomotaka Okamoto
- Brian Charles Rooney (musical theatre)
- Bruno de Sá
- Tonex (gospel)
- André Vásáry (opera, pop)
- Vitas
- Zhou Shen
- Maayan Licht

== See also ==
- Superius
- Farinelli
