= Göttingen International Handel Festival =

German music festival

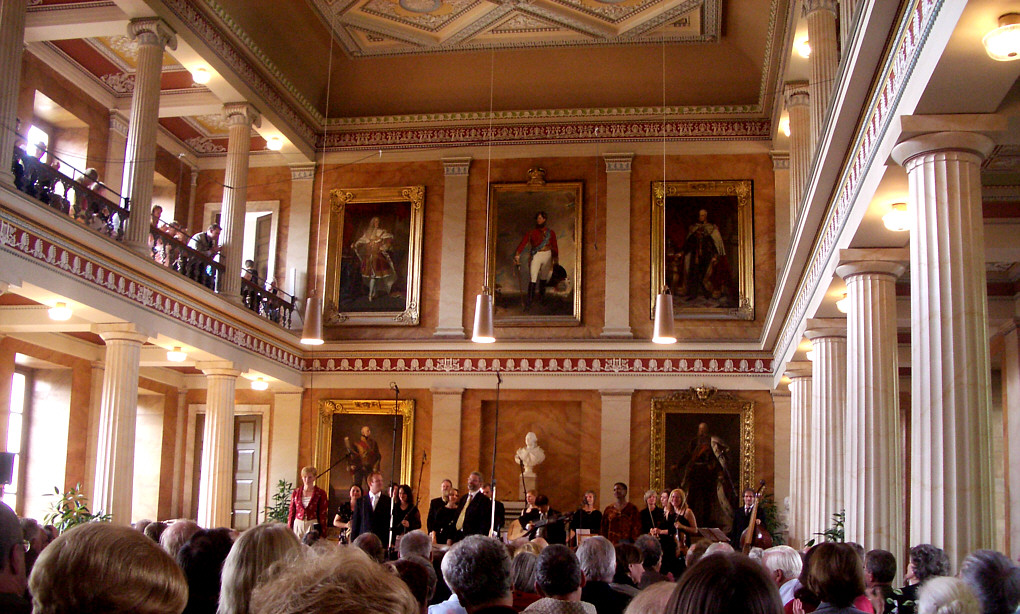
2005 concert at the Händel-Festspiele in the University of Göttingen

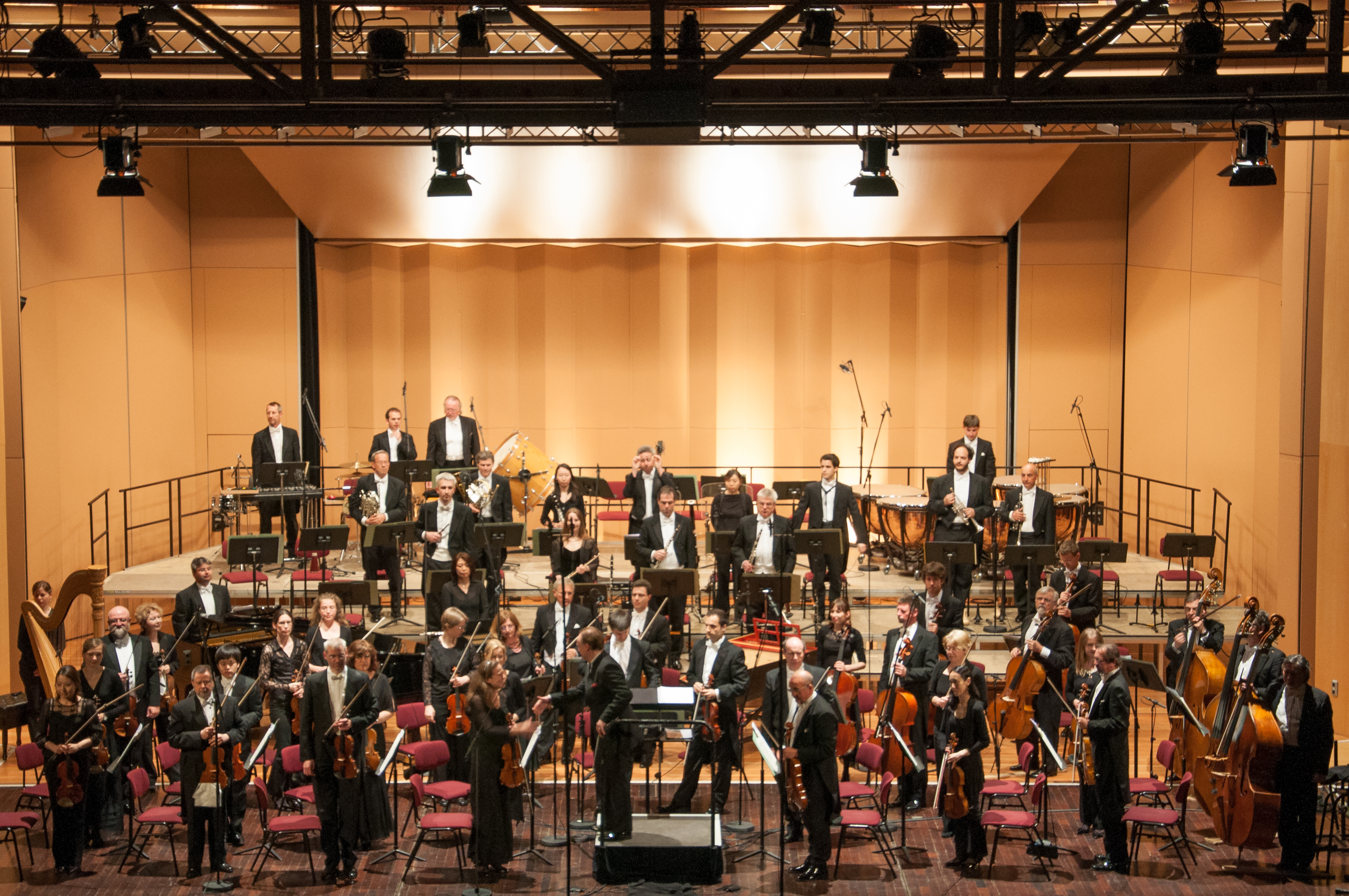
Göttingen Symphony Orchestra at the International Handel Festival Göttingen 2013

The Göttingen International Handel Festival (German, Internationale Händel-Festspiele Göttingen) is a German festival of baroque music, based in Göttingen, Germany. The festival was established in 1919 by Oskar Hagen, art historian and father of actress Uta Hagen, and gave its first performances in 1920. The festival has largely focused on the music of George Frideric Handel and has helped to revive and cultivate increased performances of Handel's music during the twentieth century. The festival involves professional musicians from throughout the world and their performances are largely concerned with employing historical baroque performance practices.

The festival produces one fully staged opera by Handel every year and several of his oratorios. In 2006, the festival created its own professional orchestra, the Festspiel Orchester Göttingen (FOG), which focuses on performing baroque music. In addition, the Festival features several performances of the chamber music of Handel and his contemporaries. The festival also features open-air classic events, late evening concerts and a host of other performances in especially distinctive surroundings, lectures, film showings and guided tours of the city.

Past artistic directors have included Fritz Lehmann, from 1934 to 1953, except for a break from 1944 through 1946 related to conflict with the Nazi authorities. John Eliot Gardiner was the festival's artistic director from 1981 to 1990. Nicholas McGegan served as the festival's artistic director from 1991 to 2011. In September 2011, Tobias Wolff assumed the post of Intendant (managing director) of the Festival, and Laurence Cummings became the new artistic director of the festival.

== Artistic directors (partial list) ==
- George Petrou (since 2021/22)
- Laurence Cummings (2011–2021)
- Nicholas McGegan (1991–2011)
- John Eliot Gardiner (1981–1990)
- Günther Weißenborn (1960-1980)
- Fritz Lehmann (1934–1944, 1946–1953)

== Opera productions (partial list) ==
- 2026: Deidamia
- 2025: Tamerlano
- 2024: Sarrasine
- 2023: Semele as a staged performance
- 2022: Giulio Cesare
- 2021: Rodelinda
- 2019: Rodrigo
- 2018: Arminio
- 2017: Lotario
- 2016: Imeneo
- 2015: Aggripina
- 2014: Faramondo
- 2013: Siroe, re di Persia
- 2012: Amadigi
