= Ottavio Dantone =

Italian conductor (born 1960)

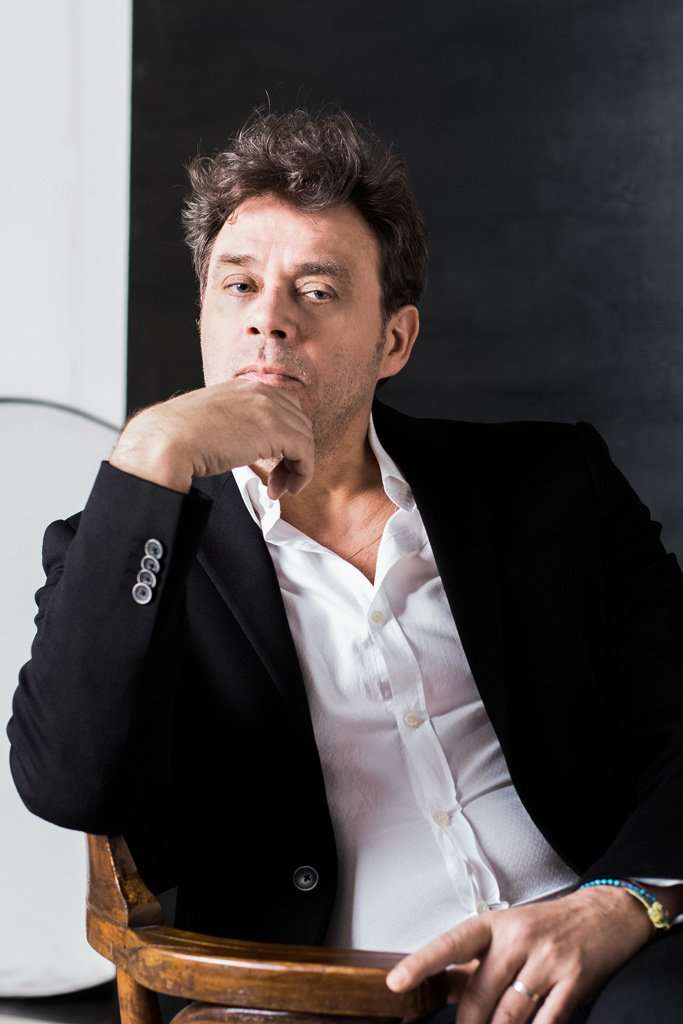
Ottavio Dantone

Ottavio Dantone (born 9 October 1960) is an Italian conductor and keyboardist (primarily harpsichord and fortepiano) particularly noted for his performances of Baroque music. He has been the music director of the Accademia Bizantina in Ravenna since 1996.

== Career ==
Dantone trained at the Conservatorio "Giuseppe Verdi" in Milan where he graduated in organ and harpsichord. In 1985 he was awarded the Basso Continuo prize at the International Paris Festival and was also a laureate in the 1986 International Bruges Festival.

Dantone made his debut as an opera conductor in 1999 with the first performance in modern times of Giuseppe Sarti's Giulio Sabino at the Teatro Alighieri in Ravenna. He made his La Scala debut in 2005 conducting Handel's Rinaldo, and would conduct performances of the same opera at Glyndebourne in 2011.

Since 2024, he has been music director of the Innsbrucker Festwochen der Alten Musik.

== Selected recordings ==
All with the Accademia Bizantina, unless otherwise stated:

Discography:

- Giuseppe Sarti: Giulio Sabino - Sonia Prina, Elena Monti, Giuseppe Filianoti, Alessandra Palomba, Donatella Lombardi, Kremena Dilcheva (2000, Bongiovanni)
- Settecento Veneziano (2001, Arts Music)
- Antonio Vivaldi: Tito Manlio – Nicola Ulivieri, Karina Gauvin, Ann Hallenberg, Marijana Mijanovic, Debora Beronesi, Barbara Di Castri (2006, Naïve)
- Antonio Vivaldi: In Furore, Laudate Pueri, Concerti Sacri – Sandrine Piau, Stefano Montanari (2006, Naïve)
- Antonio Vivaldi: L'incoronazione di Dario - Anders J. Dahlin, Sara Mingardo, Delphine Galou, Riccardo Novaro, Roberta Mameli, Lucia Cirillo, Sofia Soloviy, Giuseppina Bridelli (2018, Naive)
- Antonio Vivaldi: Il Giustino - Delphine Galou, Emőke Baráth, Silke Gäng, Veronica Cangemi, Emiliano Gonzalez Toro, Arianna Venditelli, Alessandro Giangrande, Rahel Maas (2018, Naive)
- Antonio Vivaldi: Il Tamerlano - Bruno Taddia, Filippo Mineccia, Delphine Galou, Sophie Rennert, Marina De Liso, Arianna Venditelli (2020, Naive)
- George Frideric Handel, Rinaldo - Delphine Galou, Francesca Aspromonte, Anna Maria Sarra, Raffaele Pe, Luigi De Donato, Federico Benetti, Anna Bessi (2020, HDB Sonus)
- George Frideric Handel, Serse - Arianna Vendittelli, Marina De Liso, Monica Piccinini, Delphine Galou, Francesca Aspromonte, Luigi De Donato, Biagio Pizzuti (2022, HDB Sonus)
- George Frideric Handel, Concerti Grossi Op. 6 (2022, HDB Sonus)
- George Frideric Handel, Concerti Grossi Op. 3 (2022, HDB Sonus)
- Arcangelo Corelli, Concerti Grossi Op. 6 (2023, HDB Sonus)
- Francesco Geminiani, Concerti Grossi Op. 3 (2024, HDB Sonus)
- Robert Schumann, Felix Mendelssohn, Imprinting: Mendelssohn & Schumann (2024, HDB Sonus)
- Francesco Bartolomeo Conti, Il Trionfo della Fama (2025, CPO)
- Geminiano Giacomelli, Cesare in Egitto (2025, Alpha Classics)
- Johann Sebastian Bach, Georg Philipp Telemann, Carl Philipp Emanuel Bach, Baroque Anatomy #5 (2025, HDB Sonus)

Videography:

- Il Giardino Armonico Deux: Music of the French Baroque - Giovanni Antonini (flute), Luca Pianca (lute), Enrico Onofri (violin), Vittorio Ghielmi (viola da gamba), Ottavio Dantone (harpsichord) (2003, Arthaus Musik)
- Giovanni Battista Pergolesi: Adriano in Siria, Livietta e Tracollo - Marina Comparato, Lucia Cirillo, Annamaria dell'Oste, Nicole Heaston, Stefano Ferrari, Francesca Lombardi (2010, Opus Arte)
- Giovanni Battista Pergolesi: Il Flaminio - Juan Francisco Gatell, Marina De Liso, Serena Malfi, Vito Priante, Laura Polverelli, Sonia Yoncheva, Laura Cherici (2010, Arthaus Musik)

== Sources ==
- El Diario Vasco, Recuperador de lo desconocido, 20 October 2009. Accessed 10 November 2009 (in Spanish).
- Freeman, John W., Review: Sarti: Giulio Sabino, Opera News, December 2000. Accessed 10 November 2009.
- Il Resto del Carlino, Abbado, Dantone, e fuochi d'artificio, 19 April 2007. Accessed 10 November 2009 (in Italian).
- Morreau, Annette Review:Accademia Bizantina/Dantone/Scholl, Barbican, London, The Independent, 28 November 2006. Accessed 10 November 2009.
- Osella, Leonardo, Annibale e Paisiello a Torino dopo 236 anni, ma senza Mozart; La dirigerà uno specialista come Ottavio Dantone alla testa dell’Accademia Bizantina e altri cantanti, La Stampa, 23 February 2007. Accessed 10 November 2009 (in Italian).
