= Giuliano Carmignola =

Italian violinist (born 1951)

Giuliano Carmignola (born 7 July 1951, in Treviso) is an Italian violinist. Born in Treviso, he studied with his father, then with Luigi Ferro at the Venice Conservatory and afterwards with Nathan Milstein and Franco Gulli at the Accademia Chigiana in Siena, Italy and Henryk Szeryng at the Geneva Conservatory. In 1973, he was awarded a prize in the International Paganini Competition in Genoa.

== Career ==
He began his career as a soloist under the direction of conductors such as Claudio Abbado, Eliahu Inbal, Peter Maag and Giuseppe Sinopoli, performing in prestigious concert halls. He then collaborated with Umberto Benedetti Michelangeli, Daniele Gatti, Andrea Marcon, Christopher Hogwood, Trevor Pinnock, Frans Brüggen, Paul McCreesh, Giovanni Antonini and Ottavio Dantone. Significant was his collaboration with the Virtuosi of Rome during the '70s and later with the Sonatori della gioiosa Marca, the Venice Baroque Orchestra, the Mozart Orchestra, the Orchestre des Champs-Élysées, the Kammerorchester Basel, Il Giardino Armonico, the Zurich Chamber Orchestra and the Academy of Ancient Music.

His recording has led him to collaborate with labels like Erato, Divox Antiqua, Sony and Deutsche Grammophon, with whom currently has an exclusive contract. His recording releases have won many important awards such as Diapason d'Or and Choc du Monde. Among the most recent recordings, the concertos for two violins by Vivaldi with Viktoria Mullova and the Venice Baroque Orchestra, the complete Mozart concertos with Claudio Abbado and Orchestra Mozart and Haydn violin concertos with the Orchestre des Champs-Élysées. He has taught courses at Siena's Accademia Musicale Chigiana and Lucerne's Hochschule. He was awarded the title of "Academician of the Royal Philharmonic Academy of Bologna" and "Academician of Santa Cecilia."

He plays the Stradivarius Baillot of 1732 granted him by Cassa di Risparmio in Bologna because of his stature and artistic engagement with the Orchestra Mozart.
