= Bajazet (Vivaldi opera) =

Opera by Antonio Vivaldi

- Opera by Antonio Vivaldi
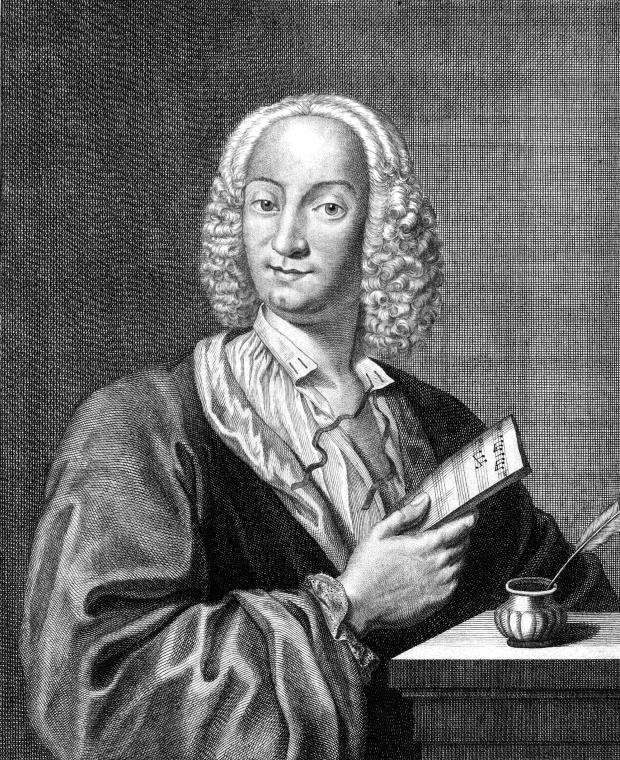
- Putative portrait of Vivaldi, 1725
- Librettist: Agostino Piovene
- Language: Italian
- Based on: Life of Beyazid I
- Premiere: 1735; Teatro Filarmonico, Verona

Bajazet (Italian pronunciation: [baʒaˈzɛt]; also called Il Tamerlano) (RV 703) is an Italian opera in 3 acts composed by Antonio Vivaldi in 1735. Its libretto was written by Agostino Piovene. It was premiered in Verona, during the Carnival season of that year. It includes a three-movement sinfonia as an introduction. The story is about the fate of Bajazet (known as Bayezid I) after being captured by Tamerlane (Timur Lenk). The famous aria "Sposa son disprezzata" is from this opera.

== Roles ==
| Role | Voice type | Premiere Cast |
|---|---|---|
| Tamerlano, the emperor of the Tartars | mezzo-soprano (en travesti) | Maria Maddalena Pieri |
| Bajazet, the emperor of the Ottoman Turks, now a prisoner to Tamerlano | baritone | Marc'Antonio Mareschi |
| Asteria, daughter of Bajazet, in love with Andronicus | contralto | Anna Girò |
| Andronicus, a prince from Greece, ally of Tamerlane | contralto castrato | Pietro Moriggi |
| Irene, princess of Tresbisond, promised in marriage to Tamerlane | contralto | Margherita Giacomazzi |
| Idaspe, friend of Andronicus | soprano castrato | Giovanni Manzoli |

== Synopsis ==
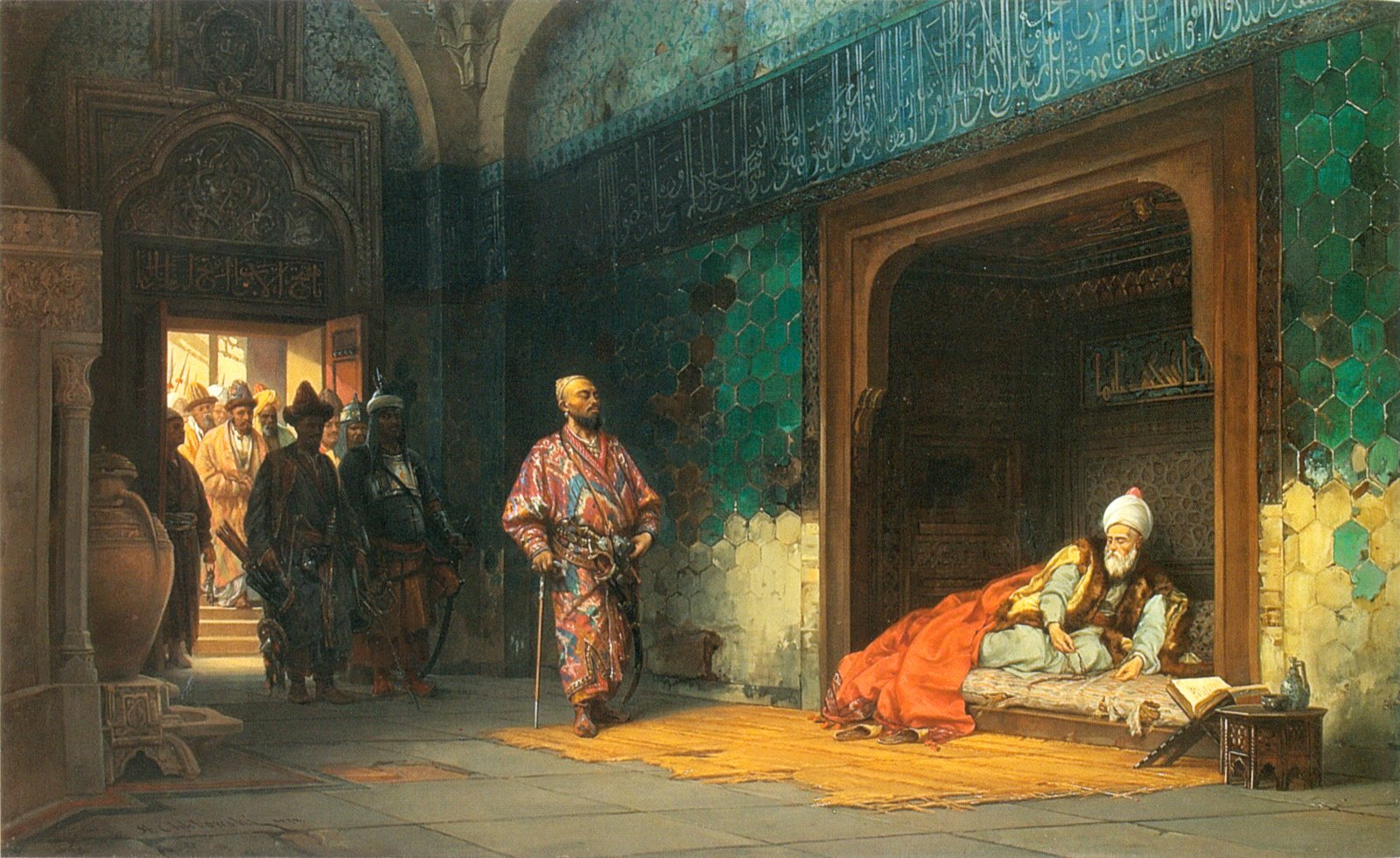
Sultan Bajazet prisoned by Tamburlaine (1878) by Stanisław Chlebowski

Act I. In garden of occupied capital of Bursa, where Tamerlane resides following the defeat of the Turks.

Scene 1 (Bajazet & Andronicus): Awaiting death, Bajazet tells Andronicus that if he weds Asteria he must hate Tamerlane.
Scene 2 (Andronicus & Idaspe). Andronicus tells Idaspe to watch Bajazet for Asteria’s sake. Idaspe warns him that Greece has already turned the Empire over to Tamerlane and that Asteria’s beauty will fade, but Andronicus could be crowned Byzantine emperor.
Scene 3 (Tamerlane & Andronicus): Tamerlane grants to Andronicus the Byzantine Empire and discloses that he is in love with Asteria. He asks Andronicus to ask her hand from Bajazet and tells him that he should marry Irene (who is betrothed to Tamerlane).
Scene 4 (Andronicus alone): Andronicus considers: He is not ungrateful to Tamerlane but wishes to have Asteria. Royal apartments for Bajazet and Asteria, guarded.
Scene 5 (Asteria): Asteria considers her dilemma—she loves Andronicus but believes he is interested only in imperial ambition.
Scene 6 (Tamerlane & Asteria); Tamerlane tells Asteria of his love and threatens her with her father’s life. He tells her that Andronicus will wed Irene and sings love aria before leaving.
Scene 7 (Andronicus, Bajazet & Asteria): Asteria reproaches Andronicus in front of her father. Andronicus begins to explain himself but Bajazet tells him that he speaks for his daughter in saying that she will refuse to marry Tamerlane and Bajazet will forfeit his head.
Scene 8 (Asteria & Andronicus): Asteria remains angry with Andronicus and tells him to carry out her father’s orders but not to speak for her. After he leaves, she wonders how she can continue to love one who is untrue to her.
Scene 9 (Irene, Andronicus & Idaspe): Irene wants to know why her proposed husband is not there to greet her. Idaspe explains that he loves another. Andronicus proposes that she go to him as Irene’s messenger. [Tamerlane does not know what she looks like.] She agrees to fight for her rights.
Scene 10 (Andronicus alone): Andronicus admits to himself that Irene is pretty and her kingdom adds to her beauty, but he is sad for Asteria. He sings aria in which he recognizes that if one does not die of grief in these circumstances it is because “either the power of death is weak; or grief is powerless.”

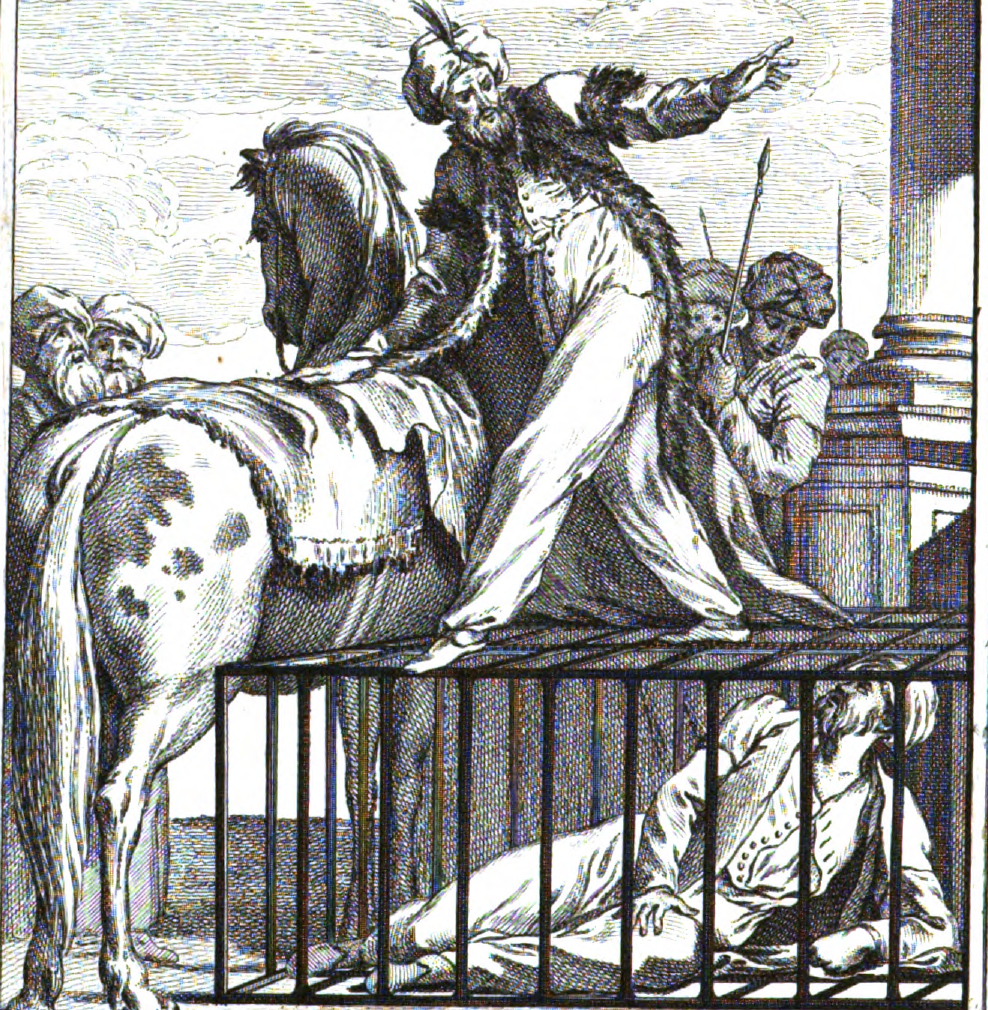
Bajazet and Tamerlan (1746) by Jean-Antoine Guer

Act 2. Open countryside with Tamerlane’s pavilions which open to show Tamerlane and Andronicus seated.

Scene 1 (Tamerlane, Andronicus, Idaspe): Tamerlane tells Andronicus that he learned of Asteria’s consent through her maid and that today both Tamerlane’s marriage to Asteria and Andronicus’s to Irene will take place.
Scene 2 (Andronicus & Idaspe): Andronicus tells Idaspe that he plans to reprove Asteria, relinquish Irene and her realm to Tamerlane, make full restitution, and offer Asteria his life and fortune. Idapse goes to inform Bajazet of Asteria’s decision.
Scene 3 (Andronicus & Asteria): Asreria berates Andronicus for not opposing Tamerlane’s offer to her. Andronicus says that he will lay down his life if that is what she wishes. She tells him it is too late, Tamerlane calls.
Scene 4 (Andronicus alone): Andronicus despairs that he has lost Asteria and will lose his life. He decides to see Bajazet. Pavilion opens to reveal Tamerlane and Asteria on cushions.
Scene 5 (Tamerlane, Asteria, Idaspe & later Irene): Idaspe announces a messenger from Irene, and Irene enters pretending to be that messenger. Tamerlane has Asteria tell her of her decision to accept Tamerlane. Irene protests and Tamerlane admits his guilt (of faithlessness) but instructs her to tell Irene that she will obtain a new husband and a kingdom that day.
Scene 6 (Asteria, Irene, & Idaspe): Asteria informs Irene’s “messenger” that she intends to displease Tamerlane and Irene might have him back.
Scene 7 (Irene & Idaspe): Irene marvels at the resolve of Asteria and says that she loves Tamerlane, despite his unfaithfulness.
Scene 8 (Andronicus & Bajazet): Andronicus informs Bajazet that he saw Asteria accept the throne. Bajazet accuses Andronicus of not fighting hard enough for her. They go to see her, while Bajazet sings of his desperation. Military camp with Tamerlane and Asteria sitting in view of the army.
Scene 9 (Tamerlane, Asteria, later Andronicus, Bajazet & Irene): Asteria complies with Tamerlane’s request that she retire to the royal quarters (with aside that she has a plan). Bajazet arrives seeking his daughter and tells Tamerlane that the blood of an Ottoman sultan will not mingle with a peasant’s. Irene (still as messenger) arrives to challenge Asteria. Tamerlane says that if she can make Asteria renounce the throne, will be Irene’s. Bajazet gives lengthy denunciation of Asteria. Then Asteria renounces the throne and reveals she was going to stab Tamerlane in bed. Tamerlane calls on guards to take Asteria and Bajazet upon whom he will exact vengeance. Tamerlane, Bajazet, Asteria and Irene sing quartet about faithlessness, cruelty mercy and death.

Act 3. Garden on the banks of the River Euphrates.

Scene 1 (Asteria & Bajazet): Bajazet shares with his daughter poison to be used when Tamerlane begins his vengeance on them.
Scene 2 (Tamerlane, Andronicus & Asteria (aside at first)): Tamerlane tells Andronicus that he will forgive Asteria if she relents. Andronicus begins to plead but Asteria enters and misunderstands his intention. Andronicus is forced to declare his love in front of Tamerlane, who in fury orders Bajazet beheaded and ASteria wedded to the meanest slave.
Scene 3 (Bajazet and the foregoing): Bajazet enters and orders his daughter to arise; she is not to bow to Tamerlane. Tamerlane becomes enraged and orders both Asteria and Bajazet to the dining hall and invites Andronicus should he wish to watch. Tamerlane sings an aria of his “hate, fury and poison for Asteria.
Scene 4 (Andronicus alone): Andronicus decides to give up his throne for Asteria, realizing that he cannot escape from “love and pity, anger and cruelty.” Dining hall with entire guard.
Scene 5 (Tamerlane, Bajzset, Andronicus, later Irene): Tamerlane informs Bajazet that he has been brought from his cell to watch. He then summons Asteria.
Scene 6 (Asteria and the foregoing): Tamerlane orders Asteria to serve him a drink. She secretly fills it with the poison Bajazet gave her. and offers it to Tamerlane.
Scene 7 (Irene with the foregoing): Irene warns Tamerlane not to take the drink, telling him that him that Asteria has poisoned it. Asteria takes the cup to drink it but Andronicus snatches it from her hand. Asteria rushes out. Tamerlane orders the guard to take her to be turned over to the mob. Bajazet promises he will come with a thousand furies to tear out Tamerlane’s heart.
Scene 8 (Bajazet leaves, the rest remain): Irene asks Tamerlane what will become of her. Tamerlane says that she will be his bride. Irene agrees to forgive his past insults to her.
Scene 9 (Idaspe and the foregoing): Idaspe advises Tamerlane that Bajazet has taken poison and is on the verge of death. Tamerlane offers Andronicus his friendship, but not Asteria.
Scene 10 (Asteria and the foregoing): Asteria arrives and announces that “he is indeed dead, you tyrant.” Her Ottoman hatred for Tamerlane has not died, however. She begs for the means to kill herself so she can join her father and sings “Stab me, beat me, kill me, fell me.”
Final Scene (Asteria leaves, but others remain): Irene and Andronicus ask Tamerlanne to have mercy on Asteria. Tamerlane says that the death of Bajazet has softened his heart. All sing of the coming peace and hope for the loss of hate among “a thousand amorous flames.”

== Sinfonia ==
- Allegro
- Andante Molto
- Allegro

== Music ==
| Act | Scene | Recitative/Aria | Characters |
|---|---|---|---|
| Act 1 | Scene 1 | Recitative: Prence Lo so: vi devo | Bajazet, Andronico |
| Act 1 | Scene 1 | Aria: Del destin non dee lagnarsi | Bajazet |
| Act 1 | Scene 2 | Recitative: Non si perda di vista | Andronico, Idaspe |
| Act 1 | Scene 2 | Aria: Nasce rosa lusinghiera | Idaspe |
| Act 1 | Scene 3 | Recitative: Principe, or ora i greci | Tamerlano, Andronico |
| Act 1 | Scene 3 | Aria: In si torbida procella | Tamerlano |
| Act 1 | Scene 4 | Recitative: Il Tartaro ama Asteria | Andronico |
| Act 1 | Scene 4 | Aria: Quel ciglio vezzosetto | Andronico |
| Act 1 | Scene 5-6 | Recitative: Or sì, fiero destino | Asteria, Tamerlano |
| Act 1 | Scene 5-6 | Aria: Vedeste mai sul prato | Tamerlano |
| Act 1 | Scene 7-8 | Recitative: Non ascolto più nulla | Bajazet, Asteria, Andronico |
| Act 1 | Scene 7-8 | Aria: Amare un'alma ingrata | Asteria |
| Act 1 | Scene 9 | Recitative: Così la sposa il Tamerlano accoglie? | Irene, Andronico, Idaspe |
| Act 1 | Scene 9 | Aria: Qual guerriero in campo armato | Irene |
| Act 1 | Scene 10 | Recitative: È bella Irene | Andronico |
| Act 1 | Scene 10 | Aria: Non ho nel sen constanza | Andronico |
| Act 2 | Scene 1 | Recitative: Amico, tengo un testimon fedele | Tamerlano, Andronico |
| Act 2 | Scene 2 | Recitative: Sarete or ostinato | Idaspe, Andronico |
| Act 2 | Scene 2 | Aria: Anche il mar par che sommerga | Idaspe |
| Act 2 | Scene 3 | Recitative: Gloria, sdegno ed amore | Asteria, Andronico |
| Act 2 | Scene 3 | Aria: Stringi le mie catene | Asteria |
| Act 2 | Scene 4 | Recitative: Ah, disperato Andronico! | Andronico |
| Act 2 | Scene 4 | Aria: La sorte mia spietata | Andronico |
| Act 2 | Scene 5 | Recitative: Signor, vergine illustre | Idaspe, Tamerlano, Irene, Asteria |
| Act 2 | Scene 5 | Aria: Cruda sorte, avverso fato! | Tamerlano |
| Act 2 | Scene 6 | Recitative: Senti, chiunque tu sia | Asteria, Irene |
| Act 2 | Scene 6 | Aria: La cervetta timidetta | Asteria |
| Act 2 | Scene 7 | Recitative: Gran cose espone Asteria | Irene, Idaspe |
| Act 2 | Scene 7 | Aria: Sposa, son disprezzata | Irene |
| Act 2 | Scene 8 | Recitative: Dov'è mia figlia, Andronico? | Bajazet, Andronico |
| Act 2 | Scene 8 | Aria: Dov'è la figla? | Bajazet |
| Act 2 | Scene 9 | Recitative: Asteria, siamo al soglio...; Accompagnato: Odi, perfida | Tamerlano, Asteria, Bajazet, Irene, Andronico |
| Act 2 | Scene 9 | Quartet: Sì crudel! questo è l'amore | Irene, Bajazet, Asteria, Tamerlano |
| Act 3 | Scene 1 | Recitative: Figlia, siam rei | Bajazet, Asteria |
| Act 3 | Scene 1 | Aria: Veder parmi, or che nel fondo | Bajazet |
| Act 3 | Scene 2-3 | Recitative: Andronico, il mio amore | Tamerlano, Andronico, Asteria, Bajazet |
| Act 3 | Scene 2-3 | Aria: Barbaro traditor | Tamerlano |
| Act 3 | Scene 4 | Recitative: Lascerò di regnare | Andronico |
| Act 3 | Scene 4 | Aria: Spesso tra vaghe rose | Andronico |
| Act 3 | Scene 5-7 | Recitative: Eccoti, Bajazette | Tamerlano, Asteria, Andronico, Bajazet, Irene |
| Act 3 | Scene 5-7 | Arioso: Verrò crudel, spietato | Bajazet |
| Act 3 | Scene 8 | Recitative: Signor, fra tante cure | Irene, Tamerlano |
| Act 3 | Scene 8 | Aria: Son tortorella | Irene |
| Act 3 | Scene 9 | Recitative: Signore, Bajazette | Idaspe, Tamerlano, Andronico |
| Act 3 | Scene 10 | Accompagnato: È morto, sì, tiranno | Asteria |
| Act 3 | Scene 10 | Aria: Svena, uccidi, abbatti, atterra | Asteria |
| Act 3 | Final Scene | Recitative: Deh, tu cauto la segui | Andronico, Irene, Tamerlano |
| Act 3 | Final Scene | Chorus: Coronata di gigli e rose | All (except Bajazet, who's dead, of course) |

== Origin of arias ==
Bajazet is a pasticcio. It was a common practice during Vivaldi's time for composers to borrow and adapt arias from other composers with their own works for an opera. Vivaldi himself composed the arias for the good characters (Bajazet, Asteria and Idaspe) and mostly used existing arias from other composers for the villains (Tamerlano, Irene, Andronico) in this opera. Some of the arias are reused from previous Vivaldi operas. The table below lists the origin of some of the arias used in Bajazet.

| Aria | Composer | Original opera | Original aria |
|---|---|---|---|
| Del destin non dee lagnarsi | Antonio Vivaldi | L'Olimpiade | Del destin non vi lagnate |
| Nasce rosa lusinghiera | Antonio Vivaldi | Giustino, also in Farnace | Senti l'aura lusinghiera / Scherza l'aura lusinghiera |
| In sì torbida procella | Geminiano Giacomelli | Alessandro Severo | In sì torbida procella (Giulia's aria, scene 12, act II) |
| Vedeste mai sul prato | Johann Adolph Hasse | Siroe re di Persia | |
| Qual guerriero in campo armato | Riccardo Broschi | Idaspe | |
| Non ho nel sen costanza | Geminiano Giacomelli | Adriano in Siria | |
| Anche il mar par che sommerga | Antonio Vivaldi | Semiramide | |
| Stringi le mie catene | Antonio Vivaldi | Griselda | |
| La sorte mia spietata | Johann Adolph Hasse | Siroe re di Persia | La sorte mia tiranna |
| La cervetta timidetta | Antonio Vivaldi | Semiramide | |
| Sposa, son disprezzata | Geminiano Giacomelli | Merope | Sposa, non mi conosci (Epidite's aria, scene 7, act III) |
| Dov'è la figlia? | Antonio Vivaldi | Motezuma | |
| Qual furore, qual affanno | Antonio Vivaldi | Orlando furioso | Nel profondo cieco mondo |
| Sì crudel! questo è l'amore (quartet) | Antonio Vivaldi | Farnace | Io crudel? giusto rigore |
| Veder parmi, or che nel fondo | Antonio Vivaldi | Farnace | Roma Invitta ma clemente |
| Spesso tra vaghe rose | Johann Adolph Hasse | Siroe re di Persia | |
| Coronata di gigli e di rose | Antonio Vivaldi | Farnace | |

== Recordings ==
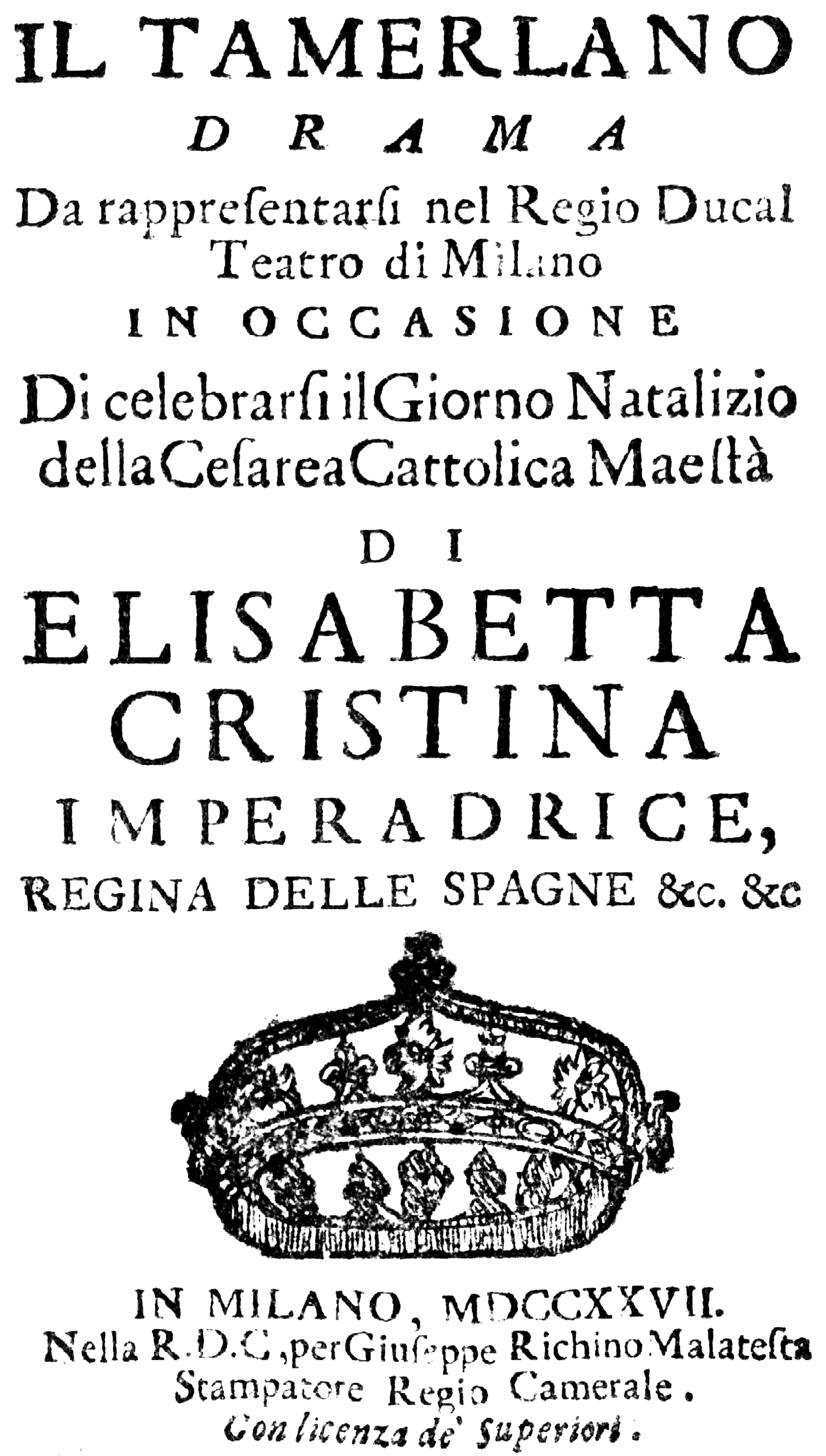
Milan 1727, when it was performed to mark the birthday of Elisabeth Christine of Brunswick-Wolfenbüttel

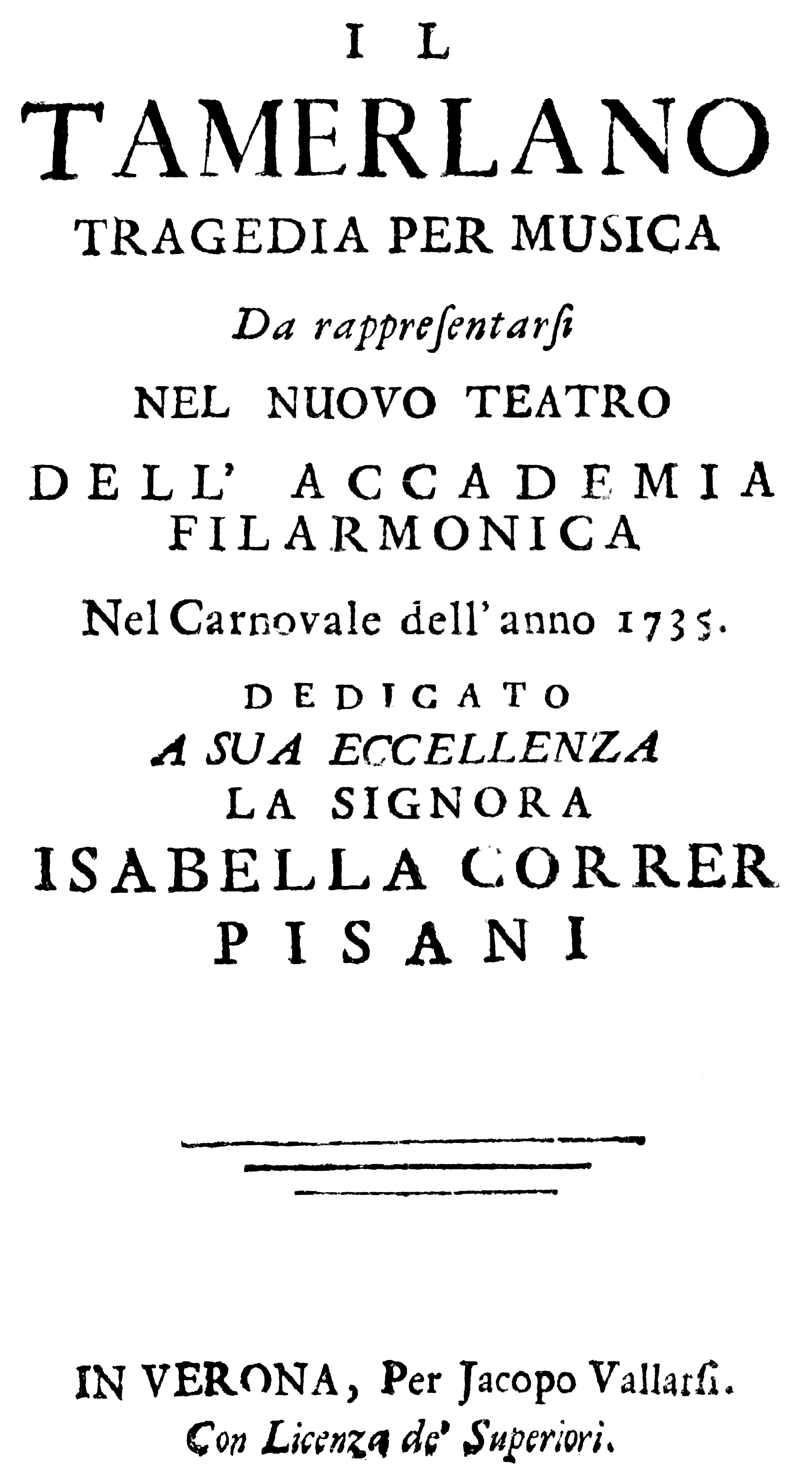
Verona 1735, when it was performed at the Teatro Filarmonico.

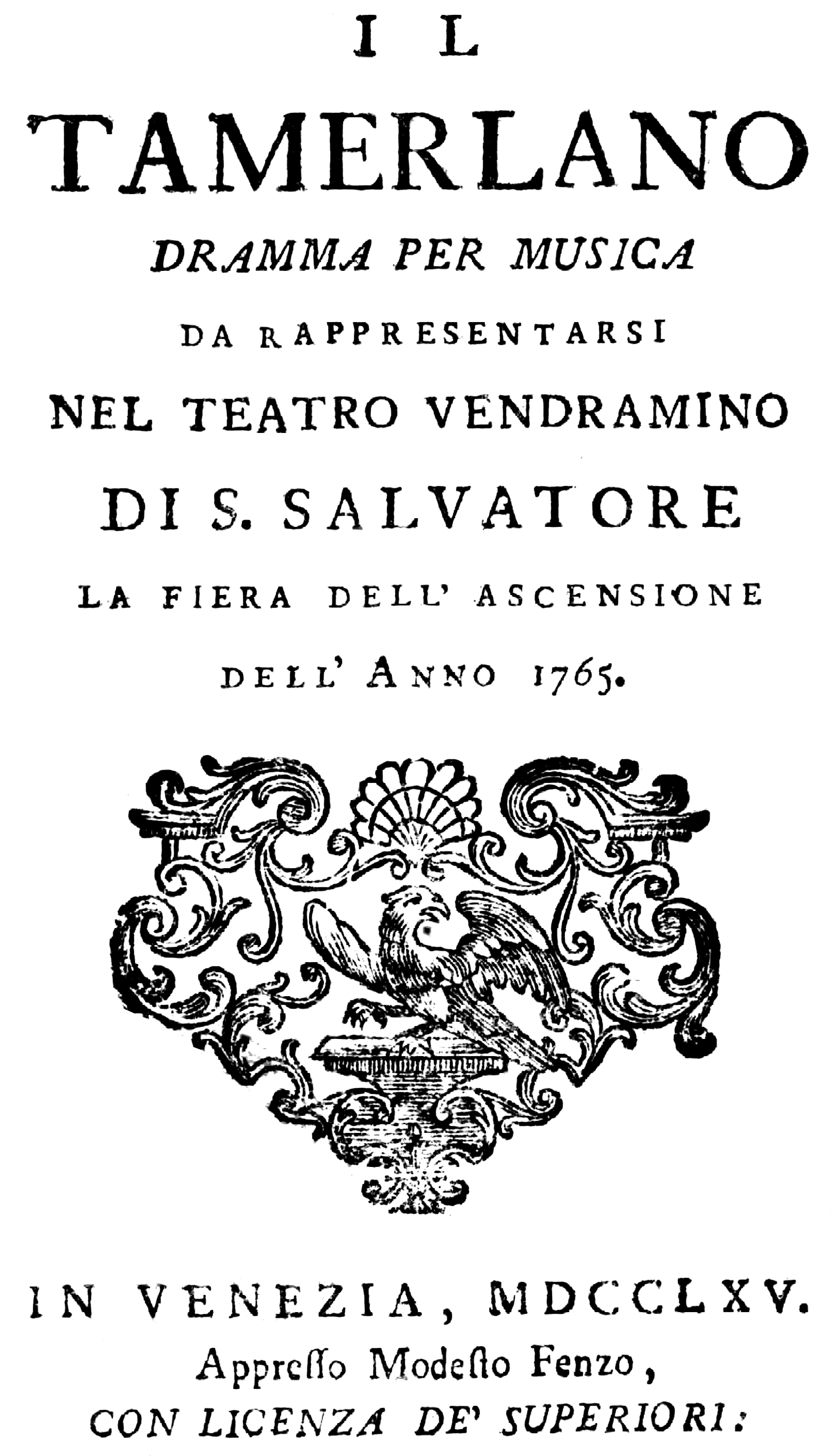
Venice 1765, when it was performed at the Vendramini Theatre on Ascension Day.

Title pages of three editions of the libretto of Bajazet (Il Tamerlano).

The first complete recording of this opera was released by Virgin Classics on 10 May 2005. Fabio Biondi conducts Europa Galante in Brussels for this recording. The singers are:

- bass-baritone Ildebrando D'Arcangelo as Bajazet
- countertenor David Daniels as Tamerlano
- mezzo-soprano Vivica Genaux as Irene
- contralto Marijana Mijanovic as Asteria
- soprano Patrizia Ciofi as Idaspe
- mezzo-soprano Elīna Garanča as Andronico

This recording received the award for Best Opera by Midem Classical Awards 2006 and shortlisted for the 48th Annual Grammy Awards 2006. Before this release, excerpts from this opera had been performed by other singers such as Cecilia Bartoli.

Pinchgut Opera's 2015 production of the opera, led by Erin Helyard, was recorded live and broadcast on ABC Classic FM. It was subsequently issued on CD on Pinchgut's own label. The cast was:

- Hadleigh Adams as Bajazet
- Christopher Lowrey as Tamerlano
- Helen Sherman as Irene
- Emily Edmonds as Asteria
- Sara Macliver as Idaspe
- Russell Harcourt as Andronico

A recording of the complete opera was released in 2020 on Naïve Classiques, featuring Accademia Bizantina conducted by Ottavio Dantone. The singers are:

- Bruno Taddia as Bajazet
- Filippo Mineccia as Tamerlano
- Sophie Rennert as Irene
- Delphine Galou as Asteria
- Arianna Venditelli as Idaspe
- Marina De Liso as Andronico
