= Sposa son disprezzata =

Aria written by Geminiano Giacomelli

"Sposa son disprezzata" ("I am wife and I am scorned") is an Italian aria written by Geminiano Giacomelli. It is used in Vivaldi's pasticcio, Bajazet.

The music for this aria was not composed by Vivaldi. The aria, originally called Sposa, non mi conosci, was taken from the Geminiano Giacomelli's opera La Merope (1734), composed before Vivaldi's pasticcio Bajazet. It was a common practice during Vivaldi's time to compile arias from other composers with one own's work for an opera. Vivaldi himself composed the arias for the good characters and mostly used existing arias from other composers for the villains in this opera. "Sposa son disprezzata" is sung by a villain character, Irene. Vivaldi has recently been attributed as the composer of the work, perhaps because Cecilia Bartoli's album "If You Love Me—'Se tu m'ami': Eighteenth-Century Italian Songs," which uses Alessandro Parisotti's 19th-century piano version, attributes the work solely to Vivaldi.

== Libretto ==
Italian

Sposa son disprezzata,
fida son oltraggiata,
cieli che feci mai?
E pur egl'è il mio cor
il mio sposo, il mio amor,
la mia speranza.

L'amo ma egl'è infedel
spero ma egl'è crudel,
morir mi lascierai?
O Dio manca il valor
valor e la costanza.

Translation in English

I am a scorned wife,
faithful, yet insulted.
Heavens, what did I do?
And yet he is my heart,
my husband, my love,
my hope.

I love him, but he is unfaithful,
I hope, but he is cruel,
will he let me die?
O God, courage is missing -
courage and constancy.

In the 1880s adaptation by Alessandro Parisotti, the second stanza is left out. This adaptation is the most widely heard, popularized by mezzo-soprano Cecilia Bartoli in the aforementioned album If You Love Me (Se tu m'ami).
