= Wratislavia Cantans =

The Andrzej Markowski International Festival Wratislavia Cantans is a music festival held every September in Wrocław and Lower Silesia, Poland, organized by the Witold Lutosławski National Forum of Music in Wrocław.

The name Wratislavia Cantans is Latin for "Singing Wrocław", and the festival from the beginning has focused primarily on presenting the beauty of the human voice. Each year, concerts attract thousands of music lovers to the concert halls of the National Forum of Music, the historic interiors of Wrocław and a dozen or so cities of Lower Silesia. In recent years, the festival has hosted, among others Philippe Herreweghe, Sir John Eliot Gardiner, Zubin Mehta, Cecilia Bartoli, Julia Lezhneva, Philippe Jaroussky, Mariusz Kwiecień, Jordi Savall, Marcel Pérès and such ensembles as: Israel Philharmonic Orchestra, Collegium Vocale Gent, Akademie für Alte Musik Berlin, Monteverdi Choir, Gabrieli Consort & Players, Il Giardino Armonico, The Swingle Singers, and English Baroque Soloists. Since 2008, Andrzej Kosendiak has been the festival's general director, and since 2013, the Italian conductor and instrumentalist Giovanni Antonini has been the artistic director.

== Festival venues ==
From the beginning, the festival's events take place in the historic interiors of Wrocław, such as the churches: Basilica of St Elizabeth, Cathedral of St Mary Magdalene, Cathedral of St John the Baptist, University Church of the Holy Name of Jesus, Evangelical Augsburg Church of Divine Providence, Collegiate Church of the Holy Cross and Saint Bartholomew, and the White Stork Synagogue, as well as the Town Hall and university rooms (Aula Leopoldina, Oratorium Marianum). In the past, concert venues also included the Radio Wrocław Concert Hall and the hall of the former Wrocław Philharmonic.

Apart from Wrocław, Wratislavia Cantans concerts take place in the towns of Lower Silesia and Wielkopolska province, so far these have been: Bardo, Bielawa, Bolesławiec, Brzeg, Dzierżoniów, Głogów, Jelcz-Laskowice, Jelenia Góra, Kalisz, Kamieniec Ząbkowicki, Kłodzko, Krotoszyn, Krzeszów, Legnica, Lubiąż, Lubomierz, Milicz, Oleśnica, Oława, Polkowice, Prochowice, Strzegom, Szczawno-Zdrój, Syców, Środa Śląska, Świdnica, Trzebnica, Wałbrzych, Zgorzelec, and Żmigród.

== Festival posters ==
The authors of festival posters have been well-known Polish artists, such as Rafał Olbiński, Eugeniusz Get-Stankiewicz, Lech Majewski, and Michał Batory.

== Membership in international organizations ==
In 1978, the Wratislavia Cantans festival became a member of the European Festivals Association (EFA), which officially gave the event an international rank (although it has hosted foreign artists almost from the beginning). In 1998, the festival joined the International Society for the Performing Arts (ISPA). The festival also belongs to Music Masters on Air (MusMA) network. From 2015–2019 Wratislavia Cantans was awarded the Europe for Festivals, Festivals for Europe Label (EFFE Label).

== History ==
Wratislavia Cantans was established by Andrzej Markowski, a composer and conductor, in 1966 as an oratorio and cantata festival. Markowski was director of the Wrocław Philharmonic from 1965, and the Philharmonic was the host of this event. He served as festival director for eleven years. From 1978 to 1996, Tadeusz Strugała was the head of the festival, and added new elements to its programme: ethnic music and music of various religions, art exhibitions accompanying concerts, musical screenings, countertenor tournaments at the Silesian Piasts Castle in Brzeg, festival academies run by scholars, as well as academic sessions and a course on interpreting oratorio music.

From 1991, the main organizer of the festival was the Culture and Art Centre in Wrocław. From 1995–1998 the festival had a subtitle “Music and Fine Arts”. In 1996, the festival was organized by the “Wratislavia Cantans” State Institution of Culture, the International Music and Fine Arts Festival, and the management was divided between two persons: the general director and the artistic director. Lidia Geringer de Oedenberg became the general director, and artistic directors during her tenure were: from 1997 Ewa Michnik, from 2002 Mariusz Smolij, and from 2004 Jan Latham Koenig. Lidia Geringer de Oedenberg initiated cooperation with many Lower Silesian towns to organize festival concerts outside Wrocław.

In 2005, Andrzej Kosendiak became the festival’s general director and Paul McCreesh the artistic director. In 2014, the institutions of the International Festival Wratislavia Cantans and the Witold Lutosławski Philharmonic in Wrocław were merged into one cultural institution, Witold Lutosławski National Forum of Music, who has since been the festival’s host.

Since 2013, the artistic director of Wratislavia has been Giovanni Antonini, an Italian virtuoso and conductor, founder and director of the Baroque orchestra Il Giardino Armonico. Under his leadership, the following editions of the festival have been held so far: “Journey to Italy” (2013), “From Darkness to Light” (2014), “Long Live Wratislavia!” (2015; 50th anniversary edition), “Recitar Cantando” (2017) and “Liberation” (2018). In 2019, the festival took place under the motto “South”.
