= Giulio Sabino =

1781 opera seria by Giuseppe Sarti

- Dramma per musica by Giuseppe Sarti
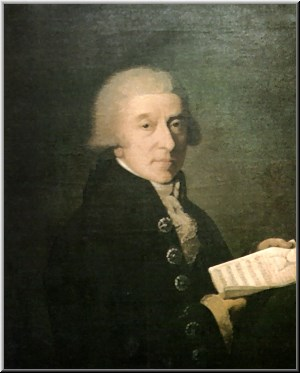
- Giuseppe Sarti
- Librettist: Pietro Giovannini
- Language: Italian
- Premiere: 3 January 1781; Teatro San Benedetto, Venice

Giulio Sabino ("Julius Sabinus") is a dramma per musica (opera seria) in three acts by Giuseppe Sarti. The libretto was by Pietro Giovannini.

The opera, staged in six or seven European countries at the end of the 18th century, was the subject of a parody in Antonio Salieri's 1786 work Prima la musica e poi le parole.

== Performance history ==
It was first performed at the Teatro San Benedetto in Venice on 3 January 1781. The opera was revived at the Teatro Comunale Alighieri in Ravenna in 1999 (see recording section below).

== Roles ==
Roles, voice types, premiere cast
Role	Voice type	Premiere cast, 3 January 1781 Conductor: Unknown
Annio	tenor	Giuseppe Desirò
Arminio	alto castrato	Pietro Gherardi
Epponina, Sabino's wife	soprano	Anna Pozzi
Sabino	soprano castrato	Gaspare Pacchierotti
Tito	tenor	Giacomo Panati
Voadice	soprano	Felice Zannotti

== Synopsis ==
The opera is about the triumph of conjugal love. It is set in 1st-century Gaul in the time of the Emperor Vespasian.

== Recording ==
There is a recording made in Ravenna in 1999 by the Accademia Bizantina under Ottavio Dantone with Alessandra Palomba (Arminio), Sonia Prina (Giulio Sabino), Donatella Lombardi (Voadice), Elena Monti (Epponina), Giuseppe Filianoti (Tito), Kremena Dilcheva (Annio) (Bongiovanni CD 1173251).
