= Accademia Bizantina =

Baroque music ensemble

Accademia Bizantina is an ensemble that specialises in the historically informed performance of 17th- and 18th-century music on period instruments, although its repertoire also encompasses classical and romantic works, the music of Monteverdi, and compositions by certain late Renaissance composers.

== History ==
Founded in Ravenna in 1984 "with the programmatic intent of making music like a great quartet", the group uses period instruments and adheres to a philosophy of historically informed performance.

In 1989, during the recording of Corelli’s Opera Omnia (conducted by the then conductor and violinist Carlo Chiarappa), Ottavio Dantone joined the ensemble as a permanent member on the harpsichord. In 1996, Dantone was appointed musical and artistic director of Accademia Bizantina; since then, the ensemble has focused entirely on the Baroque repertoire.

In 1999, Accademia Bizantina and its conductor Ottavio Dantone brought Giuseppe Sarti’s opera Giulio Sabino to the stage for the first time in the modern era at the Teatro Alighieri in Ravenna. Since then, Accademia Bizantina has specialised in the performance of Baroque opera and oratorio, presenting not only the most significant works in this repertoire but also rediscovering pieces that had never been performed in modern times.

In 2011, violinist and violist Alessandro Tampieri became concertmaster of Accademia Bizantina.

In 2013, Accademia Bizantina moved its headquarters to the town of Bagnacavallo, where the orchestra has recorded numerous albums, held concerts and hosted events at the Teatro Goldoni, including, since 2016, the early and Baroque music festival Libera La Musica, curated by Accademia Bizantina and Ottavio Dantone.

In 2021, Accademia Bizantina was a nominee for the Gramophone's Orchestra of the Year award.

In 2024, the ensemble released the album Imprinting, a recording of Mendelssohn’s "Italian" Symphony and Schumann’s "Rhenish" Symphony, with which Accademia Bizantina launched a series of recordings and concerts exploring the musical repertoire of the nineteenth century, highlighting the links between Baroque works and the music of subsequent centuries, to "explore the language of the Romantic period, considering on the one hand the aesthetic and philosophical changes taking place in the first half of the nineteenth century and, on the other, the tradition of expressive gestures and attitudes from the previous century that were still part of the new artistic sensibility".

Since 2024, Accademia Bizantina has been the resident orchestra at the Innsbrucker Festwochen der Alten Musik, Innbruck's early music festival, where the ensemble continues its exploration of the Baroque repertoire and, in particular, the rediscovery of works that are less well-known or previously unheard by modern audiences.

Over the years, Accademia Bizantina has achieved considerable critical acclaim for the rigour of its performances, and its regular participation in major European festivals testifies to the group's importance and reputation. The international theatres and festivals where Accademia Bizantina has performed include Carnegie Hall and Lincoln Centre (New York City), Wigmore Hall and the Barbican Centre (London), the Théâtre des Champs-Élysées (Paris) and the Royal Opera (Versailles); Concertgebouw (Amsterdam), Bozar (Brussels), Pierre Boulez Saal / Staatsoper (Berlin), Kölner Philharmonie, Elbphilharmonie Hamburg, ENCPA Beijing, Shanghai Concert Hall, Walt Disney Concert Hall (Los Angeles), Theater an der Wien (Vienna), Wiener Konzerthaus, CNDM Madrid, Auditorium Parco della Musica in Rome.

Accademia Bizantina has released over forty CDs on prestigious labels such as Decca, Naïve, Alpha Classics and others.

== Recordings ==
- 1991 – Franz Schubert, Konzertstück, Polonaise, Rondo, (Europa Musica)
- 1995 – Ottorino Respighi, Antiche danze ed arie per liuto, III Suite, (Denon)
- 2000 – Antonio Vivaldi, Il Cimento dell'Armonia e dell'Invenzione, (ARTS)
- 2000 – Giuseppe Sarti, Giulio Sabino (Bongiovanni)
- 2001 – Alessandro Scarlatti, Concerti grossi. Cello sonatas (ARTS)
- 2001 – Settecento Veneziano (ARTS)
- 2002 – Antonio Vivaldi, L'Estro Armonico (ARTS)
- 2003 – Henry Purcell, The Fairy Queen, with New English Voices (ARTS)
- 2003 – Arcadia, with Andreas Scholl (Decca)
- 2004 – Alessandro Scarlatti, Il Giardino di Rose (Decca)
- 2005 – Arcangelo Corelli, Violin Sonatas op. 5 (ARTS)
- 2005 – Seicento Italiano (ARTS)
- 2005 – Arias for Senesino, with Andreas Scholl (Decca)
- 2006 – Antonio Vivaldi, In furore, Laudate pueri e concerti sacri, with Sandrine Piau (Naïve)
- 2006 – Antonio Vivaldi, Tito Manlio (Naïve)
- 2007 – George Frideric Handel, Il duello amoroso with Andreas Scholl (Harmonia Mundi)
- 2008 – Johann Sebastian Bach, Harpsichord Concertos (Decca "L'Oiseau Lyre")
- 2008 – Antonio Vivaldi, Arie Ritrovate, with Sonia Prina (Naïve)
- 2009 – George Frideric Handel, Organ Concertos, op. 4 (Decca "L'Oiseau Lyre")
- 2009 – George Frideric Handel, Between Heaven & Earth, with Sandrine Piau, (Naïve)
- 2010 – Franz Joseph Haydn, Concertos for Harpsichord & Violin (Decca "L'Oiseau Lyre")
- 2010 – Henry Purcell, O solitude, with Andreas Scholl (Decca)
- 2011 – Johann Sebastian Bach, Sinfonia (Decca)
- 2012 – Antonio Vivaldi, Con moto, with Giuliano Carmignola (Archiv Produktion)
- 2013 – Johann Sebastian Bach, Concertos, with Viktoria Mullova, violin (Onyx Classics)
- 2014 – Antonio Vivaldi, L’Incoronazione di Dario (Naïve)
- 2015 – Franz Joseph Haydn, Symphonies 78, 79, 80, 81 (Decca)
- 2016 – Wolfgang Amadeus Mozart, Mozart 225: Serenades & Divertimenti (Decca)
- 2017 – Johann Sebastian Bach, The Art of Fugue (Decca)
- 2017 – Antonio Vivaldi, Agitata, with Delphine Galou (Alpha Classics)
- 2018 – Antonio Vivaldi, Concerti per Archi III e Concerti per Viola d’Amore (Naïve)
- 2018 – Antonio Vivaldi, Il Giustino (Naïve)
- 2019 – Antonio Vivaldi, Musica sacra per alto, with Delphine Galou (Naïve)
- 2019 – Antonio Vivaldi, Arie e cantate per contralto, with Delphine Galou (Naïve)
- 2019 – Antonio Vivaldi, Concerti per violino VII "Per il castello" (Naïve)
- 2020 – Antonio Vivaldi, Il Tamerlano (Naïve)
- 2020 – George Frideric Handel, Rinaldo (HDB Sonus)
- 2021 – Pietro Antonio Cesti, La Dori (CPO)
- 2022 – Claudio Monteverdi, Il ritorno di Ulisse in patria (Dynamic)
- 2022 – George Frideric Handel, Serse (HDB Sonus)
- 2022 – George Frideric Handel, Concerti Grossi Op. 6 (HDB Sonus)
- 2022 – George Frideric Handel, Concerti Grossi Op. 3 (HDB Sonus)
- 2023 – Arcangelo Corelli, Concerti Grossi Op. 6 (HDB Sonus)
- 2024 – Invocazioni Mariane, con Andreas Scholl (Naïve)
- 2024 – Imprinting: Mendelssohn & Schumann (HDB Sonus)
- 2024 – Francesco Geminiani, Concerti Grossi Op. 3 (HDB Sonus)
- 2025 – Francesco Bartolomeo Conti, Il Trionfo della Fama (CPO)
- 2025 – Geminiano Giacomelli, Cesare in Egitto (Alpha Classics)
- 2025 – J.S. Bach, C.P.E. Bach, G.P. Telemann, Baroque Anatomy No. 5 – The Eye (HDB Sonus)
- 2026 – Imprinting: Mozart & Haydn (HDB Sonus)
