= Giustino (Vivaldi) =

Opera by Antonio Vivaldi

Il Giustino
- Opera by Antonio Vivaldi
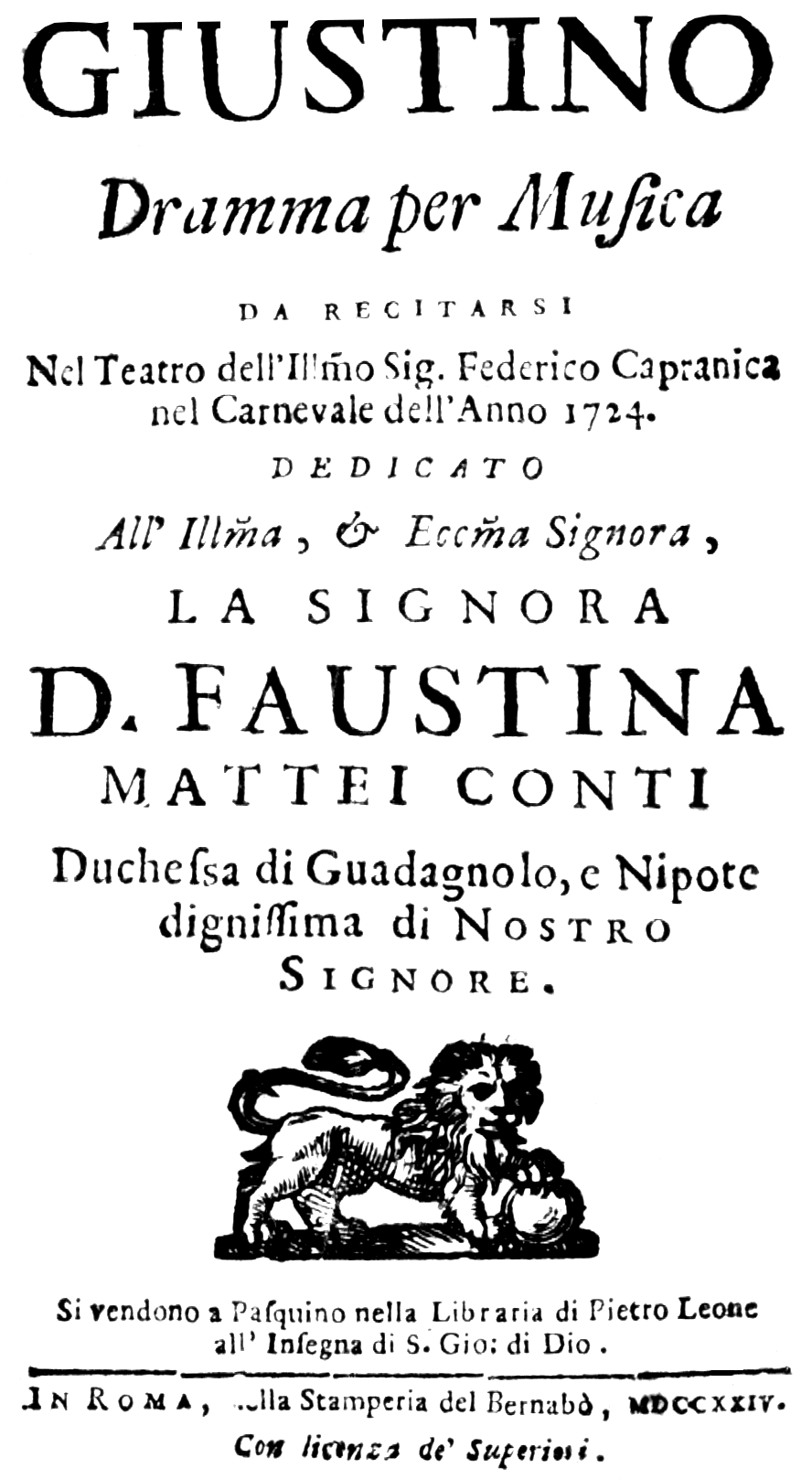
- Vivaldi - Il Giustino - title page of the libretto - Rome 1724
- Librettist: Nicolò Beregan
- Language: Italian
- Premiere: 23 January 1724; Teatro Capranica, Rome

Il Giustino RV 717 is a 1724 opera by Vivaldi set to a libretto by Nicolò Beregan, originally used for the 1683 opera of the same name by Giovanni Legrenzi, and also later set by Albinoni and Handel. The opera was composed for the 1724 carnival season in Rome and premiered at the Teatro Capranica.

== Roles ==
Roles, voice types
Role	Voice type
Anastasio, Emperor of Byzantium	soprano
Empress Arianna	soprano
Leocasta, Anastasio's sister	soprano
Giustino	alto
Vitaliano, Tyrant of Asia Minor	tenor
Andronico, brother of Vittaliano	alto
Amanzio, General of the Imperial Troops	tenor
Polidarte, captain of Vitelliano's guards	tenor
The Goddess Fortune	soprano

== Music ==
The aria of Anastasio, Vedrò con mio diletto, has become known as a recital piece and sung at concerts and on recordings by countertenors such as Philippe Jaroussky and Jakub Józef Orliński and by contraltos such as Sonia Prina. The Sinfonia of Act I, Scene V, is also used by Vivaldi as the main motif of the first movement of La Primavera ("Spring") from his concerti The Four Seasons.

== Modern performances ==
The opera was revived in modern times in 1985 in a production directed by Alan Curtis and performed at the Teatro Olimpico in Vicenza, at the Opéra Royal of the Palace of Versailles, and at the Teatro La Fenice in Venice. According to data reported by Le magazine de l'opéra baroque, a subsequent performance in concert form was held at the Mégaron Musikis in Athens in 2007, while a further revival on stage, for a total of twelve performances, took place, between 2008 and 2009, at the Oldenburgisches Staatstheater.

In July 2018, a concert performance was given at the Festival International d'Opéra Baroque de Beaune — with the Accademia Bizantina conducted by Ottavio Dantone. In August 2018, a full costume version of Il Giustino, directed by Deda Cristina Colonna and conducted by Peter Spissky and the Camerata Øresund, figured as one of the central pieces in the Næstved Early Music Festival.

In 2022 a new production was given at Drottningholm Palace Theatre and this was broadcast by OperaVision in December 2023.

== Recordings ==
- Vivaldi - Il Giustino. Dominique Labelle, Marina Comparato, Francesca Provvisionato, Geraldine McGreevy. Leonardo De Lisi, Laura Cherici. Il Complesso Barocco dir. Alan Curtis Virgin Classics 2002
- Vivaldi - Il Giustino. Delphine Galou, Emőke Baráth, Verónica Cangemi, Emiliano Gonzales Toro, Arianna Vendittelli, Accademia Bizantina, Ottavio Dantone Naive 2018

== See also ==
- List of operas by Antonio Vivaldi
