= Giustino (Handel) =

1737 opera by Handel

George Frideric Handel

Giustino ("Justin", HWV 37) is an opera seria in three acts by George Frideric Handel. The opera was first given at the Covent Garden Theatre in London on 16 February 1737. The Italian-language libretto was adapted from Charles VI's court poet Pietro Pariati's libretto for Giustino (1711), after the much older original libretto of Nicolò Beregan (1682). The libretto had already been adapted by many composers including Vivaldi's Giustino of 1724 and Tomaso Albinoni's lost opera of 1711.

== Background ==
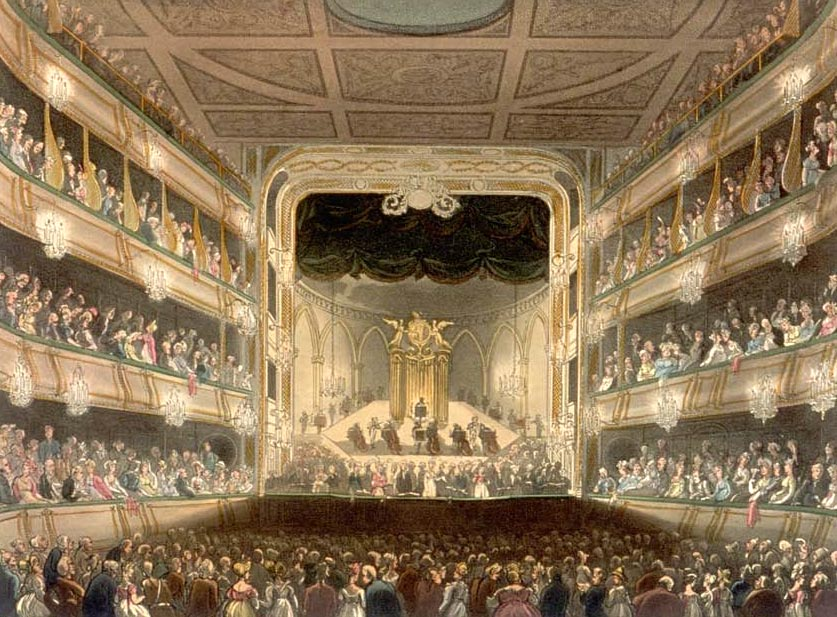
Covent Garden Theatre, location of first performance of Giustino

By the 1736–37 season in London, the German-born Handel was presenting both operas he had composed in Italian, as he had done for more than twenty years, and oratorio in English, which was a newer form for him. Giustino was one of three new operas composed by Handel that season. In addition he revived earlier operas and oratorios and presented two new oratorios.

In the middle of all this work, Handel suffered an illness which temporarily left his right hand paralyzed, as reported in the London Evening Post on 14 May 1737: "The ingenious Mr. Handel is very much indispos'd, and it's thought with a Pareletick Disorder, he having at present no Use of his Right Hand, which, if he don't regain, the Publick will be depriv'd of his fine Compositions."

Handel led the performances of his operas and oratorios from the keyboard and often played organ concertos between the acts; nevertheless he was absent from the theatre while he recovered, which he did fairly speedily although he suffered occasional relapses of this ailment for the rest of his life.

Of the three new operas Handel presented that season, Giustino was the most successful with audiences.

== Roles ==
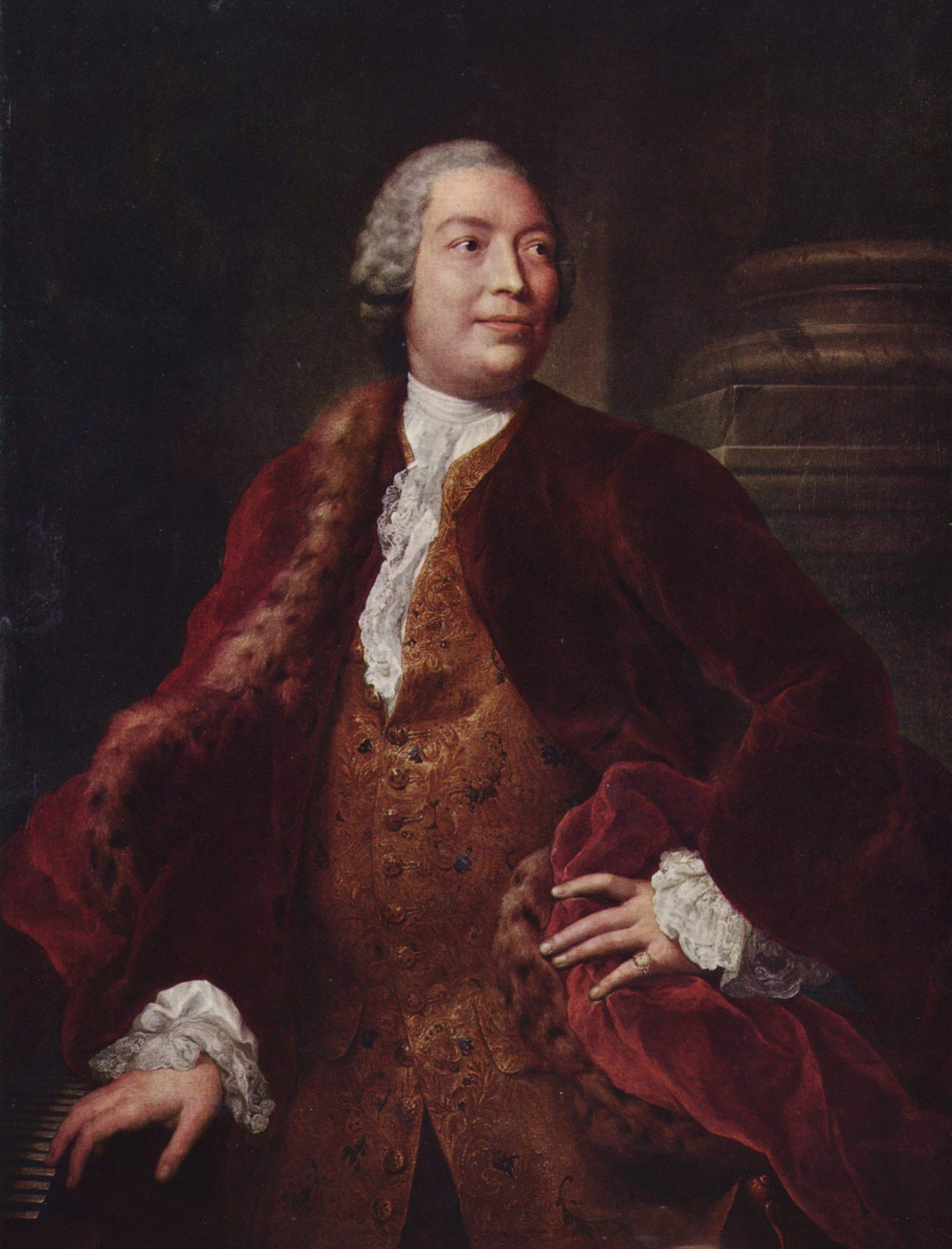
Domenico Annibali, creator of the role of Giustino

Roles, voice types, and premiere cast
Role	Voice type	Premiere cast, 16 February 1737
Giustino	alto castrato	Domenico Annibali
Anastasio	soprano castrato	Gioacchino Conti ("Gizziello")
Arianna, widow of the emperor	soprano	Anna Maria Strada del Pò
Leocasta	contralto	Francesca Bertolli
Amanzio	contralto	Maria Caterina Negri
Vitaliano	tenor	John Beard
Polidarte	bass	Henry Theodore Reinhold
La Fortuna	treble	William Savage

== Synopsis ==
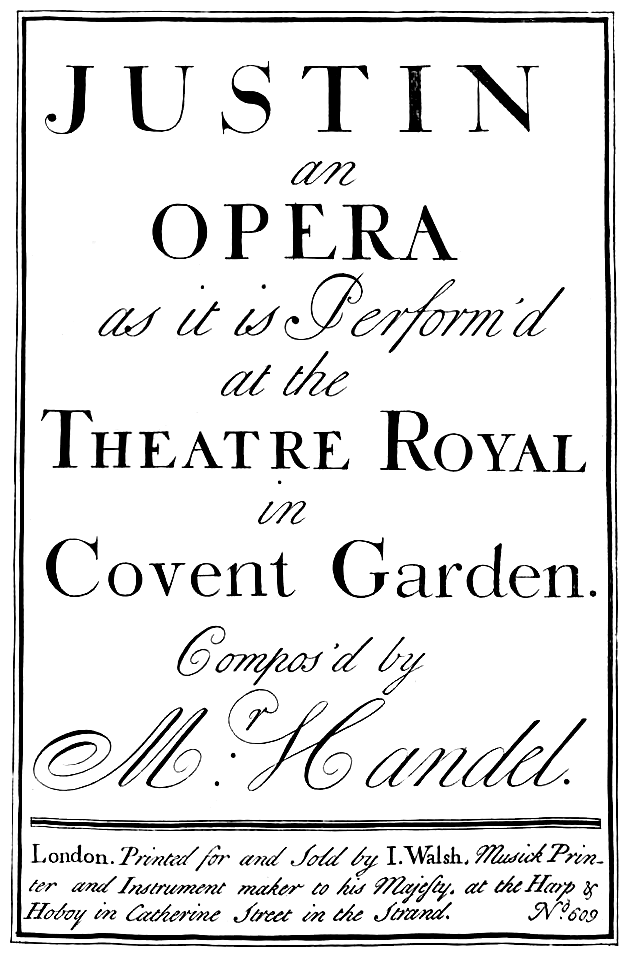
Title page of the score, London 1737

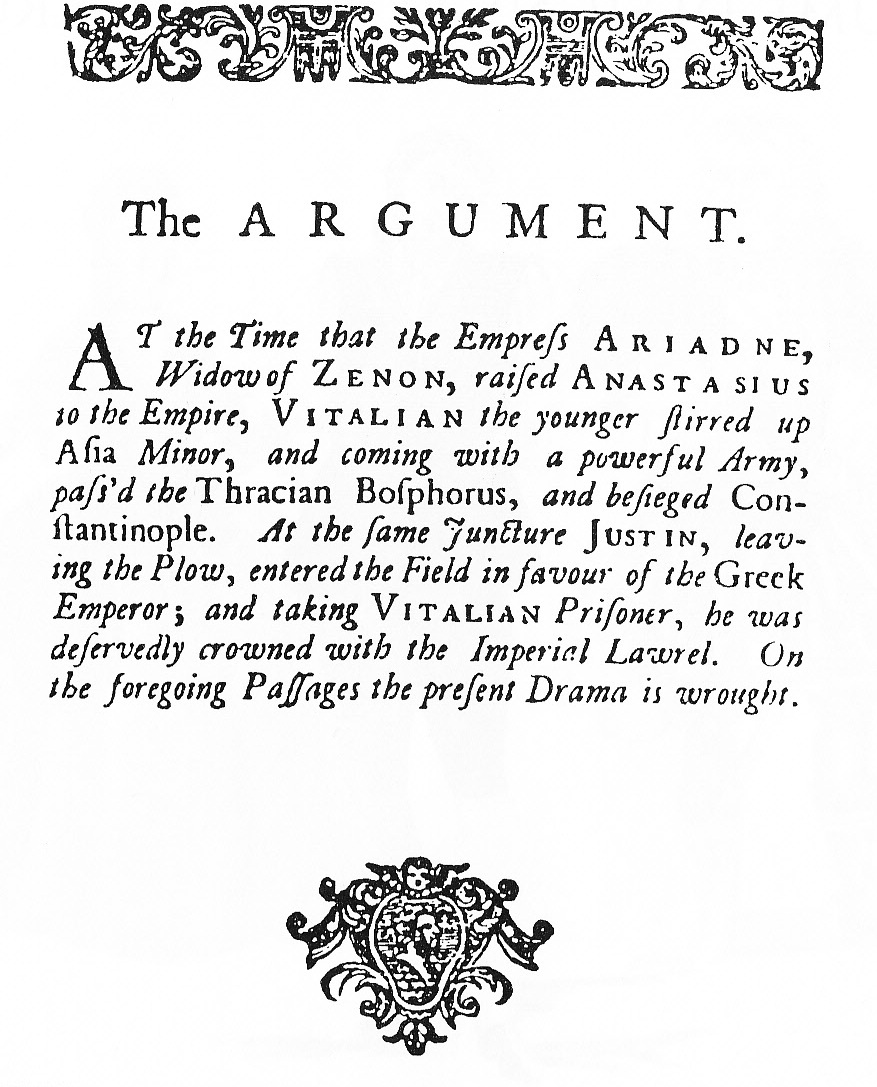
Introduction, 1737

Time: early 6th century

Place: the Byzantine Empire

=== Act 1 ===
In Constantinople, widowed Empress Arianna is celebrating her marriage to her new husband Anastasio when they receive news that they are threatened by a rebellion. Vitaliano has raised an army and is demanding that Arianna marry him instead and place him on the throne by her side. Anastasio sends a defiant message and sets off to fight the rebel. Arianna determines to follow her husband.

In a rural setting, the ploughboy Giustino is working his fields when he falls asleep and has a vision of great fortune awaiting him. He wakes to see a maiden being chased by a wild bear and rescues her. The maiden turns out to be Princess Leocasta, sister of Anastasio, and, much smitten by her rescuer Giustino, she invites him to the palace where he is acclaimed as a hero and sent to help Empress Arianna and her new husband against the rebel Vitaliano.

Arianna has been taken prisoner by the rebels and is brought to Vitaliano, who demands that she marry him. When she refuses, Vitaliano condemns her to be thrown to the sea monster who has been ravaging the country. Arianna laments her fate but swears she will remain faithful to Anastasio.

=== Act 2 ===
Giustino and Anastasio have joined forces to try to rescue Arianna, but the ship carrying them on this mission is wrecked in a storm. They crawl to the shore and take refuge in a nearby hut.

Meanwhile, Vitaliano gives the captive Arianna one last chance to accept his hand and save her life, but she refuses. He therefore chains her to a rock by the sea to be devoured by the sea monster and leaves her to her fate. As the monster rises from the sea, Giustino rushes in and slays it. Arianna and Anastasio are delighted to be reunited and are led to safety. Vitaliano, now regretting condemning Arianna to such a cruel death, returns but finds only the dead sea monster. He decides to seek Arianna.

Leocasta, awaiting the others in the palace garden, expresses her love for Giustino. He himself appears, dragging in Vitaliano, whom he has captured. Arianna and Anastasio express their gratitude to Giustino and send him back into battle to defeat the rebels. General of their armies Amanzio grows jealous of the upstart Giustino and the glory he is winning for himself. Vitaliano begs Arianna for one kind look before he dies, but Arianna repulses him and orders him to prison to await his execution.

=== Act 3 ===
Vitaliano manages to escape from prison. General Amanzio takes a sash covered in jewels that belonged to Vitaliano and gives it to Anastasio, suggesting to him that his wife is betraying him with Giustino. Anastasio gives the sash to Arianna, who bestows it on Giustino in gratitude for saving her life. When Anastasio hears of this, both Arianna and Giustino are banished.

Wandering in the countryside, Giustino bemoans his betrayal by fortune and falls asleep. Vitaliano chances to find him and is about to murder him in his sleep when a nearby mountain splits in two and the voice of his dead father warns Vitaliano that Giustino is in fact his long lost brother, a fact which is confirmed by a birthmark in the shape of a star on Giustino's arm. Giustino and Vitaliano now swear friendship and form a pact to save the kingdom from wicked General Amanzio.

Back at the palace, Amanzio has defeated Anastasio and placed himself on the throne. Anastasio, Arianna and Princess Leocasta are in chains but Giustino rushes in, defeats Amanzio and sends him off to be executed. Anastasio is restored to the throne with his wife, begging her pardon for having doubted her fidelity, and Giustino pleads for the now repentant Vitaliano to be forgiven. Anastasio grants this request and gives Giustino the hand of his sister Leocasta in marriage. All celebrate such a happy turn of events.

== Performance history ==
The opera had eight further performances in its original London season. It was also performed in Braunschweig in August 1741. The first modern performance took place in Abingdon, England on 21 April 1963.

The first London performance since Handel's time was presented in November 1983. With the revival of interest in Baroque music and historically informed musical performance since the 1960s, Giustino, like all Handel operas, receives performances at festivals and opera houses today. Among other performances, the opera was staged at the Theater an der Wien in December 2019.

== Musical features ==
A number of the extended da capo arias feature oboe obbligato, specially written for the virtuoso instrumentalist Giuseppe Sammartini.

The opera is scored for two recorders, bass flute, two oboes, bassoon, two horns, two trumpets, strings and continuo (cello, lute, harpsichord).

== Recordings ==
- (1994, Göttingen). Michael Chance, Dorothea Röschmann, Dawn Kotoski, Jennifer Lane, Mark Padmore, Drew Minter, Dean Ely, Juliana Gondek, Freiburger Barockorchester cond. Nicholas McGegan. Harmonia Mundi France HMU 907130.32
