= Kammerorchester Basel =

Swiss orchestra

- Conductorless chamber orchestra
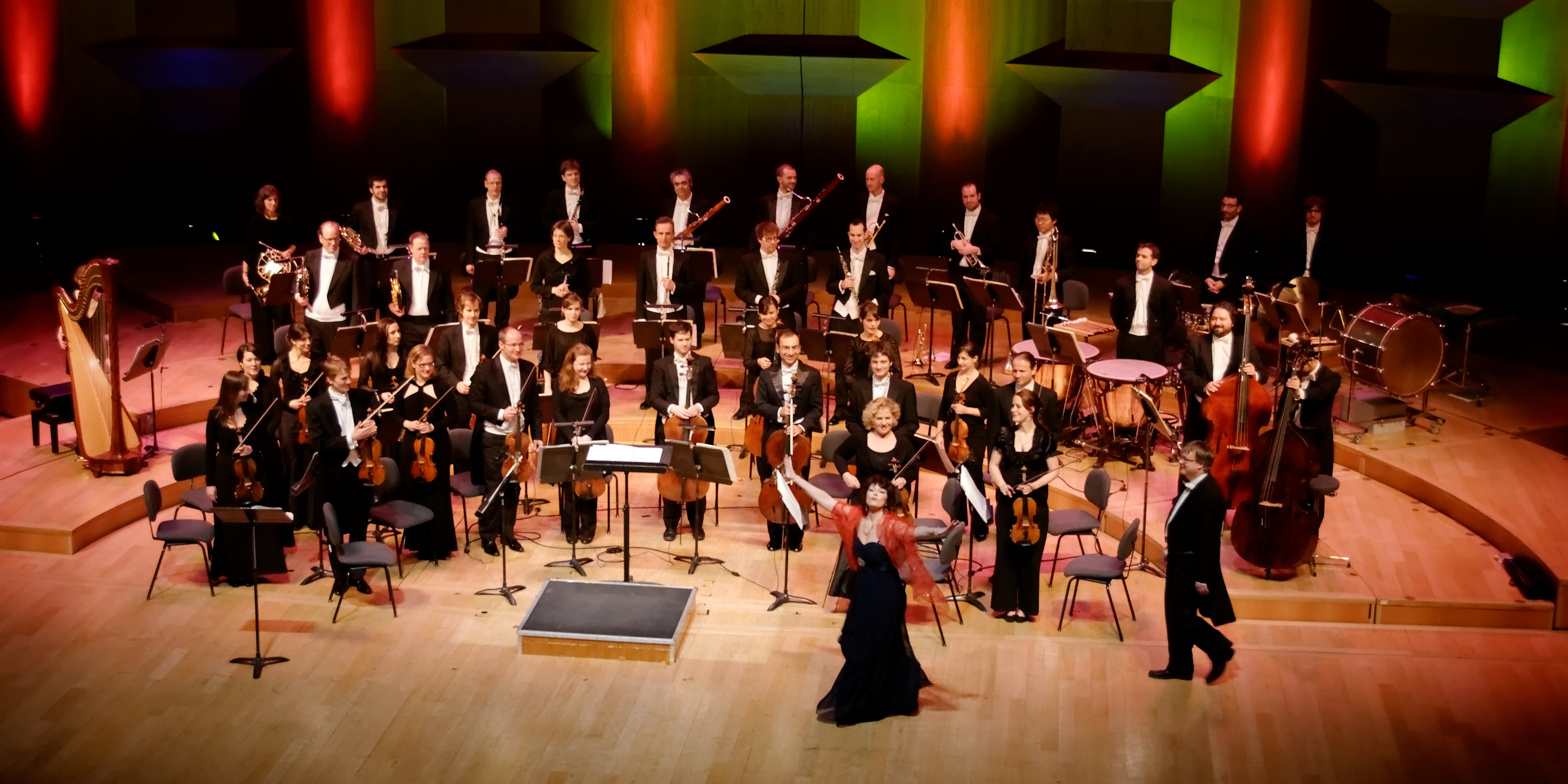
- Kammerorchester in 2013
- Founded: 1984
- Location: Basel, Switzerland
- Website: www.kammerorchesterbasel.ch/en/

The chamber orchestra Kammerorchester Basel was founded in Basel, Switzerland, in 1984. In the tradition of Paul Sacher's Basler Kammerorchester, its focus is on both early music and contemporary classical music. The orchestra plays regularly without a conductor with their leading concertmasters Julia Schröder, Daniel Bard and Baptiste Lopez.

The Basel Chamber Orchestra is recognised as one of the leading chamber orchestras in the classical music scene. Invitations to the most important worldwide concert houses and festivals shape their agenda, as well as their own subscription concerts in Basel.

== Principal Guest Conductor ==
Giovanni Antonini has been the Principal Guest Conductor of the Basel Chamber Orchestra since the 2015/16 season. The conductor and flute player from Milan is known for his innovative interpretations of the baroque and classical repertoire.

== History ==
Kammerorchester Basel, then called Serenata Basel, was formed by graduates of Swiss music academies. It was conducted by Johannes Schläfli until 1999. The ensemble assumed its present name in 1999 and has had no principal conductor since. Since then the chamber orchestra has developed its programme under the leadership of its own concertmasters and guests, as well as in cooperation with selected soloists like Maria João Pires, Sol Gabetta, Nuria Rial, Christoph Prégardien, Erwin Schrott, Khatia Buniatishvili and Patricia Kopatchinskaja, as well as conductors like Trevor Pinnock, Mario Venzago, Heinz Holliger, René Jacobs and Christophe Rousset. The orchestra performs both early and modern music and continues the tradition of Paul Sacher's Basler Kammerorchester (1926–1987). Music up to the classical period is performed on period instruments. Every year the orchestra also commissions new works. Performances are often led by the concertmaster. Guest conductors have included Paul Goodwin, Christopher Hogwood, Kristjan Järvi, Paul McCreesh and David Stern. Guest performances at the most popular concert halls in the world and regular invitations to renowned festivals around Europe are proof of the high level of recognition of the most internationally successful Chamber Orchestra in Switzerland. Since 2015/16, Giovanni Antonini, with whom the Basel Chamber Orchestra has had a close artistic relationship for years, has been the Principal Guest Conductor.

== Music ==
In 2004, Kammerorchester Basel played Handel's opera Lotario both in Basel and at the Handel Festival Halle. They recorded all of Beethoven's symphonies, led by conductor Giovanni Antonini. A review of Symphony No. 5 noted the "period practice lightness, despite the use of modern instrument", "refinement and delicacy", "fleet-footedness in the scherzo – particular from the running basses and cellos at the start of the trio", and the finale "thrillingly and refreshingly done, remarkable, once again, for the care and attention to details".

In 2011, the orchestra accompanied Andreas Scholl in a recording of Bach cantatas including Ich habe genug, BWV 82 and Gott soll allein mein Herze haben, BWV 169. A review described the orchestra, led by concert master Julia Schröder, as "lively and definitive" and noted that it provided "a clear and articulated accompaniment throughout". They performed the works at the Barbican Centre in 2012. In 2013, they combined them with the sinfonia from cantata Ich steh mit einem Fuß im Grabe, BWV 156, and Bach's Harpsichord concerto No. 5 in F minor, BWV 1056. Members of the orchestra sang and played the closing chorale of BWV 169.

In 2013 they played, conducted by Mario Venzago, Sommernacht for string orchestra by Othmar Schoeck, the first cello concerto by Dmitri Shostakovich with Sol Gabetta as soloist, and Schubert's Symphony No. 7.

== Awards ==
In 2008, Kammerorchester Basel won the ECHO Klassik award as "Ensemble of the Year". In 2012, the orchestra, led by Julia Schröder, won the award for the "Opera Recording of the Year", arias by Georg Philipp Telemann sung by Nuria Rial.

The first Swiss orchestra to receive a Swiss Music Prize in 2019 - the Kammerorchester Basel now receives this recognition. The Federal Office of Culture thus appreciates the "special vision of creating a classical orchestra beyond the longstanding institutions". In addition, the "excellent programmes at the highest musical level" and "new forms of communication aimed not only at connoisseurs but also at children and amateurs" will be highlighted. The award ceremony took place on 20 September 2019 at the Kunstmuseum Basel in the presence of Federal Councillor Alain Berset.

== Projects ==
=== The Schubert Cycle ===
Between 2017 and 2019, Heinz Holliger's 80th birthday, the Basel Chamber Orchestra will make a cyclical complete recording of all of Franz Schubert's symphonies in conjunction with selected opera overtures, together with the Swiss conductor and composer, and present them in concerts – some of which are also played in contrast to selected compositions of Holliger.

=== Haydn 2032 ===
By 2032, Haydn's 300th birthday, the Chamber Orchestra will perform all of Joseph Haydn's symphonies, under the leadership of Principal Guest Conductor Giovanni Antonini, alternately with his own Ensemble Il Giardino Armonico, in thematic cycles across Europe, on period instruments, with the original composition and in the historic pitch of 430 Hz.
