= Delphine Galou =

French contralto

Delphine Galou (born 1977) is a French contralto. Specializing in Baroque music, she began her career as a mezzo-soprano before moving down to the contralto range.

== Early life and education ==
Galou was born in Paris in 1977.

She studied philosophy at the Sorbonne while also studying piano and voice.

She was the "Discovery of the Year" of the French Association for the Promotion of Young Artists in 2004.

== Career ==
Galou started her career in 2000 as a member of the ensemble of the "Jeunes Voix du Rhin". She has collaborated with orchestras such as the Balthasar-Neumann-Ensemble (Thomas Hengelbrock), I Barocchisti (Diego Fasolis), Accademia Bizantina (Ottavio Dantone), Collegium 1704 (Václav Luks), Venice Baroque Orchestra (Andrea Marcon), Il Complesso Barocco (Alan Curtis), Les Siècles (François-Xavier Roth), Les Arts Florissants (Jonathan Cohen), Le Concert des Nations (Jordi Savall), Ensemble Matheus (Jean-Christophe Spinosi) and Les Musiciens du Louvre Grenoble (Marc Minkowski).

As a concert soloist, Galou is, among others, a regular guest of the Beaune Baroque Festival, where she was acclaimed in Rinaldo and Alessandro by Händel, Semiramide by Nicola Porpora, and Juditha triumphans and Orlando furioso by Vivaldi.

== Personal life ==
Galou married conductor Ottavio Dantone after collaborating on a number of projects with the orchestra Accademia Bizantina.

== Recordings ==
Galou has also taken part in the CD recording of Porpora's Vespro per la Festività dell'Assunta under the baton of Martin Gester (live recording - Ambronay Editions. Released in 2011), Vivaldi's Teuzzone under the baton of Jordi Savall (2012 - Naïve Records) and Vivaldi's Orlando furioso under the baton of Federico Maria Sardelli (2012 - Naïve Records).

- Agitata, Accademia Bizantina, 2017, Ottavio Dantone, Alpha. (Solo recital)

== Roles ==
This is a partial list of roles based on information from the artist's website.

Date	Composer	Work	Role	House	Conductor	Director	Remarks
Mar 2006	Ravel	L'enfant et les sortilèges	Multiple Roles	Theatre Graslin Nantes and the Grand Theatre Angers			
Apr 2007	Vivaldi	Giustino	Eufemia	Schwetzingen Festival, Germany			
Apr 2008	Händel	Giulio Cesare	Julius Caesar	Théâtre de Caen, France			
Jan 2008	Haydn	Il mondo della luna	Ernesto	Grand Théâtre de Luxembourg			
Jun 2008	Benjamin Britten	A Midsummer Night's Dream	Hermia	Opéra National de Lorraine, Nancy			
Apr 2008	Agostino Steffani	Niobe, regina di Tebe	Nerea	Schwetzingen Festival, Germany	Thomas Hengelbrock		
Feb 2009	Händel	Radamisto	Zenobia	Baden State Theatre, Karlsruhe	Peter Van Heyghen		
Jun 2009	Vivaldi	Orlando Furioso	Orlando	Theater Basel	Andrea Marcon		
Jan 2011	Benjamin Britten	The Rape of Lucretia	Lucretia	Nantes / Theatre Graslin and the Angers / Grand Theatre			
Jul 2011	Vivaldi	Juditha triumphans	(Soloist)	Beaune Baroque Festival	Federico Maria Sardelli		Concert Performance.
Apr 2012	Händel	Rinaldo	Rinaldo	Teatro Municipale Valli, Italy	Ottavio Dantone		
Sep 2012	Monteverdi	Il ritorno d'Ulisse in patria	Penelope	Theater an der Wien	Christophe Rousset		
Oct 2012	Vivaldi	Tito Manlio		Kraków Opera House	Ottavio Dantone		Concert performance
April 2012	Händel	Juditha Triumphans	Holofernes	Misteria paschalia festival, Kraków	Ottavio Dantone		
Jan 2012	Händel	Il trionfo del Tempo e del Disinganno	Disinganno	Staatsoper im Schiller Theater, Berlin	Marc Minkowski		
Jun 2013	Vivaldi	Juditha triumphans	(Soloist)	St. Reinoldi, Dortmund	Christophe Rousset		Concert Performance
May 2013	Vivaldi	Farnace	Berenice	Teatro del Maggio Musicale, Florence			
Sep 2013	Gluck	Orfeo ed Euridice	Orfeo	Opéra national de Montpellier	Balázs Kocsár		
Oct 2013	Händel	Aci, Galatea e Polifemo	Galatea	Wiener Konzerthaus in Vienna	Emmanuelle Haim		
Jun 2014	Händel	Il trionfo del tempo e del disinganno	Disinganno	The Berlin Staatsoper	Sébastien Rouland	Jürgen Flimm	
Jan 2015	Händel	Tamerlano	Andronico	Théâtre Royal de La Monnaie à Bruxelles	Christophe Rousset	Pierre Audi	
May 2015	Vivaldi	La verità in cimento	Damira	Opernhaus Zürich	Ottavio Dantone		
