= Nicolò Beregan =

Italian nobleman, lawyer and amateur opera librettist

Count Nicolò Beregan (also Berengani and Bergani; 21 February 1627 – 17 December 1713) was a nobleman, lawyer and amateur opera librettist from the Republic of Venice. His Giustino was first set to music in 1683 by composer Giovanni Legrenzi for Il Giustino, and later reused by both Vivaldi (Giustino, 1724) and Handel (Giustino, 1737).

== Biography ==
Beregan was born in Vicenza on February 21, 1627. He was one of the best-known lawyers in Venice and was widely respected as a literary figure and classical scholar. His Italian translation of the works of the Latin poet Claudian is particularly well-regarded. He was a member of three academies: the Dodonei in Venice, the Concordi in Ravenna and the Gelati in Bologna. During his period of activity as a librettist he was in contact with the imperial court at Vienna and corresponded with John Frederick, Duke of Brunswick, a principal military and musical supporter of the Venetians. Beregan’s librettos, generally in a heroic vein, were set by some of the best-known composers of the time, and were revised or drawn upon by other librettists. Genserico (1669) was the source for the libretto of Handel’s uncompleted opera of that name; and Handel also set Pariati’s 1724 revision (for Rome) of Beregan’s Giustino (1683). Domenico Scarlatti wrote an opera based on Giustino to a text by Giulio Convò.

== Librettos ==
- Annibale in Capita, set by Pietro Andrea Ziani, 1661

== Bibliography ==
- Ferrari, Giorgio E. (1966). "BEREGAN, Nicolò". Dizionario Biografico degli Italiani (in Italian). Vol. 8: Bellucci–Beregan. Rome: Istituto dell'Enciclopedia Italiana. ISBN 978-88-12-00032-6.
