= Andrzej Markowski =

Polish composer and conductor

Andrzej Markowski (22 August 1924 – 30 October 1986) was a Polish composer and conductor. He was born in Lublin and died in Warsaw. He was the director of the Wrocław Philharmonic from 1965 to 1968 and founded the Wratislavia Cantans festival and was its first director. On his initiative, the following festivals were also established: the Festival of Polish Contemporary Music in Wrocław, the Festival of Organ and Harpsichord Music, the Krakow Spring Festival of Young Musicians.

He was awarded the Minister of Culture and Art Award, 2nd class in 1965. He received the "Orpheus" critics' award in 1968 and 1971. In 1969 he was awarded the annual Polish Composers' Union prize and in 1974 he received the State Award, 1st class.

== Selected Film music ==
- Colonel Wolodyjowski (1968)
- The Silent Star (1960)
- A Generation (1954)
