= Scipione in Cartagine nuova =

Scipione in Cartagine nuova (Scipio in new Carthage) is an opera seria in three acts by the Italian composer Geminiano Giacomelli, with a libretto by Carlo Innocenzo Frugoni. It was dedicated to Enrichetta d'Este, and was first performed in the spring of 1730 at the old Teatro Ducale in Parma. The stage designer was Pietro Righini, the costume designer was Pietro Cotica and the choreographer was Francesco Massimiliano Pagnini.

== Roles ==
Role	Voice type	Premiere cast, spring of 1730, Teatro Ducale, Parma
P. Cornelio Scipione, proconsul of Spain	soprano castrato	Carlo Broschi, known as Farinelli
C. Lelio, one of the Romans	alto castrato	Giuseppe Galletti
Argea, daughter of Armene, in love with Indibile	contralto	Anna Bagnolesi
Armene, captain of new Carthage, father of Argea	tenor	Pietro Baratti
Elvira, princess of Ilergetes, betrothed to Lucejo	soprano	Francesca Cuzzoni Sandoni
Lucejo, prince of the Celtiberians, in love with Elvira	soprano castrato	Giovanni Carestini
Indibile, prince of Ilergetes, brother to Elvira and in love with Argea	contralto (en travesti)	Caterina Della Parte
Roman officers, Roman soldiers, lictors with Scipione Roman, officers with Lelio; Spanish soldiers with Lucejo and Indibile; Moorish slaves with Elvira; pages with Argea; ambassadors of homage Spaniards that come to Scipio; conspirators with Armene; noble gladiators, intended to celebrate the victory of Scipione.
