= Kangmin Justin Kim =

Korean-American countertenor

Kangmin Justin Kim is a Korean-American countertenor specializing in the Baroque, Mozart and contemporary music repertoire.

== Early life and training ==
Kim was born in South Korea on December 1, 1988, where he lived until he was 11 years old. In 2000, his family moved to Hoffman Estates, Illinois. His father is an engineer and his mother a deaconess. He studied at Northwestern University in Evanston and the Royal Academy of Music in London.

== Career ==
Kangmin Justin Kim's career started in 2013, when he performed a leading role in Francesco Cavalli's opera Elena at the Aix-en-Provence Festival conducted by Leonardo García Alarcón. The production also went on tour through several French and European cities, where Kim auditioned for various opera companies and got engaged to sing the role of Sesto in Wolfgang Amadeus Mozart's La Clemenza di Tito at the Montpellier Opera House in the 2014/15 season. In Aix-en-Provence, he also got to know Marc Minkowski and Ivan Alexander with whom he sang Prince Orlofsky in a new production of Die Fledermaus at the Opéra Comique of Paris in the same season. Another important engagement in 2014/15 was his debut at the Théâtre du Châtelet in Paris as Oreste in La Belle Hélène which was telecast by Arte.

He was a member of the opera company in Heidelberg in the 2015/16 season, where his roles included Cherubino in Le Nozze di Figaro and the title role in the world premiere of Johannes Kalitzke's Pym.

In the 2016/17 season, Kangmin Justin Kim made his debuts at many prestigious international opera houses and festivals, singing Speranza in Claudio Monteverdi's L'Orfeo and Nerone in L'incoronazione di Poppea with the Monteverdi Choir and English Baroque Soloists conducted by Sir John Eliot Gardiner as part of a tour with performances at the Teatro La Fenice, the Salzburg Festival, Edinburgh Festival, Lucerne Festival, Berliner Philharmonie and Philharmonie de Paris. About his Nerone at the New York Alice Tully Hall, The New York Times wrote that Kim "made a headstrong Nero, with his wildly punkish blond hair and a wiry physique always coiled and ready to pounce" and that "his intensity was terrifying".

He made his debuts at the Glyndebourne Festival as Nireno in Handel's Giulio Cesare in Egitto and at the Staatsoper Unter den Linden in Berlin as Nerone in L'incoronazione di Poppea in 2018.

In 2019, he made history as the first countertenor singing Cherubino in Wolfgang Amadeus Mozart's Le Nozze di Figaro at the Royal Opera House Covent Garden conducted by Sir John Eliot Gardiner, also making his house debut. Cherubino was one of three trouser roles by Mozart that Kim performed that year, together with Idamante in Idomeneo in Wiesbaden and Annio in La Clemenza di Tito at the Theater an der Wien in Vienna.

In 2020, is scheduled to sing Ruggero in Alcina in Dijon and Nancy conducted by Leonardo Garcia Alarcon, Orlofsky in Cologne and the title role of M. Butterfly, a new opera by Huang Ruo and David Henry Hwang at the Santa Fe Opera.

== Kimchilia Bartoli ==
In 2011, Kim took the Internet by storm when he posted a video on YouTube in which - as his alter-ego Kimchilia Bartoli - he did a parody of legendary mezzo-soprano Cecilia Bartoli, receiving praise for his spot-on imitation of the famous diva as well for his performance of the difficult coloratura of the aria "Agitata da due venti" from Griselda.

== Discography ==
- 2017: Parnasso in festa conducted by Andrea Marcon, Pentatone (Catalogue No: 5186643)
