= Giovanni Antonini =

Italian conductor and recorder soloist

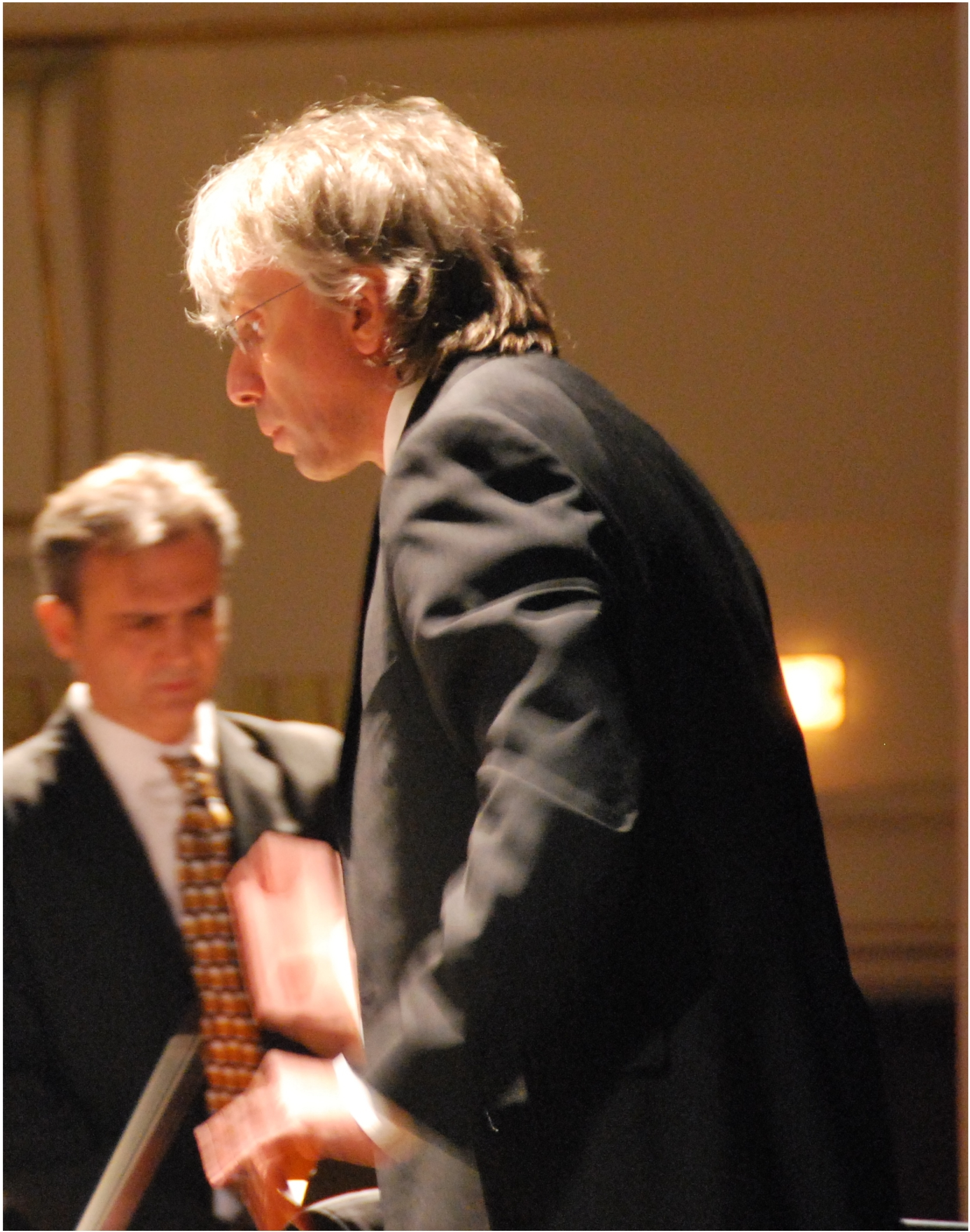
Giovanni Antonini, Misteria Paschalia Festival, Kraków Philharmonic, 04.04.2010.

Giovanni Antonini (born 1965) is an Italian conductor and soloist on the recorder and baroque transverse flute. He studied in his native Milan, and attended the Civica Scuola di Musica in that city and the Centre de Musique Ancienne in Geneva. In 1985, along with Luca Pianca, he co-founded Il Giardino Armonico, a pioneering Italian early music ensemble based in Milan.

Antonini is part of the Italian historically informed performance movement, and has performed with musicians including Christoph Prégardien, Christophe Coin, Katia and Marielle Labèque, Viktoria Mullova and Giuliano Carmignola. With Il Giardino Armonico he has received the Gramophone Award, Diapason d’Or, and Choc du Monde de la Musique.

In 2014, Antonini, with Il Giardino Armonico and Kammerorchester Basel, commenced a project aiming to perform and record on period instruments all of Joseph Haydn's symphonies by 2032, the 300th anniversary of the composer's birth.
