= Merope (Giacomelli) =

La Merope is an opera seria in three acts by Geminiano Giacomelli with a libretto by Apostolo Zeno. It was dedicated to Karl August, Prince of Waldeck and Pyrmont. It was first performed in 1734 at the Teatro Grimani di San Giovanni Grisostomo in Venice. The stage designer was Alessandro Mauro, the costume designer was Natale Canciani and the choreographer was Francesco Aquilante.

== Music ==
The opera contains the famous aria "Sposa, non mi conosci" sung by the character Epitide. It was later used by Vivaldi in his pasticcio Bajazet and it was now called "Sposa son disprezzata", because of the new text. Another aria is "Quell'usignolo" (also sung by Epitide) which also had been recorded many times, and the aria is also known for its difficult coloratura part. The full opera has never been recorded.

== Roles ==
Role	Voice type	Premiere cast, 1734
Polifonte, tyrant of Messene	tenor	Francesco Tolve
Merope, queen of Messene, widow of Cresfonte	contralto	Lucia Facchinelli
Epitide, son of Merope	soprano castrato	Carlo Broschi, known as Farinelli
Argia, princess of Aetolia	soprano	Maria Teresa Piori Fiorentina
Trasimede, Head of the Council of Messene	soprano castrato	Gaetano Majorano, known as Cafarelli
Licisco, ambassador of Aetolia	contralto (en travesti)	Caterina Giorgi
Anassandro confidant of Polifonte	contralto castrato	Antonio Baldi
