= Paul McCreesh =

British conductor

Paul Dominic McCreesh CBE (born 24 May 1960) is an English conductor.

Paul McCreesh is the founder and artistic director of the Gabrieli Consort & Players. With them he has performed in major concert halls and festivals across the world. He has been the artistic director of the Wratislavia Cantans Festival in Wrocław, Poland and of the Brinkburn Festival in England.

In 2005 Loughborough University conferred on him the honorary degree of Doctor of Letters.

== Musical education ==
McCreesh began his career as a cellist and took his MusB from the University of Manchester in 1981.

== Repertoire and performance ==
Paul McCreesh made his name in the music of the Renaissance and Baroque periods, particularly that of Venice. The Gabrieli Consort was founded in 1982 and as of 2020 is still active. McCreesh and the Gabrielis made a successful Proms début in 1992: the second part of the concert was "Music for the Coronation of a Doge, 27 April 1595".

In recent years he has also worked with modern instrument orchestras including the DSO Berlin, RSO Berlin, Zurich Chamber Orchestra, Ensemble Orchestral de Paris, Detroit Symphony Orchestra, Minnesota Orchestra, Gothenburg Symphony, Sinfónica de Euskadi, Stockholm Philharmonic and Beethovenhalle Bonn, the Netherlands Philharmonic Orchestra and the Orchestra Sinfonica dell'Accademia Nazionale di Santa Cecilia di Roma.

=== Opera ===
McCreesh has conducted Handel's Jephtha for Welsh National Opera and Gluck's Orfeo ed Euridice, as well as Mozart's The Magic Flute for Royal Danish Opera and, for Komische Oper Berlin, a new David Alden staging of Handel's Alcina. He has also conducted Handel's Rodelinda at the Beaune Festival and at the Brinkburn Festival, which he founded.

== Recordings ==
From 1993 Paul McCreesh built a large discography for Deutsche Grammophon. In 2011 he established Winged Lion, an independent label, which is a subsidiary of Signum Records.

=== Reconstructions ===
McCreesh is noted for his "liturgical reconstructions" in which music is presented in the context of a specific liturgy with appropriate background sounds such as bell-ringing. The Gramophone Award winning album "Venetian Coronation" (released on Virgin Classics in 1990) represented a breakthrough for the Gabrieli Consort and Players. A new version of this musical reconstruction of the coronation of Marino Grimani was released in 2012 on Winged Lion.

"Music for the Duke of Lerma" is a musical reconstruction featuring Spanish sacred music associated with Francisco Gómez de Sandoval, 1st Duke of Lerma. It was released on DG's Archiv label.

=== Opera ===
In 2020 McCreesh's recording of Purcell's semi-opera King Arthur was judged best recording of the year by BBC Music Magazine.
