= Andrea Marcon =

Italian conductor (born 1963)

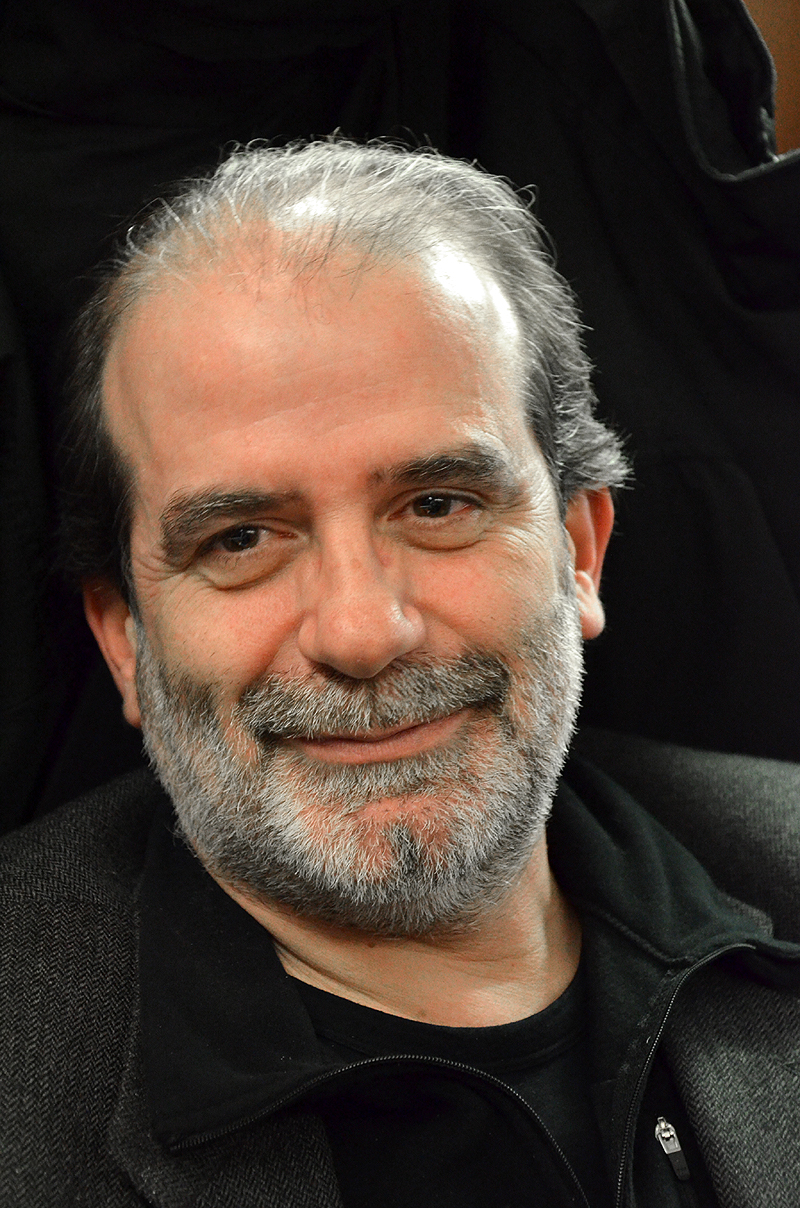
Andrea Marcon

Andrea Marcon (born 6 February 1963 in Treviso, Italy) is an Italian conductor, organist, harpsichordist, and scholar. In 1997, he founded the Venice Baroque Orchestra. Marcon studied at the Schola Cantorum Basiliensis. He was awarded the Handel Prize in 2021.

== Recordings ==
- Handel: Parnasso in festa. Andrea Marcon, David Hansen, Robin Johannsen, Kangmin Justin Kim, Jenny Högstrom, Silke Gäng, Francesca Ascioti, Luca Tittoto, La Cetra Barockorchester Basel, La Cetra Vokalensemble Basel. PENTATONE PTC 5186643 (2017).
- Vivaldi and others: Andromeda liberata (serenata)
- Vivaldi: Opera arias, with Magdalena Kožená
- Handel: Ah! mio cor (opera arias), with Magdalena Kožená
- Vivaldi: Several concerto recordings with Giuliano Carmignola (violin)
