= Luca Pianca =

Swiss musician-lutenist (born 1958)

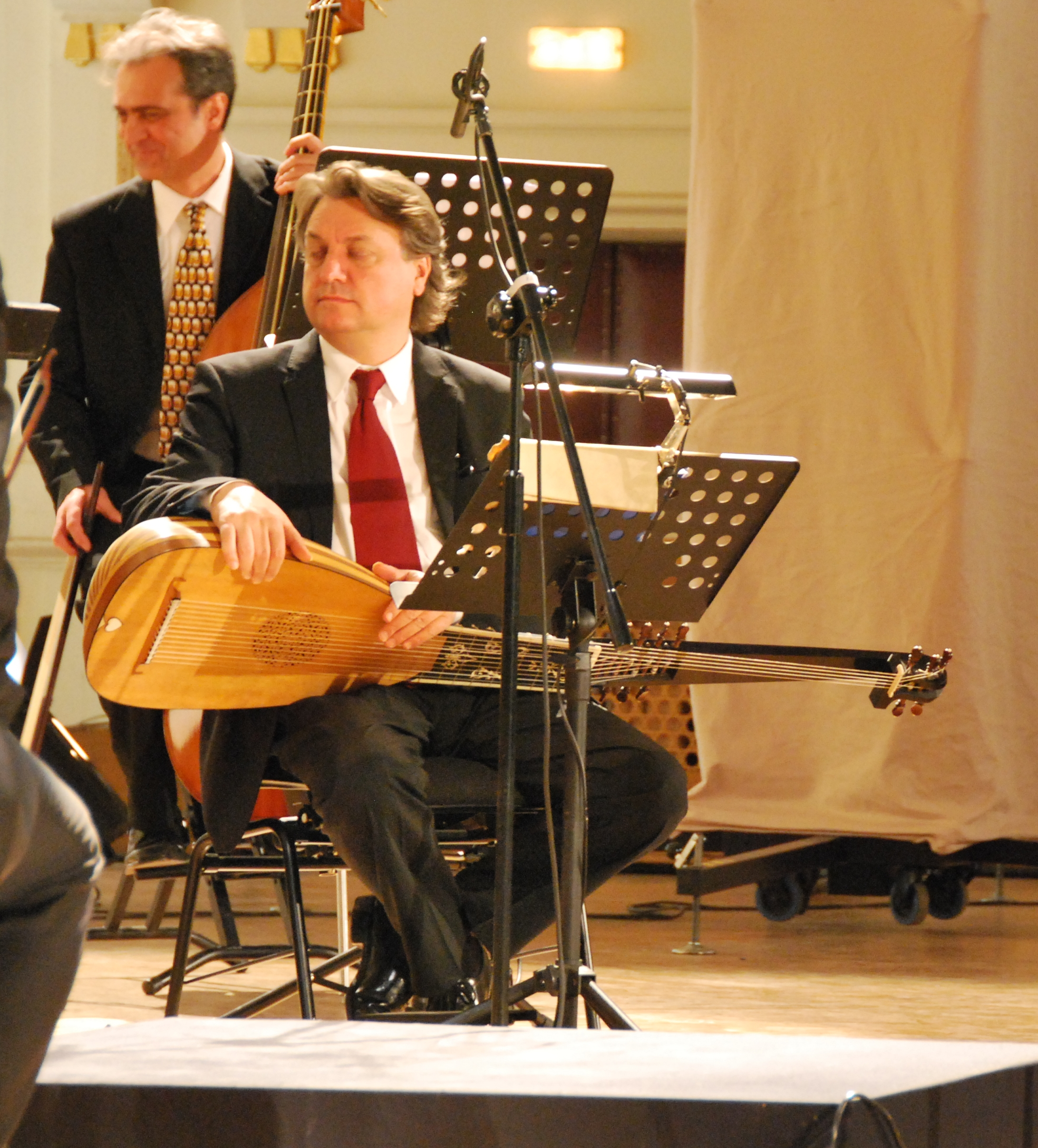
Luca Pianca, Easter Mysteries Festival, Kraków Philharmonic, 04.04.2010.

Luca Pianca (born 1958) is a Swiss musician-lutenist whose specialty is archlute. In 1985 he co - founded Il Giardino Armonico, a pioneering Italian early-music ensemble based in Milan. He has premiered works by the contemporary lutenist-composer Roman Turovsky-Savchuk at international festivals, and received numerous international awards for his recordings.

== Early life and education ==
Luca Pianca was born in Lugano, Switzerland of ethnic Italian ancestry. He studied with Nikolaus Harnoncourt at the Mozarteum University of Salzburg, Austria.

== Career ==
Since 1982 Pianca has collaborated with Concentus Musicus Wien. He also served as a lutenist at Zurich Opera House. In 1985 he was co-founder of Il Giardino Armonico (The Harmonic Garden), an Italian early-music ensemble that pioneered performances of many Baroque and contemporary works.

Luca Pianca has recorded more than 20 CDs, both with and without Il Giardino Armonico, including complete recordings of lute repertoire by J.S.Bach and Antonio Vivaldi. He has partnered with internationally known opera singers and soloists such as Italian Cecilia Bartoli, Eva Mei, and American Sylvia McNair.

Since 1999, Pianca has teamed with viola da gamba player Vittorio Ghielmi to record numerous CDs. Since 2001 he has also collaborated with the contemporary lutenist-composer Roman Turovsky-Savchuk, whose works he premiered at several international festivals: Urbino, Salamanca, Paris, and Vilnius, inter alia.

== Honours and awards ==
- Five Diapason d'Or, Diapason (Tuning Fork) magazine
- Four Choc awards, Le Monde de la musique magazine
- Gramophone Award, 1996 (The Gramophone magazine, United Kingdom)
- Deutscher Schallplattenpreis (German Record Award), 1998

== Discography ==
- Bagpipes from Hell — Music for Viola da gamba, Lyra-viol, Lute and Ceterone. 17th and 18th century, Vittorio Ghielmi, Luca Pianca, 1999
- Pièces de caractère — Works by: Marais, Forqueray, Mouton, Dollé, Caix d'Hervelois, De Visée, Vittorio Ghielmi, Luca Pianca, 2002
- Duo - German Music for Lute & Viol, Vittorio Ghielmi, Luca Pianca, 2005
- Devil's Dream, Ghielmi, Pianca, Gibelli, 2006
