= Il Giardino Armonico =

Italian ensemble

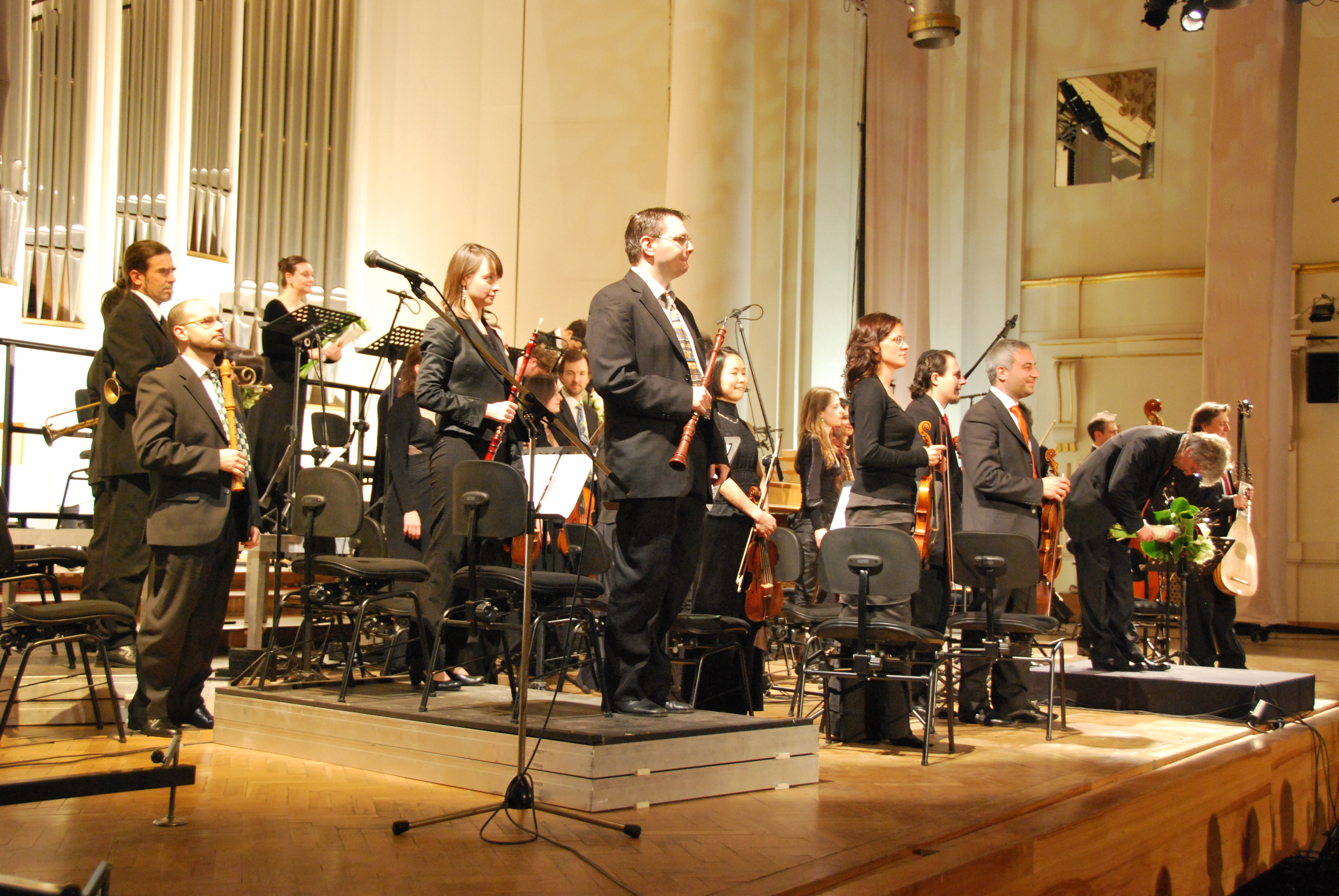
Il Giardino Armonico in the Kraków Philharmonic during the Misteria Paschalia Festival, April 2010

Il Giardino Armonico ("The Garden of Harmony") is an Italian ensemble well noted for its practice of Historically Informed Performance and founded in Milan in 1985 by Luca Pianca and Giovanni Antonini, primarily to play 17th- and 18th-century music on period instruments.

Il Giardino Armonico performs with soloists such as the mezzo-soprano Cecilia Bartoli, duo pianists Katia and Marielle Labèque, (Baroque) violinist Enrico Onofri, cellist Christophe Coin, and soprano Danielle de Niese. Its recordings have met with honors including the Gramophone and Grammy Awards.

Il Giardino Armonico performs both in concerts and in opera stage productions of works such as by Monteverdi, Handel, Pergolesi and Vivaldi. In 2014, the ensemble, alternately with Kammerorchester Basel, commenced a project aiming to perform and record all of Joseph Haydn's symphonies by 2032, the 300th anniversary of the composer's birth.
