= Sonia Prina =

Italian operatic contralto (born 1975)

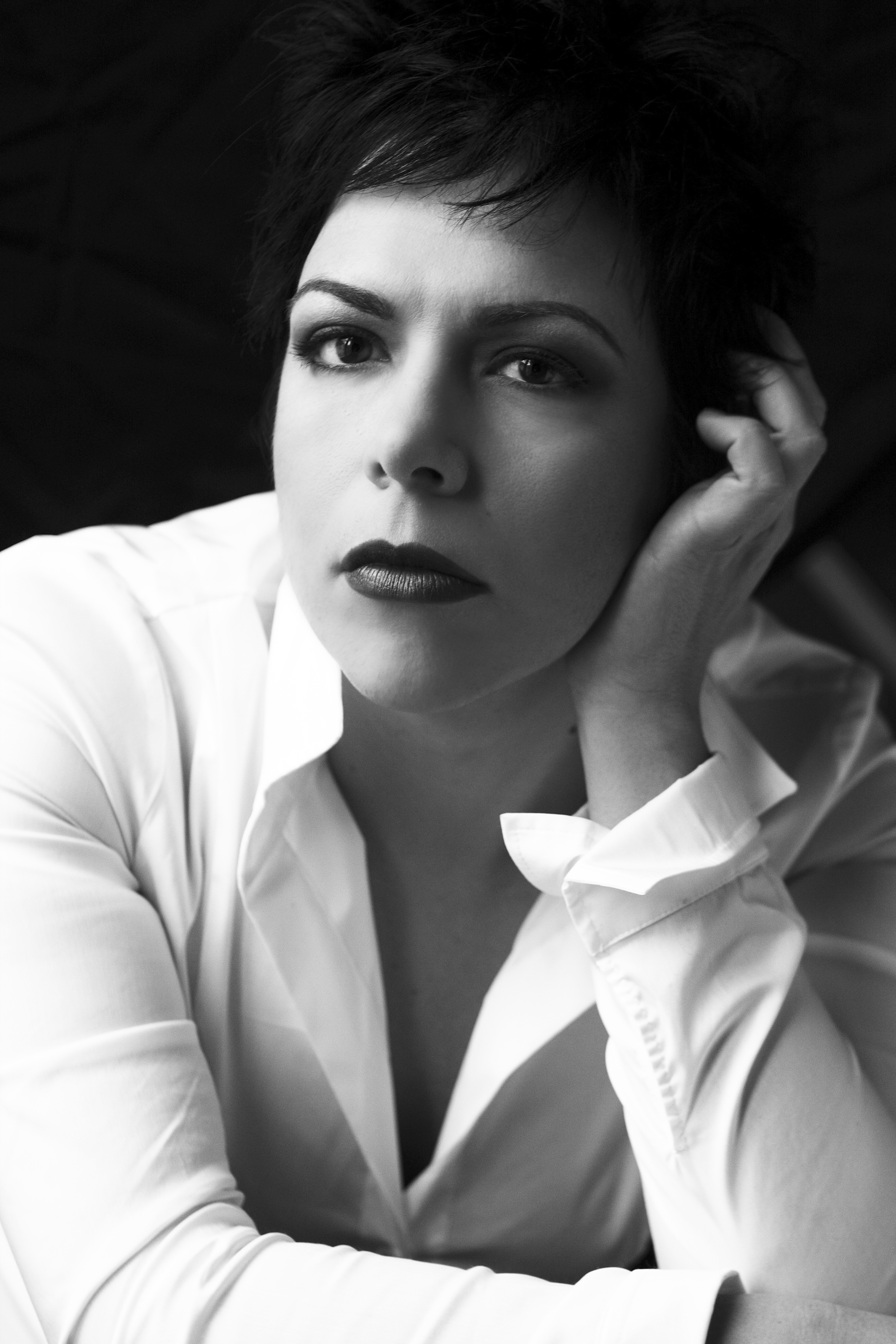
- Born: 30 November 1975 (age 50); Magenta, Lombardy
- Education: Music Conservatoire "Giuseppe Verdi", Milan; La Scala Academy
- Occupation: Classical contralto

Sonia Prina (born 30 November 1975) is an Italian operatic contralto who has had an active career in concerts and operas since the mid-1990s. She is particularly known for her appearances in Baroque operas and for her performances of the Baroque concert repertoire. She has recorded works by composers George Frideric Handel and Antonio Vivaldi.

== Career ==
Born in Magenta, Prina studied singing and trumpet at the Music Conservatoire "Giuseppe Verdi", Milan and then pursued further studies at the La Scala Academy. She began performing in operas in the mid-1990s, first in the Italian repertoire of Rossini and Donizetti. By 1997, she had established herself as an artist in the Baroque repertoire. Some of the roles she has performed are Amastre in Serse, Bradamante in Alcina, Carilda in Arianna in Creta, Cornelia in Giulio Cesare, Ottone in L’Incoronazione di Poppea, Penelope in Il ritorno d'Ulisse in patria, Polinesso in Ariodante, Valentiniano in Ezio, and the title roles in Orlando, Ottone in villa, Partenope, Rinaldo, Tamerlano, and Tolomeo.

In 2000, she appeared in Cremona as Smeton in Donizetti's Anna Bolena. In 2006, she performed Cornelia at the Théâtre des Champs-Élysées in Paris with Andreas Scholl in the title role. In 2010, she appeared in the title role of Vivaldi's Orlando furioso at the Oper Frankfurt, conducted by Andrea Marcon, with the mad Roland staged as an Italo-Rocker by David Bösch. She performed as Amastre at the Houston Grand Opera.

Prina has also performed at the Barbican Centre, the Bavarian State Opera, the Glyndebourne Festival Opera, La Fenice, the Liceu, Opera Australia, the Paris Opera, the Salzburg Festival, the San Francisco Opera, the Teatro Comunale Alighieri, the Teatro di San Carlo, the Teatro Real, and the Vienna State Opera, among others.
