= Geminiano Giacomelli =

Italian composer (1692-1740)

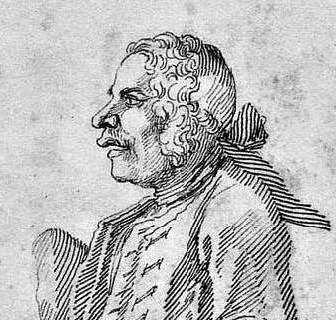
- Born: 28 May 1692; Piacenza
- Died: 25 January 1740 (aged 47); Loreto
- Occupations: Conductor; Composer
- Organizations: Court of the Duke of Parma; Basilica della Santa Casa

Geminiano Giacomelli (sometimes Jacomelli) (28 May 1692 – 25 January 1740) was an Italian composer.

== Biography ==
Giacomelli was born in Piacenza. In 1724, he was named to the post of Kapellmeister to the Duke of Parma. Beginning with the first performance of his opera Ipermestra, in 1724, he became one of the most popular opera composers of his era. Between 1724 and 1740, he composed 19 operas. His best known opera is Cesare in Egitto of 1735. He also wrote a deal of sacred music, including eight psalm settings for tenor and bass, and some concertos with continuo. In 1738, Giacomelli again became Kapellmeister, this time at the Basilica della Santa Casa in Loreto; he died in Loreto in 1740.

== List of works ==
=== Operas ===
- Ipermestra (Venice, 1724)
- Catone in Utica (Vienna 1727; Teatro Ducale, Milan, 1736)
- Scipione in Cartagine (Venice, 1728)
- Zidiana (Milan, 1728)
- Astianatte (Alessandria, 1729)
- Gianguir (Venice, 1729)
- Lucio Papirio dittatore (Parma, 1729)
- Scipione in Cartagine nuova (Parma, 1730)
- Semiramide riconosciuta (Milan, 1730)
- Annibale (Rome, 1731)
- Epaminonda (Venice, 1732)
- Rosbale (Rome, 1732)
- Alessandro Severo (Piacenza, 1732)
- Adriano in Siria (Venice, 1733)
- Il Tigrane (Piacenza, 1733)
- La caccia in Etolia (Vienna, 1733)
- La Merope (Venice, 1734)
- Artaserse (Teatro Pubblico, Pisa, 1734)
- Cesare in Egitto (Milan, 1735)
- Nitocri, regina d'Egitto (Rome, 1736)
- Arsace (Prato, 1736)
- Demetrio (Teatro Regio, Turin, 1736)
- La costanza vincitrice in amore (dramma pastorale per musica – Parma, 1738)
- Achille in Aulide (Teatro Argentina, Rome, 1739)

=== Pasticci ===
- Lucio Papirio dittatore (music of Giacomelli and Handel) (King's Theatre, London, 1732)
- Circe (Theatre am Gänsemarkt, Hamburg, 1734)

== Recordings ==
- Giacomelli Fiamma vorace: Opera Arias Flavio Ferri-Benedetti (countertenor) Musica Fiorita. Pan Classics.

== Sources ==
- Champlin, John Denison Jr. (1888). Apthorp, William Foster (ed.). Cyclopedia of Music and Musicians. Vol. I. New York: Charles Scribner's Sons.
- Champlin, John Denison Jr. (1889). Apthorp, William Foster (ed.). Cyclopedia of Music and Musicians. Vol. II. New York: Charles Scribner's Sons.
- Champlin, John Denison Jr. (1890). Apthorp, William Foster (ed.). Cyclopedia of Music and Musicians. Vol. III. New York: Charles Scribner's Sons.
- A. Della Corte and G.M. Gatti, Dizionario di musica, Paravia, 1956, pag. 255
