= Silla (Handel) =

Opera by Georg Friedrich Händel

George Frideric Handel

Silla (full title Lucio Cornelio Silla, HWV 10) is an opera seria (referred to as a dramma per musica) in three acts by George Frideric Handel. The Italian-language libretto was by Giacomo Rossi. The story concerns the Roman dictator Lucius Cornelius Sulla (138–78 BC) as recounted by Plutarch.

The opera appears to have been a pièce d'occasion, which may have been performed only once. The music was recycled in Handel's later opera Amadigi di Gaula.

== Performance history ==
The first performance might have been on 2 June 1713. A dedication from the librettist, Rossi, to the French ambassador, the Duc d'Aumont, appears with that date in a printed copy of the libretto. There may have been a private performance at the Queen's Theatre, London. However according to the Amadeus Almanac, the performance took place at Burlington House. The opera has been performed in modern times, for instance at the London Handel Festival in 2000, at the Handel Festival, Halle in 2015, and at the Leeds Opera Festival in 2022.

== Roles ==
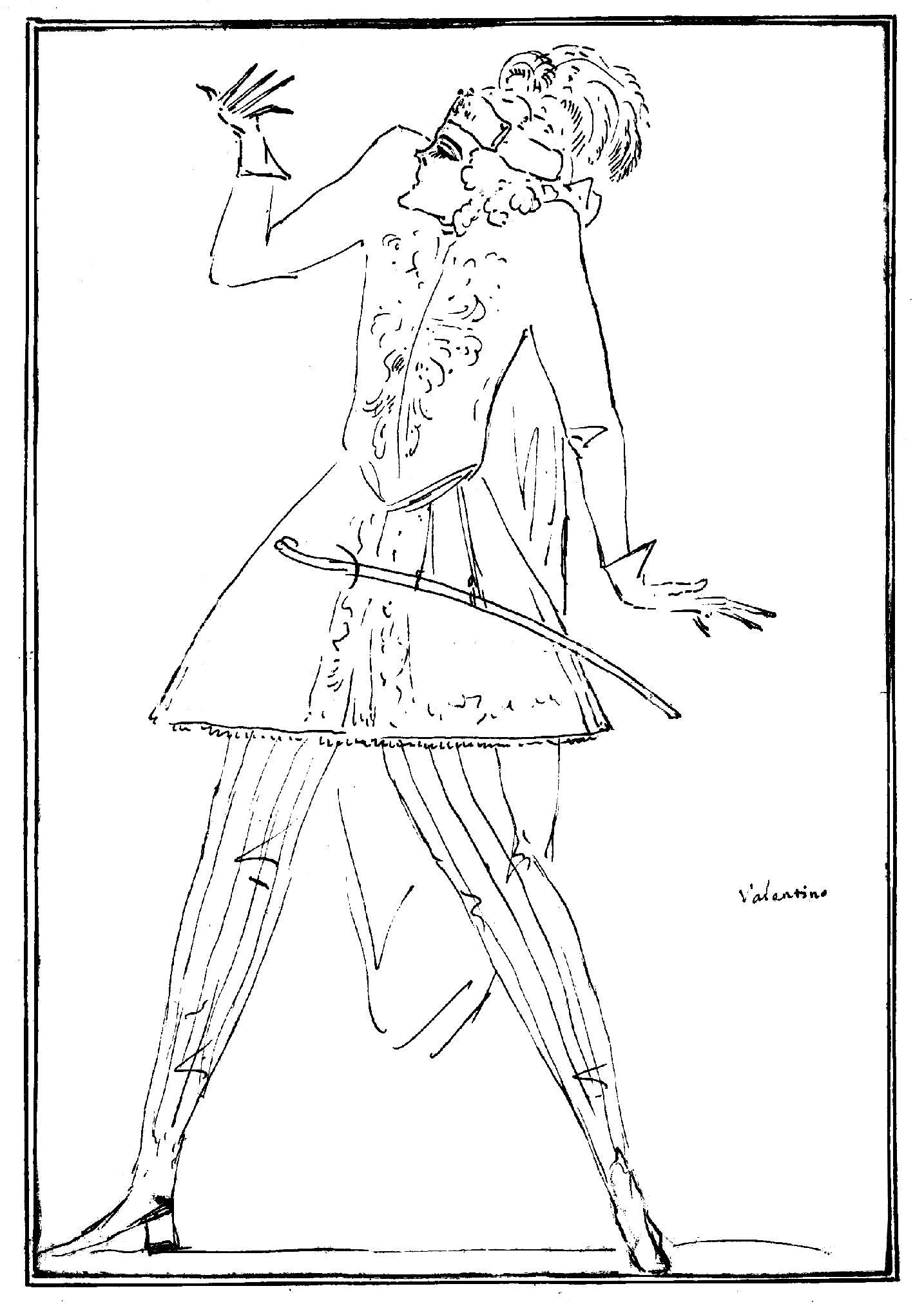
Caricature of Valentino Urbani, who created the role of Silla.

Roles, voice types, and premiere cast
Role	Voice type	Premiere cast, 2 June 1713
Silla, Roman dictator	alto castrato	Valentino Urbani ("Valentini")
Metella, Silla's wife	soprano	Probably Elisabetta Pilotti-Schiavonetti
Lepido, tribune	soprano castrato	Valeriano Pellegrini
Flavia, Lepido's wife	soprano	Francesca Margherita de L'Epine
Claudio, senator, Celia's lover	contralto	Jane Barbier
Celia, Catulus' daughter	soprano	Maria Manina-Fletcher-Seedo
The god Mars	bass	Richard Leveridge
Scabro	non singing actor	

== Synopsis ==
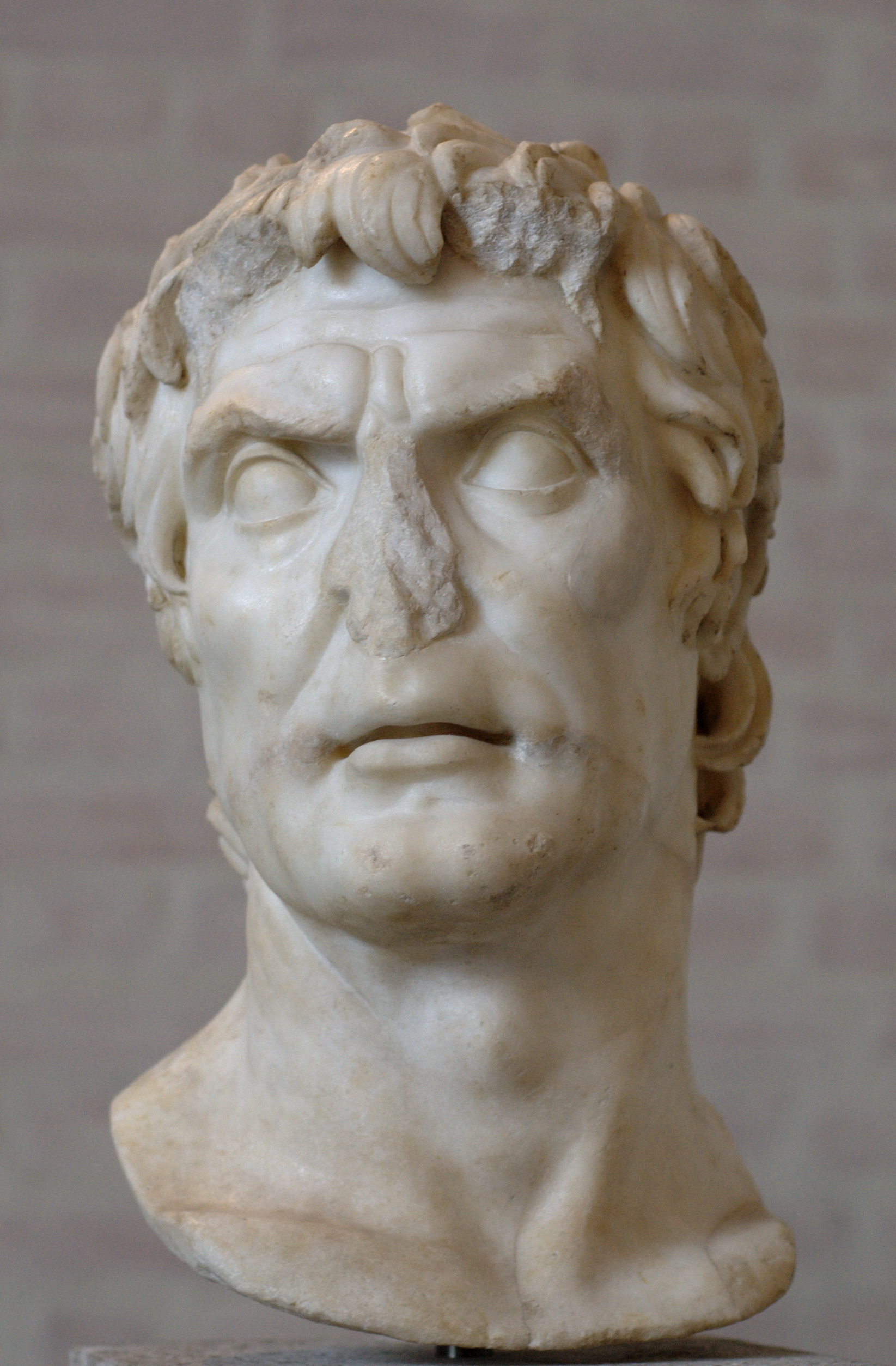
Bust of Sulla, called "Silla" in the opera.

=== Act 1 ===
- Scene: Rome, at the time of the Republic, about 81 B.C.

The military leader Silla returns victorious to Rome, having subdued both rebellious foreign populations and his own personal enemy, Mario (the historical Gaius Marius) and his army. Silla passes through a specially constructed triumphal arch as trumpets sound and the populace acclaim him. When Silla announces that he is proclaiming himself dictator and sole law-giver for Rome, however, both his wife Metella and the tribune Lepido are appalled.

Flavia, Lepido's wife, tells him of bad dreams she has been having about dangers to Rome but Lepido dismisses this as superstition.

Celia, daughter of a high-ranking statesman who also opposed Silla's enemy Mario, is in love with the senator Claudio and he with her but she cannot bring herself to accept him as he is a supporter of Mario.

Claudio confronts Silla and accuses him of destroying Roman liberty. Silla is furious and refuses to hear it, but, left alone, Claudio vows to continue to struggle against tyranny.

=== Act 2 ===
Silla is discovered by his wife Metella attempting to seduce the lovely Celia. Metella puts a stop to this, for the moment.

Silla next attempts the virtue of Lepido's wife Flavia, at her home. Lepido discovers him and intervenes, whereupon Silla accuses Lepido of conspiring with others to overthrow him and orders both Lepido and his wife to be imprisoned, awaiting execution. Husband and wife tearfully bid farewell.

Celia has overcome her scruples about accepting a supporter of her father's enemy, Mario, and has admitted she loves Claudio. The couple are basking in their happiness when Claudio is placed under arrest for conspiring against Silla and also sentenced to death. Metella learns of her husband's cruel and tyrannical orders from her servant Scabro and vows to prevent them from being carried out.

In the tower where he is imprisoned, Claudio can see the arena where he has been condemned to be torn apart by wild beasts and says farewell to life.

Metella takes a garment she has soaked with animal blood and tells her servant Scabro to take it to Silla and tell him it is Lepido's, shed when he was executed. Silla is pleased but still wants to see Claudio torn by beasts. News is brought to Silla that the supporters of Mario are staging a new rebellion and Silla rushes off to quell it. Metella orders both Claudio and Lepido released from prison.

=== Act 3 ===
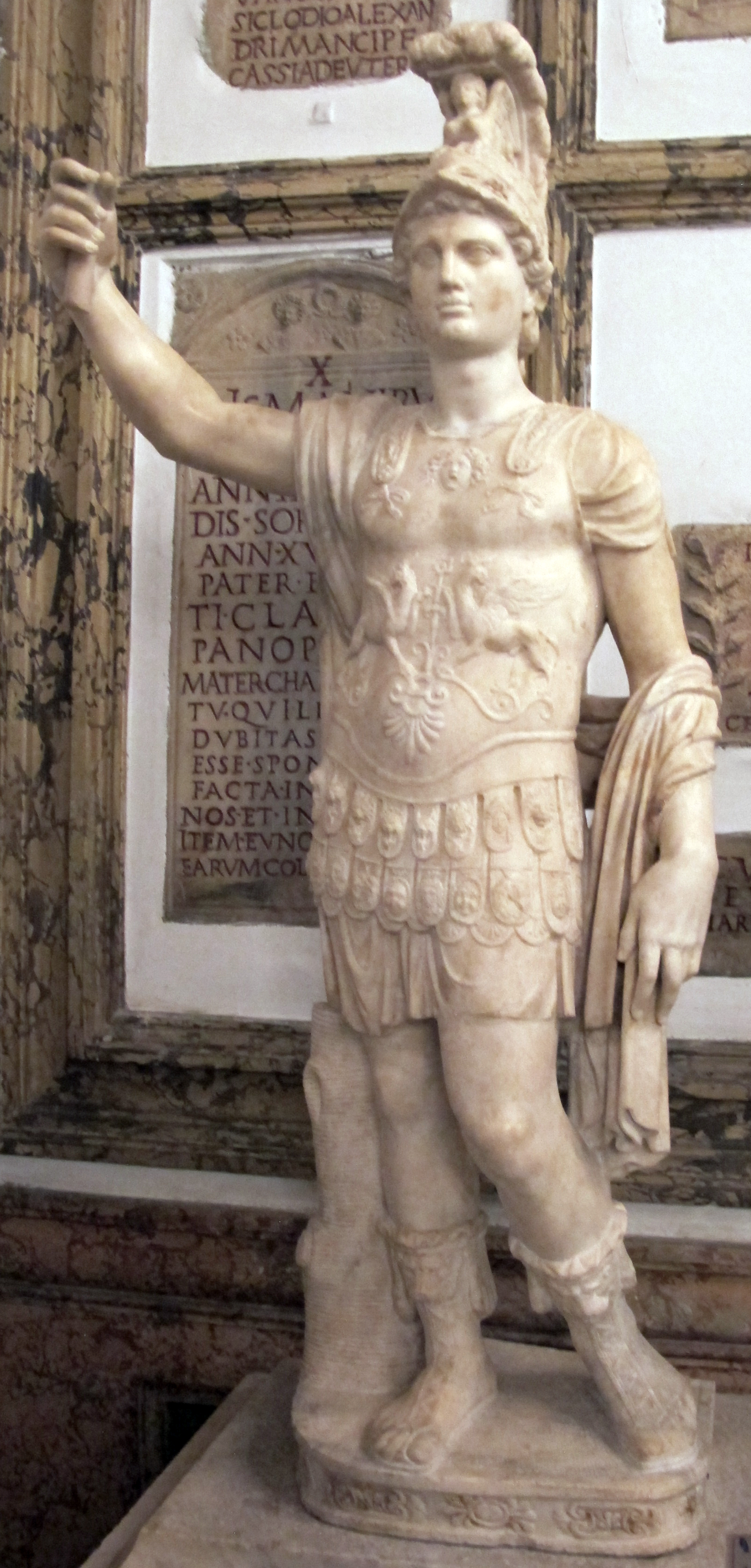
Mars, god of war.

Lepido thanks Metella for rescuing him and announces his intention to assassinate Silla in order to restore Roman freedom. Metella refuses to have anything to do with such a plot against her husband. They receive word that Silla is leaving Rome. While Metella regrets that she has not been able to say good-bye to him, she seizes the opportunity to tell her servant Scabro to take Lepido to his wife Flavia in her prison cell and help her to escape.

Silla regrets the necessity of leaving Rome without satisfying his desires towards either Celia or Flavia. He attempts to seduce Celia again, but she repulses him and he informs her that her beloved Claudio has been torn alive by wild beasts and leaves her. Celia laments her lover's death and hears an echo of her words - it is Claudio himself, who has been listening. At first she thinks it must be a ghost, but she is then overjoyed to be re-united with the living Claudio.

More or less the same scenario then occurs in Flavia's prison cell where she awaits death. Silla appears with the bloodstained garment, telling her it is what her husband was wearing when he was shot by arrows, and threatens her with the same fate unless she will yield herself to his lust. She refuses, whereupon Silla storms out. Lepido appears to his wife and at first she too believes she is seeing a ghost, but he reassures her and they express their delight.

At the port where Silla is embarking to leave Rome, his wife Metella appears to bid him farewell. He expresses his regret at his treatment of her and the couple hope one day they will again be able to be together. Metella watches from the shore as the ship Silla is on flounders in a storm and sinks. Silla escapes the wreck and swims to a nearby island, Metella gets into a little boat, rows out to him and rescues her husband.

Lepido and Claudio are at the Capitol rallying their supporters for a revolt against Silla's monstrous tyranny when the god Mars appears on a cloud and announces Rome's salvation. Metella leads in her repentant husband, who extends apologies to all for his behaviour and announces his retirement to a small estate where he will live quietly with his wife. Claudio and Celia will now marry. All rejoice in the fortunate outcome of events.

== Context and analysis ==
The German-born Handel, after spending some of his early career composing operas and other pieces in Italy, settled in London, where in 1711 he had brought Italian opera for the first time with his opera Rinaldo. A tremendous success, Rinaldo created a craze in London for Italian opera seria, a form focused overwhelmingly on solo arias for the star virtuoso singers. Rinaldo, a "magic" opera featuring enchantments, sorceresses and scenic ingenuity, was followed by Il Pastor Fido, a shorter and simpler opera, which was not a success with London audiences at its first performances. The occasion for which Silla was written is not known and the presence of a part for a non-singing actor (Scabro) in a Handel opera is a unique feature of Silla for which the reason is again unknown. The work is scored for strings, two recorders, two oboes, bassoon, trumpet, and continuo instruments.

== Recordings ==
Handel: Silla – London Handel Orchestra

- Conductor: Denys Darlow
- Principal singers: James Bowman (Silla), Joanne Lunn (Lepido), Simon Baker (Claudio), Rachel Nicholls (Metella), Natasha Marsh (Flavia), Elizabeth Cragg (Celia), Christopher Dixon (The god)
- Recording date: 11 April 2000
- Label: SOMM Recordings – 227-8 (CD)

Handel: Silla – Europa Galante

- Conductor: Fabio Biondi
- Principal singers: Sonia Prina (Silla), Vivica Genaux (Lepido), Martina Belli (Claudio), Sunhae Im (Metella), Roberta Invernizzi (Flavia), Francesca Lombardi Mazzulli (Celia), Luca Tittoto (Il Dio)
- Recording date: 28–30 January 2017
- Label: Glossa Music
