= Teseo =

Opera seria by Handel

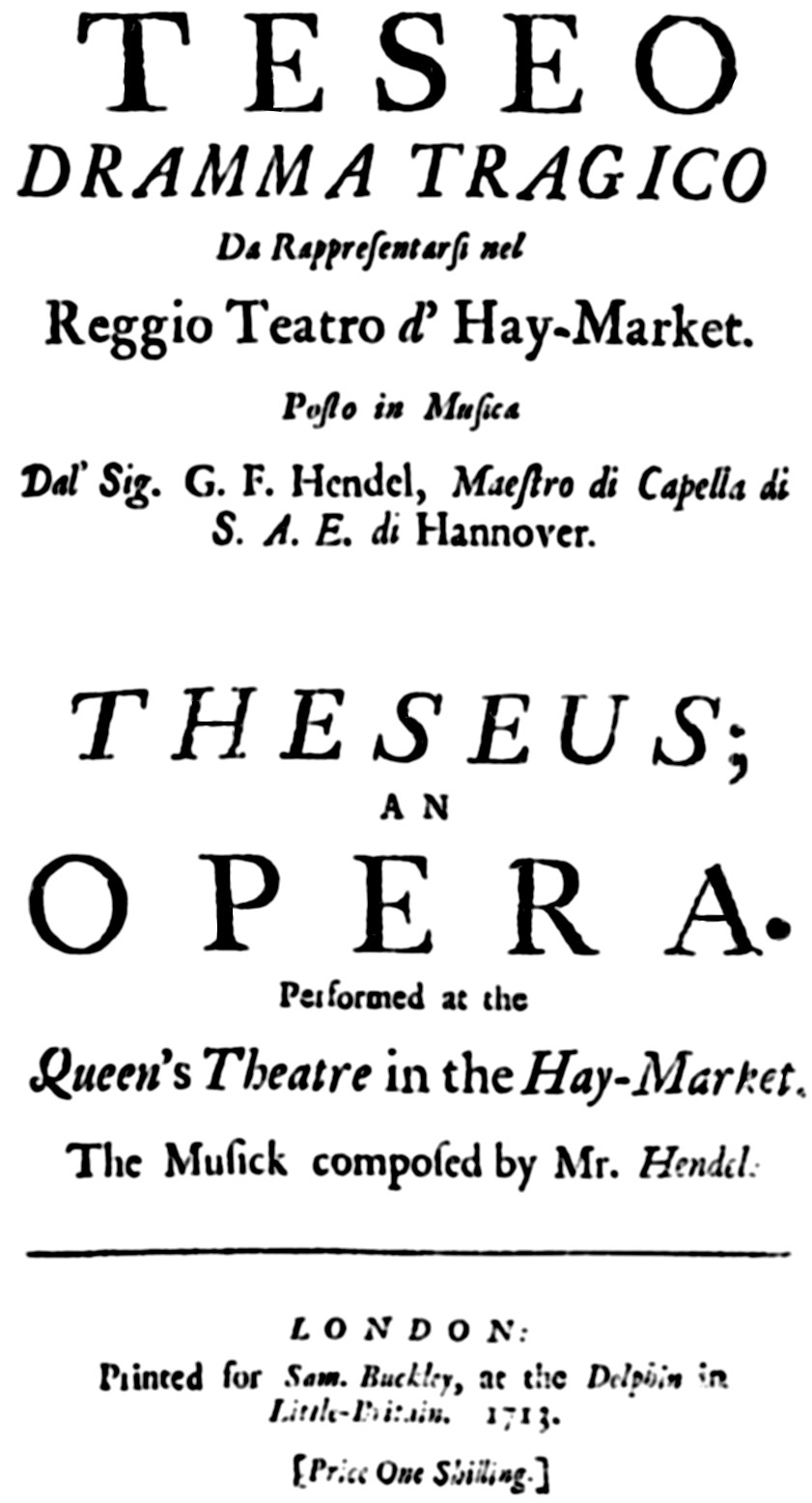
Title page of the libretto, 1713

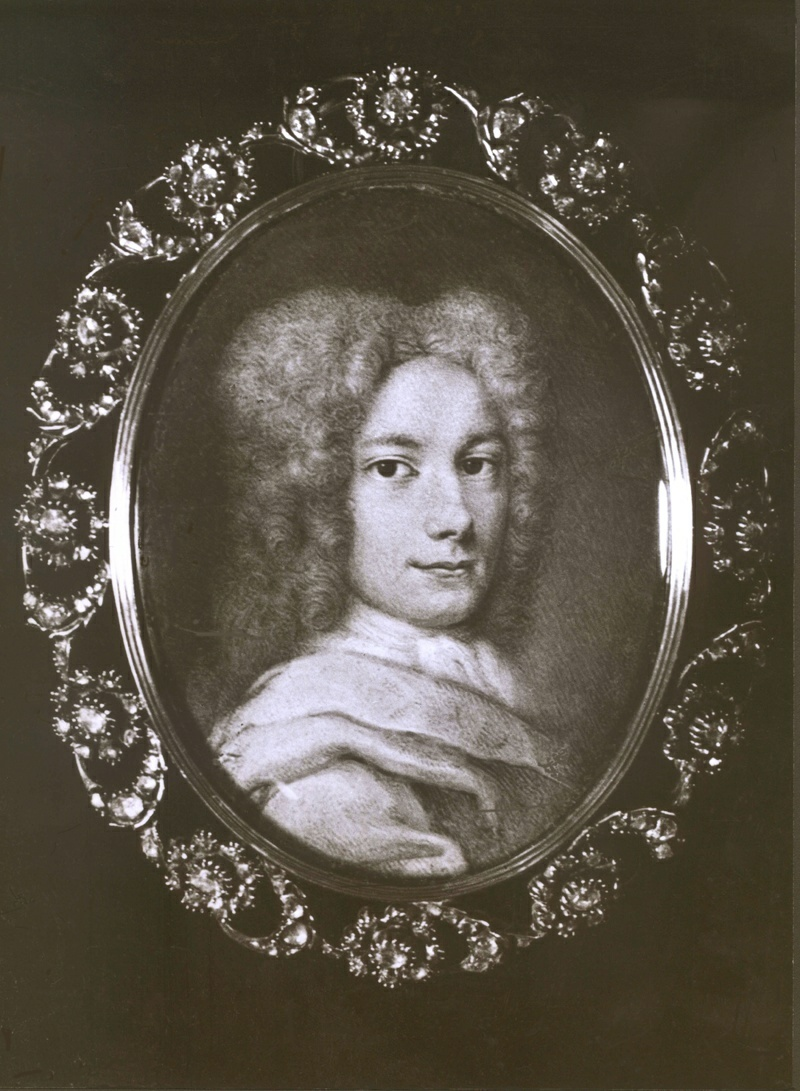
Händel c. 1710

Teseo ("Theseus", HWV 9; Italian pronunciation: [teˈzɛo]) is an opera seria with music by George Frideric Handel, the only Handel opera that is in five acts. The Italian-language libretto was by Nicola Francesco Haym, after Philippe Quinault's Thésée. It was Handel's third London opera, intended to follow the success of Rinaldo after the unpopular Il pastor fido.

First performed on 10 January 1713,Teseo featured "magical" effects such as flying dragons, transformation scenes and apparitions and had a cast of notable Italian opera singers. It was a success with London audiences, receiving thirteen performances even though the stage machinery for the "magical" effects broke down, and would have received more performances had not one of the theatre's managers run away with the box office receipts.

== Performance history ==
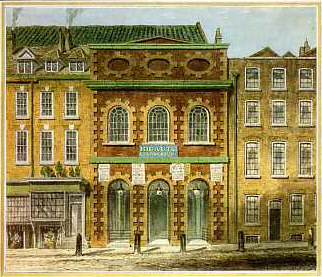
The Queen's Theatre, London, where Teseo had its first performance.

The opera was premiered at the Queen's Theatre in the Haymarket on 10 January 1713. It received an additional 12 performances through 16 May 1713, a mark of success at those times. The singers included the castratos Valeriano Pellegrini and Valentino Urbani. Between 1713 and 1984, there were only two revivals, the first being the revival under Fritz Lehmann in Göttingen on 29 June 1947. As with all Baroque opera seria, Teseo went unperformed for many years, but with the revival of interest in Baroque music and historically informed musical performance since the 1960s,Teseo, like all Handel operas, receives performances at festivals and opera houses today. Among other productions, the Handel Festival, Halle performed the work in 2003, the Frankfurt Opera mounted a production in 2013, and the work received a staging at the Theater an der Wien in 2018.

== Roles ==
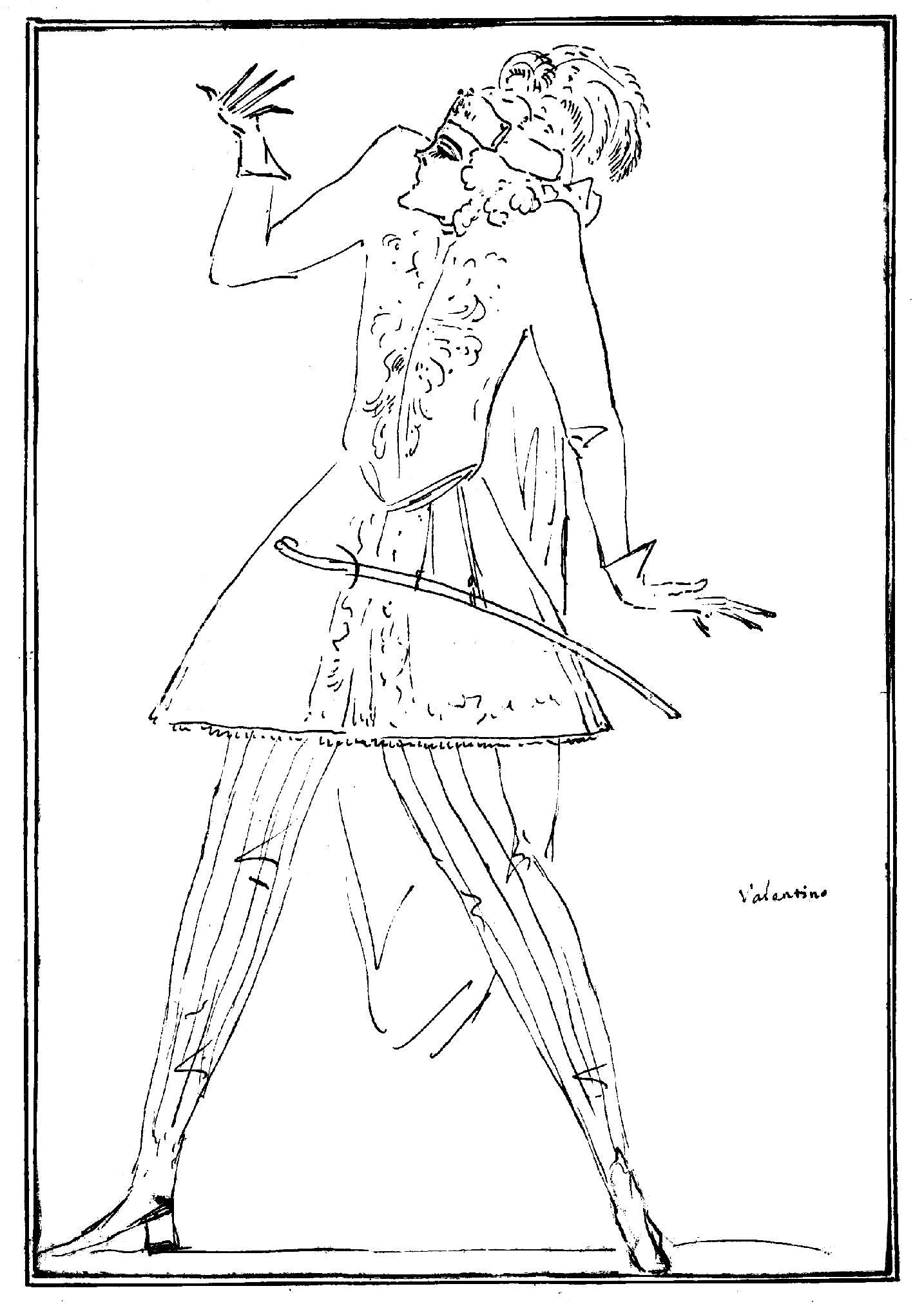
Caricature of Valentino Urbani, who created the role of Egeo.

Roles, voice types, and premiere cast
Role	Voice type	Premiere Cast, 10 January 1713
Teseo (Theseus)	soprano castrato	Valeriano Pellegrini
King Egeo (Aegeus)	alto castrato	Valentino Urbani ("Valentini")
Princess Agilea	soprano	Francesca Margherita de L'Epine
Clizia	soprano	Maria Gallia-Saggione
Arcane	contralto	Jane Barbier
Medea	soprano	Elisabetta Pilotti-Schiavonetti
Priest of the goddess Minerva	bass	Richard Leveridge

== Synopsis ==
- Scene:Athens, in legendary antiquity

King Egeo of Athens, years before the action begins, had sent away his baby son to a far-off land. Now a grown man, the hero Teseo is fighting on behalf of Athens, his identity as the king's son unknown to himself or others.

=== Act 1 ===
Teseo is engaged in battle against Athens' foes as the opera begins. Princess Agilea, the ward of King Egeo, is concerned for Teseo's safety, as she confides to her companion the young maiden Clizia, for Agilea has fallen hopelessly in love with Teseo. Clizia has a boyfriend, Arcane, whom she promises to love always, but when she asks him to find out what he can about Teseo's safety, he becomes jealous.

The Athenians have been victorious in battle, and King Egeo declares that his announced marriage to Medea, a sorceress, is now no longer suitable for such a mighty sovereign as himself and he will take Princess Agilea as his bride. Agilea bewails her cruel fate, having no wish to be a Queen, but to be allowed to marry the man she loves, Teseo.

=== Act 2 ===
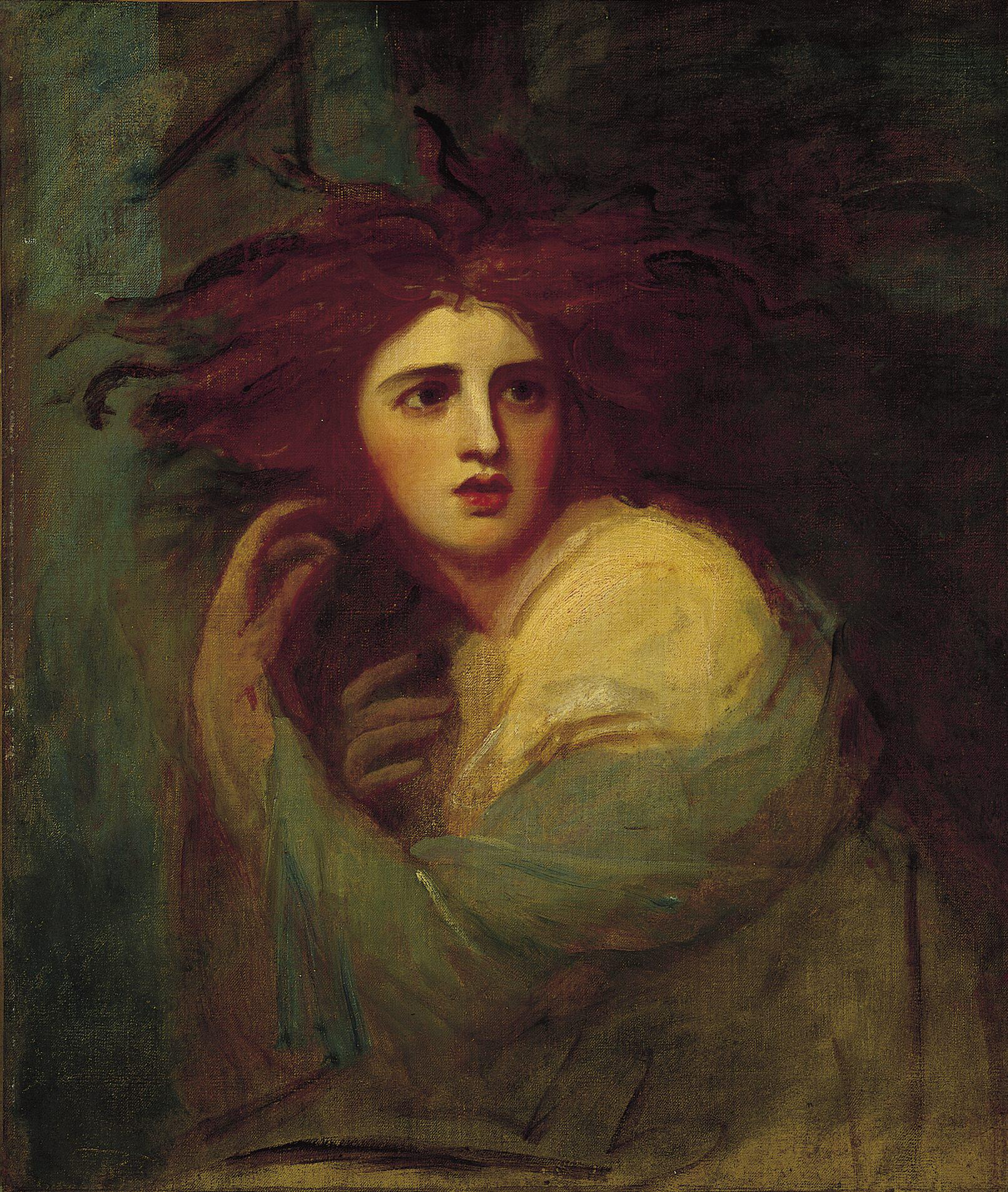
George Romney – Lady Hamilton as Medea.

Medea is furious at the humiliation caused to her by the King's rejection; she is somewhat mollified when the King comes to her and suggests she marry the hero Teseo instead of him as she is in fact in love with Teseo already.

Arcane, who is jealous of Teseo because of his misinterpretation of his sweetheart Clizia's concern for him, warns the King not to trust Teseo who, Arcane suggests, will want to throw Egeo off the throne and take his place now that he has become such a military hero.

Medea meanwhile sows seeds of distrust in Teseo's mind – the King is jealous of him, Medea says, and only she knows how to treat the King to allay this bad feeling. Teseo tells Medea he trusts her to put the situation right. Medea, full of hatred, vows revenge for the insults she has suffered.

=== Act 3 ===
Arcane has decided to put his jealousy behind him and seek marriage to Clizia.

The King, learning that Agilea is in love not with him but with Teseo, does not wish to force her to marry him and has given his consent for Agilea and Teseo to be united. The lovers are overjoyed at this news but Medea, insulted and rejected once more, bursts into the room where Agilea and Teseo are celebrating their reunion and, by casting spells, changes the scene to a desert full of terrifying apparitions who carry Agilea away.

=== Act 4 ===
The King is told by Arcane of how the witch Medea spirited Agilea away. The horrified Egeo swears she will be punished.

In the enchanted realm where Agilea is captive, Medea tells her she must agree to marry the King instead of Teseo, or the hero will meet his death. Medea shows her a vision of the sleeping Teseo, menaced by specters about to kill him. Agilea agrees to renounce him and marry the King instead to save Teseo's life, whereupon Medea transforms the scene to a paradisaical realm where Teseo hears Agilea's voice tearfully telling him she no longer loves him. Agilea's sorrow moves the heart of Medea who informs the lovers she will no longer attempt to part them, to the joy of Teseo and Agilea.

=== Act 5 ===
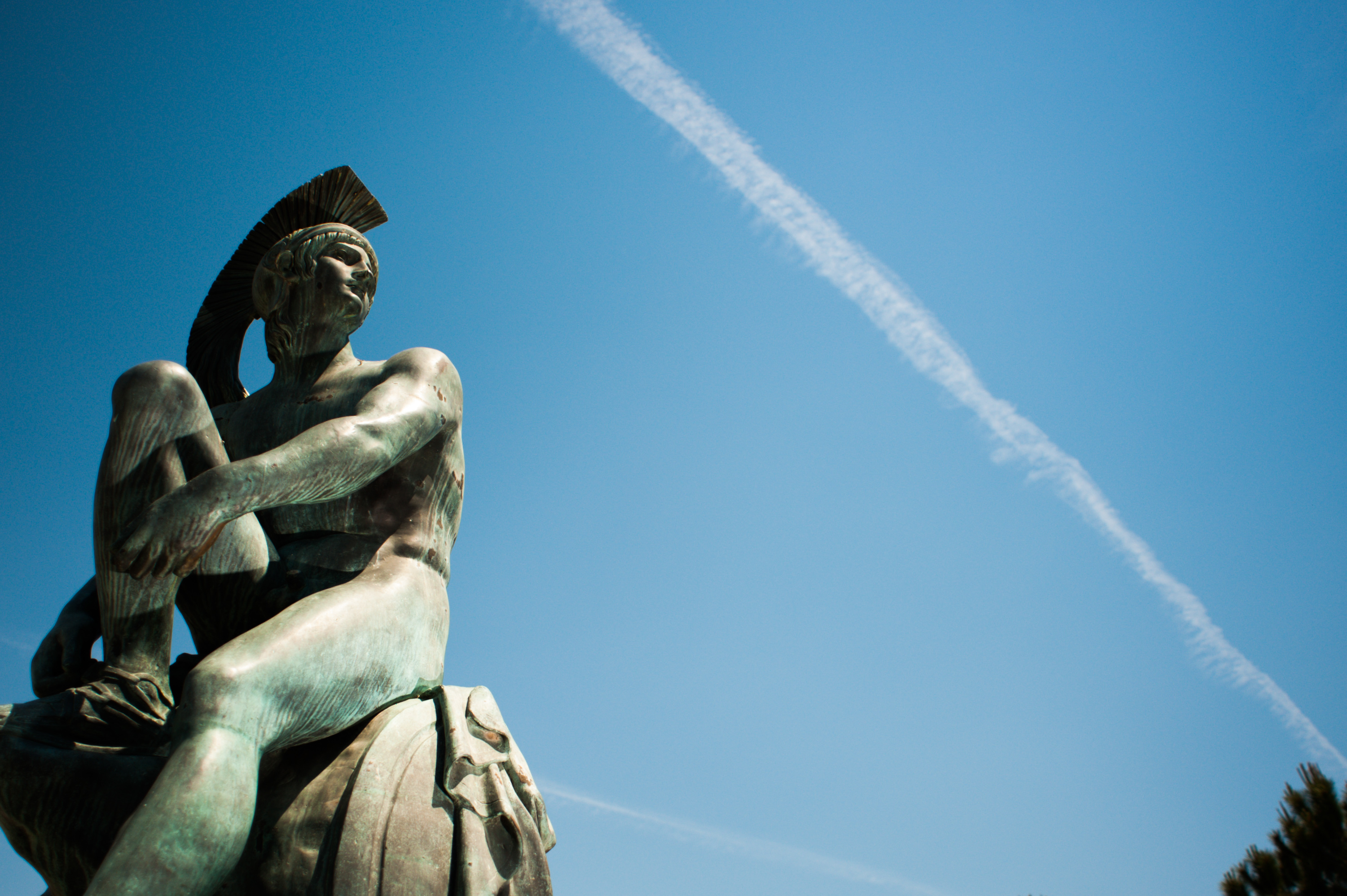
Statue of Theseus, Syntagma Square, Athens.

Medea's sympathy for Teseo and Agilea's love did not last long; once again tormented by jealousy, she has convinced the King that Teseo is a threat to his throne and gives the King poison to put in Teseo's drink.

Teseo and Agilea enter with their friends, celebrating their marriage. The King offers to drink to their happiness and gives Teseo the poisoned drink to toast with in return. Teseo draws his sword to swear his loyalty to the King and is about to drink the poisoned beverage when the King recognises the sword as the one he had sent with his baby son years before so that he would be able to recognise him when grown up. The King dashes the cup from Teseo's hand and embraces him as his son. Not only will Teseo and Agilea now live in married happiness, Arcane and Clizia can marry too. The enraged Medea appears on a flying chariot drawn by fire-breathing dragons. Swearing vengeance, she orders the dragons to set the palace on fire, but the goddess Minerva descends from heaven, banishes Medea, and blesses the King, the two pairs of lovers, and Athens.

== Context and analysis ==
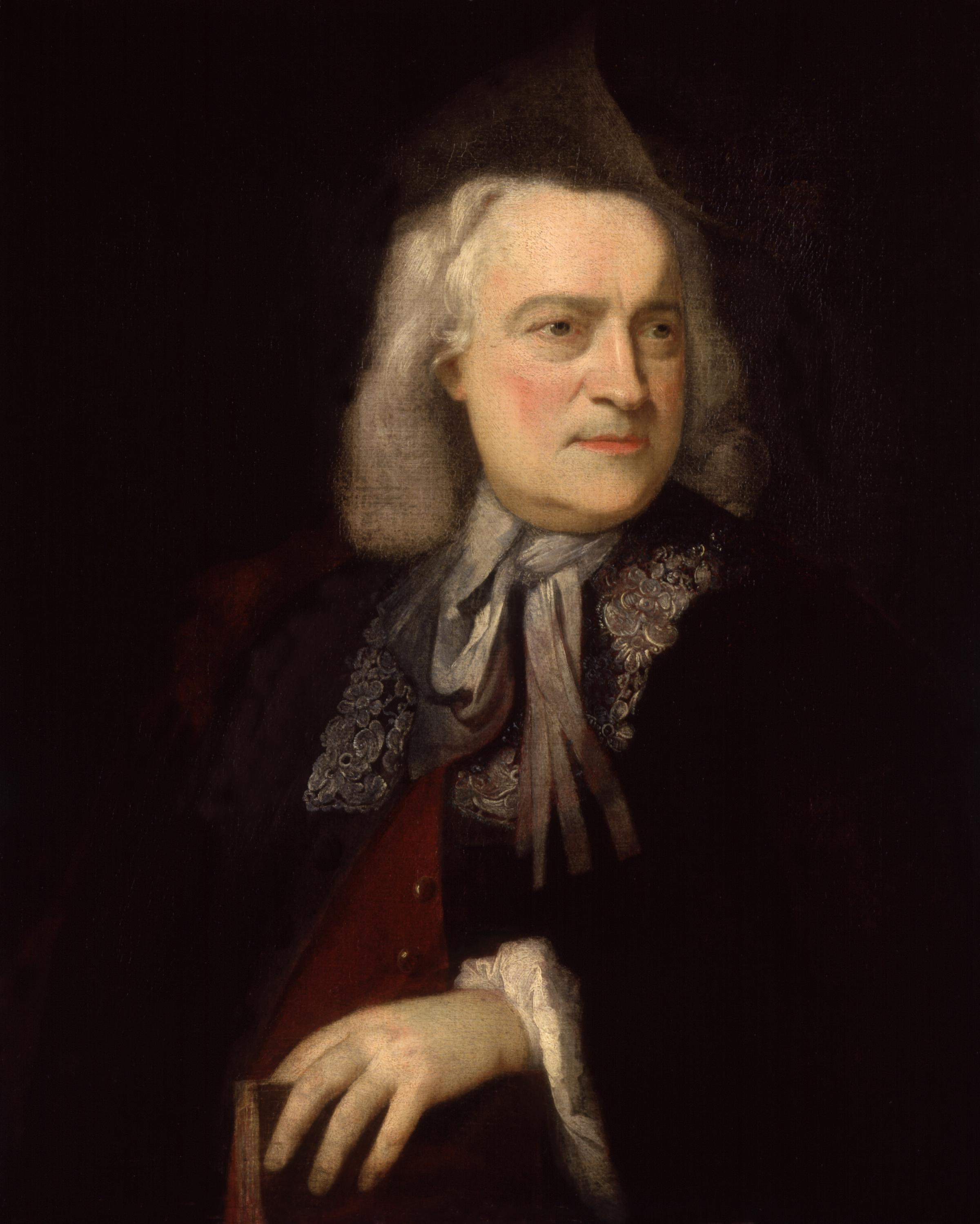
Owen Swiny by Peter van Bleeck, 1737 (National Portrait Gallery).

The German-born Handel, after spending some of his early career composing operas and other pieces in Italy, settled in London, where in 1711 he had brought Italian opera for the first time with his opera Rinaldo. A tremendous success, Rinaldo created a craze in London for Italian opera seria, a form focused overwhelmingly on solo arias for the star virtuoso singers. Rinaldo, a "magic" opera featuring enchantments, sorceresses and scenic ingenuity, had been followed by Il Pastor Fido, a shorter and simpler opera, which was not a success with London audiences at its first performances. Therefore, Handel returned to the "magic" form with Teseo, for the first and only time in his many operas using a five-act structure instead of the usual three, and deviating from the convention in Italian opera seria that singers performed their arias and then left the stage. These differences are due to the fact that Teseo uses an adaptation of a French libretto written by Philippe Quinault for Jean-Baptiste Lully,Thésée, presented in Paris in 1675.

After the second performance theatre manager Owen Swiny stole the box office receipts and disappeared, leaving the musicians unpaid. The singers decided to continue the run however, splitting the costs and profits between themselves. Handel does not seem to have held a grudge against Swiny, as he later acted as an agent for Italian opera singers in Handel's London operas.

The stage machinery for the special "magic" effects did not always function smoothly, as can be seen by a notice put into a London newspaper on 24 January:

'This present Saturday...the Opera of Theseus by Mr. Hendel will be represented in its Perfection, that is to say with all the Scenes, Decorations, Flights, and Machines. The Performers are much concerned that they did not give the Nobility and Gentry all the satisfaction they could have wished, when they represented it on Wednesday, having been hindered by some unforeseen Accidents at that time insurmountable.

Teseo has a rich orchestration, with the usual strings, oboes, bassoon and continuo instruments of Handel's opera orchestra augmented by flutes and trumpets. The singer Elisabetta Pilotti-Schiavonetti in the role of Medea, who specialised in playing sorceresses, and for whom Handel had written the similar part of Armida in Rinaldo and later the role of Melissa in Amadigi di Gaula was the star of the show, and Handel's music distinguishes between her vengeful character and that of the other leading female part, the sweet Princess Agilea.

18th century musicologist Charles Burney wrote of the accompanied recitatives for Medea:

in which the wild and savage fury of the enraged sorceress, Medea, and her incantations, are admirably painted by the instruments.

== Recordings ==
=== Audio recordings ===
Teseo discography, audio recordings
Year	Cast: Teseo, Medea, Egeo, Agilea Clizia, Arcane	Conductor, orchestra	Label
1992	Eirian James, Della Jones, Derek Lee Ragin, Julia Gooding, Catherine Napoli, Jeffrey Gall	Marc Minkowski, Les Musiciens du Louvre	Audio CD:Erato, Cat: 2292 45806-2
2009	Franco Fagioli, Helene Schneiderman, Kai Wessel, Jutta Maria Böhnert, Olga Polyakova, Matthias Rexroth	Konrad Junghänel, Staatsorchester Stuttgart	Audio CD:Carus, Cat:83437

=== Video Recording ===
Teseao discography, video recording
Year	Cast: Teseo, Medea, Egeo, Agilea Clizia, Arcane	Conductor, orchestra	Producer	Label
2004	Jacek Laszczkowski, Maria Riccarda Wesseling, Martin Wölfel, Sharon Rostorf-Zamir, Miriam Meyer, Thomas Diestler	Wolfgang Katschner, Lautten Compagney	Axel Köhler	DVD:Arthaus Musik, Cat: 100 708
