= Françoise Prévost =

Françoise Prévost may refer to:

- Françoise Prévost (dancer)
- Françoise Prévost (actress)

== See also ==
- François Prévost, Canadian documentary filmmaker
