= Il pastor fido (Handel) =

Opera seria by George Frideric Handel

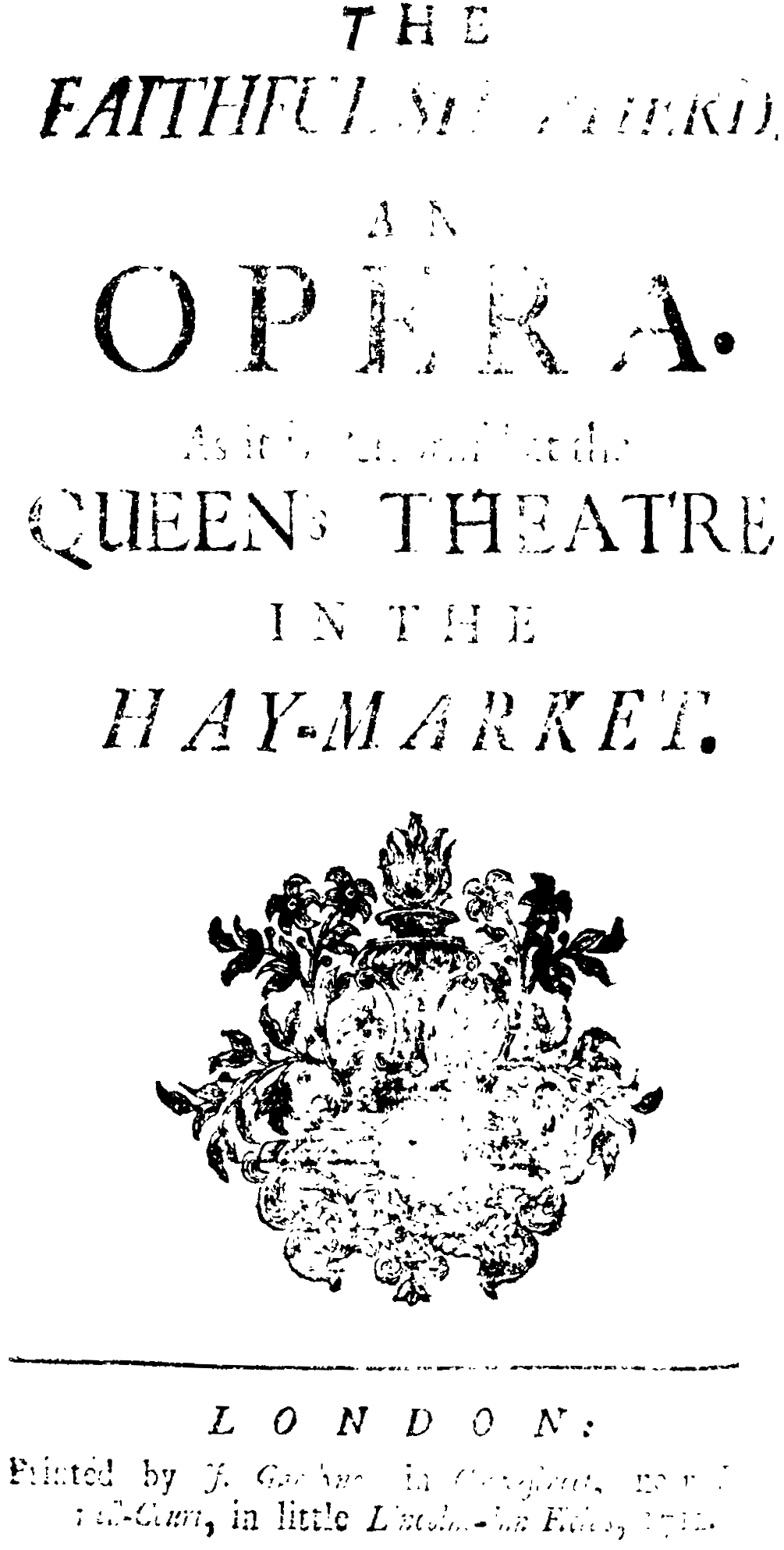
title page of the libretto

Il pastor fido ("The Faithful Shepherd") (HWV 8) is an opera seria in three acts by George Frideric Handel. It was set to a libretto by Giacomo Rossi based on the famed and widely familiar pastoral poem of the Il pastor fido by Giovanni Battista Guarini. It had its first performance on 22 November 1712 at the Queen's Theatre in the Haymarket, London.

== Performance history ==
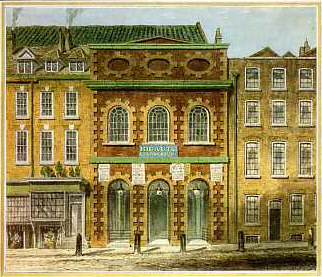
The Queen's Theatre, London, where Il Pastor Fido had its first performance

It was composed in 1712 and first performed on 22 November of the same year under the composer. The opera opened to a largely hostile reception, probably due to disappointment after the success of Rinaldo: one diarist noted critically that "the scene represented only the Country of Arcadia; the Habits [costumes] were old – the Opera short". The roles of Mirtillo and Silvio were originally sung by the castratos Valeriano Pellegrini and Valentino Urbani. The overture is in six movements and is long for its time: it is thought that it may have been originally composed as an unrelated orchestral suite.

The revival of the spring of 1734, in which Giovanni Carestini took the role of Mirtillo, was far more successful, but Handel significantly altered the music: only seven of the original arias remained, and those cut were replaced by arias from Handel's cantatas or earlier operas. This production proved popular and enjoyed a run of 13 performances. In the winter of 1734 Il pastor fido was revived again: Carestini remained as Mirtillo and the English tenor John Beard took the role of Silvio. A newly composed prologue, Terpsicore, was added to the opera for this run of performances. The prologue consisted of solo arias, choral movements, and orchestral writing for dance: the danced role of Terpsichore was performed by Marie Sallé, whose dance company had been engaged by Covent Garden manager John Rich.

As with all Baroque opera seria, Il Pastor Fido went unperformed for many years, but with the revival of interest in Baroque music and historically informed musical performance since the 1960s,Il Pastor Fido, like all Handel operas, receives performances at festivals and opera houses today. Among other performances, the work was performed as part of the London Handel Festival in 2012 and by the Handel Festival Halle in 2019.

== Roles ==
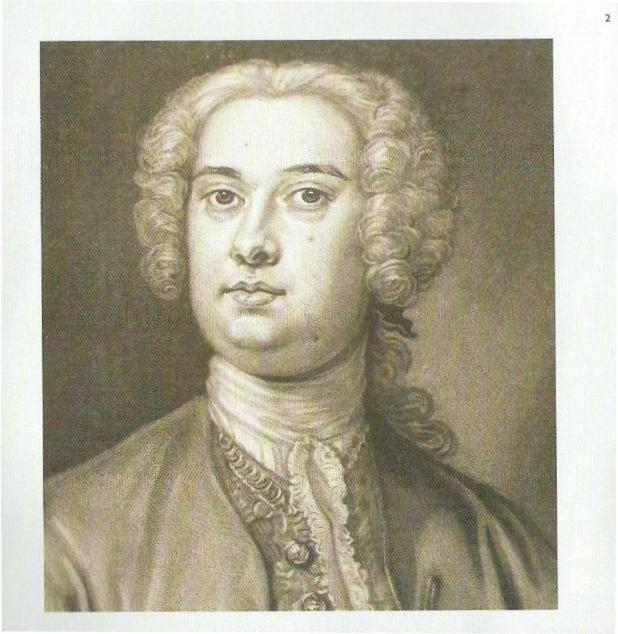
Giovanni Carestini, who sang the role of Mirtillo in the 1734 revivals

Roles, voice types, and premiere cast
| Role | Voice type | Premiere Cast, 22 November 1712 | Revised version, 18 May 1734 | Revival 9 November 1734 |
|---|---|---|---|---|
| Amarilli | soprano | Elisabetta Pilotti-Schiavonetti | Anna Maria Strada | Anna Maria Strada |
| Dorinda | contralto | Jane Barbier | Maria Caterina Negri | Maria Caterina Negri |
| Eurilla | soprano | Francesca Margherita de L'Epine | Margherita Durastanti | Maria Rosa Negri |
| Mirtillo | soprano castrato | Valeriano Pellegrini | Giovanni Carestini | Giovanni Carestini |
| Silvio | alto castrato | Valentino Urbani ("Valentini") | Carlo Scalzi | John Beard |
| Tirenio | bass | Richard Leveridge | Gustavus Waltz | Gustavus Waltz |

== Synopsis ==
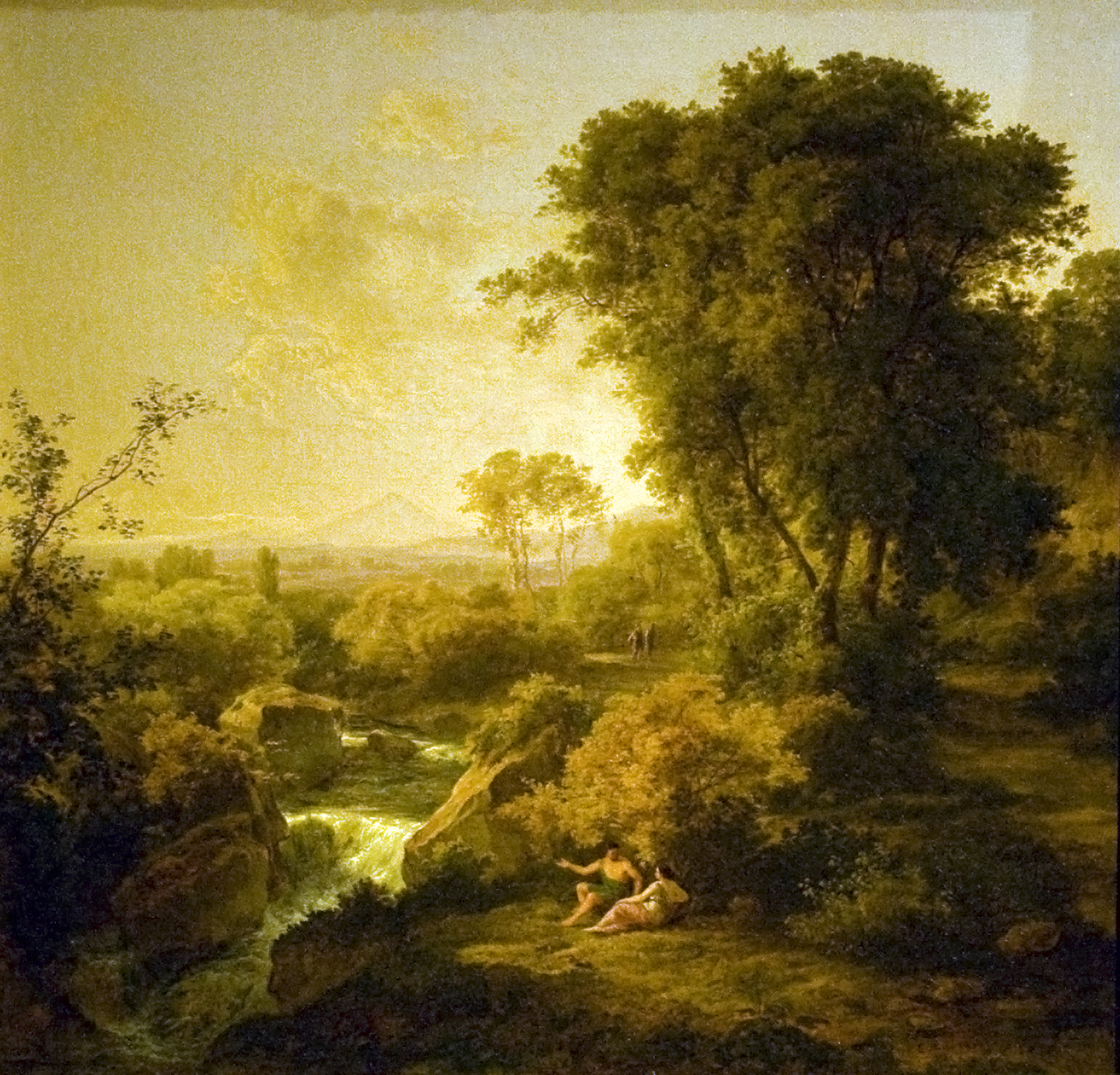
Arcadia

Scene: Arcadia, in the Greek countryside, in legendary antiquity.

Diana, virgin huntress goddess, has become displeased with Arcadia and has let it be known that only through the marriage of a couple descended from heavenly ancestors, one of whom will be "a faithful shepherd", will her wrath be appeased. The couple who are believed to fit this description are the hunter Silvio, but he has no interest in love, being dedicated to Diana and only interested in hunting, and the shepherdess Amarilli, who however is in love with the shepherd Mirtillo, whose ancestry is unknown.

=== Act 1 ===
The shepherd Mirtillo is unhappy due to his great love for Amarilli, who is going to have to marry the hunter Silvio in order to please the goddess Diana.

Amarilli is also unhappy about her proposed marriage as she has fallen in love with Mirtillo, whose family background is not known, although she has not told him she loves him. Mirtillo overhears her lamenting her love for him and woos her, but she rejects him as her duty is to marry Silvio for the sake of the common welfare.

Mirtillo is in such despair at this that he resolves on suicide. The shepherdess Eurilla is also in love with Mirtillo, prevents him from killing himself, and offers to try to win Amarilli for him. Eurilla is really only interested in winning Mirtillo for herself.

Silvio, the hunter, has no interest in girls or getting married at all, he wishes to remain chaste like his patroness the goddess Diana. Yet another shepherdess, Dorinda, is smitten with Silvio but he rejects her love, to her sorrow.

=== Act 2 ===
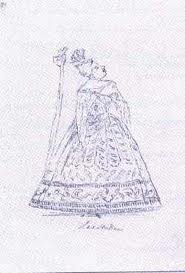
Caricature of Anna Maria Strada, who sang the role of Amarilli in the 1734 revivals

In a rocky grove, Mirtillo sings himself to sleep with a song in praise of his beloved Amarilli. As he slumbers, Eurilla enters with a garland of flowers with a note "From someone who adores you and is waiting for you there" and places it on his body. When he awakes, he thinks it must be from Amarilli.

Eurilla tells Amarilli that Mirtillo has received a love token and an invitation to an amorous tryst from another girl, which makes her very jealous.

Meanwhile, Dorinda continues to pester Silvio with her protestations of affection, and he continues to make it clear he is not interested.

Eurilla tells Mirtillo that his love is on her way and he should go into the nearby cave and wait for her, which he does. Eurilla then fetches Amarilli and tells her she can watch what Mirtillo is up to with the other girl from inside the same cave, and leads Amarilli into it too. Now that the two are in the cave together, Eurilla will go and tell the law authorities to arrest them for illicit sex, for which Arcadian law prescribes death for the female partner, Amarilli will be executed, and then Eurilla will have Mirtillo for her own.

=== Act 3 ===
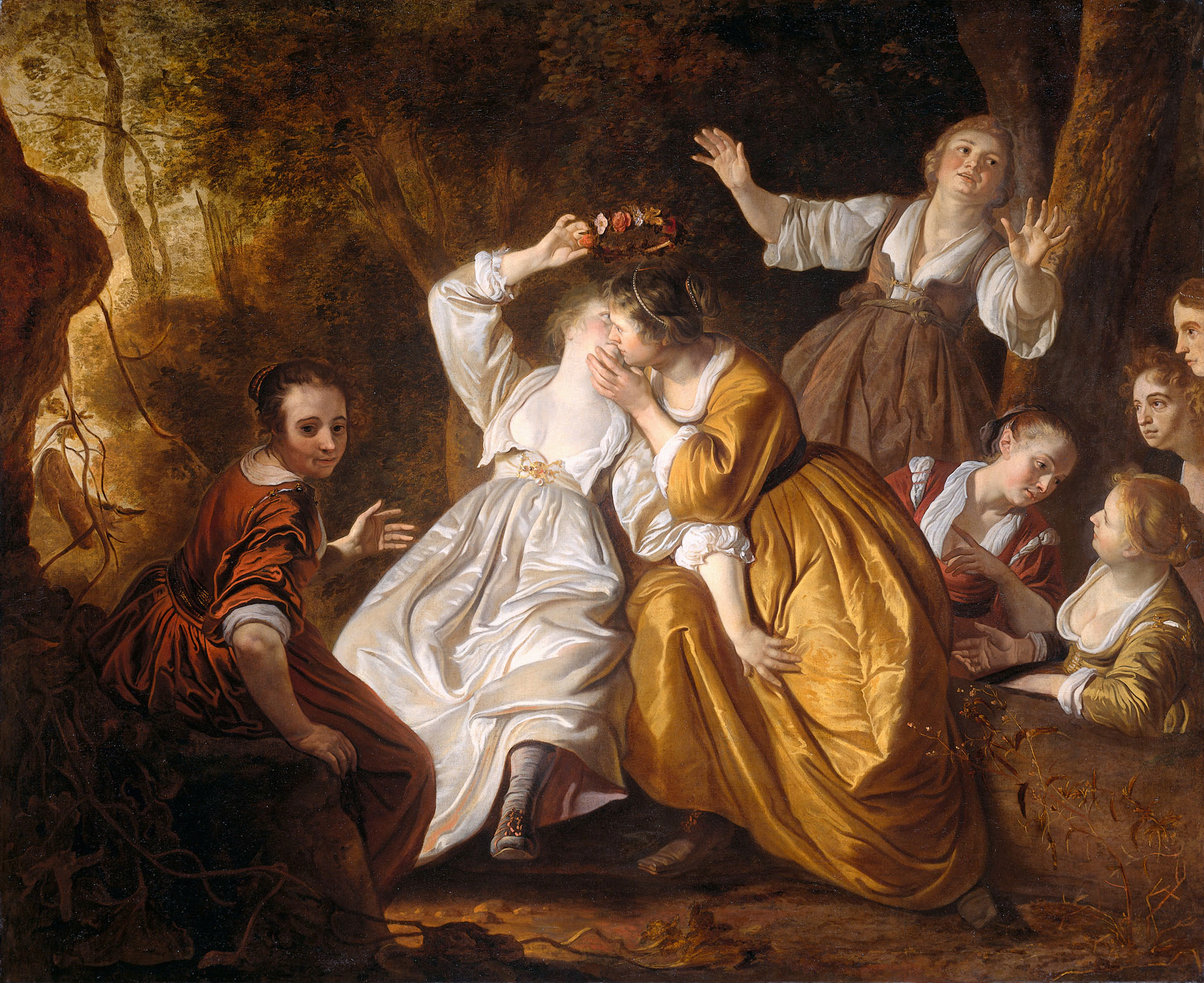
Amarillis Crowning Mirtillo

In the sacred grove outside the temple of Diana, the lovesick Dorinda hears her Silvio coming with his fellow hunters and hides in the bushes to watch him. Silvio, seeing movement in the growth, thinks it is a deer and spears it, but he is sorry to find it is Dorinda, who is not dead but wounded. Silvio discovers he is overwhelmed with love with her after all and they vow to be one.

Eurilla's scheme has been successful - Amarilli has been condemned to die for unchastity. Mirtillo begs to be allowed to die in her place but he is refused. Amarilli is being led to her execution when the chief priest of Diana enters with a new decree from the goddess. Mirtillo is of divine parentage and is the "faithful shepherd" of the prophecy. Human sacrifice is abolished, a double wedding is announced, Mirtillo and Amarilli as well as Silvio and Dorinda. Eurilla asks for and receives forgiveness, the curse is lifted from the land, and all rejoice.

== Context and analysis ==
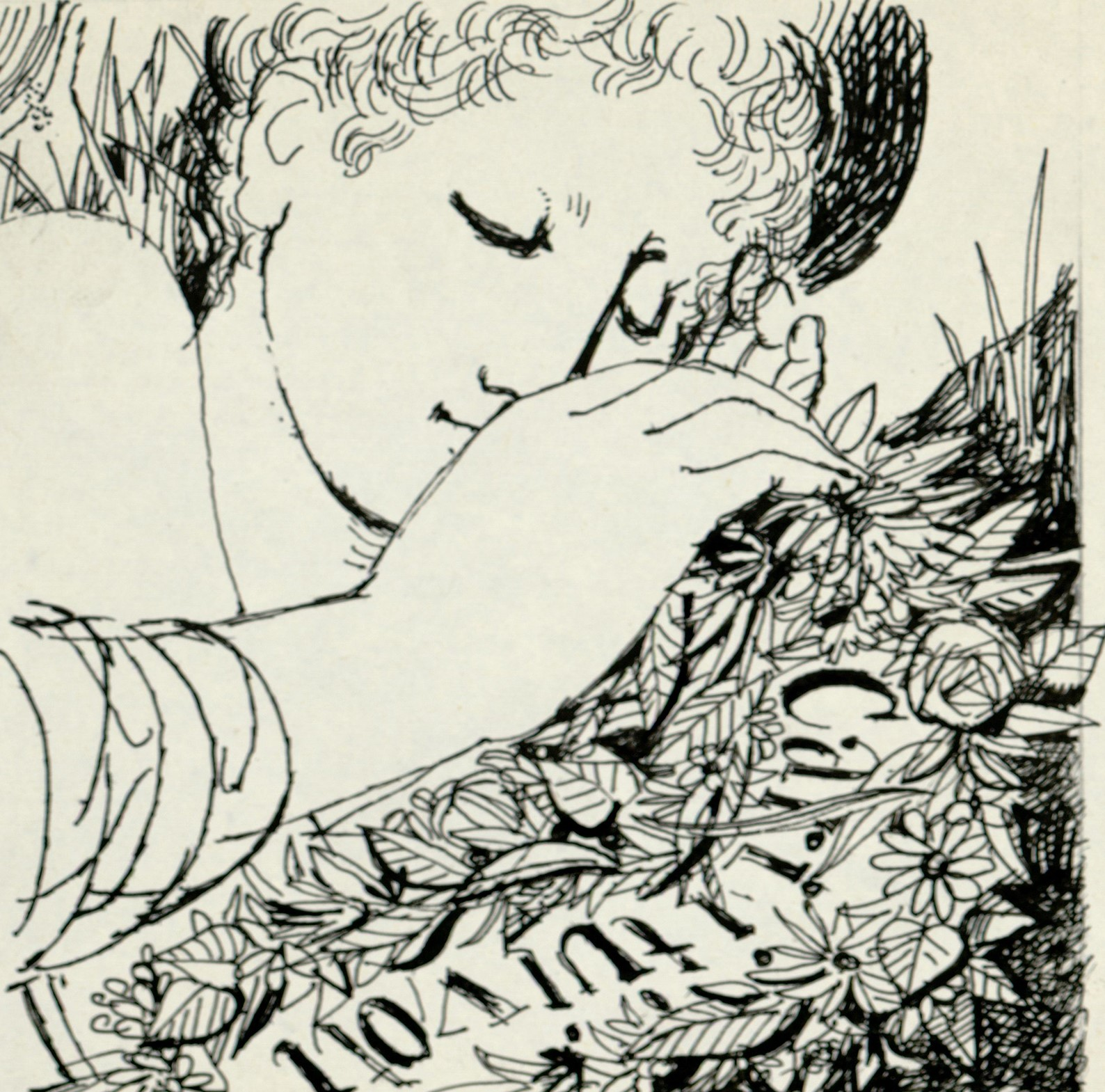
Illustration for Il pastor fido (undated).

The German-born Handel, after spending some of his early career composing operas and other pieces in Italy, settled in London, where in 1711 he had brought Italian opera for the first time with his opera Rinaldo. A tremendous success, Rinaldo created a craze in London for Italian opera seria, a form focused overwhelmingly on solo arias for the star virtuoso singers. Rinaldo, a "magic" opera featuring enchantments, sorceresses and scenic ingenuity, was followed by Il Pastor Fido, a shorter and simpler opera, which was not a success with London audiences at its first performances. The substantial revision of 1734, with the famed castrato Carestini, was much more successful, and the subsequent revival the same year featured dances by celebrated French ballerina Marie Sallé and her troupe, with specially composed music by Handel. 18th century musicologist Charles Burney wrote that Il Pastor Fido:

'upon the whole, is inferior in solidity and invention to almost all his other dramatic productions, yet there are in it many proofs of genius and abilities which must strike every real judge of the art, who is acquainted with the state of dramatic Music at the time it was composed.'

The opera is scored for two flutes, two oboes, bassoon, strings, and continuo (cello, lute, harpsichord) in the 1712 version and for two flutes, two oboes, bassoon, two horns, strings, and continuo in the 1734 version.

The second edition is notable for its extended overture. In six movements, it includes numerous contrasted sections and may originally have been intended for independent performance.

== Recordings ==
=== 1712 version ===
- Conductor:David Bates
- Singers: Anna Dennis (Mirtillo), Lucy Crowe (Amarilli), Katherine Manley (Eurilla), Clint van der Linde (Silvio), Madeleine Shaw (Dorinda), Lisandro Abadie (Tirenio)
- Orchestra:La Nuova Musica
- Year:2012
- Label:Harmonia Mundi Cat:907585.86, CD

=== 1734 version ===
- Conductor:Nicholas McGegan
- Singers:Paul Esswood (Mirtillo), Katalin Farkas (Amarilli), Maria Flohr (Eurilla), Gabor Kallay (Silvio), Marta Lukin (Dorinda), Jozsef Gregor (Tirenio)
- Orchestra:Capella Savaria
- Year:1988
- Label:Hungaroton Cat:HCD 12912-3

The overture was included in the 1986 album of Handel Overtures on Archiv Produktion, with The English Concert conducted by Trevor Pinnock, and is a popular stand-alone work for concerts or recordings.
