= Valeriano Pellegrini =

Italian opera singer

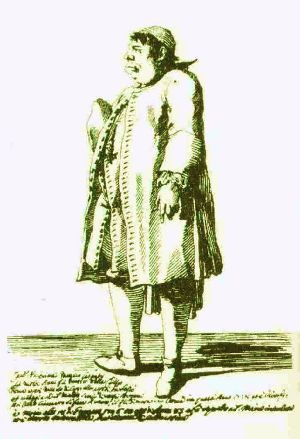
Valeriano Pellegrini caricatured

Valeriano Pellegrini (c. 1663 – 18 January 1746) was an Italian soprano castrato singer of the 18th century. He is largely remembered today for his association with the composer George Frideric Handel, for whom he sang in Italy and then later followed to London. He sang the role of Nero in Handel's opera Agrippina at the work's initial run in Venice (26 December 1709), a part that demanded a high level of technical skill.

His first performance in London was a concert at the Old Spring Garden in the April 1712, and during his time in London performed several roles in operas by Handel; among them Mirtillo in Il pastor fido (22 November 1712), the title role in Teseo (10 January 1713), and Lepidus in Silla (2 June 1713). Having lost his voice in 1728, he retired from singing and became a priest.
