= Claude Balon =

French dancer and choreographer

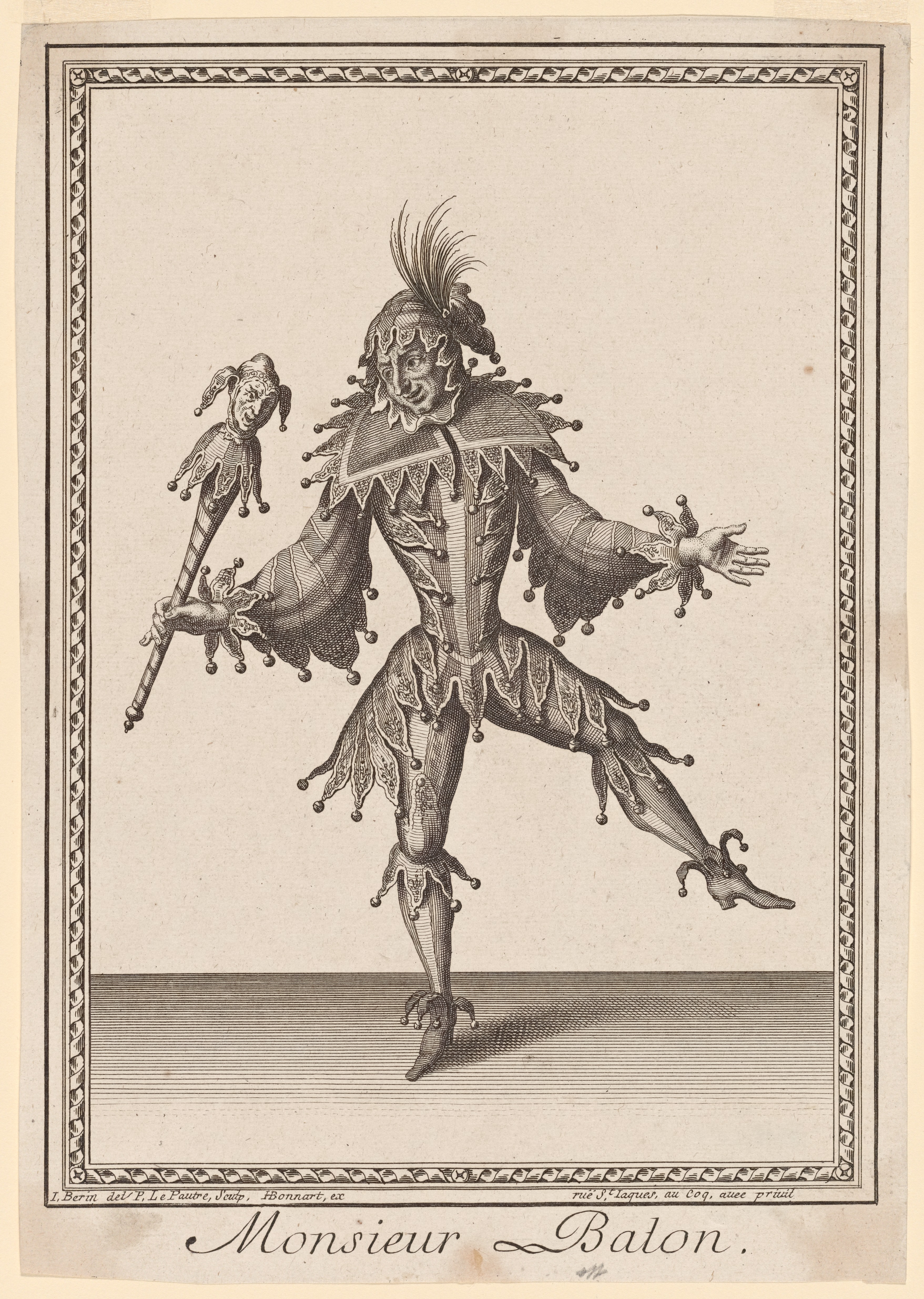
A print of Balon depicted as a harlequin or jester

Claude Balon (also Ballon, often incorrectly named Jean; 1671–1744) was a French dancer and choreographer. He is listed as a performer in 11 known choreographies, with the earliest during the reign of King William III, and was credited as the deviser of 23 published choreographies, with the first appearing in 1714 .

The ballet term ballon is sometimes said to be derived from his name, but Robert Greskovic calls this "dubious". Balon danced under the tutelage of the balletmaster Pierre Beauchamp at the Paris Opera. Marie Sallé is identified as a student of Balon's.

== Biography ==
For some unknown reason, he is mistakenly referred to as Jean in many works on the history of dance. Similarly, his dates of birth and death (1676-1739) do not correspond to anything reliable.

His father François and his grandfather Antoine were already court dance masters. Claude began his career at Versailles, Yvelines in 1686, in the Ballet de la Jeunesse, and continued his career as a performer at the Paris Opera, under the direction of Louis Pécour. From 1691 to 1710, he took part in the premieres and revivals of the major operas and opera-ballets by Lully, Campra, and Destouches. He performed in London in 1699 before King William III of England and took part in numerous performances at the court of Louis XIV.

After the death of Pierre Beauchamp (1705), he was appointed composer of the king's ballets in 1719 and, two years later, director of the Royal Academy of Dance. Among his students was Marie Sallé.

In 1715, Louis XIV chose him to tutor his great-grandson Louis XV, and he also became dance master to Marie Leszczyńska and the royal couple's children.

A rival of Michel Blondy, he was considered by his contemporaries to be one of the most graceful and skilled dancers of his time. His partners included Marie-Thérèse de Subligny and Françoise Prévost.

He participated with Françoise Prévost (dancer) in the performance of a character dance in Act IV of Pierre Corneille's Horace, a precursor to Noverre's ballet d'action, during the fourteenth Grande Nuit de Sceaux, a celebration held by the Duchess of Maine at her château in Sceaux. Among the knights of the Order of the Honeybee.
