= Sémiramis (Catel) =

Sémiramis is an opera by the composer Charles-Simon Catel. It takes the form of a tragédie lyrique in three acts. The French-language libretto by Philippe Desriaux is based on the 1748 tragedy of the same name by Voltaire, which concerns the legendary Queen Semiramis of Babylon. Sémiramis, Catel's first opera, premiered at the Paris Opéra on 4 May 1802. It enjoyed only limited success and suffered many attacks from critics. The composer had to wait until 1810 before the Paris Opéra gave him another opportunity with a new opera, Les bayadères, which was a triumph.

== Performance history ==
Sémiramis enjoyed 24 performances at the Opéra. Several factors played a part in its lacklustre reception. Catel was Professor of Harmony at the newly founded Paris Conservatoire, a position which had already made him enemies. The high standards the Conservatoire imposed led to the dismissal of members of staff who failed to meet them. Some took the opportunity of the premiere of Catel's first opera to get their revenge. As Fétis explained in his biographical article on the composer:

Catel, known to be close to the director, Sarrette, and therefore likely to influence the school's policies, was in a particularly vulnerable position. This probably explains why Catel experienced such difficulties when he made his début as a composer of dramatic works, and why there existed a discrepancy between his great talent and his meagre fame; for, although he had devoted friends among the theatre artistes and members of the orchestra, his enemies were numerous among the audience in the stalls, whence no doubt the hostility he was shown when Sémiramis was staged in 1802. Such a time of violent hatred was not propitious to his work; so it was not a success, despite a score containing many very beautiful elements.

There were also problems with the cast. Catel wrote the part of Sémiramis for mezzo-soprano, "almost a novelty for the era". The Opéra management assigned the title role to their leading soprano Maillard, but she was unable to cope and withdrew after only a few performances.

On the other hand, reviewers admired the set designs by Charles Percier. One journalist praised the "extraordinary splendour of the décors" and "the amazing richness and variety of the costumes, shining with gold and silver."

== Libretto and music ==
The choice of libretto was part of the vogue for setting French Classical tragedies which had begun under Louis XVI with such works as Grétry's Andromaque (based on Racine). The fashion continued in France until the failure of Spontini's Olimpie, based on another tragedy by Voltaire, in 1819. Critics argued whether Sémiramis was a suitable subject for an opera. Some found it too morbid: "Horror and atrocity are not conducive to melody." Others found that the tragedy's "theatrical pomp" offered ideal opportunities to a composer. In fact, Voltaire's Sémiramis later formed the basis of the libretto to one of Rossini's most admired tragic operas, Semiramide (1823). Reviewers accused Desriaux of butchering Voltaire's play. The Comédie-Française decided to stage Voltaire's original tragedy at the same time, allowing comparisons between the two.

Some critics also complained that Catel's music was unmelodic compared to the works of Antonio Sacchini and Niccolò Piccinni, which had been favourites at the Paris Opéra. This was because Catel was more influenced by the musical style pioneered at the Opéra Comique during the 1790s by composers such as Luigi Cherubini, Étienne Méhul and Jean-François Lesueur. In particular, Cherubini's Médée (1797) may have served as a model. Detractors of this dramatic style dismissed it as no more than "declamation and noise", but it found admirers among the new generation of Romantics. Catel and Desriaux move the action along by including few solo arias, though there are many ensembles.

Later critics have been more enthusiastic about Sémiramis. Fétis wrote that it contained "many beautiful elements". E.J. Dent called it "a work of great dignity, with remarkable premonitions of Romanticism" and David Charlton has observed, "The doom-laden atmosphere of the plot is well captured throughout the score."

The overture is sometimes performed separately. David Charlton sees similarities between it and Ludwig van Beethoven's Egmont overture.

== Roles ==
Cast	Voice type	Premiere
Sémiramis, Queen of Babylon	mezzo-soprano	Marie-Thérèse Davoux, called Mlle Maillard
Arzace, or Ninias, son of Sémiramis	tenor	Nicolas Roland
Azéma, a princess of the family of Bélus	soprano	Rose-Timoléone-Caroline Chevalier de Lavit, called Mme Branchu
Assur, a prince of the family of Bélus	basse-taille (bass-baritone)	Auguste-Athanase (Augustin) Chéron
Oroès, high priest	basse-taille (bass-baritone)	Dufresne
Otane, a favourite of Sémiramis	mute (?)	
Cédar, friend of Assur	tenor	
L'ombre de Ninus (The ghost of Ninus)	bass	
Chorus: Guards, Magi, Slaves, Attendants

== Synopsis ==
The scene is Babylon.

Act 1

Azéma sings of her love for Arzace. Queen Sémiramis enters in a troubled state. The ghost of her murdered husband Ninus has appeared to her demanding revenge for himself and their son Ninias, who has disappeared without trace. The act ends with a military parade and celebrations.

Act 2

Azéma declares her love to Arzace but warns him of Assur, who is trying to force her to marry him. Assur appears and quarrels with Arzace. He warns Arzace that he will kill him, just as he did with Ninus and Ninias.

The scene changes to the outside of the tomb of Ninus. Sémiramis announces her intention to remarry: her choice is Arzace. This horrifies Azéma, but even more so the high priest Oroès, who has recognised that Arzace is really Sémiramis' lost son Ninias. The ghost of Ninus appears and proclaims that Arzace will reign in Babylon, but only after he has descended into the tomb to avenge Ninus' death.

Act 3

Assur and a band of followers plot to kill Arzace and capture Sémiramis. They hide as Azéma and Arzace enter. Azéma is angry but Arzace convinces her that he knew nothing of the queen's plan to marry him. Oroès tells Arzace he is really Ninias. He reveals that Assur murdered Ninus on the orders of Sémiramis, but Ninias managed to escape. Oroes leaves. When Sémiramis arrives, Arzace tells her he knows the truth. She tells him to kill her but first Arzace decides to enter the tomb. Azéma enters and warns Sémiramis that Assur and his men are hiding in the tomb, waiting to kill Arzace. Sémiramis rushes into the tomb to save him and re-emerges, bleeding to death. In the darkness, Arzace has mistaken her for Assur and unwittingly killed his own mother. Sémiramis forgives her son then dies.

== Recording ==
- Sémiramis Maria Riccarda Wesseling (Sémiramis), Gabrielle Philiponnet (Azéma), Arzace (Mathias Vidal), Le Concert Spirituel, conducted by Hervé Niquet (Glossa, 2012)

== Sources ==
- Booklet notes to the Niquet recording by Alexandre Dratwicki
- Edward Joseph Dent, The Rise of Romantic Opera (Cambridge University Press, 1979 edition)
- Fétis, François-Joseph: biographical article on Catel reprinted in the book accompanying the recording of Catel's opera Les bayadères by Didier Talpain (Ediciones Singulares, 2014)
- Holden, Amanda (ed.), The Viking Opera Guide (Viking, 1993)
- Pougin, Arthur: introduction to the 1881 edition of Catel's Les bayadères (available online at Archive.org)
- Vinciguerra, Jean-Michel, "Les Mystères d’Isis ou l’Égypte antique d’après les décorateurs de l’Opéra: sur quelques acquisitions récentes du département de la Musique", in L’Antiquité à la BnF, 20/12/2017.
