= Katalin Farkas (soprano) =

Hungarian soprano opera singer

Katalin Farkas (born January 5, 1954, Budapest) is a Hungarian opera singer, soprano. Since 1982 she is with the Budapest National Opera.

She studied at the Franz Liszt Academy of Music, opera department, graduated in 1982. Before that she learned to play piano and flute.

She made guest performances in Italy, Germany, Switzerland, Luxembourg and Spain.

== Recordings ==
Her recordings are with Hungaroton.

- 1985: Atalanta (opera)
- 1985:La serva padrona
- 1986: Don Sanche
- 1987: Der geduldige Sokrates
- 1988: Il pastor fido (Handel)
- 1990: Floridante
- 1990: Brockes Passion (Handel)
- 1993: Terpsicore
