= Maria Riccarda Wesseling =

Swiss-Dutch operatic mezzo-soprano

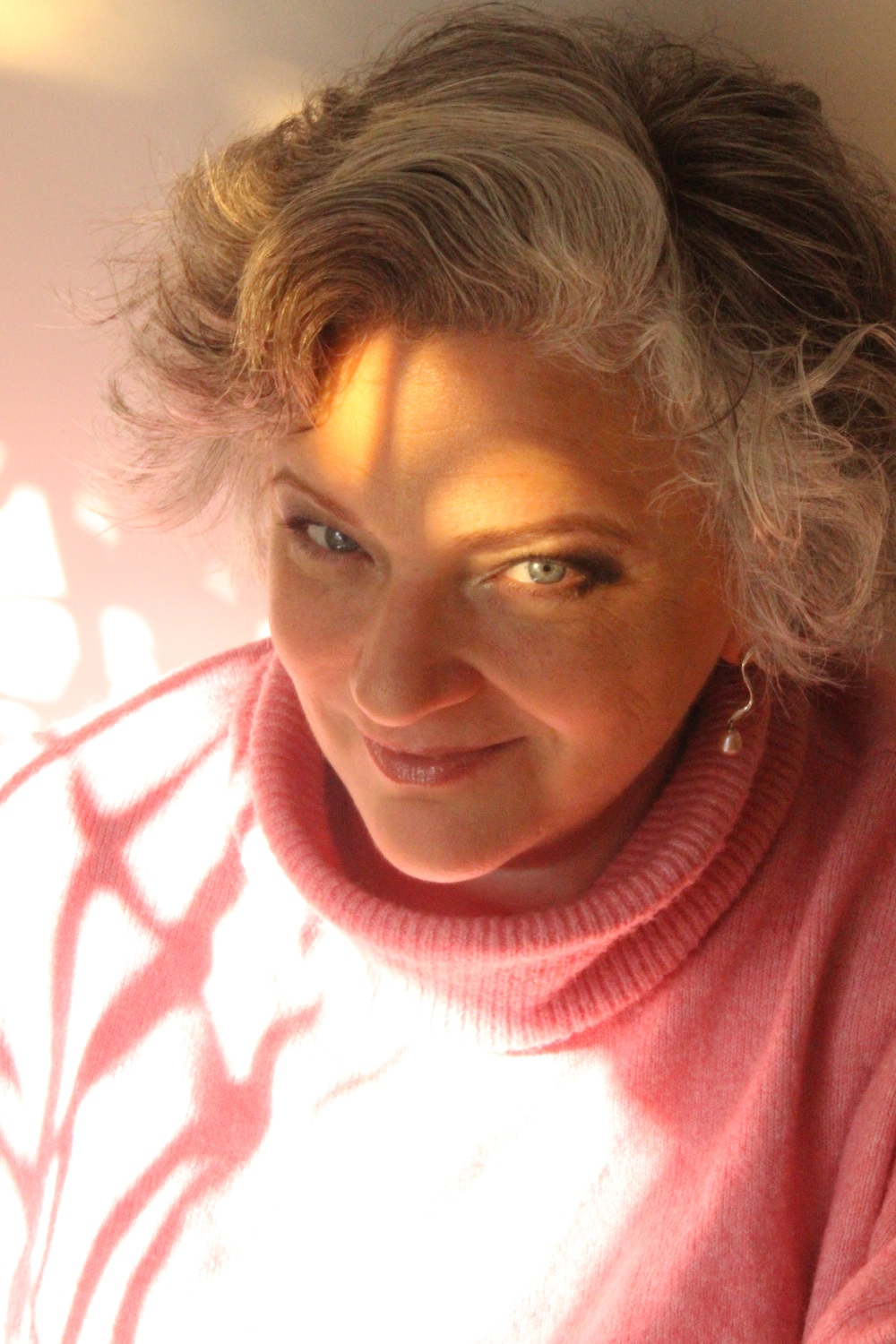
- Born: Maria Riccarda Schmid; Wattwil, Switzerland
- Education: Musikhochschule Bern; Sweelinck Conservatory
- Occupations: Classical operatic mezzo-soprano; Stage director
- Awards: Robert Schumann Competition; Prix Eliette von Karajan
- Website: www.mariariccardawesseling.com

Maria Riccarda Wesseling is a Swiss-Dutch operatic mezzo-soprano who has appeared in lead roles at international opera houses and festivals. She created the title role in Henze's last opera, Phaedra, at the Staatsoper Berlin, repeated at La Monnaie in Brussels and in the Barbican Centre.

== Career ==
Born Maria Riccarda Schmid in Wattwil, she studied with Hedwig Vonlanthen in Solothurn, with Elisabeth Glauser at the Musikhochschule Bern, and with Margreet Honig at the Sweelinck Conservatory in Amsterdam. She appeared as Rossinis La Cenerentola on a tour with the Orchestre National de Lille. She was a regular guest at the Stadttheater Bern, where she performed roles such as Kassandra in Aribert Reimann's Troades, Fenena in Verdi's Nabucco, Enrichetta in Bellini's I puritani, Olga in Tri Sestri by Péter Eötvös, Idamante in Mozart's Idomeneo, Cesare in Handel's Giulio Cesare, and the title role in Bizet's Carmen. She sang leading roles by Handel also at festivals, the title role of Rinaldo at the Lucerne Festival, the title role of Amadigi di Gaula at the Handel Festival Halle and the Festival de Radio France et Montpellier, Sesto in Giulio Cesare at the Festival de Beaune, Medea in Teseo in Halle, and Dejanira in Hercules in Potsdam. Several of these performances were recorded. Wesseling received international attention in 2006, when she stepped in at the Paris Opera for the title role of Gluck's Iphigénie en Tauride, staged by Krzysztof Warlikowski and conducted by Marc Minkowski. She was Iphigénie again in 2011 also at the Teatro Real in Madrid, now conducted by Thomas Hengelbrock. She appeared as Orpheus in Orfeo ed Euridice, staged by Pina Bausch and conducted by Hengelbrock, which was broadcast live by arte and recorded for DVD, and presented not only in Paris but also the Greek theatre in Epidauros, Lincoln Center in New York, and the Teatro Real. Wesseling appeared in Madrid also as Ottavia in Monteverdi's L’incoronazione di Poppea, conducted by Sylvain Cambreling. At the Ruhrtriennale 2015, she was Fricka in Das Rheingold under the batton of Teodor Currentzis. Since she created the title role in the world premiere of the opera "Annas Maske" by David Philip Hefti, sang Herodias in the Serebrennikow production of "Salome" at Staatsoper Stuttgart, debuted as Amneris in Aida and Klytämnestra in "Elektra".

In contemporary opera, she performed the title role in the premiere of Henze's Phaedra at the Staatsoper Berlin, repeated at La Monnaie in Brussels and in the Barbican Centre, also Pélérin in Kaija Saariaho's L'Amour de loin at the Finnish National Opera, Irma in Le Balcon by Péter Eötvös in Bordeaux, and Malaspina in Salvatore Sciarrino's Luci mie traditrici in Lyon. She appeared in Claude Vivier's Wo bist Du, Licht at the Ruhrtriennale, and as the Queen in Heinz Holliger's Schneewittchen, staged by Achim Freyer at Theater Basel.

In January 2018, Maria Riccarda Wesseling has presented her first production as stage director with a very successful staging of "The rape of Lucretia" at the Dutch National Opera Academy. In 2020 she staged "The merry widow" at Theater Nordhausen.

== Discography ==
- Paul Juon (1872–1940): Lieder (coviello classics Juli 2016)
- Wien 1900. Orchesterlieder by Arnold Schönberg, Alban Berg and Gustav Mahler (claves records)
- Handel: Heroines arias (claves records)
- Sous l’eau du songe. Lieder by Clara Schumann, Lili Boulanger and Alma Mahler (claves records)
- Richard Wagner: Werke für Kammerorchester (Original und Adaptationen), with Kammerphilharmonie Graubünden conducted by Marcus Bosch (coviello)
- Charles-Simon Catel: Sémiramis, title role (glossa)
- André-Ernest-Modeste Grétry: Andromaque, Hermione (glossa)
- George Frideric Handel: Rodrigo, title role (ambroisie)
- Handel: Amadigi, title role (ambroisie)
- Handel: Der Messias, alto part (Harmonia Mundi)
- Christoph Willibald Gluck: Orpheus und Eurydike, Orpheus (DVD bei BelAir)
- Jacques Offenbach: Les contes d’Hoffmann, Giulietta (DVD, BelAir)
- Offenbach: La Vie parisienne, Métella (DVD, Virgin Classics)
- Handel: Teseo, Medea (DVD, Arthaus)

== Awards ==
- Silver medal (2nd prize) Robert Schumann International Competition for Pianists and Singers 1996 Zwickau
- Prix Eliette von Karajan 2002
