= Marie Sallé =

French ballet dancer (1707–1756)

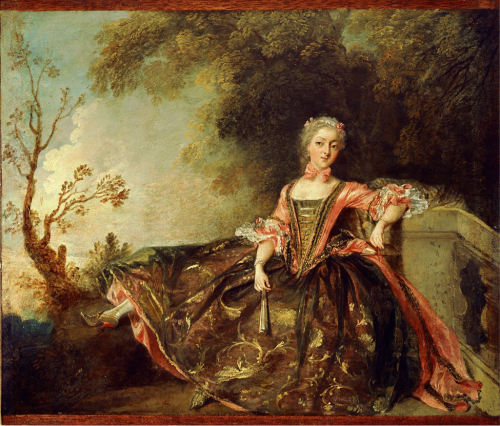
Marie Sallé by Nicolas Lancret

Marie Sallé (1707–1756) was a French dancer and choreographer in the 18th century known for her expressive, dramatic performances rather than a series of "leaps and frolics" typical of ballet of her time.

== Biography ==
Marie Sallé was a prominent dancer and choreographer in early 18th-century dance. She helped to create ballet d'action (a form continued by her student, Jean-Georges Noverre); she reformed traditional "feminine" costumes. Born to fairground performers and tumblers in 1707, Marie grew up performing around France with her family.

She made her first public performance with her brother, Francis, at London's Lincoln's Inn Fields Theatre in 1716. They made their Paris debut at the Saint Laurent fair in 1718 performing La Princesse Charisme, created by Véronique Lesage. In 1725, their family returned to England, but they stayed. The pair is said to have studied with Claude Balon, star of the Paris Opéra, as well as his partner, Françoise Prévost, and fellow dancer at Paris Opera, Michel Blondy. They spent two more seasons at Lincoln's Field Inn, performing dances from George Frideric Handel's opera Rinaldo as well as pantomimes.

Sallé went solo and started performing with the Paris Opera in late 1727. In her premiere, she performed in Jean-Joseph Mouret's Les Amours des Dieux. She danced alongside Marie Camargo, also a student of Prévost; however, they each formed different approaches to their dancing – Camargo as the technician and Sallé as the actress. Her legacy never quite separated from Camargo despite their differing styles. Sallé never settled in at the Paris Opera as she left three times after conflicts with the administration. Nevertheless, she left her mark there, especially during her collaboration with Jean-Philippe Rameau. She continued to London in 1734 for her fourth season. She was engaged by John Rich to perform at the Royal Opera House, Covent Garden. She danced in Terpsicore, a prologue to a revision of Handel's Il pastor fido and in the premieres of the same composer's Alcina and Ariodante.

Also In 1734 she presented her first original, and almost famous work in 1734, Pygmalion, a mythological tale of a statue that comes to life and the sculptor who creates it. This piece made her the first woman to choreograph a ballet in which she also danced. In Pygmalion, Sallé chose to dress in Greek robes, wear her hair down and dance in sandals while playing the role of the statue in an attempt to make it a more realistic characterization. According to Susan Au, her choreography "gave the impression of a danced conversation". During this season, Covent Garden also saw her pantomime Bacchus and Ariadne and her collaboration with Handel.

She returned to Paris in 1735 and choreographed and danced in scenes for Jean-Phillipe Rameau's opéra-ballets. She retired from the public stage in 1741. However, she continued to dance at court (i.e. to the request of royalty for them and the nobility at court). She taught at the Opéra-Comique in 1743 and, according to her student Jean-Georges Noverre, she practised daily. Sallé came out of retirement for a few performances at Versailles between 1745 and 1747. She died on 27 June 1756.

== Private life and public image ==
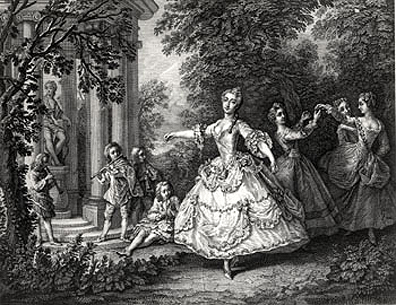
Sallé, c. 1730, after Nicolas Lancret

The theatrical scene in 18th-century London and Paris was generally a male preserve and unreceptive to change. It was mostly men who held influential positions in theaters, who were the artists, while women were mostly seen as merely able to interpret what men had created. Marie Sallé, not only an expressive dancer but also a noteworthy choreographer, expanded the boundaries assigned to women. However, despite being one of the first women to stage and dance in her own original productions in London and Paris opera houses, her achievements received negative feedback compared with her male counterparts. Sallé's accomplishments in her early years were interpreted by the public and the theater world in terms of virtuosity and the proper role of femininity. She was often described as "virginal" earning her the nickname of "La Vestale," in a reference to the vestal virgins of Rome who were the only women excused from having male guardianship. In fact, Nicholas Lancret, in 1732, painted a portrait of Sallé as the virgin goddess, Diana, further cementing Sallé's public virtuous image in her early years. Images of the rose also followed her after her role in Rameau's Les Indes galantes in 1735.

In contrast, Sallé also gained a reputation for being sensual and mysterious as regarded her private life. In dancing, she was described as the goddess of Grace and Voluptuousness, but this alternate image clashed with the one centering on virginity and virtuosity, creating a tension that critics and public spectators struggled to reconcile. As a result, Sallé's public image of purity began to deteriorate and be replaced by one of sexual predilection and scandal. After Sallé's return to Paris in 1735, rumors began to spread of an affair between her and Manon (Marie) Grognet, a dancer and colleague Sallé had met in London. At this time, Sallé was in her mid-thirties and had no heterosexual attachment, thus, the public speculated that colleagues of hers may have used her abstinence as a cover for her affairs. However, all rumors and publications on Sallé's sexual or romantic activity were not based on any tangible evidence.

Sallé retired at the age of thirty-three. Interestingly, once removed from the public gaze, she disappeared from the writings of her contemporaries as well. What written documentation remained after her retirement alluded once again to the virginal image of her early years. In her later life, Sallé lived in "domestic contentment" with an Englishwoman, Rebecca Wick, whom she named as her "amiable amie" five years prior to her death, when bequeathing her estate to Wick as her sole heir.

== Costume reform ==
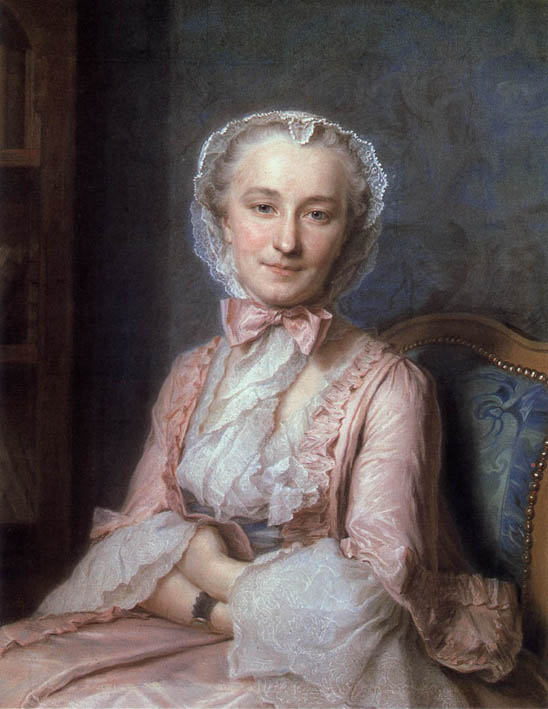
Marie Sallé, by Maurice Quentin de La Tour

Although mainly a choreographer and performer, Sallé also laid the foundation for an influential new wave of costume reform in dance history spearheaded by her pupil, Jean-Georges Noverre, in the late 18th century. Sallé introduced audiences to the idea of the rejection of masked dancers and vouched for the importance of dance and performance to mimic real life, including the costumes. She argued that costumes should reflect and represent the character, a novel idea at the time. This engendered a sense of "realism" that had been largely ignored up to this point in the evolution of ballet and also allowed for greater physical freedom among the female dancers, unburdening them of the restrictions of unwieldy and elaborate clothing on stage. This ideology of rejecting masks and realism mimicry was quickly picked up by Noverre and emphasized in his later works such as Letters.

Sallé's costume innovations were seen as overly radical and were rejected by French critics of her time. The culture and bureaucracies of dance in France in the eighteenth century were restrictive, thus it was common for dancers to turn to courts elsewhere for freedom to develop personal expressions of art. London in particular attracted many budding dancers as their lack of state patronage directly contrasted with France's strict bureaucracies regulating dance practices, and Sallé was one of these dancers. London audiences proved to be more accepting of innovation in dance, and Sallé's pantomime acting abilities fit well within the liberal climate of London audiences. There, she was able to choreograph and perform in arguably her most famous production, Pygmalion. Sallé's appearance on stage in her production without a pannier, or a skirt that was the typical expectation of women's costumes in her time, roused shock from French contemporaries and critics, who were appalled that she dared appear on stage without a skirt, headdress, or even a corset. Despite this negative feedback, Sallé continued to push her desires for realism in costuming, presenting what Sarah McCleave describes as one of Sallé's boldest costuming reform attempts in Handel's Alcina. There, she performed in what the Abbé Prévost later labeled as "male attire" that went against the feminine image typical of dancers in the eighteenth century. Sallé changed the traditional costuming from heavy long dresses to muslin-flowing material which caused shock and delight. She often performed without a skirt or bodice (sans-paniers), rebelling against the traditional costume and accepted gender norms of a very regimented era.

Critiques of Sallé's costume reforms ultimately returned to the strong patriarchal authority in the theatre sphere, where the dominant male voice imposed expectations of female grace and docility and criticized the female creators that strayed from this definition of femininity. Yet, Sallé was able to slowly gain respect for herself and her work despite the strong criticism by collaborating with influential composers such as George Frideric Handel and Christoph von Gluck, commissioning compositions from them for her choreography.

== See also ==
- Women in dance
