= Marie-Anne de Cupis de Camargo =

French dancer (1710–1770)

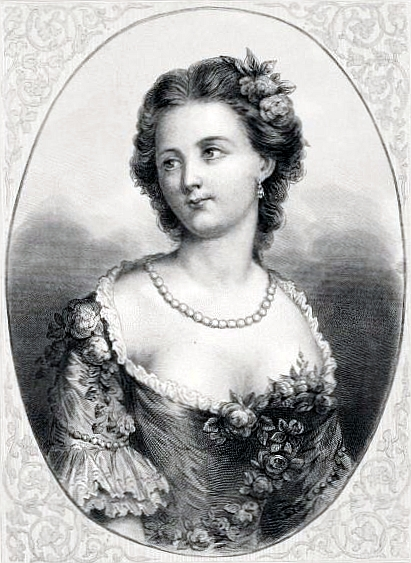
1880 image of de Camargo

Marie Anne de Cupis de Camargo (15 April 1710 – 28 April 1770), sometimes known simply as La Camargo, was a French dancer. The first woman to execute the entrechat quatre, Camargo was also allegedly responsible for two innovations in ballet as she was one of the first dancers to wear slippers instead of heeled shoes, and, while there is no evidence that she was the first woman to wear the short calf-length ballet skirt, the now standardized ballet tights, she did help to popularize these. She is said to have been as strong as the male dancers.

== Early life ==
Camargo was born in Brussels, and baptised the same day. She was the daughter of Ferdinand Joseph de Cupis and Marie-Anne de Smet, and had two younger brothers, Jean-Baptiste (1711–1788) who later became a composer and violinist, François Cupis de Renoussard (1719–1764), a composer and cellist, and a sister, Madeleine.

Her father, who was of Spanish ancestry, earned a meagre living as violinist and dancing-master, and from childhood she was trained for the stage. At ten years of age, she was given lessons by Françoise Prévost (1680–1741), then the first dancer at the Paris Opéra, and at once obtained an engagement as premiere danseuse, first at Brussels and then at Rouen.

== Career ==
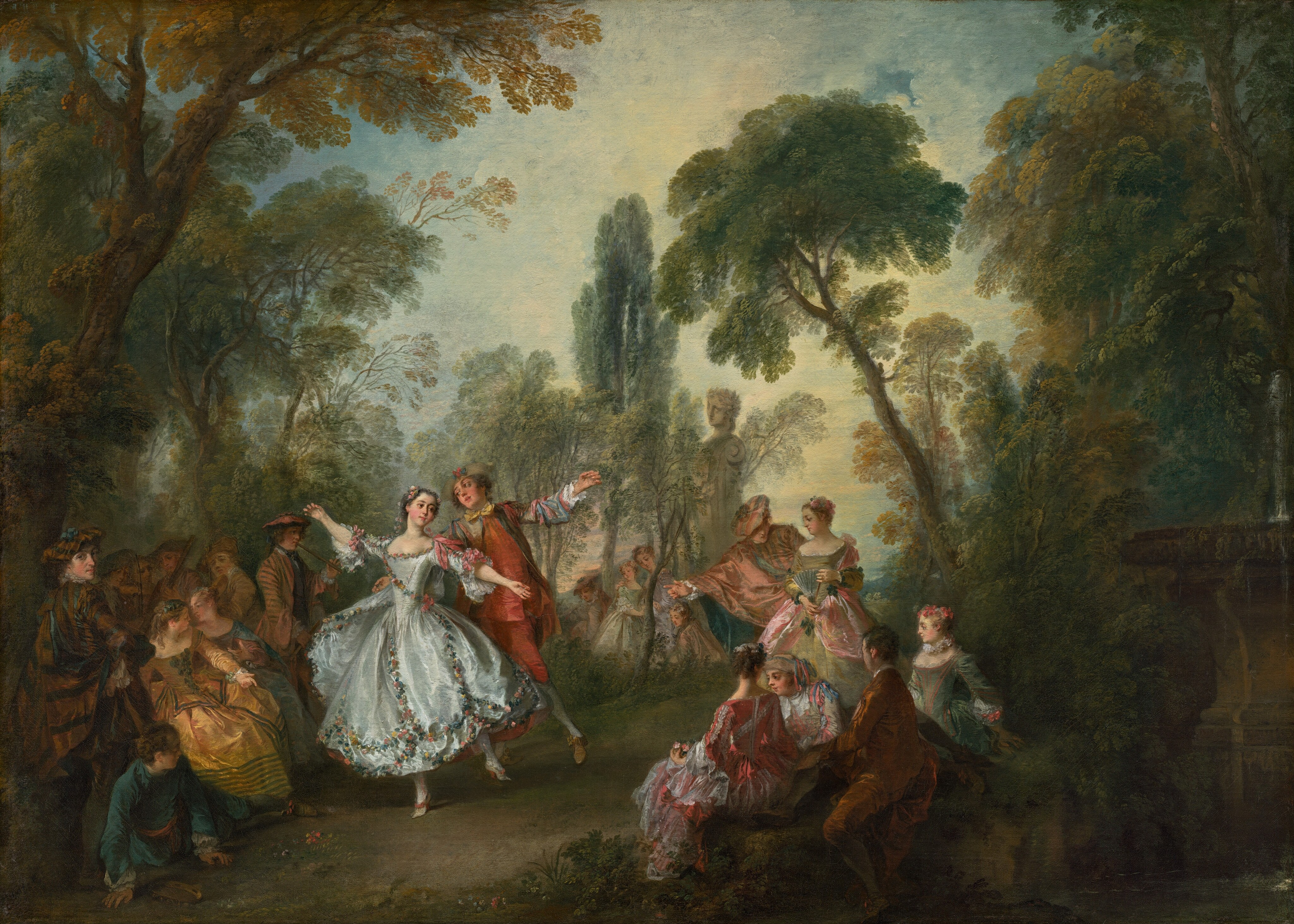
Painting of La Camargo dancing in a pastoral setting by Nicolas Lancret.

She made her Paris debut on 5 May 1726 at the Paris Opera Ballet in Les Caractères de la Danse. The piece was choreographed by her teacher Françoise Prévost to music by Jean Ferry Rebel. Prévost herself originated the role, and subsequently taught her popular solo to both Camargo and her other student, Marie Sallé. Camargo dazzled audiences with her stunning technique and sprightly energy, performing entrechats and cabrioles with brilliant execution. She became the first woman to execute the entrechat quatre, and she at once became the rage. She popularized two innovations to ballet, changing from heeled shoes to slippers, and she was one of the first ballet-dancers to shorten the skirt to what afterwards became the regulation length. Every new fashion bore her name; her manner of doing her hair was copied by all at court; her shoemaker — she had a tiny foot — made his fortune.

Her increasing popularity at the Paris Opera inspired jealousy in Prévost, who demoted her to the corps de ballet. However, a later incident involving a missing male dancer saw Camargo unexpectedly step into his place and improvise a brilliant solo. This feat secured her status as a principal ballerina.

She had many titled admirers whom she nearly ruined by her extravagances, among others Louis de Bourbon, Count of Clermont. At his wish she retired from the stage from 1736 to 1741, resuming her dancing career from 1741 to 1751. After finally retiring, she received a government pension.

In her time she appeared in 78 ballets or operas, always to the delight of the public. Nicolas Lancret painted a famous portrait of her that exists in several versions including works now held at the Wallace Collection, London, and at the National Gallery of Art, Washington, DC (shown right). In them she wears heeled shoes and is poised à demi point.

A ballet, Camargo, based on the incident when she and her sister Madeleine were abducted by the Comte de Melun in May 1728 was created by Marius Petipa and the composer Léon Minkus for the Russian Imperial Ballet, premiering December 19, 1872 with the famous ballerina, Adèle Grantzow, as Marie Anne Camargo. The work was later revived in 1901 for the Russian Imperial Ballet by Lev Ivanov for Pierina Legnani. After the Russian Revolution of 1917, however, the ballet was never performed again.

== Death ==
She died on 28 April 1770, thirteen days after her 60th birthday, in Paris.

== See also ==
- Camargo Society - A London ballet company (1930–1933) named after La Camargo
- Women in dance
- Troupe of the Comédie-Française in 1755
