= Terpsicore =

1734 opera by Handel

George Frideric Handel

Terpsicore (HWV)(8b) is a prologue in the form of an opéra-ballet by George Frideric Handel. Handel composed it in 1734 for a revision of his opera Il pastor fido which had first been presented in 1712. The revision of Il pastor fido with Terpsicore as the prologue was first performed on 9 November 1734 at Covent Garden theatre in London, opening Handel's first season in that newly built theatre. Terpsicore mixes dance along with solo and choral singing and was patterned after models in French operas, a particular source being Les festes grecques et romaines by Louis Fuzelier and Colin de Blamont, first presented in Paris in 1723. The work featured the celebrated French dancer Marie Sallé as well as stars of Handel's Italian operas and was a success with audiences of the day.

== Performance history ==
Il pastor fido, a pastoral opera first performed in 1712, had not been a success with audiences. This was probably due to the fact that it was lacking in the sort of spectacular scenic effects and larger than life emotions of Handel's then sensational previous opera Rinaldo . As a result, in 1734, Handel radically revised Il Pastor Fido and presented the new version with a star role for celebrated castrato Carestini. This production ended Handel's 1733-34 season at the King's Theatre in the Haymarket. It eventually became so successful that Handel chose the piece a few months later to open his first season at his new artistic home, Covent Garden Theatre. A new prologue, Terpsichore, was added to showcase the talents of internationally famous dancer, Marie Sallé. She later also appeared as a dancer in Handel's operas Alcina and Ariodante.

As with all Baroque opera seria, Il Pastor Fido and its prologue Terpsicore went unperformed for many years, but that changed with the revival of interest in Baroque music and historically informed musical performance from the 1960s. Today, Terpsicore receives performances at festivals and opera houses, whether as prologue to Il Pastor Fido or as an independent piece. Among other performances, Terpsicore was seen in a choreographed staging at the Manoel Theatre, Malta, and the Château de Versailles Spectacles, France, in 2013.

== Roles ==
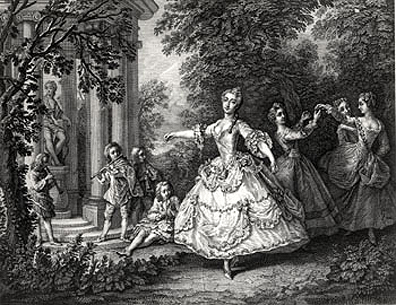
Marie Sallé

Role	Voice type	Premiere Cast, 9 November 1734
Apollo	mezzo-soprano castrato	Giovanni Carestini
Erato, muse of lyric poetry	soprano	Anna Maria Strada
Terpsichore, muse of dancing	dancer	Marie Sallé

== Synopsis ==
Erato, muse of lyric poetry, and her followers, call on Apollo, who descends from heaven with some of the Muses. They summon Terpsicore, who gives a demonstration of the power of dance, illustrating diverse emotions through use of movement. Solo singers and chorus join together to praise the virtuous deeds of wise men that are going to be celebrated in the ensuing opera.

== Context and analysis ==
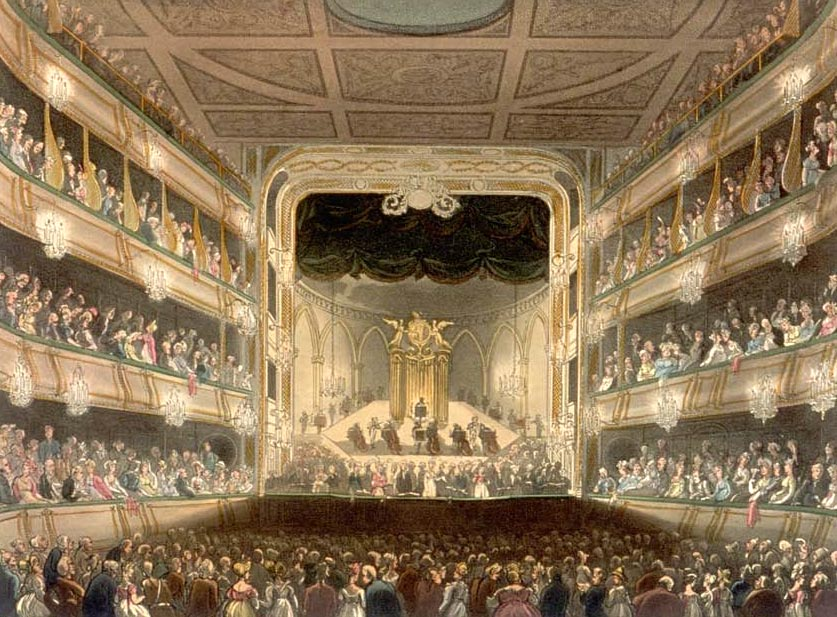
A picture of the theatre at Covent Garden where Terpsicore was first performed

The German-born Handel, after spending some of his early career composing operas and other pieces in Italy, settled in London, where in 1711 he had brought Italian opera for the first time with his opera Rinaldo. A tremendous success, Rinaldo created a craze in London for Italian opera seria, a form focused overwhelmingly on solo arias for the star virtuoso singers. Handel had composed numerous Italian operas for London, with varying degrees of success; some were enormously popular. At the end of the 1734 season, the lease Handel had on the King's Theatre in the Haymarket expired and he found another base for his operatic activity in the new theatre built by John Rich in Covent Garden. Il Pastor Fido, with the newly composed prologue Terpsichore, opened his new season there. It is the only example of a Handel opera with a prologue, and is patterned on the similar extended prologues in the works of Jean-Philippe Rameau, blending operatic arias, choruses, and dancing. The work opens with a chorus, followed by a bravura aria each for Apollo and Erato. Terpsicore demonstrates the power of dance in a series of contrasted dance movements, interspersed with duets and solos from the singers. The work concludes with vocal soloists, chorus and dancers joining in a praise of virtue and wisdom.

Terpsicore is scored for two recorders, two oboes, bassoon, two horns, strings, organ, theorbo and continuo (cello, theorbo, harpsichord).

== Recording ==
Katalin Farkas, soprano, Derek Lee Ragin, counter-tenor, Capella Savaria, conductor Nicholas McGegan. Recorded 1993.CD:Hungaroton Cat:31193
