= Phaedra (opera) =

Opera by Hans Werner Henze

- Concert opera by Hans Werner Henze
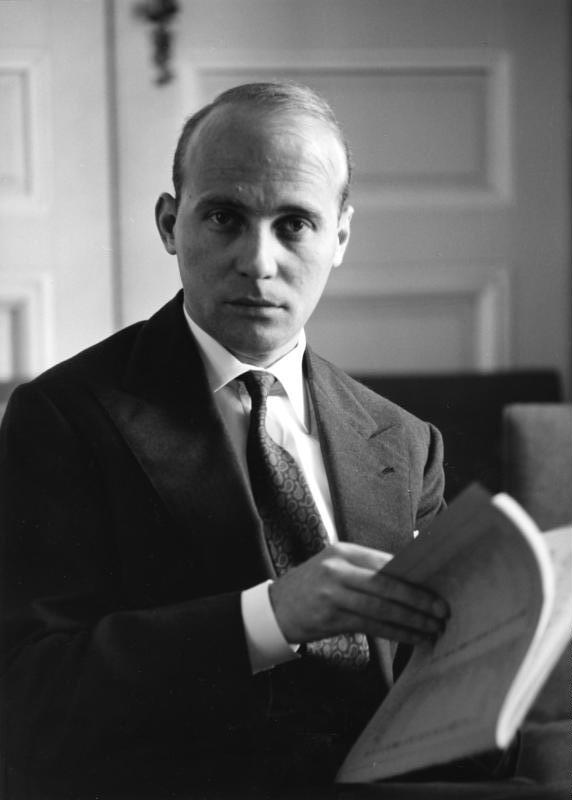
- The composer in 1960
- Librettist: Christian Lehnert
- Language: German
- Based on: Phaedra, by several authors
- Premiere: 6 September 2007; Berlin State Opera

Phaedra is a 'concert opera' in two acts by Hans Werner Henze. Its first performance was given at the Berlin State Opera on 6 September 2007. The work is a co-commission and co-production with the Berliner Festspiele, Théâtre de la Monnaie, Brussels, Alte Oper Frankfurt and the Vienna Festival.

Although Henze announced in 2003 that L'Upupa und der Triumph der Sohnesliebe would be his last opera, it became known during 2006 that in spite of serious illness, he was preparing a new opera based on the classical myth of Phaedra.

== Preparation of the libretto ==
The libretto is by Christian Lehnert and deals in an innovative way with the story of Phaedra, whose love for her stepson Hippolytus triggers catastrophe. The first part of the opera tells this legend much as previously retold by Euripides, Racine and Sarah Kane. The second part, however, follows a mythological tradition alluded to by Ovid. Hippolytus, fatally wounded, is brought back to life by the goddess Artemis, and is given a new life under the name of Virbius. In this new existence, however, he is only able to experience his own consciousness in a fragmentary, kaleidoscopic way.

The first act is rooted in Greece, and Greek myth. The second, composed after Henze's collapse and two-month coma, is set in Nemi, near Henze's home in Italy, and the location of the ancient cult and priesthood of Virbius (which inspired Sir James Frazer to write The Golden Bough). As the struggles of the goddesses and the identity of Hippolyt become gradually more and more abstract and remote, the wholeness of nature reasserts itself, and the Minotaur, in Henze's words, "proclaims a kind of freedom, the spring comes... into the world and the woods." In its latter stages, the opera seems to abstract itself even from the stage, treading "a metaphysical tightrope between this world and the next, effortlessly invoking a porous divide between the living and the dead. The opera's end is both transcendental and inconclusive: "We are all born naked. We press towards mortality and dance," sings the Minotaur in his final hymn."

== Performance history ==
The first production was designed by the Icelandic artist Olafur Eliasson and produced by Peter Mussbach. Costumes were designed by Bernd Skodzig. Michael Boder conducted the orchestra of Ensemble Modern. The role of Hippolytus was sung by John Mark Ainsley (tenor), that of Phaedra by Maria Riccarda Wesseling (mezzo-soprano) and that of Aphrodite by Marlis Petersen (soprano). The role of the goddess Artemis was sung by the countertenor Axel Köhler, an interesting example both of Henze's fondness for and stylistic affinity with Baroque conventions (in this case that of the travesti) and of his blissfully unconventional approach to gender and sexuality (as its name implies, the tradition of the breeches role is for a woman to play the part of a man).

The concept of a 'concert opera' inspired Eliasson (in his first work for the operatic stage), Mussbach and Skodzig to seek to develop 'a new kind of theatrical evening, reflecting and profoundly questioning the actualities of our way of looking at the world'.

== Roles ==
- Phaedra (mezzo-soprano)
- Aphrodite (soprano)
- Hippolyt (tenor)
- Artemis (countertenor travesti)
- Minotauros (bass-baritone)

== Synopsis ==
=== Act 1: Morning ===
I. The Labyrinth – Echoes resound in the ruins of the labyrinth, in the depths of which Theseus has vanquished the Minotaur. The echoes become the voices of a new story: Phaedra and Hippolyt.

II. Edge of the Forest – Hippolyt has gone hunting. Phaedra, his stepmother, wanders through the dawn. In love with her stepson, she is filled with desire and self-loathing. She seeks death. Aphrodite prevents her suicide. Hippolyt's devotion to Artemis fills Aphrodite with jealousy.

III. Thicket – Phaedra finds Hippolyt asleep in a thicket and sings of her love. Hippolyt awakes: Phaedra confesses her feelings. Artemis warns Hippolyt, who pushes Phaedra away. Phaedra's love turns in an instant to hate. Phaedra and Aphrodite find common cause and swear vengeance.

IV. The Snare – Phaedra writes to Theseus, falsely accusing Hippolyt of raping her.

V. Death of Hippolyt – Artemis reports: Theseus believed Phaedra's letter, and asked Poseidon to help bring about his death. The sea-god made the revived Minotaur rise from the sea and frighten the horses pulling Hippolyt's chariot. The horses shied and threw him to his death. As Artemis sings, a mortally wounded Hippolyt comes to her and collapses. A trapdoor slams. Phaedra has hanged herself. The Minotaur dances.

=== Act 2: Evening ===
I. Do you remember who you were? – Artemis has brought Hippolyt's body to Nemi in Italy. She brings him back to life and locks him in a cage, giving him a new name: Virbius (Man-Twice). Phaedra, as a bird of the underworld, flutters around the cage, mocking Hippolyt.

II. When will the dead come to you, Hippolyt? – A storm breaks over Nemi. Aphrodite claims Hippolyt for the Underworld. Phaedra and Aphrodite sing of the dead and lure Hippolyt like an animal. Artemis catches him in a net and throws him in a cave.

III. In the Mirror – Hippolyt crouches by a pool in the cave. He sees his reflected image. He does not know who he is. He dreams of a distant garden. Phaedra, as femme fatale, attempts to lure him into the Underworld. Hippolyt, frightened and confused, pushes Phaedra away and rushes from the cave. An earthquake strikes.

IV. King of the Woods – Hippolyt is resurrected as King of the Woods. He moves through the grove of Nemi. What was and what is becoming dissolves in dance.
