= Françoise Prévost (dancer) =

French ballet dancer

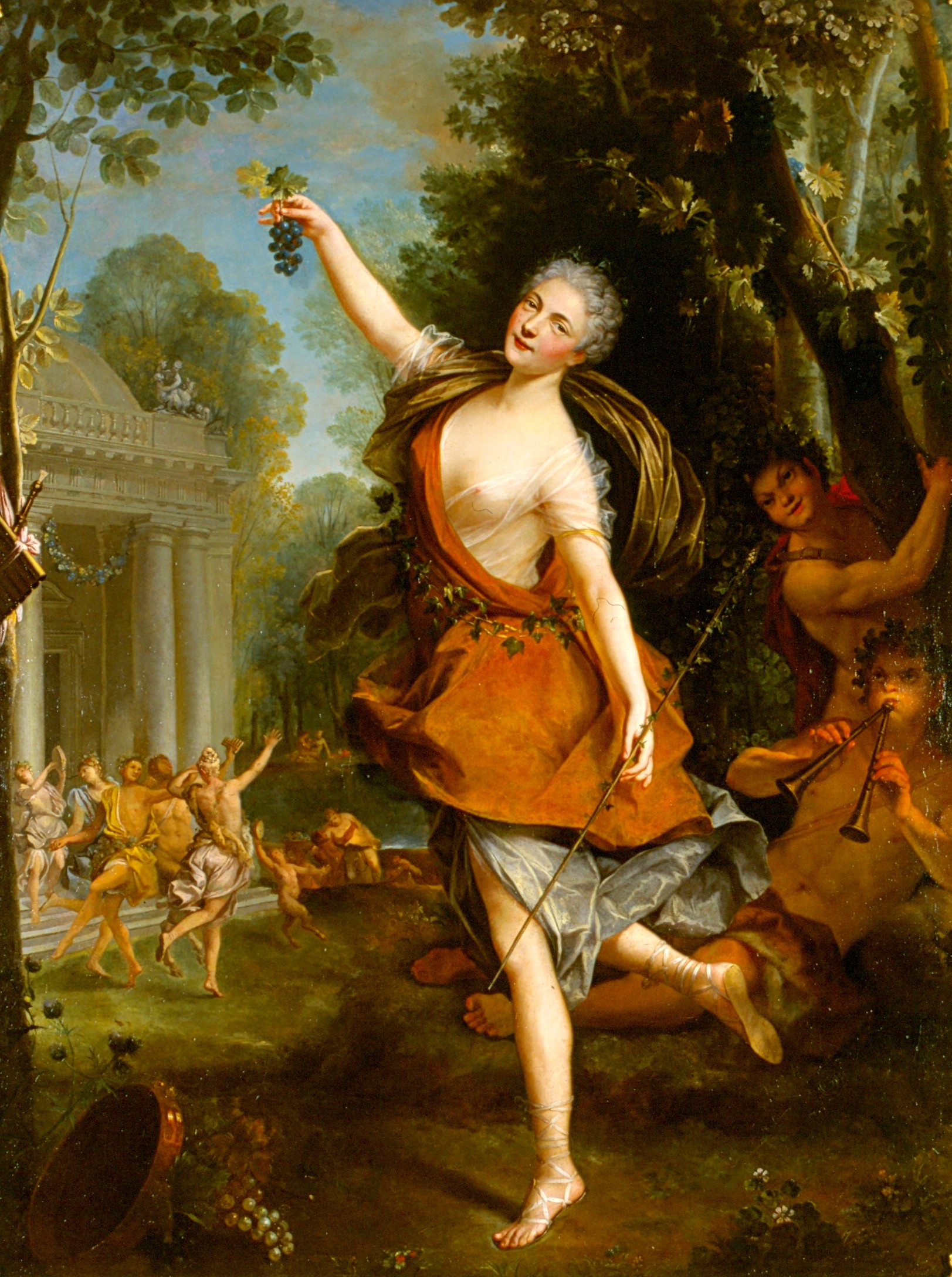
Mademoiselle Prévost as a Bacchante by Jean Raoux, c. 1723

Françoise Prévost (French: [fʁɑ̃swaz pʁevo]; c. 1680 in Paris – 1741 in Paris) was a French ballerina who helped establish dramatic dance in the early world of classical ballet. She was expressive, light and dramatic in style.

In 1699, Prevost debuted at the Académie d'Opera in the ballet, Atys, later replacing Marie-Thérèse de Subligny as the female lead. In 1708, she performed with Jean Balon in the final scene of Corneille's Les Horaces. The performance, though only of the final scene of the play and entirely in pantomime, is said to have caused the audience to weep. The "pantomime" came from the popular theaters of the time and freely used bold gestures and body language to communicate the narrative to the audience. The goal was to convey a story of meaning using purely movement, without spoken word. Maintaining her interest in the dramatic potential of dance, Prevost created a famous solo in 1714 called "Les Caracteres de la Danse." Choreographed to a suite of dances by composer Jean Ferry Rebel, the "characters" depicted a series of lovers of varying ages and sexes, and Prevost enacted each one to a different piece of music: the bourree, the menuet, the passepied.

She taught this solo to her two most accomplished female students: Marie Camargo and Marie Sallé. Camargo was the first to learn the solo for her debut at the Paris Opera. Her growing success incited jealousy in Prevost, and she relegated Camargo to the corps de ballet. One day however, Camargo made a spectacular impromptu improvisation solo for a missing male dancer. The arrival of Marie Salle, and her dramatic recreation of the famous solo into a pas de deux of rich emotional interaction, highlighted the different approaches to dance of the period: technical flash verses dramatic depth.

Prevost retired as première danseuse in 1730, being replaced by her students.

== See also ==
- Women in dance
