= Jane Barbier =

18th-century English opera singer

Jane Barbier (will proved 9 December 1757) was an English contralto of the 18th century, best known for her performances in the operas of George Frideric Handel. She first performed in 1711 in the revival of the opera Almahide. She created the roles of Dorinda and Arcano (Il pastor fido and Teseo, respectively), and also sang in Rinaldo. After leaving Italian opera she performed in the masques of Johann Pepusch, and worked for John Rich in various pantomimes and English-language operas. Thomas Arne's Rosamond (1733), where she took the role of King Henry, marked the end of her successful career, and after this she largely disappears from the historical record.
