= Valentino Urbani =

Italian opera singer

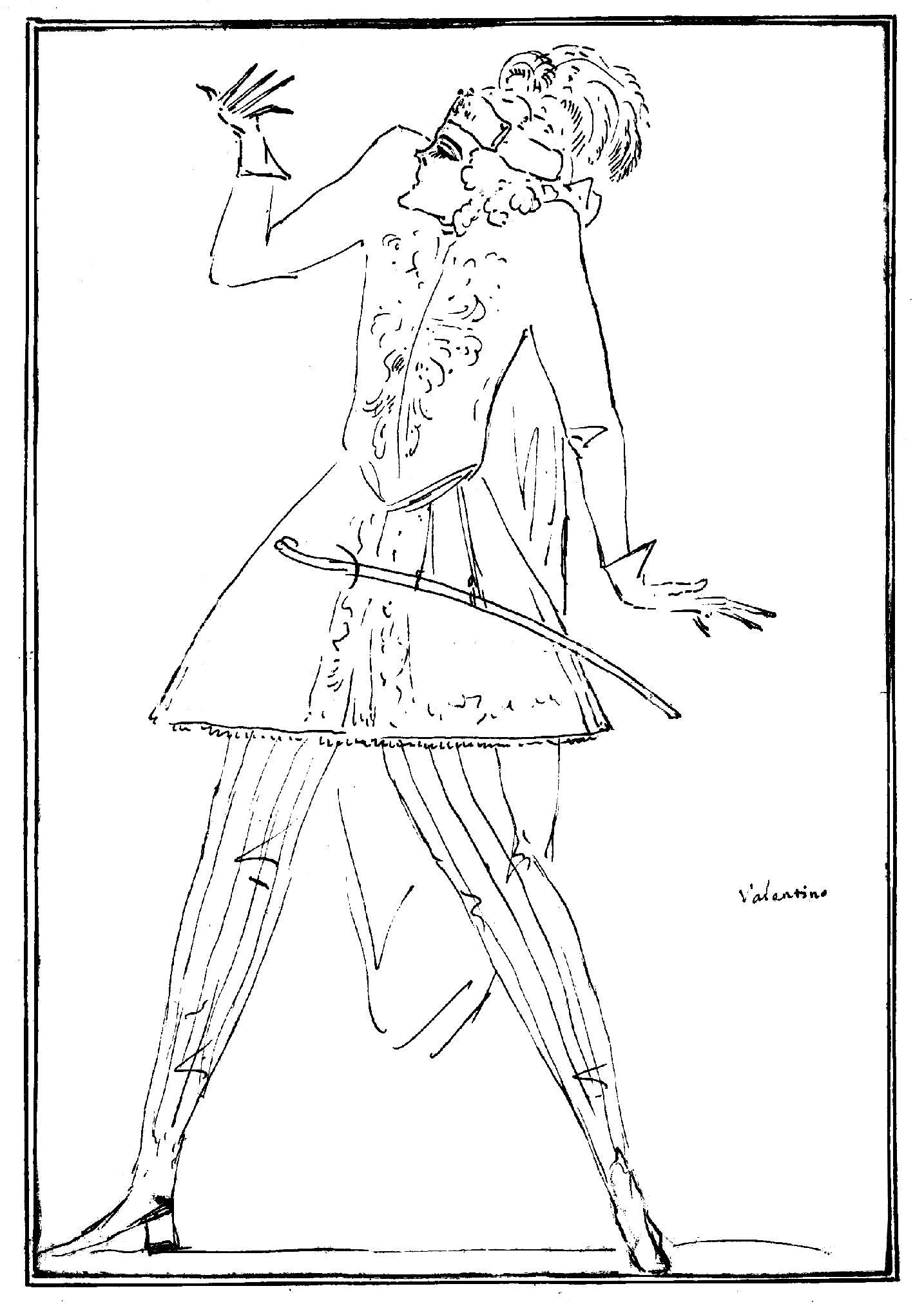
- An 18th-century caricature of Valentino Urbani made by Antonio Maria Zanetti

Background information
- Also known as: Valentini
- Born: Valentino Urbani; Udine
- Years active: c. 1707 – 1722

Valentino Urbani (born in Udine; fl. 1690–1722) was an Italian mezzo-soprano or alto castrato who sang for the composer George Frideric Handel in the 18th century. He was known by the stage name Valentini. He sang the role of Eustazio at the première of Handel's Rinaldo, the role of Silvio at the premiere of Il pastor fido, and the role of Egeo at the first performance of Teseo. His powers of singing seem to have been limited and by the time of his Handel roles his voice was declining but he is reputed to have been a fine actor.

Charles Burney noted that "his voice was feeble, and his execution moderate", but Cibber praises his acting enthusiastically: "his hearers bore with the absurdity of his singing the part of Turnus in Camilla, all in Italian, while every other character was sung and recited in English".

Urbani was the first castrato to sing regularly in London, where he created a sensation and made his début at Drury Lane in 1707. He sang in many different pasticcios and several bilingual operas – operas that were sung in both Italian and English – and had a benefit concert each year. His last known dramatic appearance was in Hamburg in 1722. He had earlier sung at Venice, Parma, Rome, Bologna, and Genoa.
