= Il pastor fido =

Play by Giovanni Battista Guarini

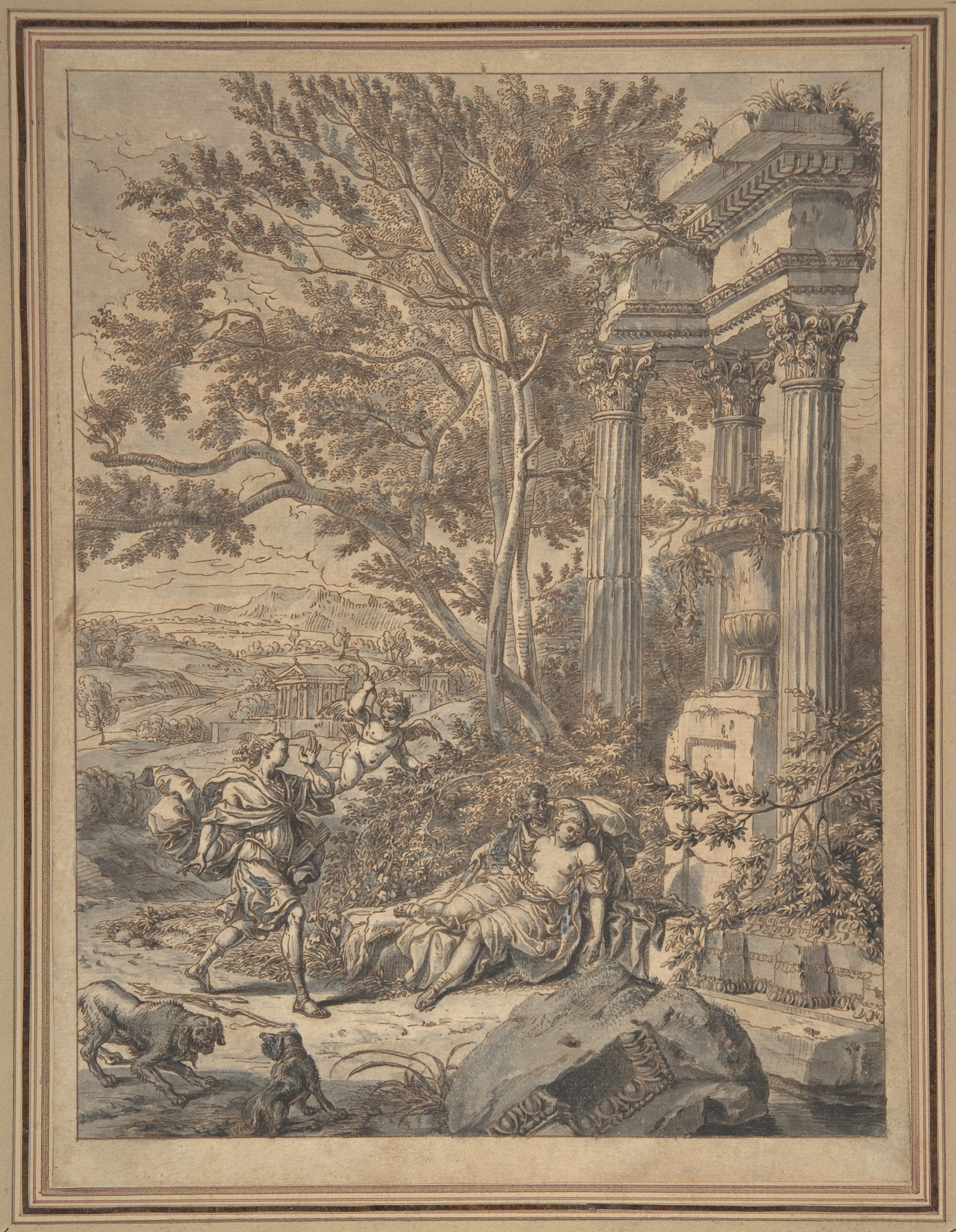
Silvio Approaches Dorinda, act IV, scene 8

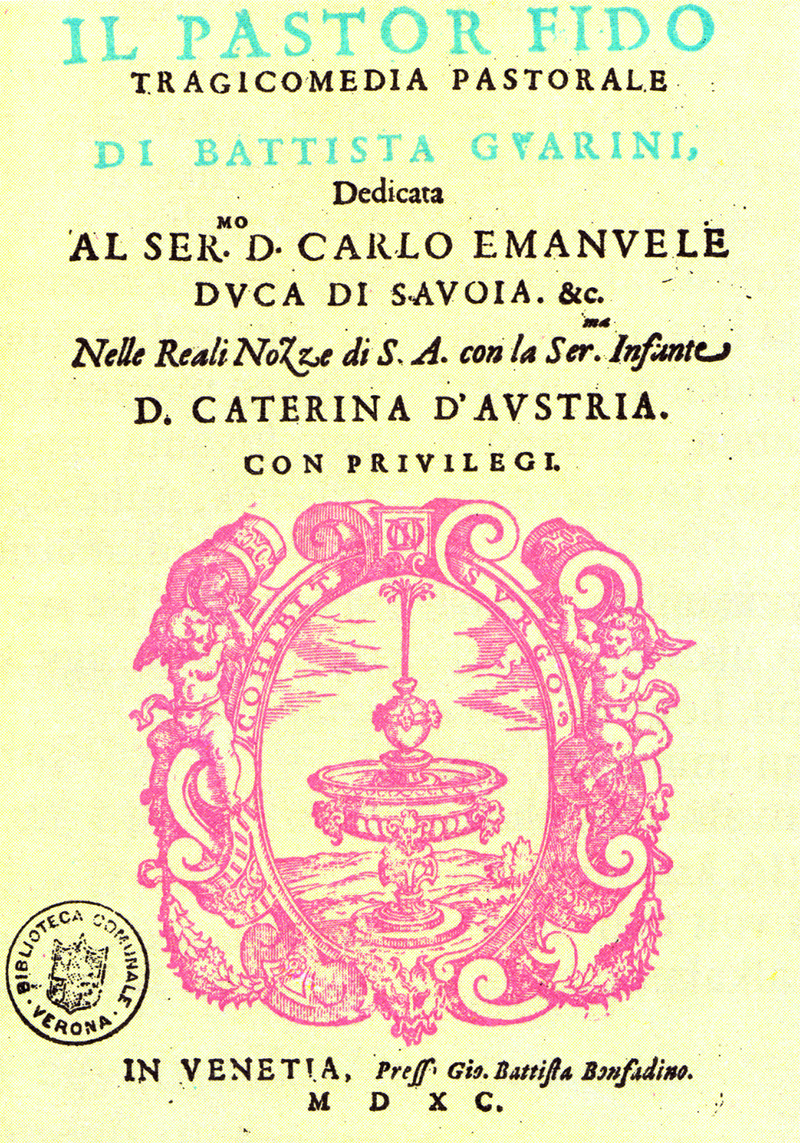
Guarinis's Il pastor fido cover page

Il pastor fido (The Faithfull Shepherd in Richard Fanshawe's 1647 English translation) is a pastoral tragicomedy set in Arcadia by Giovanni Battista Guarini, first published in 1590 in Venice.

== Plot summary ==
To redress an ancient wrong, the gods of Arcadia every year demand the sacrifice of a virgin. According to the oracle, this curse can only be lifted when a young man and a young woman, each of godly descent, are wed. In Arcadia there are now only two that can claim such lineage: the young Silvio (the son of the priest Montano, and a descendant of Hercules) and the nymph Amarilli (the daughter of Titiro, and a descendant of Pan). Thus the two have been promised to each other in marriage.

The play unfolds a double plot. One storyline follows Silvio, who cares only for the hunt and gives no thought to love or to his impending marriage. Silvio is pursued by a nymph named Dorinda. She tries to win his love in several ways, but he scorns her affections. One day Dorinda, seeking to watch Silvio as he hunts, disguises herself as a shepherd wearing wolfskin clothes. After the hunt, she departs and lies down to rest. From a distance, Silvio mistakes her for a wolf and shoots her with an arrow. Having wounded Dorinda, Silvio is at last awakened to pity, and to love.

In another storyline, Amarilli is loved by a foreign shepherd named Mirtillo. Amarilli loves Mirtillo in return, but keeps her feelings secret since she knows she must marry Silvio. Meanwhile, the faithless nymph Corisca is also in love with Mirtillo; Corisca is in turn loved by the shepherd Coridon, as well as a lustful satyr. Corisca plots to eliminate Amarilli. She sets up an elaborate ruse, hoping to trap Amarilli in a cave with Coridon. This will make it look as if Amarilli has broken her impending marriage vows to Silvio, for which the punishment is death. But the plan goes awry and it is Mirtillo who is trapped in the cave with Amarilli. The two are discovered by the priest Montano (Silvio's father), who condemns Amarilli to die as a sacrifice to the gods. Mirtillo (the faithful shepherd) demands that he be sacrificed instead, and so takes Amarilli's place. At the last minute, it is discovered that Mirtillo is really Montano's long-lost son, so that Amarilli and Mirtillo can be married and still fulfill the demands of the oracle. Corisca repents and is forgiven. Amarilli and Mirtillo are wed, as are Silvio and a healed Dorinda.

== Composition and publication ==
Most likely Guarini wrote the play between 1580 and 1585. Prior to publication he sought the advice of Florentine scholar Lionardo Salviati, who also circulated the manuscript among other members of the private Accademia degli Alterati of Florence. Salviati's criticisms were varied, including characterisation, plot, length, decorum, and overall unsuitability for the stage; however these criticisms did not stop Guarini from publishing it at Venice in 1590, after some revisions.

On 4 April 1584 Vincenzo I Gonzaga sent a letter to Guarini requesting the manuscript, intending to mount a production for his marriage to Leonora de' Medici at Mantua at the end of April. Guarini responded that he was yet to write the final act and all of the choruses, so a performance would be premature. There was a failed attempt later in 1584 to put on a performance, this time at Ferrara. The play had its first complete performance in Turin, in 1585, in honor of the nuptials of the Duke of Savoy and Catharine of Austria. In the next year a pamphlet war erupted between proponents and opponents of the play, which was to continue until 1593.

Guarini continued to revise the play after the first publication, the last revision being for the 20th edition of 1602 (Venice). It appeared in over a hundred editions following its first publication.

== Influence ==
The play's enduring fame inspired numerous madrigal composers of the 17th century, among them Giaches de Wert, Claudio Monteverdi, Sigismondo d'India, Alessandro Grandi, Tarquinio Merula, and Heinrich Schütz; Philippe de Monte named a volume after the play. The first operatic treatment was Handel's HWV 8 in 1712.

The Il pastor fido sonatas for Musette de cour or flute published as Vivaldi's opus 13 are in fact by Nicolas Chédeville.

In 1658 it was translated in Greek by the Zakynthian Michael Soumakis (Μιχαήλ Σουμάκης) and printed in Venice under the title "Ποιμήν Πιστός".
