= Pyrrhus and Demetrius =

1694 Opera

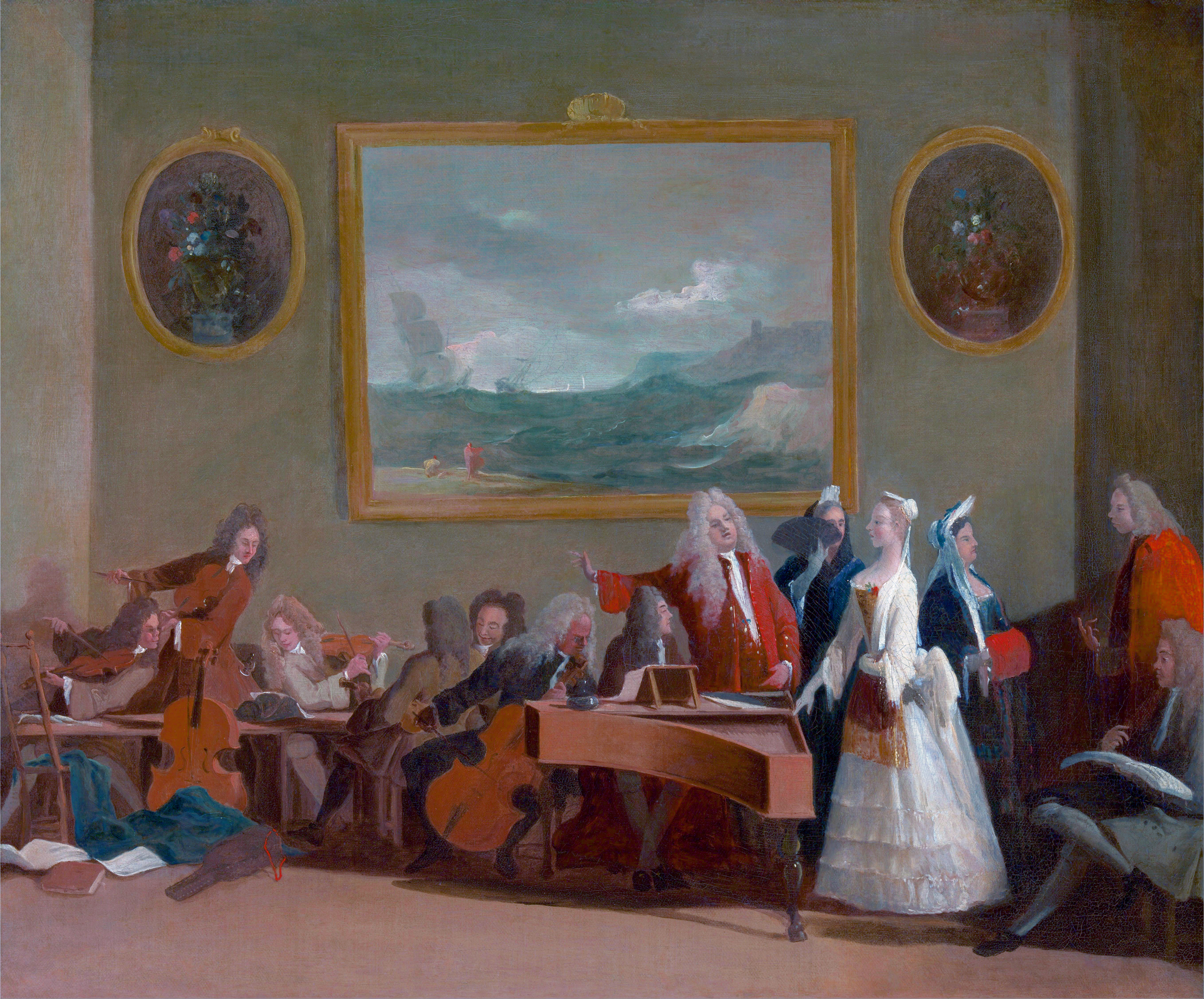
Rehearsal, said to be for Pyrrhus and Demetrius – Nicola Haym at the harpsichord, Nicolo Grimaldi (Nicolini) standing and singing, Dr. Pepusch entering the room on the right

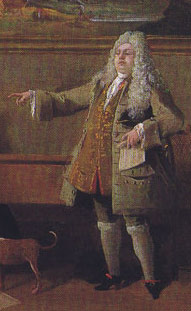
Nicolò Grimaldi (Nicolini)

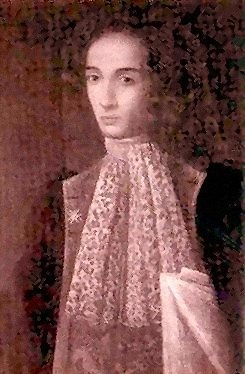
Alessandro Scarlatti

Pyrrhus and Demetrius was a 1708 adaptation for the London stage of the 1694 opera Il Pirro e Demetrio by Alessandro Scarlatti with a libretto by Adriano Morselli, first performed at the Teatro San Bartolomeo.

Pyrrhus and Demetrius was the second most successful opera in early 18th century London, after Camilla. It had 58 or 59 performances between 1708 and 1717. The opera marked the London debut of the castrato Nicolò Grimaldi (Nicolini).

== Score and libretto ==
The London version was prepared by Nicola Haym, who composed a new overture and 24 new arias, retaining only 14 of Scarlatti's original arias. Haym also inserted an aria by Handel from Agrippina: Ho un non so che nel cor. The English libretto was created by Owen Swiny.

In January 1709 Walsh, Randall, and Hare printed the overture and 54 arias in Songs in the Opera Call'd Pyrrhus and Demetrius. In May 1709 a different edition of The Songs in the Opera of Pyrrhus and Demetrius was published by John Cullen.

== Roles and action ==
The roles in the opera are:

Pyrrhus, king of Epirus; Demetrius king of Macedonia; Climene, daughter of King Lysimachus, enemy of Demetrius; Climene, sister of Pyrrhus; Clearte, lover of Deidamia; Arbante, a knight; Marius, son of Arbante; Breno, servant of Deidamia.

The action is set in ancient Macedonia. Demetrius has seized the throne after having murdered Alexander, himself the murderer of his mother Thessalonice. He then wants to invade Asia, but Ptolemy, Seleucus and Lysimachus join forces against him, joined by Pyrrhus, king of Epirus. Pyrrhus succeeds in driving out Demetrius and replacing him on the throne, before himself being driven away by Lysimachus.

== Performance history ==
The opera opened at the Queen's Theatre on December 14, 1708, with the castrato Nicolò Grimaldi (Nicolini) starring as Pyrrhus, who had sung in the original 1694 production in Naples; another castrato Valentino Urbani, (Valentini) in the role of Demetrius, Littleton Ramondon (Cleartes), Purbeck Turner (Arbantes), Margherita de L'Epine (Marius), Cook (Brennus), Catherine Tofts (Climene), Joanna Maria Lindelheim (Deidamia). The two castrati sang in Italian, the other singers in English. The sets for the first production were created by Marco Ricci and Giovanni Antonio Pellegrini.

The opera had a significant impact on the business of running an opera house in England. Nicolini brought with him a detailed account of the economics of Venetian opera houses, and the management of the Queen's Theatre adapted its business model accordingly. In accordance with Nicolini's advice a subscription of 1000 guineas was raised from Queen Anne and both subscriptions and ticket prices were increased.

== Critical reception ==
Richard Steele described the opera as 'a noble entertainment,' and praised Nicolini who, 'by the grace and propriety of his action and gesture, does honour to a human figure.' The author of A Critical Discourse stated that the opera was considered to be the best Scarlatti ever wrote, having achieved universal applause wherever it was performed. He also praised the judicious composition and addition of new material in the Lindon adaptation, which he contrasted with the incoherent efforts of earlier ventures such as Arsinoe, Queen of Cyprus.
