= Thomyris, Queen of Scythia =

Pasticcio opera

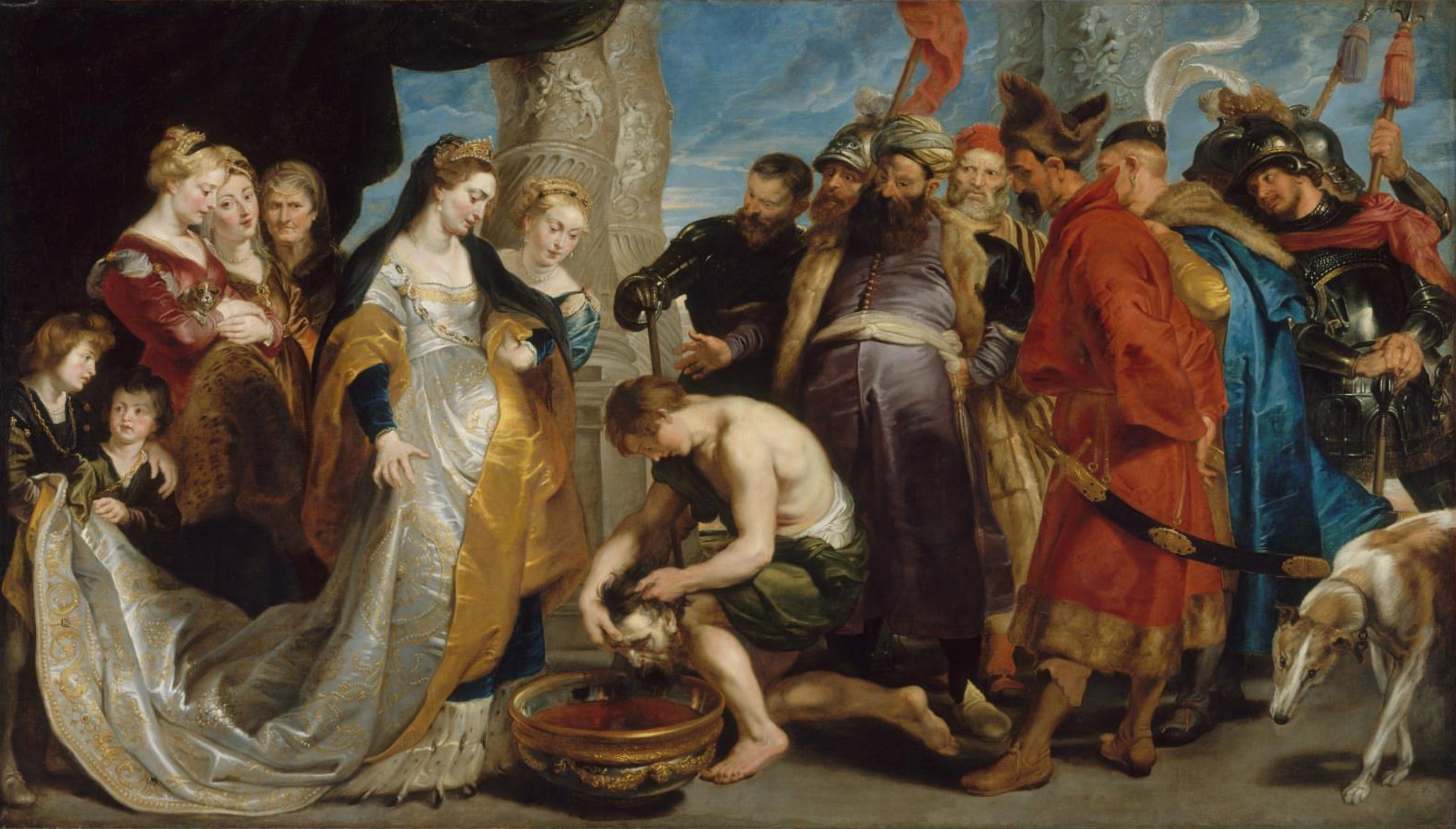
Tomiris (Thomyris) portrayed by Rubens

Thomyris, Queen of Scythia was a pasticcio opera based on a libretto by Peter Anthony Motteux. It was produced by John James Heidegger at the Theatre Royal, Drury Lane in April 1707. Motteux's prologue directly referenced Anne, Queen of Great Britain, under whose reign female stage protagonists were very popular.

== Action ==
The opera is named after the historical queen Tomyris, mentioned by Herodotus as the killer of Cyrus the Great. However the action of the opera is based on a love triangle between entirely fictional characters; Thomyris’ son prince Orontes and the Armenian king Tigranes, who are rivals for the affections of the Persian princess Cleora. Cleora, held captive by Orontes, falls in love with him although she is betrothed to Tigranes.

The original 1707 version of the opera concludes when Thomyris intervenes to prevent the Scythians from sacrificing Cleora; she has received false news of Orontes's death, while Tigranes is wounded in battle. In the 1709 version, Orontes reveals to the wounded Tigranes that Cleora, captured as a baby and brought up by Cyrus as his own daughter, is in fact Thomyris’ daughter and thus his own sister. Cleora and Tigranes can then marry, securing peace between Scythia and Persia.

== Music ==
The recitatives for the opera were composed by Johann Christoph Pepusch, who also adapted the 56 arias in the work from music by Francesco Gasparini, Giovanni Bononcini, Alessandro Scarlatti and Agostino Steffani. The overture and closing chaconne were by Charles Dieupart.

== Changing languages ==
The original cast were Pepusch's future wife Margherita de L'Epine, soprano (Thomyris), Francis Hughs, countertenor (Orontes), (later replaced by Valentino Urbani) Catherine Tofts (Cleora), Mr Lawrence, tenor (Tigranes), Richard Leveridge, bass, (Baldo) and Mary Lindsey, soprano (Media).

With its original cast, the opera was first performed in English. Before long however Francis Hughs was replaced by the castrato Valentino Urbani. Urbani had premiered in London in Camilla in 1706, and he took over the role of Orontes in Thomyris. The subscribers wished to hear him singing in Italian, so he did, with the other parts in the opera still performed in English. By the time of its 1709 revival two more Italian singers had been added to the cast, and they too had their arias translated from English into Italian.

The libretto for Thomyris was published in both English and Italian so that the audience could follow the action. However the English and Italian pages were not aligned, making it difficult to read across line by line. The songs from the opera were published by John Walsh and were very popular. Walsh was obliged to reduce the price of his edition in 1707 when John Cullen published a rival one, and he discounted it again in 1709 in the face of rival editions.

== Revivals ==
The opera was revised by Nicola Francesco Haym and staged again on 10 April 1708. Margherita de L'Epine was moved to the male role of Tigranes, while the title role of Thomyris was undertaken by Haym's wife, Joanna Maria Linchenham. There were cuts to the original work to shorten the opera and speed up the action. Thus for example in Act three the number of arias was reduced from twenty to twelve. Overall much of Pepusch's work was cut.

For the 1709/10 season Thomyris was revived once again. This time the main attraction was the famous and very expensive castrato Nicolini appearing as Tigranes, on 17, 21 and 24 November, 6 and 20 December 1709, and 3 January and 23 February 1710.

Thomyris was so popular that it was revived several times between 1716 and 1728. Pepusch was involved in revising the work again, with these versions being sung entirely in English. For the 1718 revival he composed seven new arias. In total it had 43 performances between 1707 and 1728. However public taste was changing, eventually favouring opera sung entirely in Italian.
