= Rosamund Clifford =

Mistress of King Henry II of England

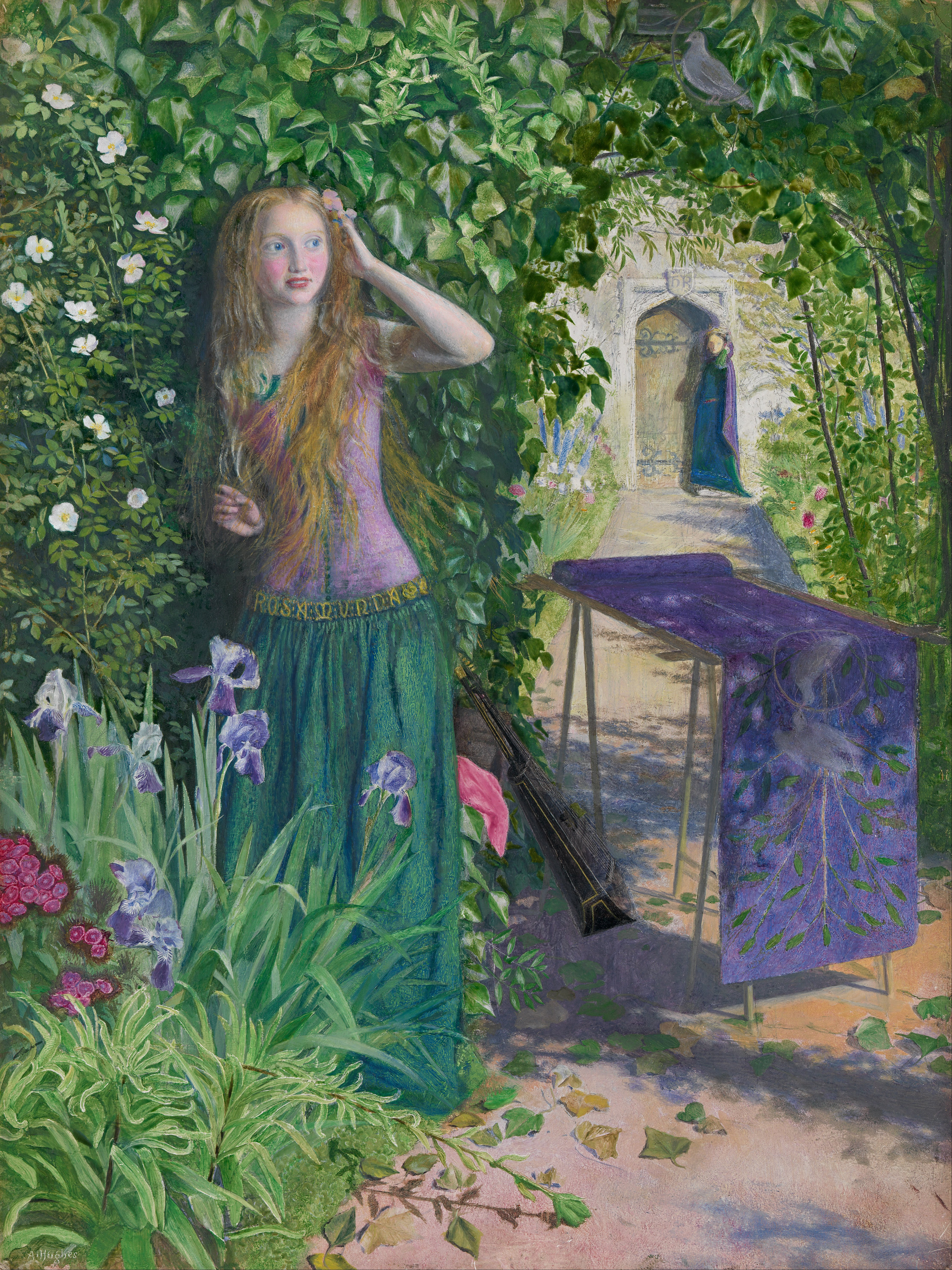
- Fair Rosamund hiding from the queen in her bower, Arthur Hughes, 1854
- Born: unknown Clifford Castle, Hereford
- Died: c. 1176; Godstow Abbey, Godstow
- Companion: Henry II of England
- Father: Walter de Clifford
- Mother: Margaret

Rosamund Clifford (possibly before 1140 – c. 1176), often called "The Fair Rosamund" or "Rose of the World" (Latin: rosa mundi), was a medieval English noblewoman and mistress of King Henry II. Their relationship seems to have begun in 1166, and lasted several years, though reliable information is lacking. After it ended she retired to a convent, where she died about 1176.

She became famous in English folklore and the arts, the subject of numerous poems, five operas, plays and paintings, until about 1920. According to the legend, she was placed in "Rosamund's bower" in a separate garden enclosure in the park around Woodstock Palace. The themes of the legend concentrate on her waiting there for her lover, and her confrontation with his formidable wife, Queen Eleanor of Aquitaine.

== Life ==
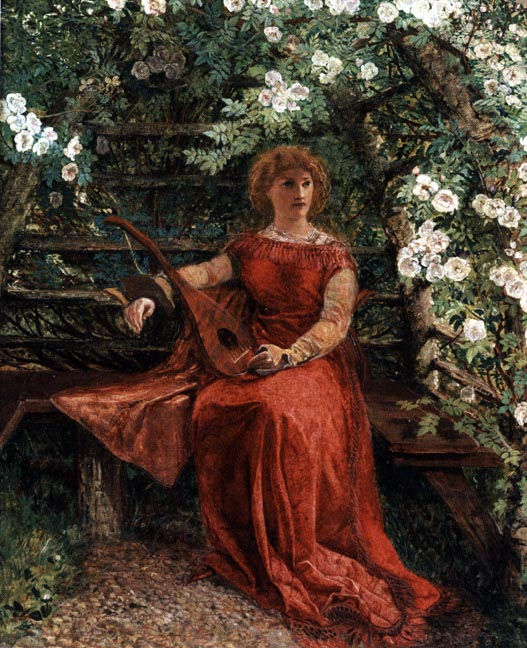
Fair Rosamund in her Bower by William Bell Scott (after 1854)

=== Early life ===
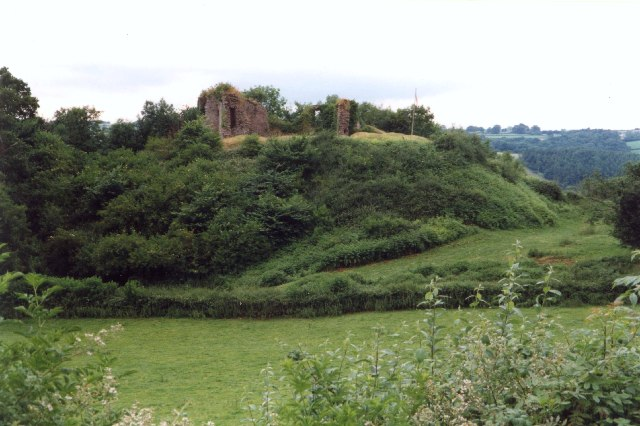
The ruins of Clifford Castle, where Clifford grew up

Rosamund Clifford was the daughter of Walter de Clifford, a marcher lord, and his wife Margaret de Toeni. Her date of birth is uncertain. Some sources place it in 1140 or possibly even earlier, possibly due to the traditional identification of Rosamund as the mother of at least one of Henry II's illegitimate children (William the Longespee and Geoffrey, the archbishop of York) – indicating that she had already become Henry II's mistress by the early 1150s. On the other hand, Gerald of Wales describes her as a puella (a girl or a young woman) at the time of her death in 1176. She was certainly of age by 1166. Rosamund had three brothers, Walter (c. 1160 – 1221), Richard and Gilbert, and two sisters: Amice, and Lucy.

Her name likely came from the Latin phrase rosa mundi, meaning "rose of the world." Clifford was first raised at her father's Clifford Castle, then sent to a convent of Benedictine nuns in Godstow Abbey for education.

=== Henry II's mistress ===
Clifford was reputed as one of the greatest beauties of the 12th century. Her relationship with Henry II, King of England (1133–1189) supposedly started when his wife, Queen Eleanor (c. 1122 – 1204) was pregnant with their last child, John (1166–1216) in 1166, but the king publicly acknowledged the affair for the first time in 1174. The queen is thought to have given birth to John in Beaumount Palace instead of Woodstock Palace because Clifford lived at Woodstock. Alison Weir, in her biography of Eleanor, thinks this unlikely and dismisses it as "another example of the unsupported fictions that have attached themselves to Rosamund's name". Accounts differ on whether Clifford stayed in Woodstock while the king was travelling between England and his continental lands or accompanied him. If she did not go with him, they could not have spent more than about a quarter of the time between 1166 and 1176 together.

=== Later life and death ===
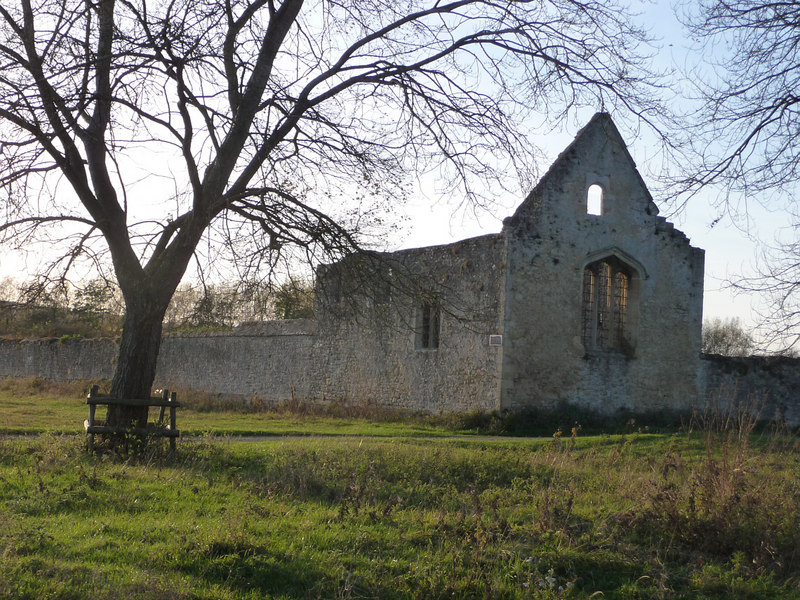
The ruins of Godstow Abbey

When her relationship with the king ended, Rosamund retired to Godstow Abbey. She died there around 1176, before the age of 40, and she was buried there. Her death was commemorated at Hereford Cathedral on 6 July, the same day on which Henry II died, 13 years after her. The king and the Clifford family paid for her tomb to be cared for by the Benedictine nuns of the convent. Her resting place became a popular shrine among locals, which was noticed by Hugh of Lincoln, the Bishop of Lincoln in 1191. Seeing the flowers and candles that covered the tomb, he ordered her remains to be moved and buried outside, "with the rest, that the Christian religion may not grow into contempt, and that other women, warned by her example, may abstain from illicit and adulterous intercourse". Clifford's body was moved to the cemetery by the nuns' chapter house and was destroyed during the dissolution of the monasteries (1536–1541) under Henry VIII. The ruins of the abbey still stand and are open to the public.

Paul Hentzner, a German traveller who visited England around 1599, recorded that her faded tombstone inscription read in part:

... Adorent,
Utque tibi detur requies Rosamunda precamur.

Translation:

Let them adore,
And we pray that rest be given to you, Rosamund.

Followed by a rhyming epitaph:

Hic jacet in tumba Rosamundi non Rosamunda,
Non redolet sed olet, quae redolere solet.

— Quoted by Hentzner, Travels in England
Translation:

Here in the tomb lies the rose of the world, not a pure rose;
She who used to smell sweet, still smells—but not sweet.

Accounts from the time of its destruction report that, along with other engravings, the tomb contained the depiction of a chalice.

=== Possible issue ===
Historians are divided whether Clifford's relationship with Henry II produced children. Legends have attributed to her two of the king's illegitimate sons, Geoffrey, Archbishop of York (c. 1152 – 1212) and William Longespée, 3rd Earl of Salisbury (c. 1176 – 1226). However, Geoffrey was born before the king and Clifford even met from an otherwise unknown woman (possibly called Ykenai or Hikenai), and William was the son of Ida de Tosny, Countess of Norfolk (died after 1181).

== The legend ==
=== In folklore ===
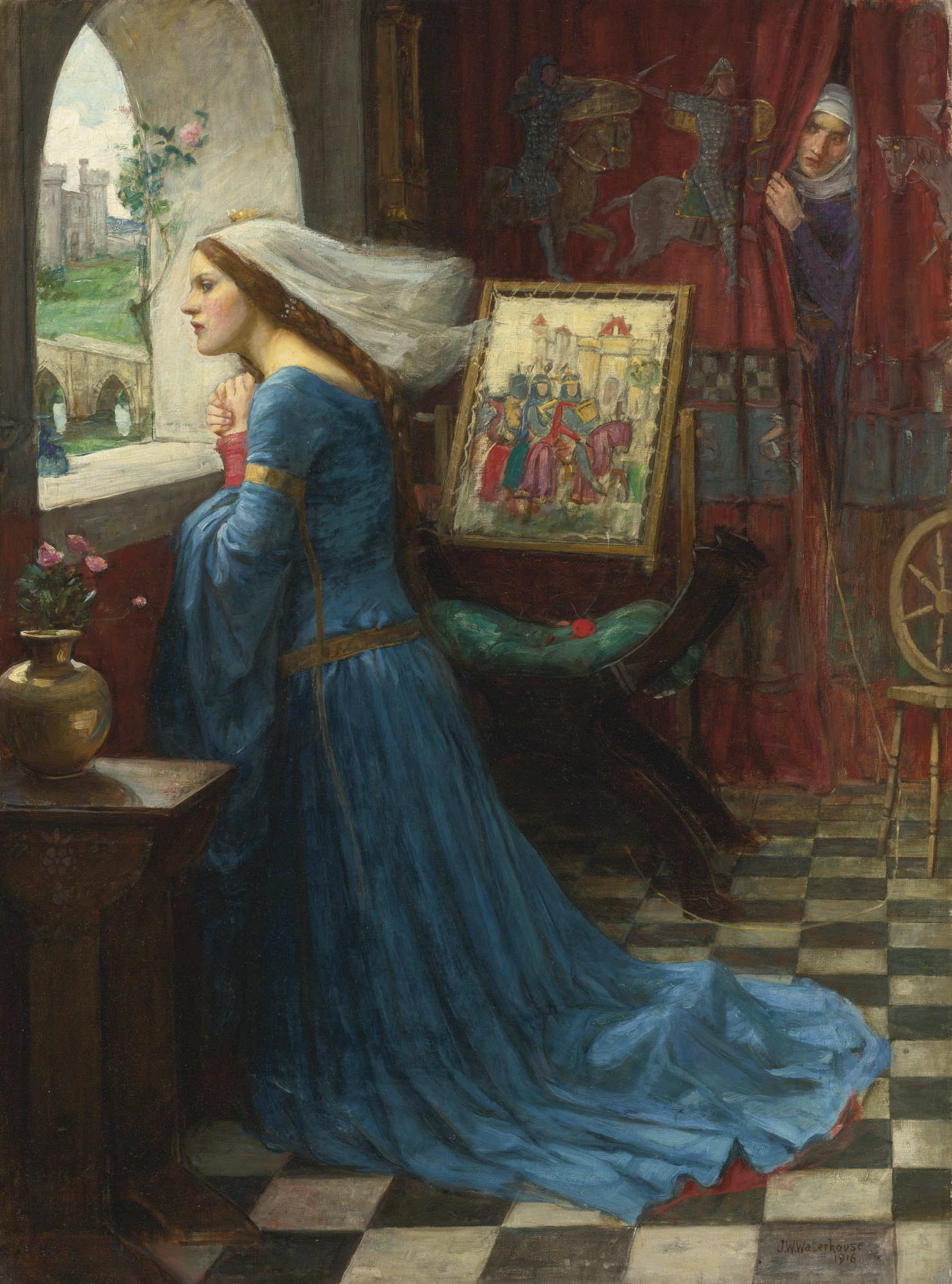
Fair Rosamund by John William Waterhouse (1917)

In English folklore, Rosamund's legend states that the king did everything to hide his affair from his wife, Queen Eleanor. He saw Rosamund only in the middle of "Rosamund's Bower", a separate enclosed garden, sometimes described with a building in the middle, in the park of Woodstock Palace in Oxfordshire. Several decades later, Henry II's grandson Henry III certainly established or expanded a "herber" or separate enclosed pleasure garden, in Woodstock Park, which was large enough for some costs to appear in his household accounts. This was a common feature of grand medieval gardens. In 1251 he built high walls around it, and in 1261 planted 100 pear trees. What was there a century earlier is uncertain.

In later fantastical elaborations the "bower" is sometimes described as a complicated labyrinth, perhaps underground; mazes or "labyrinths" were part of some of the grandest continental pleasure parks, for example Hesdin, but modern historians see no evidence for English examples this early.

According to the legend, after hearing rumours, the queen made her way inside and confronted her rival, forcing her to choose between a dagger and a bowl of poison; Rosamund chose the poison and died. Contemporary chronicler John Brompton did not recount this incident in his account of the events, and it first appeared in the 14th-century French Chronicle of London.

Another version tells that Rosamund was roasted between two fires, stabbed, and left to bleed to death in a bath of scalding water by the queen. During the Elizabethan era, such stories gained popularity, leading to the writing of the Ballad of Fair Rosamund by Thomas Deloney (1612) and the Complaint of Rosamund by Samuel Daniel (1592), both being purely fictional. The underground labyrinth was added to the tale in 1516 (although Robert Gambles cites a 1231 reference to "Rosamund's chamber", with gardens, a cloister and a well), drawing on the story of Estrildis, mistress of king Locrinus, who had underground apartments built to hide her from his wife. The cup of poison first appears in a ballad in 1611.

According to most medieval chroniclers, Queen Eleanor had been imprisoned by 1173 for raising her sons to be rebellious against their father, making a direct confrontation between the two women improbable.

Depictions of the legendary confrontation between Queen Eleanor and Rosamund Clifford

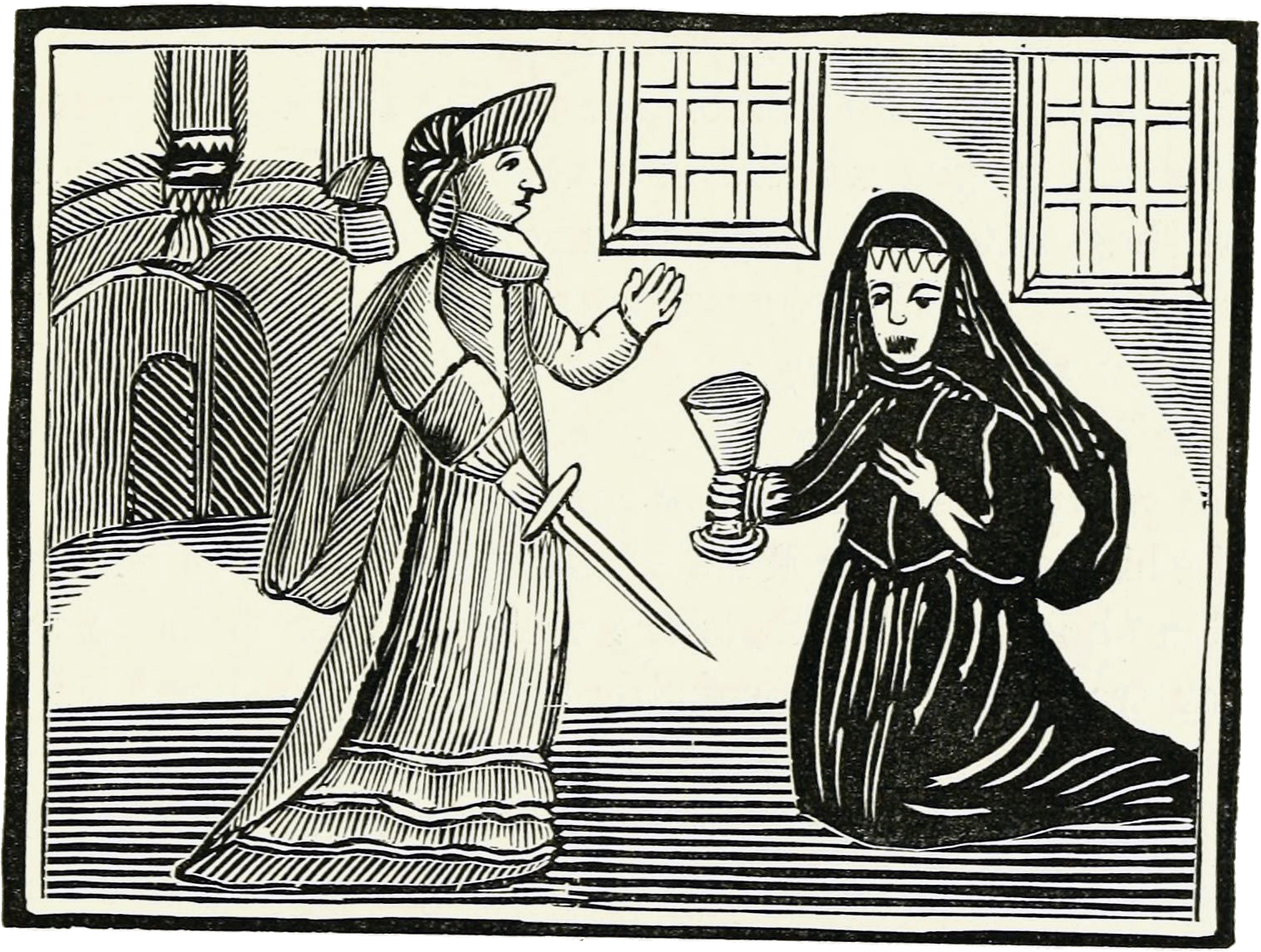
An illustration from an 18th-century chapbook

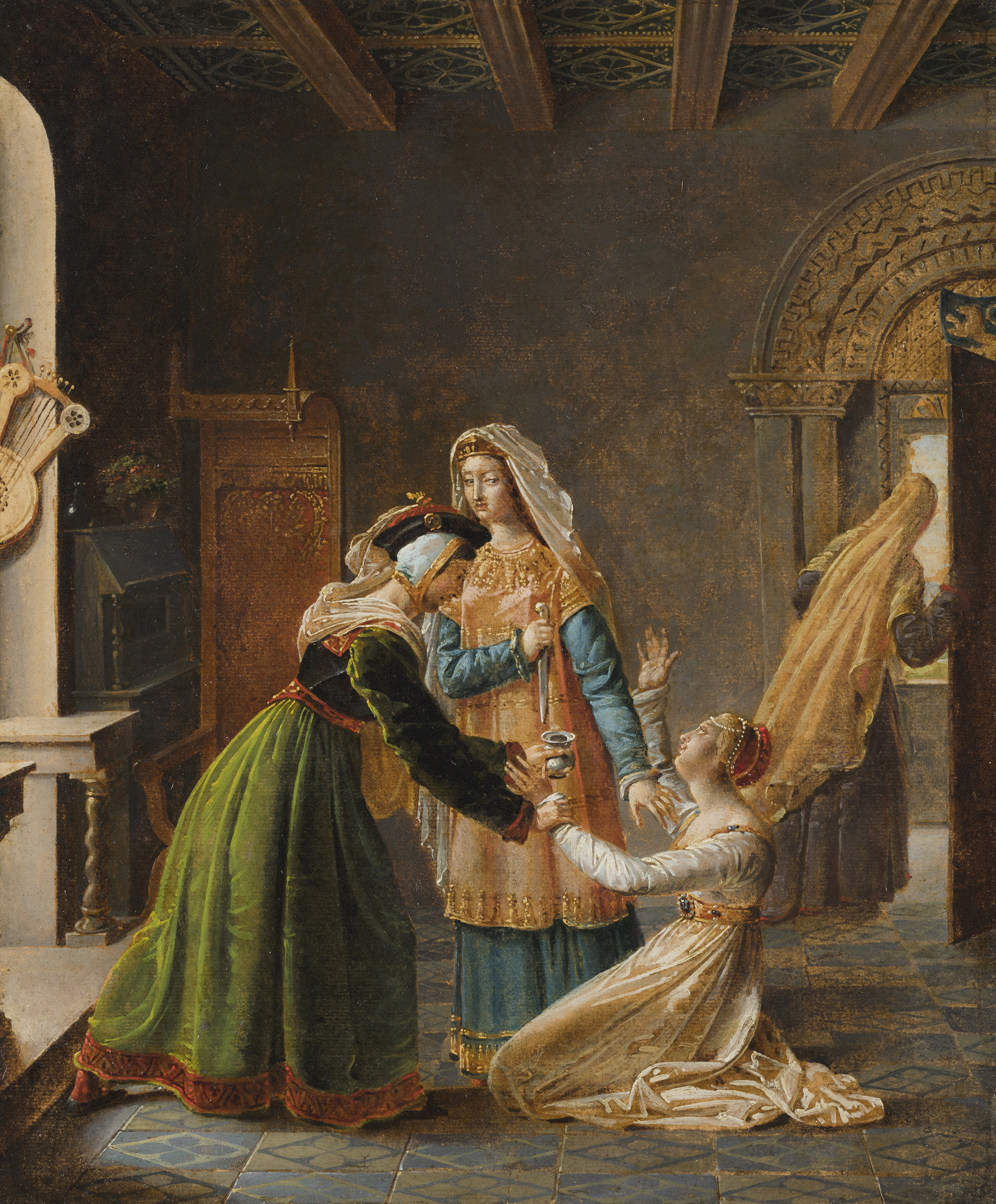
Marie-Philippe Coupin de la Couperie's circa 1826 painting

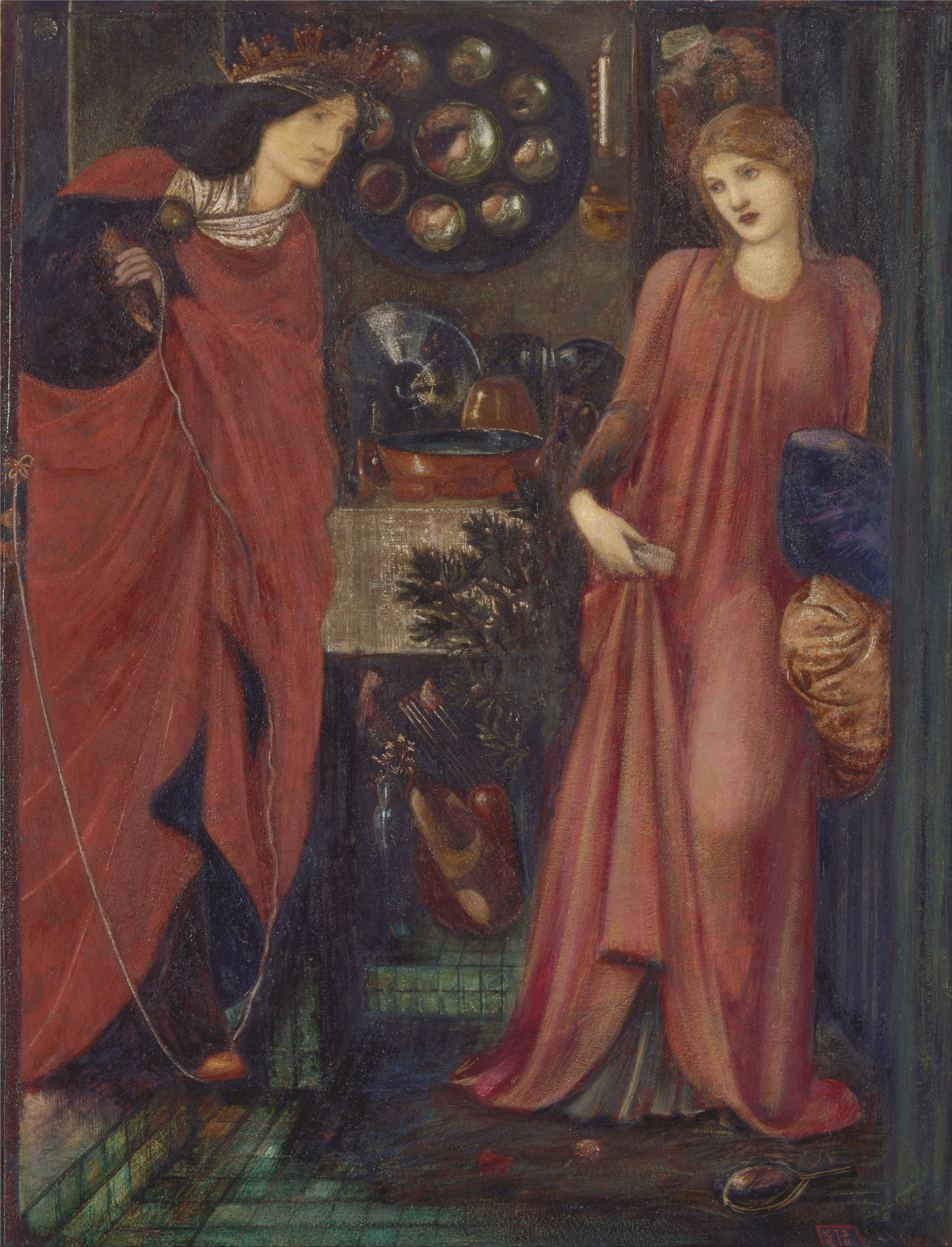
Edward Burne-Jones' painting from 1861

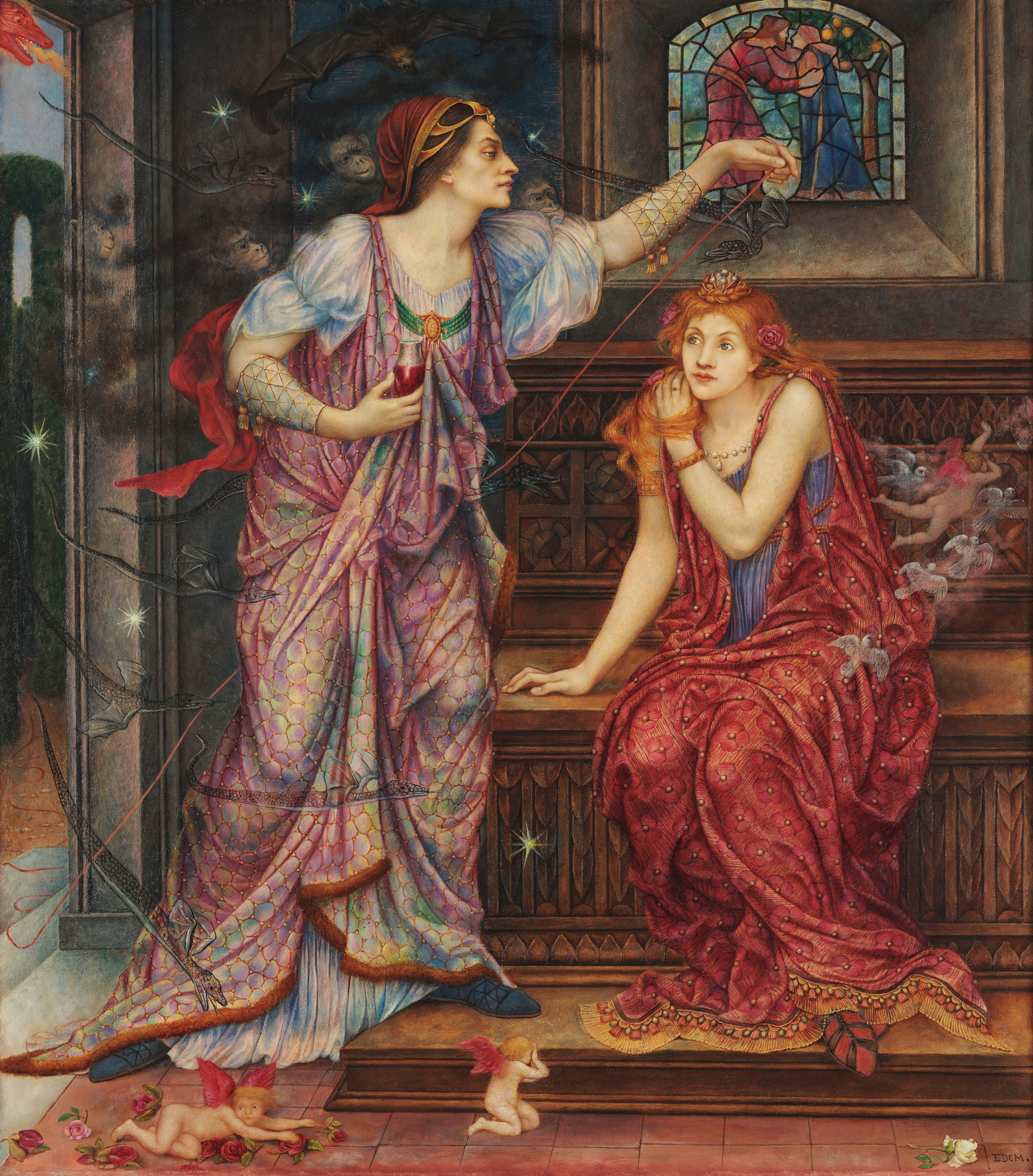
Evelyn De Morgan's Pre-Raphaelite painting from between 1880 and 1919

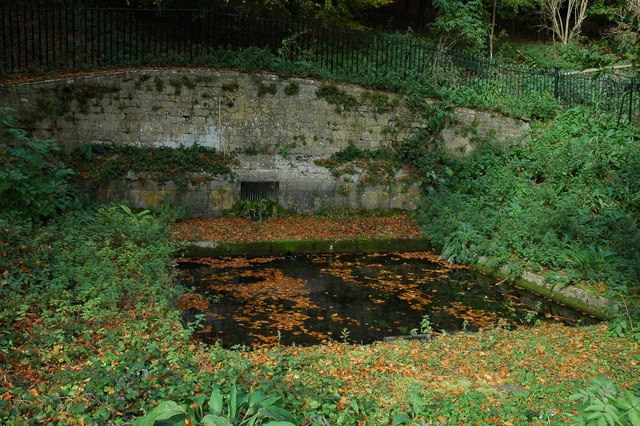
Fair Rosamund's Well in the park of Blenheim Palace

=== Fair Rosamund's Well and Rosamund's Green ===
According to local tales, and probably reality, what remained of "Rosamund's bower" was demolished when Blenheim Palace was built in the early 18th century, and the park landscaped; the ruins of Woodstock Palace were also destroyed, with stone being used for the new palace. Today, Fair Rosamund's Well (51.845070°N 1.3677058°W) is a paved spring in the park of Blenheim Palace in Woodstock, Oxfordshire. It is located to the south of the Grand Bridge on the western shore of The Lake, sometimes called Brown's Lake after 18th-century landscape architect Capability Brown. According to a 2014 BBC article, "[T]he well had become 'somewhat overgrown and at risk of becoming damaged'".

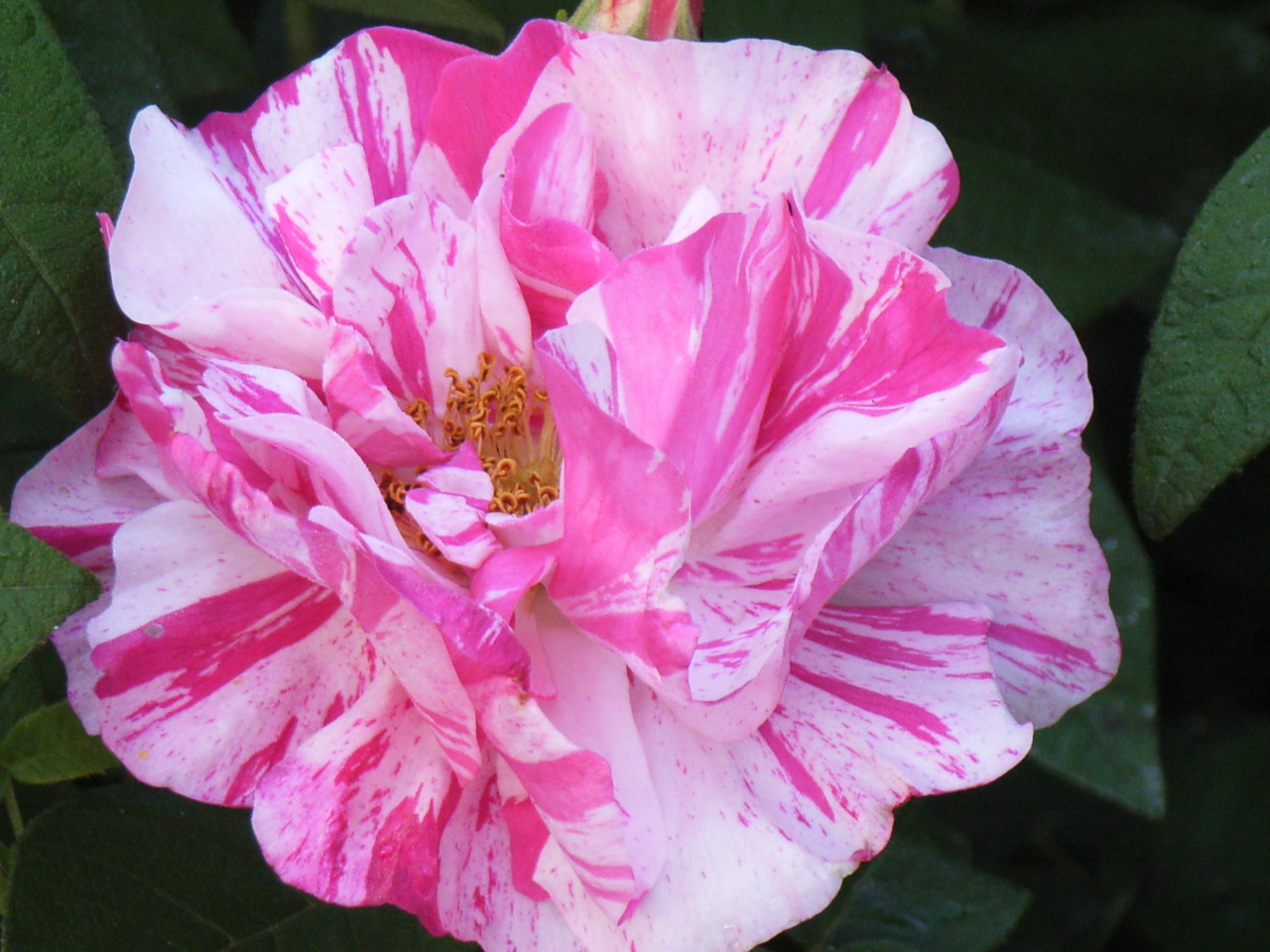
Rosa mundi rose

Rosamund is also associated with the village of Frampton on Severn, Gloucestershire, another of her father's holdings. Walter de Clifford granted the mill there to Godstow Abbey for the good of the souls of his wife and daughter. The village green of Frampton became known as Rosamund's Green by the 17th century.

=== Rosa mundi rose ===
A cultivated variation of Rosa gallica with striped pink blooms is commonly known as rosa mundi. Its association with Rosamund Clifford dates to the 16th century.

=== In fiction ===
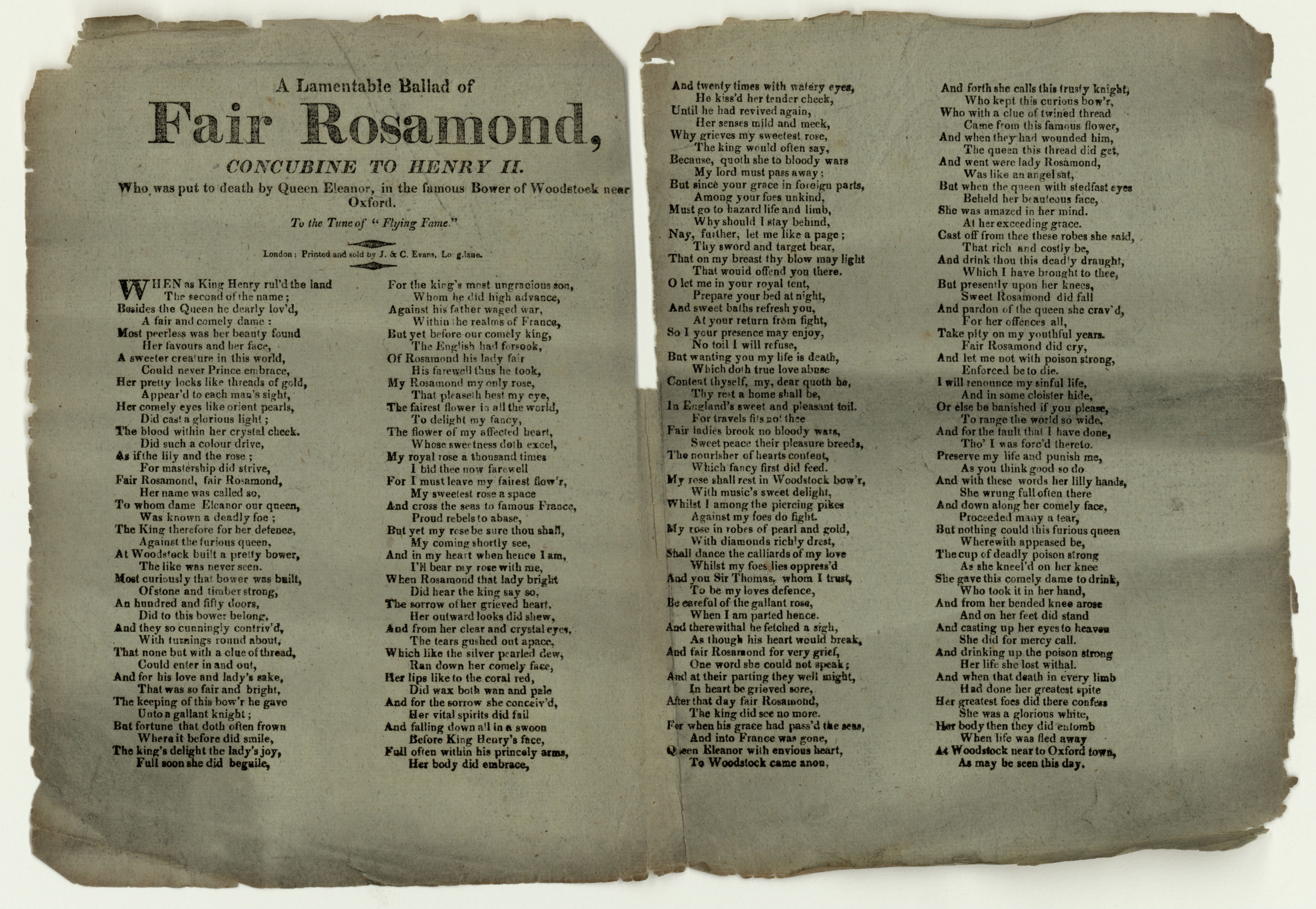
"A Lamentable Ballad of Fair Rosamond, Concubine to Henry II" (c. 1825)

==== In literature ====
Life and death of fair Rosamond, Scottish chapbook, 1800

- The Complaint of Rosamund, a 1592 poem by Samuel Daniel;
- Rosamond, an 1860 verse play by Algernon Swinburne
- The Saint (German: Der Heilige), an 1879 novel by Conrad Ferdinand Meyer;
- Rosemonde, a 1913 poem by Guillaume Apollinaire
- Eleanor the Queen is a 1955 novel by Norah Lofts
- Penmarric, a 1971 family saga by Susan Howatch (as Rose Parrish);
- The Courts of Love: The Story of Eleanor of Aquitaine, a 1987 novel by Jean Plaidy;
- The Falcon and the Flower, a 1988 romance novel by Virginia Henley;
- Wings of the Storm, a 1992 novel by Suzan Sizemore;
- Always, a 2000 novel by Lynsay Sands (mentioned);
- The Book of Eleanor, A Novel of Eleanor of Aquitaine, a 2002 novel by Pamela Kaufman;
- Time and Chance (2002) and Devil's Brood (2008), two novels by Sharon Kay Penman;
- Death at Blenheim Palace, a 2006 novel by Robin Paige;
- The Death Maze (in the U.S.: The Serpent's Tale), a 2008 novel by Ariana Franklin;
- The Time of Singing, a 2008 novel by Elizabeth Chadwick (mentioned);
- The Captive Queen: A Novel of Eleanor of Aquitaine, a novel by 2010 by Alison Weir;
- The Winter Crown, a 2014 novel by Elizabeth Chadwick;
- La Révolte (The Revolt), a 2018 French novel by Clara Dupont-Monod
- Nest of the Gyrfalcon, a 2024 novel by G. Lawrence
- Eaglets, a 2024 novel by G. Lawrence

==== In opera ====
- Rosamond, a 1707 opera by Thomas Clayton to a libretto by Joseph Addison;
- Rosamond, a 1733 opera by Thomas Arne to Joseph Addison’s libretto;
- Rosamund, a 1780 German Singspiel by Anton Schweitzer to a libretto by Christoph Martin Wieland;
- Rosmonda d'Inghilterra ("Rosamund of England") is an 1834 Italian opera by Gaetano Donizetti;
- Fair Rosamond is an 1837 opera by John Barnett

==== In cinema ====
- The Lion in Winter is a 1968 adaptation of the play of the same name (alluded to).

==== In theatre ====
- Henry II is a 1692 play by William Mountfort;
- The Lion in Winter is a 1966 play by James Goldman (alluded to).

==== In Transport ====
GWR 517 class locomotive No 1473 was named 'Fair Rosamund', to work a royal train on the Blenheim and Woodstock branch line. The locomotive was then regularly used for the Woodstock branch in subsequent years.

== Sources ==
- Biography from Who's Who in British History (1998), H. W. Wilson Company. Who's Who in British History, Fitzroy Dearborn Publishers, 1998.
- W. L. Warren, Henry II, 1973.
