= Rosamond (Clayton) =

Opera by Thomas Clayton

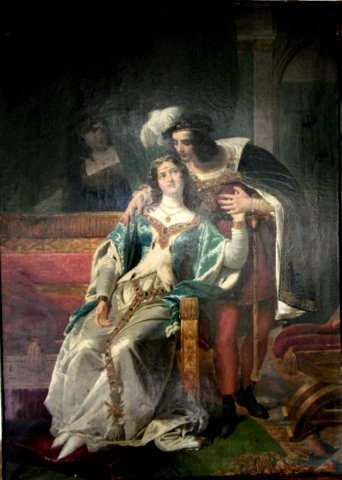
Rosamond and Henry II

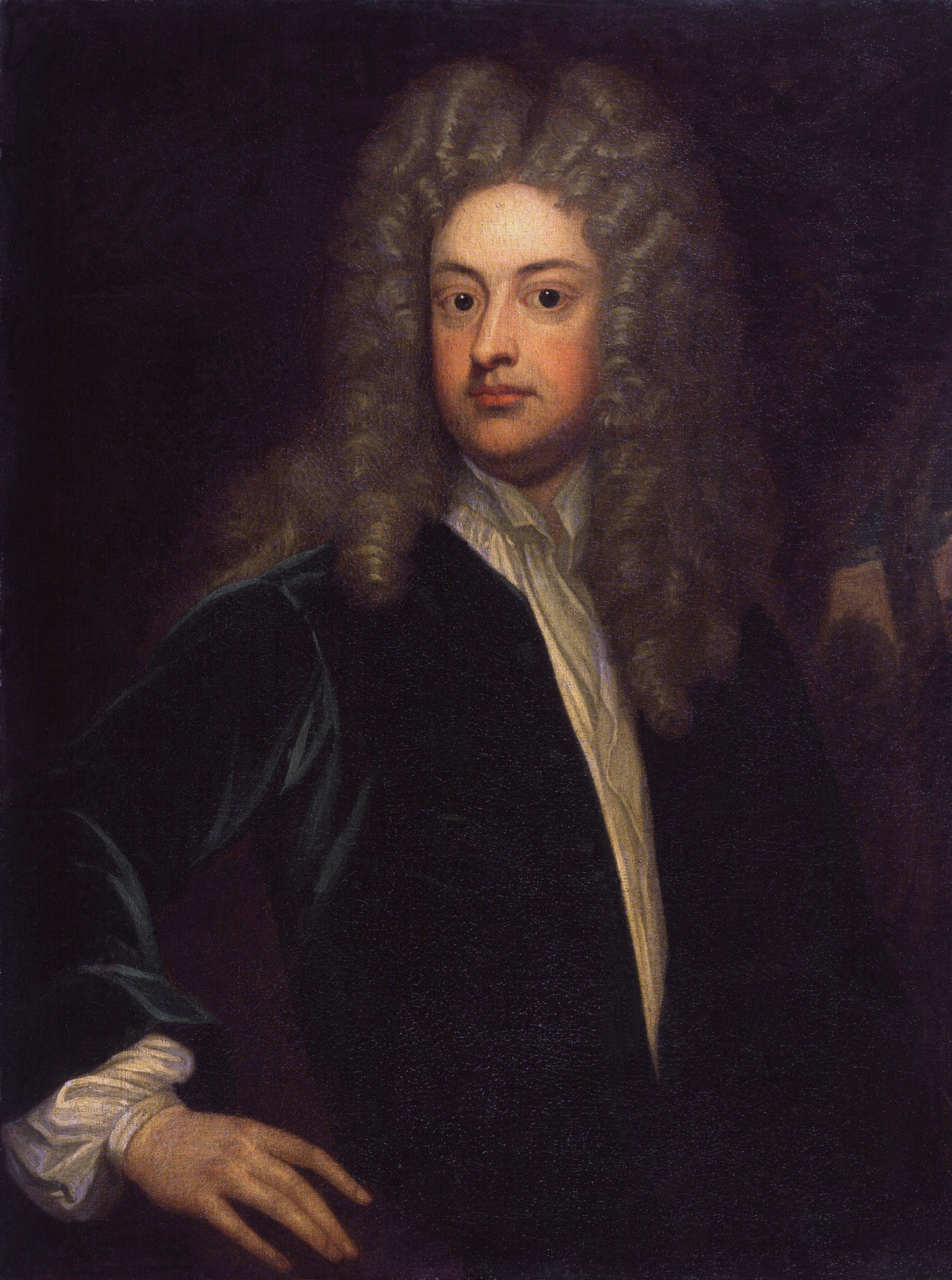
Joseph Addison

Rosamond is an Opera in three acts by Thomas Clayton with a libretto by Joseph Addison. It was first performed on 4 March 1707 at Drury Lane.

== Development ==
Addison and Clayton both objected to the new practice of having parts of operas performed in London sung in Italian; they felt that the texts used should be examples of the finest literary English. Addison however followed the norm of Italian opera by having three male and three female characters.

In 1705 Clayton had enjoyed considerable success with his opera Arsinoe, Queen of Cyprus which had run for twenty-four nights in its first season, as well as eleven nights the following year. There were three further performances in 1707, but by that time Antonio Maria Bononcini’s Camilla had appeared on the stage, and the public appetite for a better musical experience had moved on.

The cast of Rosamond was Francis Hughes (King Henry), Catherine Tofts (Queen Elinor), Richard Leveridge (Sir Trusty), Miss Gallia (Rosamond) and Miss Lindsey as Grideline. This was the same cast as had performed Arsinoe, suggesting that Addison was seeking to introduce his English libretto to a company of singers who had already shown they could achieve great success.

== Action ==
The action is drawn, with the exception of its ending and a comic subplot, from the poem The Death of Rosamond by Thomas Deloney. The opera concerns the story of Rosamond Clifford, mistress of Henry II of England. A jealous Queen Elinor poisons her but she recovers, and Henry repents of his sin. While Queen Elinor regains her husband's love by appealing to his sense of destiny, a comic subplot involves Sir Trusty and his wife Grideline, and the interplay between the two is similar to the ‘split-plot’ plays of John Dryden.

The opera emphasised the importance of unity and Britishness, contrasting the gentle character of Rosamond with the vengeful French queen. It was accompanied by a prologue that compared Marlborough to Henry II, and at the climax of the story the sleeping Henry sees a vision of the future of the spot where he is resting and a huge plan of Blenheim Palace is unfurled on stage.

The opera seemed full of absurdities, for example when King Henry approaches the bower where he meets Rosamond, there is a fanfare of instruments and the verse proclaims: ‘Hark, hark! What sound invades me ear? The conqueror's approach I hear.’ Rosamond herself dies in the second act and this loss is ‘not compensated by a single interesting event in the third.’

== Critical reception ==
The production was a disaster and the opera closed after just three nights. Clayton's music was described as ‘a jargon of sounds.’ Roger Fisk described it as ‘cretinous.’ Charles Burney said that Addison ‘never manifested a greater want of taste and intelligence in music than when he employed Clayton to set his opera of Rosamond.”

In 1837 John Barnett created another opera on the same theme, Fair Rosamond, and The Spectator reminded its readers that Clayton's Rosamond had been ‘an utter failure’ that ‘had the effect of paralysing every effort to perpetuate or revive the fading glory of English dramatic music. Clayton's Rosamond was the funeral dirge of the English opera.’

Addison never wrote another libretto. Clayton wrote music for a work called 'The Passion of Sappho, and Feast of Alexander’ that was performed at his house in York Buildings, but he appears never to have written again for a professional production.

== Legacy ==
The score was published in 1707 by John Walsh and P. Randall. The libretto was published by Jacob Tonson in the same year.

After the failure of Rosamund there were no further attempts to write a libretto in English until 1733, when Addison's libretto was set to new music by Thomas Arne.

== See also ==
- Rosamond, 1733 opera by Thomas Arne
