= Maria Gallia =

18th-century British opera singer

Maria Gallia (incorrectly called Maria Margherita by Burney), was an Italian-born British soprano.

== Life ==
Gallia was described by Burney as the sister of Margherita de l'Epine. L'Epine did have a sister called Maria (Manina) but she did not appear on the London stage as a soloist until 1712.

Gallia was the pupil of Nicola Haym.

She appeared for the first time at the Lincoln's Inn Fields Theatre, in 1703 when she had "newly arrived". She sang in 1706 and 1708 in 'Camilla,' in the libretti of which she is called Joanna Maria. In the former year she also performed the principal rôle in the 'Temple of Love' by Saggione, to whom she was then married. Documents signed by this composer, and by his wife as Maria Gallia Saggione, show that they received respectively £150 and £700 for a season of nine months,—large sums at that early date.

Gallia appeared in Clayton's Rosamond at its production in 1707. She sang songs also at the Haymarket Theatre 'in Italian and English,' to strengthen the attraction. At this time she must have been very young, for we find her singing in 'Alexander Balus,' 'Joshua,' &c. in 1748; unless, indeed, her name is incorrectly put for that of Galli.
