= Maria Manina =

Italian opera singer

- Born: 16??
- Died: 17??
- Known for: singing
- Spouses: Mr Fletcher, Mr Seedo/Sydow

Maria Manina, later Maria Fletcher later Maria Seedo/Sydow, (fl. 1712-1736) was an Italian opera and concert singer. She came to notice in London in 1712 and was last recorded in Potsdam in 1736.

== Life ==
Her place and date of birth are unknown and although her sister is known to be the very successful singer Margherita de l'Epine, their parents are also unknown. Her sister, Margherita, began her career in 1703 and it is thought that Maria was working in the same company at the Queen's Theatre, Haymarket for some time before she was named.

In 1712 she was first named when she sang in John Hughes' Calypso and Telemachus on 17 May 1712. She had been reputably paid £100 to sing the role by Heidegger. She appeared as Eucharis singing, Gay, Young, and Fair. In 1713 confusion arose after she appeared as Clitia in Handel's Teseo, being named as 'La Sorella della Sig. Margarita'. Charles Burney confused her with Maria Gallia and he recorded that Gallia sang the role and that Gallin was L'Epine's sister. This mistake has been repeated elsewhere.

Manina continued to get smaller roles at the Queen's Theatre until 1715 when she appeared elsewhere. She sang at the Lincoln's Inn Fields Theatre on 6 October 1715 and on 2 January 1717 she was given the title role of Giovanni Bononcini's Camilla which was presented in English. She was working until 1721 when a benefit concert took place.

Nothing is heard of her until 1726 when her role as Camilla is revived and it went for 20 more performances at the Lincoln's Inn Fields. She appeared in male parts in Johann Christoph Pepusch’s "Venus and Adonis" and "Myrtillo" in 1730 and in pantomime afterpieces there in 1731. The following year she sang Charles John Frederick Lampe’s "Britannia" at the New Haymarket. She was at that theatre until 1732 although she had changed her name to Sydow or Seedo due to her marriage in 1727 to Seedo.

In May 1736 she is last mentioned where she was in Potsdam in Prussia. Her husband had been appointed as the musical director for Friedrich Wilhelm I. When her husband had been put forward for the job it had been recorded that his wife could sing well.
