= Jean de La Chapelle =

French writer and dramatist

Jean de la Chapelle
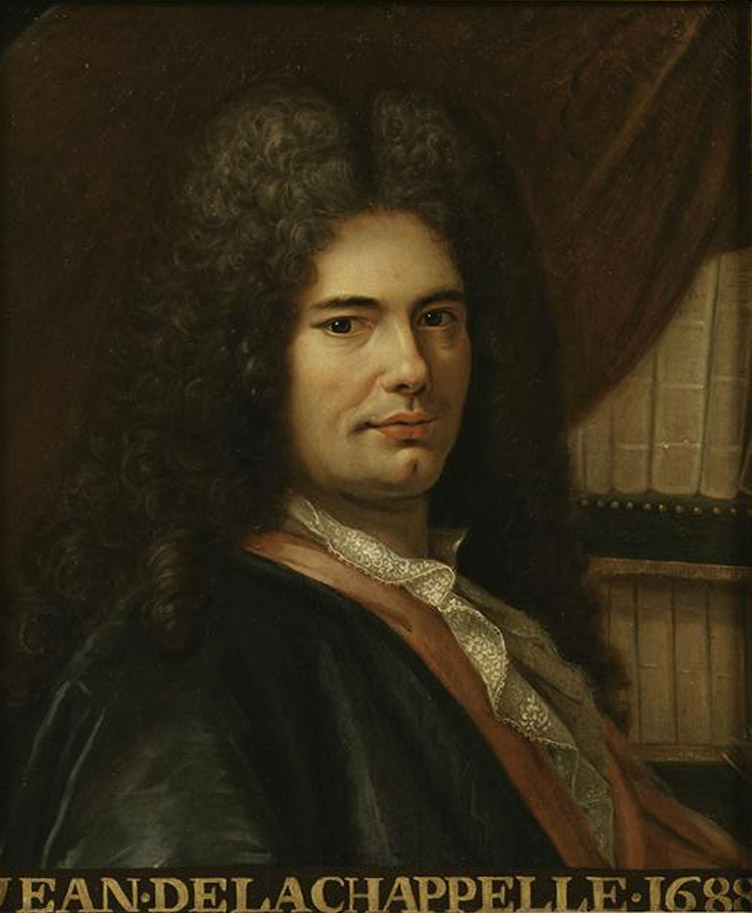
- Born: 24 October 1651; Bourges, France
- Died: 29 May 1723 (aged 71); Paris, France

Jean de La Chapelle (French pronunciation: [ʒɑ̃ də la ʃapɛl]; 24 October 1651 – 29 May 1723) was a French writer and dramatist. He was born at Bourges, Berry (province), France, was elected to the Académie française in 1688, and died in Paris.

== Biography ==
Born into minor nobility, nephew of Nicolas Boileau-Despréaux, his literary talents attracted the attention of Louis Armand I, Prince of Conti, whose assistant he became in 1678. King Louis XIV gave him a number of diplomatic missions to Switzerland to negotiate agreements with the Principality of Neuchâtel.

Benefiting from a sizeable personal fortune, La Chapelle wrote and staged tragedies inspired by classical antiquity at the Comédie-Française: Zaïde, Téléphonte, Cléopâtre, Ajax. His connections and the skill of the actor Michel Baron brought them success in the theatre, but none survived to join the standard repertoire.

A small prose comedy, Les Carrosses d'Orléans (1680), was on the other hand a genuine success and was frequently staged. It was later adapted into a popular English hit The Stage Coach by George Farquhar and Peter Motteux.

La Chapelle published two romance novels, Les Amours de Catulle (1680) and Les Amours de Tibulle (1700), both including collections of translations from the Latin poets Catullus and Tibullus respectively.

In 1688, La Chapelle was elected chairman of the Académie française, succeeding Antoine Furetière.

In 1695 he purchased the Château of Sainte-Assise; he sold it in 1700 to Jean Glucq.

== Works ==
Tragedies

- Cléopâtre (1681)
- Zaïde (1681)
- Téléphonte (1682)
- Ajax (1684)
- Isaac (1717)

Novels

- Les Amours de Catulle (1680)
- Marie d'Anjou, reine de Majorque (1682)
- Les Amours de Tibulle (1722)

Other

- Les Carrosses d'Orléans (1680)
- Lettres d'un Suisse à un Français, où l'on voit les véritables intérêts des princes et des nations de l'Europe (1703-1711)
- Réflexions politiques et historiques sur l'affaire des princes, avec la requête des pairs de France, la requête des princes légitimez et une réponse à cette dernière requête (1717)
