= Mary Lindsey =

- Born: 1600s
- Died: 1713
- Occupation: Singer

Mary Lindsey known as Mrs Lindsey (fl. 1697 – 1713) was a British singer. She specialised in comedic roles particularly opposite Richard Leveridge. She appeared in the first all-sung operas in the UK in English.

== Life ==
Her birth and education are unknown. She came to notice in 1697 when she had a supporting role at the Dorset Garden Theatre in June and by the end of the year she had sung in "The Imposture Defeated". This was a five part comedy also known as "A Trick to Cheat the Devil." by George Powell.

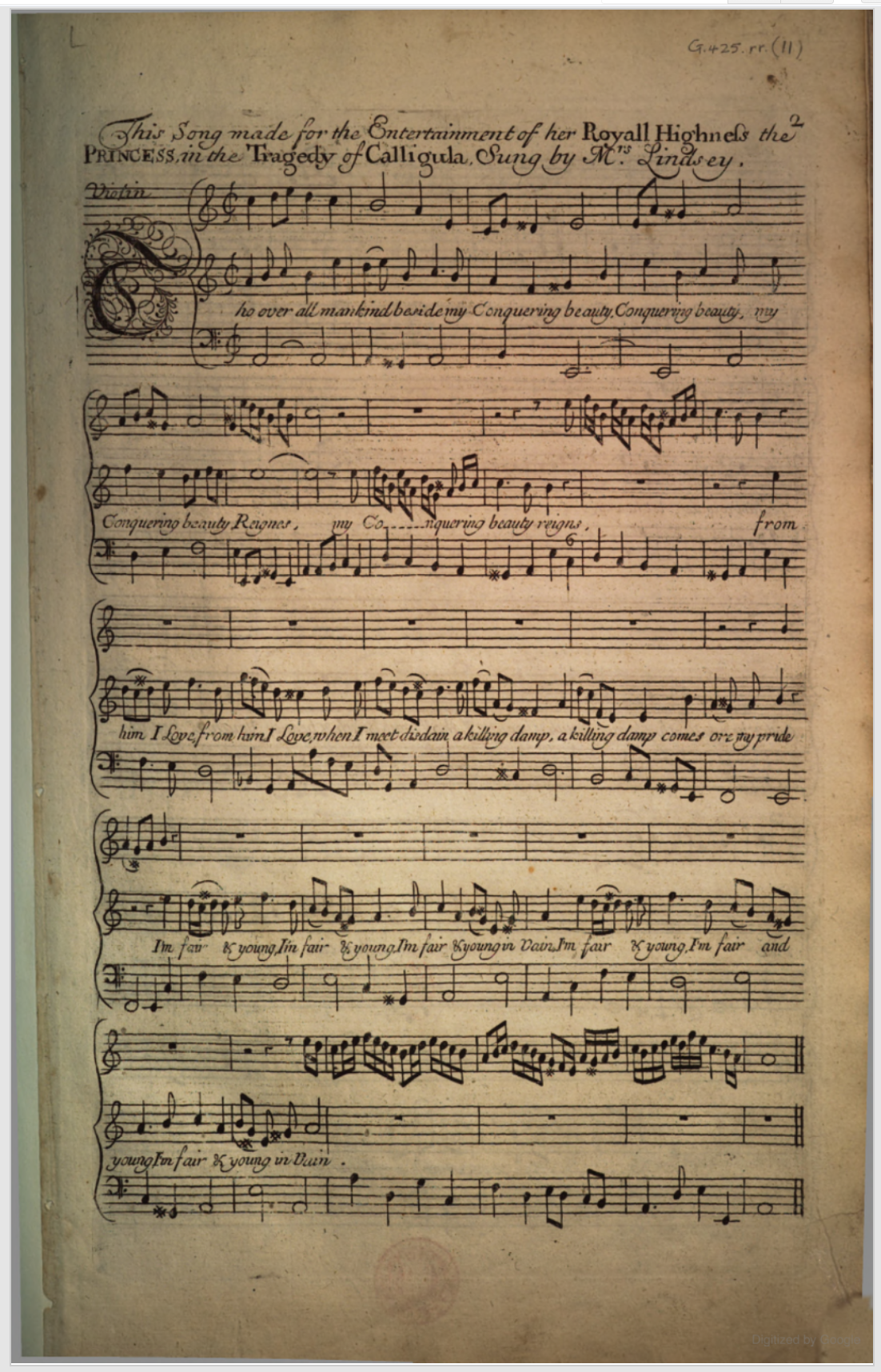
"Tho Over All Mankind" Richard Leveridge's song for Mrs Lindsey to sing to Princess Anne

The following year she sang for Princess Anne performing a special song composed by the bass singer Richard Leveridge when the Princess came to see John Crowne's new play Caligula when it was performed in 1698. In the same year she took a rare acting part in Thomas d'Urfey's satire The Campaigners. She took the part of a nurse, although her major contribution was to sing a comedic lullaby, My dear cockadoodle by Daniel Purcell. She was a mezzo-soprano and she was billed as "Mrs Lindsey" although this does not mean that she was married. In February 1699 she sang interludes at the first performance of Peter Anthony Motteux's semi-opera The Island Princess, at Drury Lane in February 1699. The opera's music was by Daniel Purcell, Richard Leveridge and Jeremiah Clarke.

In 1706 Queen Anne had a "Command Performance" of the "best Singers and Dancers, Foreign and English'". She was chosen to sing in the performance at court and Richard Leveridge was one of the other performers. She appeared in Clayton's Arsinoe, Queen of Cyprus which is said to be the first all-sung opera in English. She and Leveridge appeared again in the first performance of ''Rosamund'' (again) by Clayton. One source reports this as "the first" all-sung opera in English. Lindsey and Leveridge provided a comic sub-plot. Leveridge played a pimp and Lindsey was his wife.

At the beginning of 1708 the companies at the Queen's Theatre at the Haymarket and Drury Lane Theatre were rearranged. John Vanbrugh took all the singers and the actors were left at Drury Lane. Lindsey joined John Vanbrugh's company although she nearly lost her place to an Italian, but her price was too high. Lindsay was paid £2 per performance which was same fee as Leveridge and in addition there was a benefit performance for her in 1709. She chose to repeat the opera "Camilla" for the benefit and her role of the nursemaid, Tullia, opposite Leveridge who plays the younger servant, Linco.

At the end of her life it is thought that she would have been occupied with teaching.
