= Rosamond (Arne) =

1733 opera by Thomas Arne

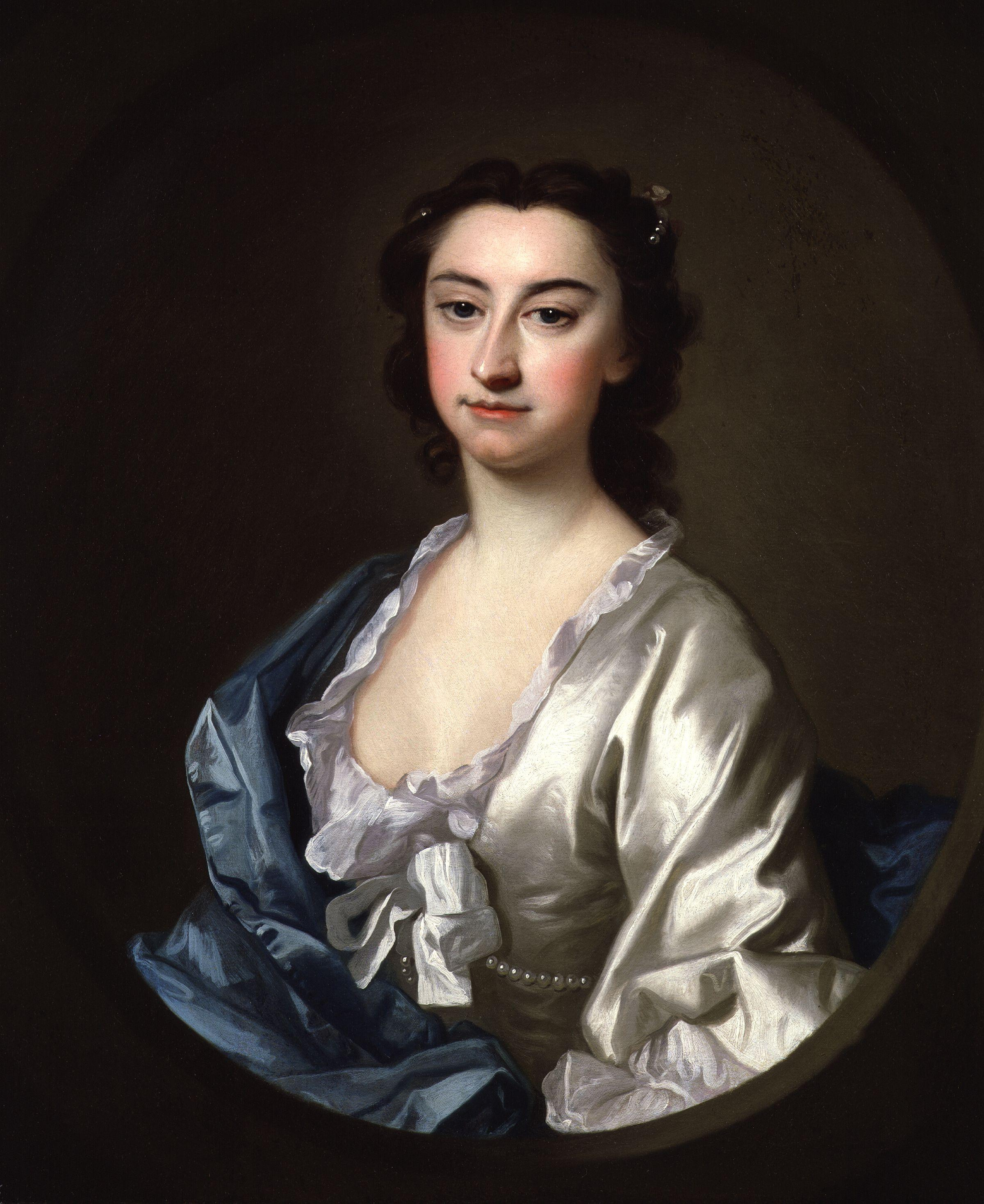
Susannah Arne, who played Rosamond

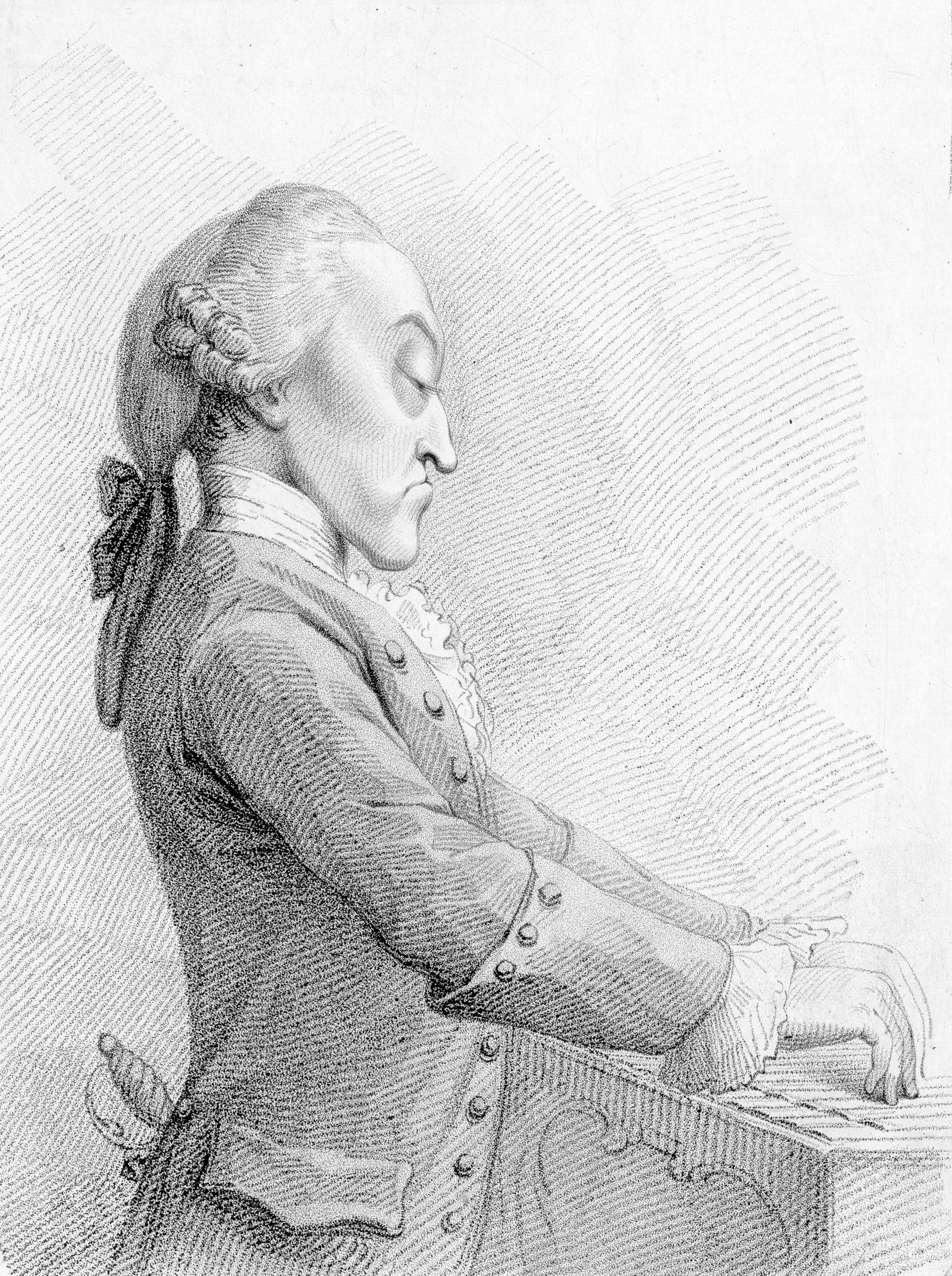
Thomas Arne

Rosamond is an opera by Thomas Arne with a libretto by Joseph Addison. It was first performed at the Lincoln's Inn Fields Theatre in London on 1 March 1733.

== Background ==
Rosamond was the twenty-three year old Arne’s first opera - indeed his first known composition. It was a re-setting of the libretto Addison had written for the 1707 opera Rosamond by Clayton and it made Arne’s reputation as a composer. He taught his sister Susannah and his brother to sing, and they both made their debuts with this work, his sister playing the title role.

== Performance history ==
The 1733 cast was: Jane Barbier (King), Richard Leveridge (Sir Trusty), Richard Arne (page), Miss Jones (Queen), Susannah Arne (Rosamond), and Isabella Chambers (Grideline). The beauty of Arne’s setting and of Susannah’s voice made the opera a success, and it had a run of seven nights. It did not however make money and the vocal score was not published. Its popular airs “Rise, Glory, Rise” and “Was ever nymph like Rosamond” were sung for many years afterwards.

The opera was revived on 8 March 1740 at the Drury Lane Theatre with Mr. Beard as the King, Mrs Arne as Queen Elinor and Kitty Clive as Rosamond.
