= Seedo =

German composer (18th century)

Seedo (also Sidow) (c. 1700 – c. 1754), also called Mr Seedo, as his forename is unknown, was a German composer who worked primarily in England until 1736 when he became musical director to Friedrich Wilhelm I of Prussia.

== Life ==
Seedo was a son of Samuel Peter Sidow, a musician employed by the Elector of Brandenburg. By the mid-1720s, Seedo was working at the Little Theatre in London's Haymarket. On 27 September 1727 he married the singer Maria Manina, who had small parts in London's Italian operas beginning in 1711, including Handel's Teseo.

Between 1731 and 1734, Seedo worked on Drury Lane imitations. He wrote several successful stage works, of which his ballad opera The Devil to Pay was the most successful. When the work was first performed on stage it was a failure, but when the composer cut it significantly, from a full opera of 42 airs to an afterpiece of sixteen airs, it became a hit. Apart from The Beggar's Opera, The Devil to Pay was by far the most popular ballad opera of the 18th century. The work was given regular London performances until well into the 19th century and a translation by C. W. von Borcke made it popular in Austria and the German states as well. Borcke's translation was a major influence on the development of singspiel. He also composed the ballad opera The Lottery with librettist Henry Fielding in 1732.

"Mr Seedo" was also an organist and organ composer in London during the first part of the 18th century; some of his organ Voluntaries are preserved in the John Reading Manuscripts of Dulwich College, London, and have been recorded.

In 1736 his wife appeared singing in a benefit for Seedo as he was in debt. He and Maria Seedo were in Potsdam later that year where Seedo was the musical director to Friedrich Wilhelm I of Prussia.

Seedo died in Potsdam about 1754, a date inferred from payments made to him.

== Sources ==
- Roger Fiske/Irena Cholij. The New Grove Dictionary of Opera, edited by Stanley Sadie (1992), ISBN 0-333-73432-7 and ISBN 1-56159-228-5
