= Thomas Clayton (composer) =

English violinist and composer

Thomas Clayton (1673–1725) was an English violinist and composer, and a member of The King's Musick at the court of William III. His is said to be the first to acclimatise legitimate opera in England.

== Life ==
His father was William Clayton. He studied in Italy, from about 1702 to about 1704, bringing with him (as was said at the time) a considerable quantity of Italian songs which he had collected abroad. These he set to an adaptation by Peter Anthony Motteux of a drama by Stonzani, which had been performed at Bologna in 1677, and at Venice in 1678.

In association with Nicola Haym and Charles Dieupart, Clayton entered upon a series of opera performances at Drury Lane Theatre — the first venture of the kind in the annals of the English stage. The first season began on Tuesday, 16 Jan. 1705, with Arsinoe, Queen of Cyprus, the work which Clayton had vamped up from his Italian gleanings. It was announced as 'a new opera, after the Italian manner, all sung,' with recitatives instead of spoken dialogue. It seems to have attained some success, though a contemporary writer (supposed to be Galliard) says 'there is nothing in it but a few sketches of antiquated Italian airs, so mangled and sophisticated, that instead of Arsinoe, it ought to be called the Hospital of the old Decrepid Italian Operas,' and Burney was inclined to acquit Clayton of plagiarism in its composition, for 'nothing so mean in melody and incorrect in counterpoint was likely to have been produced by any of the reigning composers of that time.' It was sung by Richard Leveridge, Hughes, Ramondon, Good, Mrs. Lindsay, Mrs. Cross, and Mrs. Tofts, the last of whom made in it her first appearance on the stage. On 6 February 1705, it was played at St. James's Palace before Queen Anne, at the celebration of her birthday; according to Genest it was performed fifteen, or according to Burney twenty-four times in 1705, and thirteen times in 1706. The opera has been described as the first English opera in the Italian style.

Encouraged by this success, Clayton tried his hand at another opera, and on Tuesday, 4 March 1707, produced at Drury Lane a setting of Addison's Rosamond, in which Holcomb, Leveridge, Hughes, Mrs. Tofts, Mrs. Lindsay, and Maria Gallia sang the principal parts. This work was repeated on the 15th and 22nd of the same month, but its failure was so decided that it was never again performed. The anonymous author already quoted opines that 'Rosamond 'mounted the stage on purpose to frighten all England with its abominable musick.' Both Arsinoe and Rosamond were published, and posterity has thus been enabled to endorse the opinions of Clayton's contemporaries.

After the failure of 'Rosamond' the operatic venture continued until 1711. He was also the proprietor of a concert room at his house in the York Buildings of London (near The Strand), where he, Charles Dieupart, and Nicola Haym organized concert performances of his later works. They were advertised for subscription series in 1711 and 1712, but it is unclear how many of them were actually performed there. On 24 May 1711, settings by Clayton of a version of Dryden's Alexander's Feast (altered by John Hughes), and of Harrison's Passion of Sappho, were performed, but both works failed, after which nothing is heard of the luckless composer.

He is said to have died about 1730.

== Assessment ==
Clayton is of importance in the history of English music as the first to acclimatise legitimate opera in England, but as a composer his position is summed up in the words of his anonymous contemporary : 'If a reward was to be ordain'd for him that made the worst musick in all the world, the author of Rosamond wou'd have reason to say he had not lost his labour, since he wou'd have an undoubted title to the gratification.'

== Works ==
In addition to his 1710 cantatas with text by John Hughes, Clayton's works include:

- Arsinoe, Queen of Cyprus – opera in three acts, libretto by Peter Motteux after Tomaso Stanzani (premiered London, 1705)
- Rosamond – opera in three acts, libretto by Joseph Addison (premiered London, 1707)
- A Pastoral Mask (1710)
- If Wine and Music have the Power – text by Matthew Prior (London, 1711)
- The Feast of Alexander – libretto by John Hughes after John Dryden (London, 1711)
- The Passion of Sappho – text by William Harrison (London, 1711)
- Ode for the Prince's Birthday (London, 1711)
- Ode on the King (London, 1716)

== Notes and references ==
Attribution

This article incorporates text from a publication now in the public domain: Squire, William Barclay (1887). "Clayton, Thomas". In Stephen, Leslie (ed.). Dictionary of National Biography. Vol. 11. London: Smith, Elder & Co. pp. 20–21.

== Sources ==
- De Lafontaine, Henry Cart (1909). The King's Musick: A transcript of records relating to music and musicians (1460-1700). Novello and Company
- McGeary, Thomas (Spring 1998). "Thomas Clayton and the Introduction of Italian Opera to England". Philological Quarterly. 77 (2). Archived from the original on 23 July 2019 – via Questia.
- Sadie, Julie Anne (1998) "Clayton, Thomas", Companion to Baroque Music. University of California Press. ISBN 0-520-21414-5
