= Camilla (Bononcini) =

Opera

Camilla was an opera first performed at Drury Lane in London on 30 April 1706. The libretto was based on Il Trionfo di Camilla, regina de' Volsci by Silvio Stampiglia, translated into English verse by Owen Swiny, Peter Motteux, or others. Authorship of the music for the original is attributed variously to Giovanni Bononcini and to his brother Marc Antonio. Music for the London version was adapted by Nicola Haym. The opera was the first to be sung in a mixture of English and Italian, and it was one of the first London operas in which the castrato Nicolò Grimaldi (known as Nicolini) performed.

There were three separate productions of Camilla in London which together had 111 or 112 performances from 1706 to 1728, making it the most popular and successful work of its period, after The Beggar's Opera.

== Roles and plot ==
The story is based very loosely on the mythological figure of Camilla in Virgil's Aeneid. The characters are:

Camilla, heiress to the throne of the Volscians, disguised as Dorinda, a shepherdess (soprano); Prenesto, prince of Latium (soprano); Latinus, king of Latium (tenor); Lavinia, his daughter, (soprano); Turnus, king of the Rutuli, disguised as Armidoro, a Moorish slave (soprano); Metius, confidant of Camilla (tenor); Linco, servant of Camilla (bass); Tullia, Lavinia's maid (tenor); and a Hunter (tenor).

Act I: Camilla, disguised as a shepherdess, is hiding in the Volscian countryside and plans to overthrow the usurper King Latinus from the throne that is rightfully hers. A group of hunters arrives and one of their number, Prenesto, son of Latinus, is menaced by a boar. When Camilla shoots down the boar, he falls in love with her. Meanwhile, Lavinia, sister of Prenesto, is concealing her lover the enemy king Turnus in the palace, disguised as a slave. King Latinus presses her to find a husband. Prenesto gives Camilla access to Latinus's entourage where, allied with Metius, she plots to overthrow the king.

Act II: Amorous intrigues and political conspiracies continue. Before the statues of her ancestors, Camilla swears revenge against Latinus and turns to the people to stir up the struggle. Meanwhile, Turnus, observed by Latinus, brings Lavinia poison and a dagger, offering her a choice of deaths as a way out of her impasse. However, unable to kill her himself, he confesses his real identity to Latinus, offering his own life in exchange for hers. Moved by this appeal, Latinus accepts him as a son-in-law.

Act III: Latinus and Turnus ally themselves against Camilla, whose identity is meanwhile discovered by Lavinia's maid. Taken prisoner, she is freed by Prenesto, who continues to love her despite the hatred between their families. During a banquet a popular uprising is announced: Camilla and her allies defeat the troops of the Latin king. Love triumphs over political rivalry and marriage between Camilla and Prenesto ends the discord.

== Performance history ==
The adaptation by McSwiney and Haym cut as much of the recitative as possible from libretto, as this was an unfamiliar form in English and difficult to write as effectively as in Italian. While the first performances were entirely in English, some sections were turned back into Italian to accommodate foreign singers, so that the performances took place in a changing mix of two languages.

The original cast was: Holcomb (Prenesto), Hughs (Turnus), Lewis Ramondon (Metius), Richard Leveridge (Linco), Catherine Tofts (Camilla), Joanna Maria Lindelheim (Lavinia), and Mrs Lyndsey (Tullia).

From December 6, 1707 the cast changed and performances were staged in a mix of Italian and English. The role of Turnus was taken by Valentino Urbani (Valentini), of Lavinia by Joanna Maria Lindelheim, and of Prenesto by Margherita de l'Épine. The other roles were sung in English by Purbeck Turner (Latinus), Littleton Ramondon (Metius), Richard Leveridge (Linco), Catherine Tofts (Camilla) and Mary Lindsey (Tullia).

From February 7, a new castrato, Giuseppe Cassani, took over the role of Metius. He was extremely unpopular and audiences hissed him and did not appear after February 10. Ramondon replaced him, presumably in English, from February 21. On 25 January 1709 Nicolini Grimaldi (Nicolini) took over the role of Prenesto, and Catherine Tofts the role of Camilla.

There were nine performances in the first season, 21 the following season, and fourteen the one after. It was revived (with Bononcini's original score rather than Haym's adaptation) in 1717, 1719 and 1726–28. The opera was so popular that five editions of the libretto were published by Jacob Tonson in 1726 alone. It was performed at court for the birthday of Queen Anne in February 1707.

The original Italian opera by Stampiglia and Bononcini's premiered in Naples at the Teatro di S Bartolomeo on 27 December 1696. It went in to become the most successful work of its period; the libretto was used in 38 known productions before 1767. Bononcini's score was substantially used in 27 of these while there were 38 settings by other composers including Leo, Vinci (Parma 1725) and Porpora.
