= The Stage Coach =

1704 play

- Original language: English
- Written by: George Farquhar; Peter Motteux
- Genre: Restoration Comedy

Premiere
- Date: 2 February 1704
- Place: Lincoln's Inn Fields Theatre

The Stage Coach is a 1704 play by George Farquhar and Peter Motteux. A farce, it is based on the 1680 French play Les Carrosses d'Orléans by Jean de La Chapelle.

It was staged at the Lincoln's Inn Fields Theatre in London as an afterpiece to a revival of John Crowne's The Country Wit. The cast included Thomas Doggett as Nicodemus Somebody, Barton Booth as Captain Basil, George Pack as Fetch, John Freeman as Micher and Abigail Hunt as Dolly.

== Bibliography ==
- Richetti, John. The Cambridge History of English Literature, 1660-1780. Cambridge University Press, 2005.
