= Charles Dieupart =

French composer

Charles Dieupart (1676 – 1751) was a French harpsichordist, violinist, and composer. Although he was known as Charles to his contemporaries according to some biographers, his real name was actually François. He was born in Paris, rue aux Ours, August 10th, 1676. His father was Nicolas Dieupart (? - 1700) an ordinary musician to Louis XIV's Grande Ecurie. At some point, he befriended Elizabeth Wilmot of Rochester, countess of Sandwich, and Jacques Paisible who were visiting James II of England in his exile at Saint-germain-en-Laye near Paris. This is the main reason for his coming to London around 1700. A prominent member of the Drury Lane musical establishment, Dieupart was active both as composer and performer and actively participated in the musical life of the city. However, after about 1712 he earned his income mostly by teaching, and in his later years lived in poverty. He is best remembered today for a collection of six harpsichord suites which influenced Johann Sebastian Bach's English Suites.

== Life ==
Details of Dieupart's early life and training are sketchy. The earliest document to refer to the composer is a parisian tax roll dated 1695 where he is said to have mastered the harpsichord and other instruments. In 1701, he published his Six Suittes de clavessin, published in Amsterdam. He is next heard of on 11 February 1703 in London, when he performed Corelli's music at Drury Lane with Gasparo Visconti. Dieupart settled in London and eventually became an important member of the Drury Lane musical establishment. He collaborated with playwright Peter Anthony Motteux, composer Thomas Clayton, and others; he also participated in performances of music by Italian composers such as Giovanni Bononcini and Domenico Scarlatti.

In late 1707 Dieupart became involved in establishing an operatic project at the Queen's Theatre in the Haymarket, London. Although he evidently played a significant part in the project, he was dropped by the management after about a year, in late 1708. Dieupart tried organizing a series of concerts at York Buildings in 1711 and 1712, but ended up giving only a few. After 1712 he was mostly active as a teacher, although his music was still performed in concerts until at least 1726, and he was apparently a regular member of the Drury Lane orchestra. Dieupart's last known public appearance was in 1724. According to music historian John Hawkins, whose work is the most important source on Dieupart's biography, the composer died at a very advanced age and in poverty. This information has recently turned to be false, for archives documents show he married in Melun, near Paris, in 1744 and died at Saint-Germain-sur-Ecole, a small village nearby, in 1751.

== Music ==
Dieupart's best-known work is Six Suittes de clavessin (Amsterdam, 1701). As the title indicates, it contains six harpsichord suites. All of them are in seven movements, always with the sequence ouverture – allemande – courante – sarabande – gavotte, a menuet or a passepied, and a gigue as the final movement. Some of the movements within a suite are linked thematically. The music represents a highly successful synthesis of French, Italian and English styles, married with imaginative harmony. The same can be said about most of Dieupart's other music, which has been neglected in recent times. The suites were popular even during the composer's lifetime: they were reissued already in 1702, arranged for violin or recorder (voice flute and fourth flute) and basso continuo, and then 13 of the movements were published in London in 1705 as Select Lessons for the Harpsichord or Spinnett. Johann Sebastian Bach copied all six suites sometime between 1709 and 1714, and was influenced by Dieupart's music, particularly in the famous English Suites. Dieupart's suites may have also inspired Nicolas Siret, whose first book adopts the suite's initial opening as an example.

== List of works ==
- Six suittes de clavessin (A, D, b, e, F, f) (Amsterdam, 1701)
  - Instrumental arrangements published as Six suittes (Amsterdam, 1702)
  - Thirteen individual movements published as Select Lessons for the Harpsichord or Spinnett (London, 1705)
- Songs in the New Opera, Call'd Love's Triumph, The Symphonys or Instrumental Parts in the Opera Call'd Love's Triumph (London, 1708)
- The Overture and Chaconne belonging to [...] the Opera of Thomyris (London, 1708; published 2024, CMBV CAHIERS-344)
- Six Sonatas or Solos (G, a, e, B, g, F), for recorder and basso continuo (London, 1717)
- Sonata in D minor for oboe, strings and basso continuo
- Sonata (Ouverture) in E minor for strings
- Concerto in A minor for soprano recorder/flute/oboe, 2 oboes, bassoon, strings, and basso continuo
- Concerto in A major for violin, 2 oboes, bassoon, strings, and basso continuo
- Concerto in B♭ major for 2 violins, 2 oboes, bassoon, strings, and basso continuo
- Concerto in E minor for 2 flutes, 2 horns, strings, and basso continuo
- Concerto in B minor for trumpet, 2 oboes, strings, and basso continuo
- Miscellaneous keyboard pieces and 33 airs published in various collections
