= Arsinoe, Queen of Cyprus =

Opera by Thomas Clayton

Arsinoe, Queen of Cyprus by Thomas Clayton was the first Italian-style opera (in English) to be staged in England. It premiered at the Theatre Royal, Drury Lane on 16 January 1705. There were various historical women named Arsinoe, but from the mid seventeenth-century the name became popular for fictional characters who, like the title-role of this opera, bore no relation to any of them.

== Introduction of Italian opera to London ==
Clayton visited Italy and on his return staged a number of Italian singing and dancing interludes for the public at his house in York Buildings in 1703. Encouraged by the success of these ventures he decided to stage a full Italian-style opera in English.

The libretto was originally written for the theatre in Bologna by Tommaso Stanzani in 1667 and performed in Venice in 1668 with music by Petronio Franceschini. (Stanzani had in fact plagiarised from La regina Floridea, an opera staged in Milan). It was translated into English by Peter Anthony Motteux, who made a number of adaptations to suit the London stage, eliminating one character entirely to reduce the number of singers required to three female and three male. He also cut the spectacular first two scenes from Stanzani's version, as these required a male chorus, a ghost, and elaborate stage machinery that Drury Lane did not possess.

It is not certain whether Clayton adapted a collection of popular Italian songs to Motteux's libretto, or whether he composed the arias himself. In his introduction to the opera Clayton stated that he had written the work for the purpose of introducing Italian opera to London, and had had the libretto translated to this end. He drew attention to the recitative, an innovation in England, and hoped that audiences would come to approve of it. It was presented as “an opera, after the Italian manner: all sung.”

== First production ==
The production was lavish, with sets by James Thornhill. It was mostly funded by subscribers, who received tickets for the first three performances. The fourth performance was staged at court as part of Queen Anne’s fortieth birthday festivities with a special prologue written and pronounced by William Congreve. The continuo was provided by Charles Dieupart on the harpsichord and Nicola Haym on the cello.

The title role was performed by Catherine Tofts. Its success was indeed largely due to her: she had been trained in Italian-style singing, and Dieupart secured the role for her with Clayton. Her involvement was decisive in ensuring that Drury Lane agreed to run the opera. The male lead role (Ormondo) was sung by the countertenor Francis Hughes.

The opera ran for twenty-four nights in its first season, as well as eleven nights the following year. There were three further performances in 1707, but by that time Antonio Maria Bononcini’s Camilla had appeared on the stage, and the greatly superior musical experience it offered effectively finished Arsinoe.

== Critical reception and impact ==
The music from the opera was popular. Songs in the New Opera, Call’d Arsinoe Queen of Cyprus, Compos’d by Mr Tho. Clayton, containing sixteen songs, was published by I. Walsh in April 1706. A second issue contained three additional songs, and in addition to this thirteen of the opera’s songs were published separately. On 5 October 1706 Walsh advertised a new edition, including 37 songs and the overture under the title Songs in the Opera Call’d Arsinoe Queen of Cyprus.

Although the opera was successful in its time, it was derided as rubbish by later critics. One described how the opening verse began in recitative and then switched to a da capo aria which ended in the middle of a line. Another described it as ‘filled with antiquated Italian airs’ which made it resemble ‘the Hospital of the old Decrepit Italian Operas.’ Charles Burney said that it broke the rules of composition in every song, as well as “the prosody and accents of our language”.

Despite its shortcomings, the success of Arsinoe showed that the London public would go to see Italian-style operas in English. In April 1705 William Congreve and John Vanbrugh put in an opera sung in Italian, with Italian singers, Gli amori di Ergasto by Jakob Greber at the Queen's Theatre, Haymarket, but it was not popular. Only with the arrival of the first Italian castrato, Valentino Urbani, in London, in 1707, did the popularity of Italian opera really take off.
