= Richard Leveridge =

English singer and composer (1670–1758)

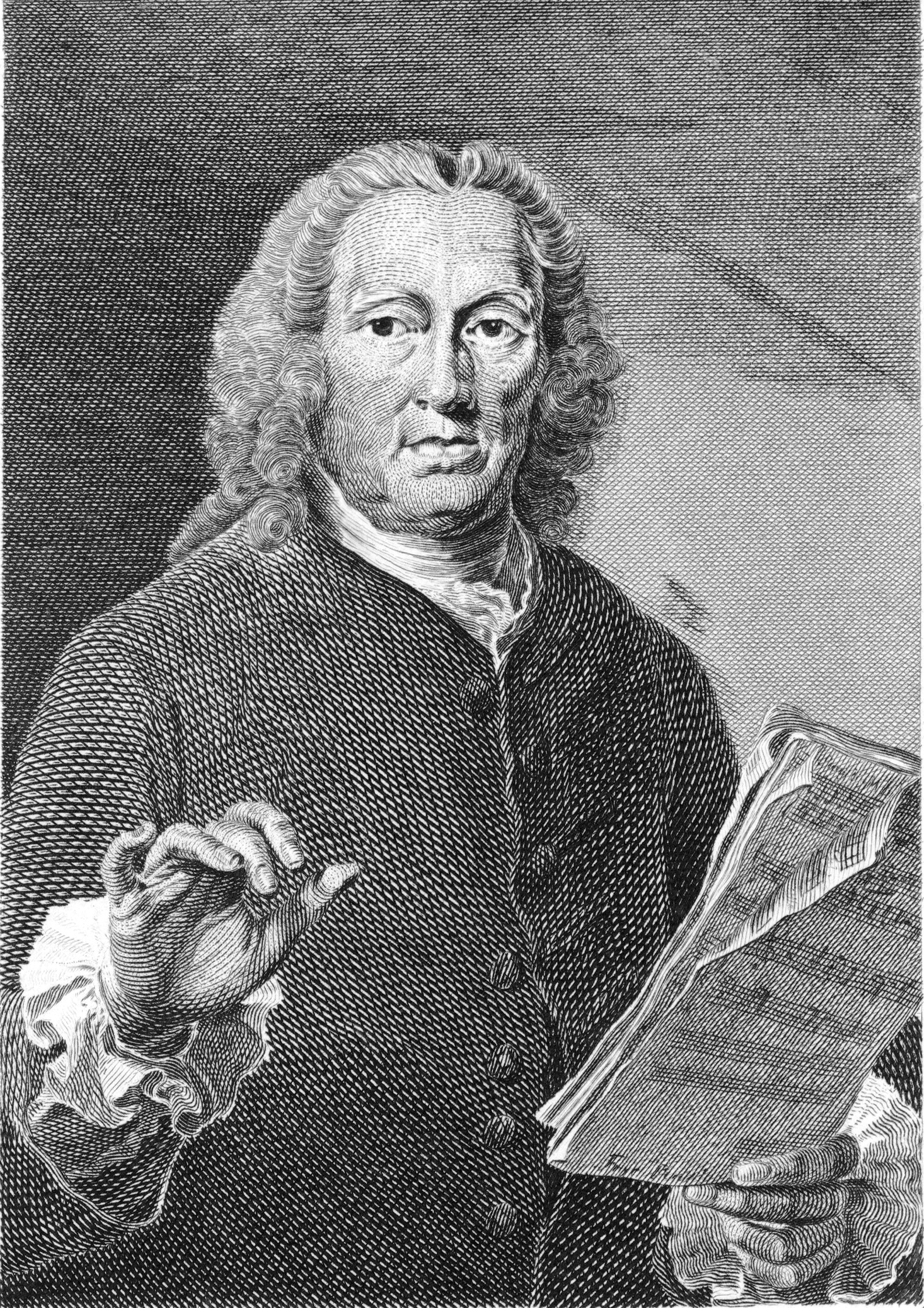
- Portrait of Richard Leveridge, Engraved by J. Saunders, After Thomas Frye (circa 1710–1762)

Background information
- Also known as: Richard Leueridge
- Born: 19 July 1670; St Martin-in-the-Fields, London, United Kingdom
- Died: 22 March 1758 (aged 87) Holborn, London, United Kingdom
- Genre: baroque music
- Occupations: Singer, composer
- Instrument: bass
- Years active: 1695–1753

Richard Leveridge (or Leueridge) (19 July 1670 – 22 March 1758) was an English bass singer of the London stage and a composer of baroque music, including many popular songs.

== Life ==
Richard Leveridge was born in the parish of St Martin-in-the-Fields, London, in 1670, and in 1695 became the leading bass singer in the United Company managed by Christopher Rich at Drury Lane, after the defection of several leading singers from Rich's company. His first important role of which anything is known was as the magician Ismeron in Henry Purcell's opera The Indian Queen, which included the aria "Ye twice ten hundred deities". Purcell himself remained loyal to the company, and for several months Leveridge worked closely with him. It is likely that "Arise, ye subterranean winds" in the music (attributed to Purcell) for The Tempest was written for him. After Purcell's death he continued to work with composers Daniel Purcell and Jeremiah Clarke, and took a leading part in Clarke's Ode upon the death of Mr Purcell at Drury Lane. Leveridge also composed, and in February 1699 all three provided music for Motteux's adaptation of Fletcher's The Island Princess, in which Leveridge's performance, particularly his 'Enthusiastick Song', engendered great enthusiasm among its hearers.

At various times between 1697 and 1728 Leveridge published volumes of his own songs, and numerous single items including his popular theatre songs appeared as separate printed sheets throughout his career. After a spell in Dublin he returned to London in 1702 for a revival of The Island Princess and a new production of Macbeth billed as "with music Vocal and Instrumental, all new Composed by Mr Leveridge". He sang the role of Hecate in this work for nearly 50 years, and the music remained popular for more than a century after his death.

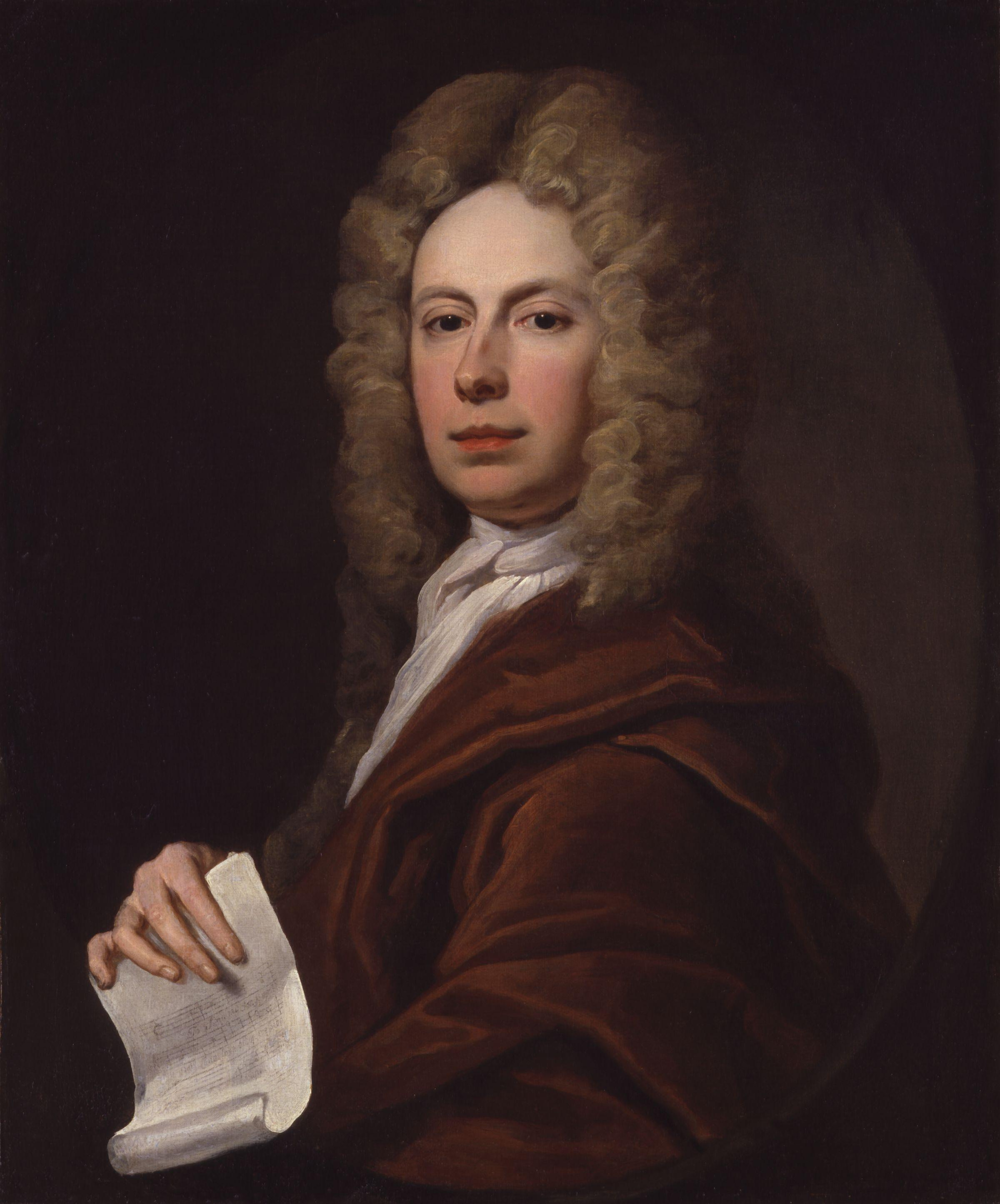
The youthful portrait of Rick Leveridge, c. 1710–1720

Leveridge continued to sing Purcell's operas and masques in the revivals, at Drury Lane in 1703–08, of The Fairy-Queen, Timon of Athens, Amphitrion, Libertine Destroyed, Tempest, King Arthur, Indian Queen, and Œdipus. He also participated in the introduction of opera in the Italian style from 1705, appearing in Arsinoë (1705), Camilla (1706), Rosamond (1707), Thomyris (1707), and Love's Triumph (1708). Some of these productions had mixed English and Italian singers (bilingual performances), but when the fashion became entirely Italian Leveridge was replaced in the bass roles by the Italian basso Giuseppe Maria Boschi. He then began a short association with Handel, in 1713 to 1714, and acted in the first performances of Il pastor fido and Teseo and played Argantes in a revival of Rinaldo. In this period he sang with Nicolini, who was in London from 1708 to 1712 and in the seasons of 1714–17. Later in his career, in 1731, he is known to have taken the role of Polypheme (who has the aria O ruddier than the cherry) in a performance of Acis and Galatea.

In 1714, he moved to work at the new theatre at Lincoln's Inn Fields, managed by entrepreneur John Rich. Remaining there for most of his career, he returned to his English repertoire and a new form, the musical Afterpiece. These lightweight works were often comic, and in 1716 Leveridge produced his own afterpiece, Pyramus and Thisbe. For this comic parody of Italian opera, he wrote the music, adapting the words from Shakespeare's A Midsummer Night's Dream, and sang the role of Pyramus. He was apparently absent from the stage around 1720–24, during which time he was occupied with the coffee house in Tavistock Street near Covent Garden, at the sign of 'The Harlequin and Pierot', which he held by lease from 1714 to 1736. However Rich drew him back, and Leveridge scored a success in 1726 in Apollo and Daphne with Silenus's song Tho' envious old age seems in part to impair me, composed by Johann Ernst Galliard. From that time forth he became the leading bass at Lincoln's Inn Fields and later transferred to Covent Garden.

His repertoire exploited his firm and powerful voice, and several of his songs became popular favourites. Although most renowned for his comic-patriotic ballad The Roast Beef of Old England, and above all for his setting of John Gay's lyric of Black Eyed Susan, others are lover's complaints or addresses, anacreontics, hunting songs (notably The sweet rosy morning peeps over the hills), fairy songs, dramatic pieces, and the like, to the number of more than 150. In addition to A New Book of Songs 1697 and A Second Book of Songs 1699, and A New Book of Songs 1711, further volumes were printed in 1727 (with a frontispiece by William Hogarth), and 1728. A number of the 1727 songs are settings of words by Abraham Cowley. Some songs written no doubt for his own performance contain roulades and word-painting, giving an impression of his vocal range and flexibility, and some have recitatives or short sections of part-writing, introducing dramatic structure into the context of concise set-pieces.

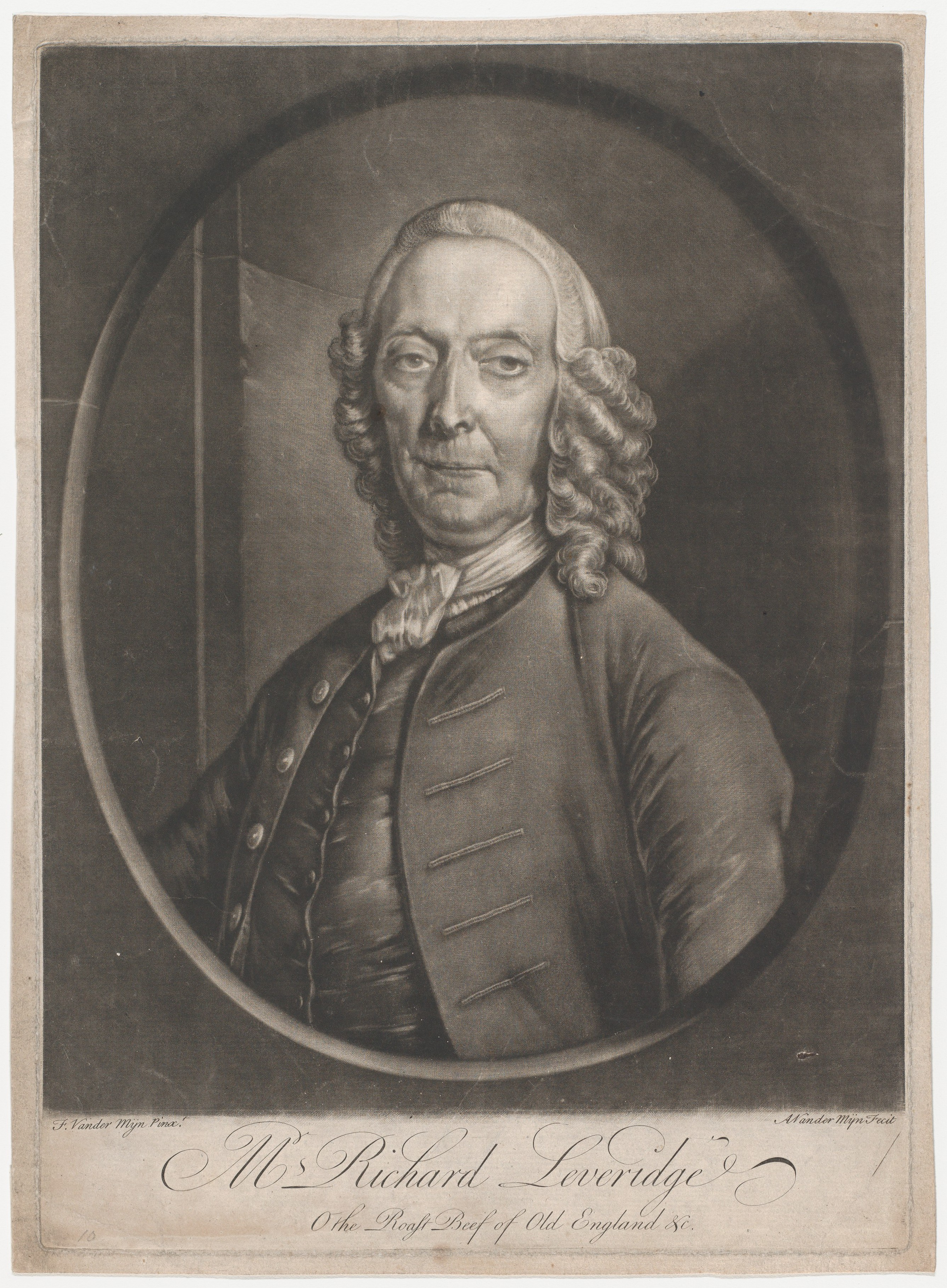
Leveridge in old age, by Frans van der Mijn

Leveridge enjoyed good health and reduced his performances only in the last few seasons before retiring in 1751. He died aged 87 at his lodgings in High Holborn, London, in 1758.

== Descriptions ==
Sir John Hawkins (1776) remarked, "Though he had been a performer in the opera at the same time with Nicolino and Valentini" (possibly meaning Roberto Valentini) "he had no notion of grace or elegance in singing; it was all strength and compass..." Hawkins's opinion of Leveridge was coloured by social perceptions: "Being a man of rather coarse manners, and able to drink a great deal, he was by some thought a good companion. The humour of his songs, and indeed of his conversation, consisted in exhortations to despise riches and the means of attaining them; to drown care by drinking; to enjoy the present hour, and to set reflection and death at defiance. With such a disposition as this, Leveridge could not fail to be a welcome visitor at all clubs and assemblies, where the avowed purpose of meeting was an oblivion of care; and being ever ready to contribute to the promotion of social mirth, he made himself many friends, from whose bounty he derived all the comforts that in an extreme old age he was capable of enjoying."

In 1789 Charles Burney wrote of him: "I remember his singing Ghosts of every occupation, and several of Purcell's base songs, occasionally, in a style which forty years ago seemed antediluvian: but as he generally was the representative of Pluto, Neptune, or some ancient divinity, it corresponded perfectly with his figure and character. He was not only a celebrated singer of convivial songs, but the writer and composer of many that were in great favour with singers and hearers of a certain class, who more piously performed the rites of Comus and Bacchus, than those of Minerva and Apollo."

== Portraits ==
The Roast Beef of Old England
Henry Fielding wrote "The Roast Beef of England", which is used by both the Royal Navy and the United States Marine Corps, in 1731. Leveridge later arranged it. This version is performed by the United States Navy Band.

The National Portrait Gallery, London has an oil portrait of the young Richard Leveridge, c. 1710–20, by an unknown artist, which is on display at the Handel House Museum, London. It also has copies of two other likenesses, one a mezzotint by William Pether after the oil portrait by Thomas Frye, and the other a mezzotint by Andreas van der Mijn after the portrait by Frans van der Mijn. Both show Leveridge in advanced old age. There are more versions than one of the original oil portrait by Thomas Frye, including that in the collections of Warwick Town council, and the better-known example in the Gerald Coke Handel Collection at the Foundling Museum.

== Recorded works ==
Recordings of works by Richard Leveridge include the songs "Black and gloomy as the grave", "When daisies pied and violets blue", and "The Roast Beef of Old England".
