= Margherita de L'Épine =

Italian opera singer

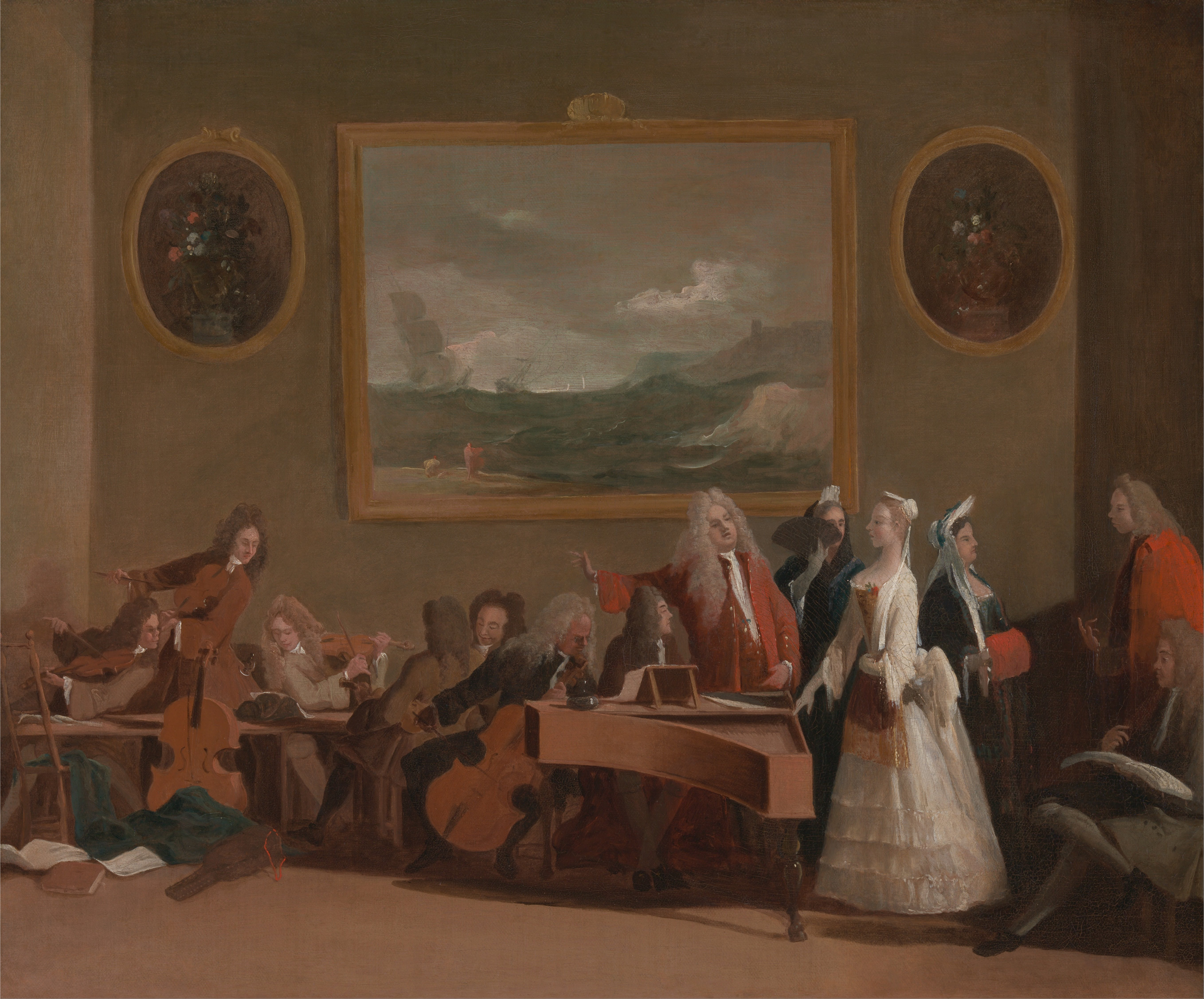
Margherita de l'Épine (with a red muff), Catherine Tofts (in white), and some opera musicians (Rehearsal of an opera, by Marco Ricci, ca. 1709).

Margherita de L'Épine (also Francesca Margherita de l'Épine; c. 1680 – 8 August 1746, London) was an Italian soprano of the Baroque era. She was among the most popular and successful of London's female singers in the years just before and after Italian opera became introduced to the city. Today, she is best remembered for her performances in the operas of George Frideric Handel, and her longstanding association with the composer Johann Pepusch, whom it seems she married around 1718.

== Life ==
After performing at Venice between 1698 and 1700, de L'Epine arriving in London in possibly 1702 but for certain the following year as in May 1703, she received twenty guineas "for one day's singing in ye play called ye Fickle Sheperdesse;" while her appearance at Lincoln's-Inn-Fields Theatre (where she was to sing "four of her most celebrated Italian songs") on 1 June 1703, though announced to be her last, was followed by another on 8 June, when a song called "The Nightingale" was added to her répertoire.

She had a relationship with Jakob Greber, although rumours of an affair (1703) with Daniel Finch, the Earl of Nottingham may just be based on Finch paying for her to visit his estate, although he also paid for her subscription.

She danced as well as sang, performing at Drury Lane from 1704 to 1708, and then at the Queen's Theatre from 1708 to 1714. Her repertoire initially consisted of songs and cantatas by such diverse composers as Henry Purcell and Alessandro Scarlatti, but from 1706 she starred in such Italian operas as began to appear on London stages at this time, the most popular being Giovanni Bononcini's Camilla, in which she replaced Catherine Tofts at the fourth performance, singing the role of the heroine.

Her great success induced her to remain in London, and thus she became associated with the establishment of Italian opera in England. She first appeared at Drury Lane Theatre, 29 January 1704, singing some of Greber's music between the acts of the play. Thenceforth she frequently performed not only at that theatre but at the Haymarket and Lincoln's Inn-Fields. She sang before and after the opera Arsinoe, in 1705; she similarly took part in Greber's Temple of Love, 1706, where, according to Burney, she was the principal singer; in Thomyris, Queen of Scythia, 1707, an opera partly arranged from Scarlatti and Buononcini, by Dr. Pepusch; Camilla, where she played Prenesto, 1707; Pyrrhus and Demetrius, as Marius, 1709; Almahide, the first opera performed here wholly in Italian, 1710; Hydaspes, 1710; Calypso and Telemachus, 1712 (as Calypso); Handel's Pastor Fido (as Eurilla), and Rinaldo, 1712; Teseo, 1713; and the pasticcios Ernelinda and Dorinda, 1713. Her services were often engaged for the English operas at Lincoln's Inn-Fields, until 1718, when she married Dr. Pepusch and retired from the stage.

According to Downes, Margherita brought her husband at least 10,000 guineas. These "costly canary birds", as Cibber called the Italians, increased their income (8 pounds. a week was a singer's salary) by performances at private houses and other special engagements. Margherita's singing must have possessed great merit and cleverness, and was said to be superior to anything heard in England at the time. She had been joined in 1703 by her sister Maria Manina, who, however, did not become equally popular, and her only important rival was Mrs. Tofts, an established favourite at Drury Lane.

On the second appearance of "the Italian gentlewoman" upon these boards, early in 1704, a disturbance arose in the theatre. Mrs. Tofts's servant was implicated, and Mrs. Tofts felt it incumbent upon her to write to the manager to deny having had any share in the incident. The jealousy between the two singers, whether real or imagined, now became the talk of the town and the theme of the poetasters. The fashionable world was divided into Italian and English parties. Hughes wrote:

Music hath learn'd the discords of the state,
And concerts jar with whig and tory hate.
Here Somerset and Devonshire attend
The British Tofts, and ev'ry note commend;
To native merit just, and pleas'd to see
We 'ave Roman arts, from Roman bondage free.
There fam'd L'Épine does equal skill employ
While list'ning peers crowd to th' estatic joy;
Bedford to hear her song his dice forsakes;
And Nottingham is raptured when she shakes;
Lull'd statesmen melt away their drowsy cares
Of England's safety, in Italian airs.

Rowe, and others, wrote less pleasantly of "Greber's Peg" or "The Tawny Tuscan", and her conquests. Posterity has, notwithstanding, judged her character to be one of guileless good nature. The patience with which she endured the name "Hecate", bestowed upon her in consideration of her ugliness by her husband, has been recorded by Burney.

Dr. and Mrs. Pepusch lived for some time at Boswell Court, Carey Street, where a singing parrot adorned the window. In 1730 they moved to a house in Fetter Lane. Margherita, advancing in years, "retained her hand on the harpsichord, and was in truth a fine performer," so much so that amateurs would assemble to hear her play Dr. Bull's difficult lessons out of Queen Elizabeth's Virginal Book. It appears from a manuscript diary of S. Cooke, a pupil of Dr. Pepusch, that Mrs. Pepusch fell ill on 19 July 1746, and that on 10 August following, "in the afternoon, he went to Vauxhall with the doctor, Madame Pepusch being dead." She had been "extremely sick" the day before.

A replica in oils of Sebastian Ricci's picture A Rehearsal at the Opera, containing a portrait of Margherita, is in the possession of Messrs. John Broadwood & Sons, the pianoforte-makers. In this group of musicians "Margaritta in black with a muff" (as the title runs) is short, dark-complexioned, but not ill-favoured. The original painting is at Castle Howard, the seat of the Earl of Carlisle in Yorkshire.

== Sources ==
- Winton Dean: "de l'Epine, Margherita", Grove Music Online ed L. Macy (Accessed 9 March 2011), grovemusic.com, subscription access.
- Richard Leppert (1986). "Imagery, Musical Confrontation and Cultural Difference in Early 18th-Century London". Early Music. 14 (3). Oxford University press: 323–345. doi:10.1093/earlyj/14.3.323. JSTOR 3127106.
- Judith Milhous and Robert D. Hume (1983). "New Light on Handel and Royal Academy of Music in 1720". Theatre Journal. 35 (2). Johns Hopkins University Press: 149–167. JSTOR 3207146.
- Judith Milhous and Robert D. Hume (1993). "Opera Salaries in Eighteenth-Century London". Journal of the American Musicological Society. 46 (1). University of California Press: 26–83. doi:10.1525/jams.1993.46.1.03a00020. JSTOR 831805.
