= Peter Anthony Motteux =

English author, playwright, and translator (1663–1718)

- Born: Pierre Antoine Motteux; 25 February 1663; Rouen, France
- Died: 18 February 1718 (aged 54); London, England
- Citizenship: British
- Occupations: Editor, journalist, translator, playwright

Peter Anthony Motteux (born Pierre Antoine Motteux French: [mɔtø]; 25 February 1663 – 18 February 1718) was a French-born English author, playwright, and translator. Motteux was a significant figure in the evolution of English journalism in his era, as the publisher and editor of The Gentleman's Journal, "the first English magazine," from 1692 to 1694.

== Life ==
A native of Rouen, he was a French Huguenot who came to England in 1685 after the revocation of the Edict of Nantes. At first he lived with his godfather, Paul Dominique, and made his living as an auctioneer; by 1706 he maintained a shop in Leadenhall Street, selling imports from China, Japan, and India, and (in his own words) "silks, lace, linens, pictures, and other goods." He also held a position with the Post Office in the first decade of the 18th century.

His death in a bawdy house was thought to be suspicious, and caused a good deal of legal disturbance. Five people were tried for his murder, but were acquitted. His death was ultimately ruled an accident by erotic asphyxiation. He was survived by his widow Priscilla, two sons and a daughter.

== Translations ==
Motteux is perhaps best known for completing Sir Thomas Urquhart's translation of Rabelais' Gargantua and Pantagruel. Books I and II of Urquhart's translation of Rabelais had been published in 1653; Motteux (with outside help) revised these, completed Urquart's translation of Book III, and translated Book IV and the possibly-spurious Book V. The entire work was published in 1693 and 1694 (reprinted in 1708; revised by John Ozell in 1737).

While Urquhart's original version of Rabelais has sometimes been acclaimed as a masterpiece in itself, critics have had reservations about Motteux's continuation. In part, Motteux suffered for frankly rendering the vulgarity of Rabelais, to a generation of readers less prepared to tolerate it than Urquhart's had been.

Motteux produced an important translation of the Miguel de Cervantes novel Don Quixote; this 4-volume 1700–03 edition (3rd edition in 1712) was credited as "translated from the original by many hands and published by Peter Motteux." Very popular in its own era, Motteux's version of the work has been condemned by later translators. John Ormsby listed numerous faults he found with Motteux's translation, and described it as "worse than worthless ... worthless as failing to represent, worse than worthless as misrepresenting" the spirit and flavour of the original.

Motteux translated other works as well, one example being The Present State of the Empire of Morocco (1695) by French diplomat François Pidou de Saint-Olon.

== Dramas ==
Motteux wrote a series of plays and musical librettos that were produced during the 1690s and early 18th century, including:

- The Loves of Mars and Venus (1695)
- Love's a Jest (1696)
- She Ventures and He Wins (1696)
- The Novelty, or Every Act a Play (1697)
- Beauty in Distress (1698)
- Britain's Happiness (1704)
- The Stage Coach (1704)
- The Amorous Miser, or the Younger the Wiser (1705)
- Thomyris, Queen of Scythia (1707)
- Love's Triumph (1708)

—among others. As its subtitle indicates, The Novelty was an anthology of five short plays in different genres, comedy, tragedy, pastoral, masque, and farce.

Motteux worked in the English stage genre then called "opera," which were semi-operas somewhat comparable to modern musicals; works like The Rape of Europa by Jupiter (1694), Acis and Galatea (1701), and Arsinoe, Queen of Cyprus (1705), Thomyris, Queen of Scythia (17078 the first two with music by John Eccles, the third with music by Thomas Clayton and the fourth arranged by Johann Christoph Pepusch. His final works are translations and adaptations of opera libretti from the Italian.

As was typical of Restoration drama, Motteux's plays often adapted earlier works; and his plays in turn were adapted by others into new forms. His semi-opera The Island Princess, or the Generous Portuguese (1699) was an adaptation of John Fletcher's play The Island Princess, with music by Daniel Purcell, Richard Leveridge and Jeremiah Clarke. The mezzo-soprano, Mrs Lindsey sang interludes at its first performance at Drury Lane in February 1699.

After his death, the comic subplot of Acis and Galatea was transformed into "a comic mask" called Roger and Joan, or the Country Wedding (1739). Much later, David Garrick adapted The Novelty into a farce titled The Lying Varlet, published in 1823.

== Journalism ==
Motteux edited The Gentleman's Journal, or the Monthly Miscellany from its initial issue, dated January 1692, to its last of November 1694; evidence suggests he wrote most of the prose in each issue as well. (The plan was for monthly issues, though some were late, and some were missed.) Motteux may have been influenced by Le Mercure Galant, a French periodical of the 1670s devoted to Court news and gossip—though Motteux's Journal was more ambitious. The Journal published "News, History, Philosophy, Poetry, Musick, Translations, &c." It covered a wider range of topics than other periodicals of its era like John Dunton's The Athenian Gazette, giving it some claim as the first "general interest" magazine in English. Motteux reviewed plays by John Dryden (a personal friend) and William Congreve among others; he published verse by the poets of the era, including Matthew Prior and Charles Sedley; he covered the musical career of Henry Purcell and printed several of his songs. The short fictions published in the journal contributed to the formation of the novel in English; they are now available in a modern edition. The Journal even featured a "Lovers' Gazette," foreshadowing the advice-to-the-lovelorn columns of later generations of popular journalism.

Though its existence was relatively brief in historical terms, the Journal provided a precedent for later publications of the same type, notably The Gentleman's Magazine and The London Magazine. One curiosity of the Journal is that the title page of its first issue bore the motto E pluribus unum, apparently the earliest use of what would later become the motto of the United States of America. Motteux used the phrase in the sense of "one chosen among many," rather than its common later connotation. (Classicists have attempted to trace possible sources for the motto, ranging from Vergil to Aristotle to Horace to Cicero to St. Augustine.)

Motteux published early arguments in favor of the equality of the sexes; he re-titled the October 1693 issue of the Journal "The Lady's Journal," and devoted it to articles by and about women.
