= Catherine Tofts =

English singer (c. 1685 – c. 1756)

- Born: 1685; England
- Died: 1756 (aged 70–71)
- Other name: Katherine Tofts
- Occupation: Singer
- Years active: 1703–1709
- Employer: Theatre Royal, Drury Lane
- Style: Italian opera

Catherine Tofts or Katherine Tofts (c. 1685 – c. 1756) was the first English singer who sang Italian opera in England.

== Life ==
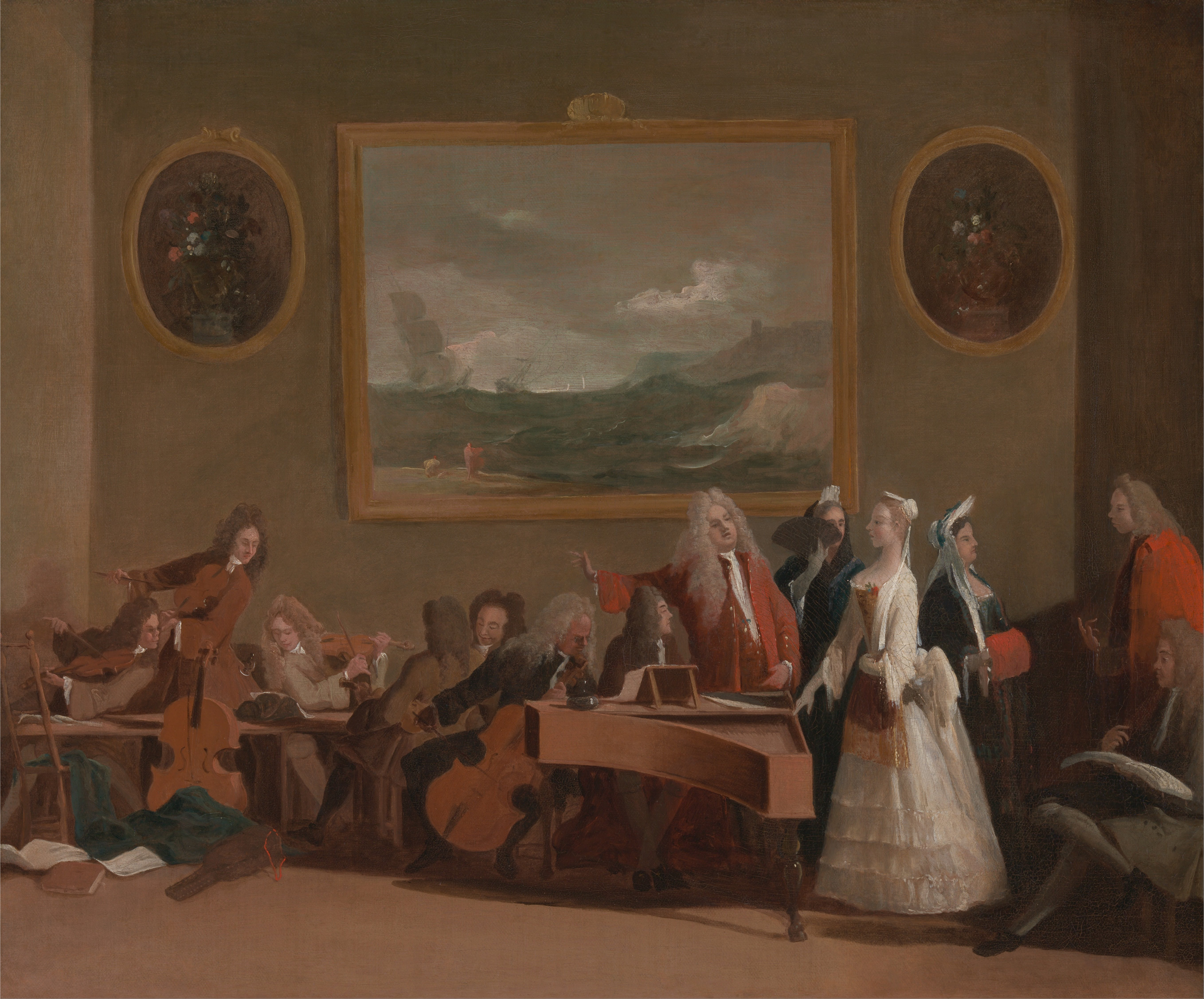
Catherine Tofts (in white), Margherita de L'Épine (with a red muff) and some opera musicians (Rehearsal of an opera by Marco Ricci, c. 1709)

Tofts began her career as a concert soprano in 1703 and joined the roster of principal sopranos at the Theatre Royal, Drury Lane in 1704. Around this time, the competition between Tofts and Margherita de L'Épine was in earnest. Perhaps to illustrate the famed rivalry, Marco Ricci painted L'Épine with her back to Tofts, in the composition Rehearsal of an opera (c. 1709) .

Jonathan Swift wrote a short poem about Tofts in his "works", which talks of her beauty. It is thought however that the verse was written by Alexander Pope.

Tofts quit the stage in 1709 and married Joseph Smith, English consul at Venice. They had a son who died when still a child, and subsequently, Catherine became mentally ill. A small oval portrait identified as of Joseph Smith and Catherine Tofts, and attributed to Rosalba Carriera, was exhibited at BRAFA Art Fair, Brussels 2026 by Stéphane Renard Fine Arts (tempera on ivory, 8.5 x 11.5 cm).

Catherine died in 1756 and her husband married again the following year.
