= Hydaspes (Mancini) =

1710 opera by Francesco Mancini

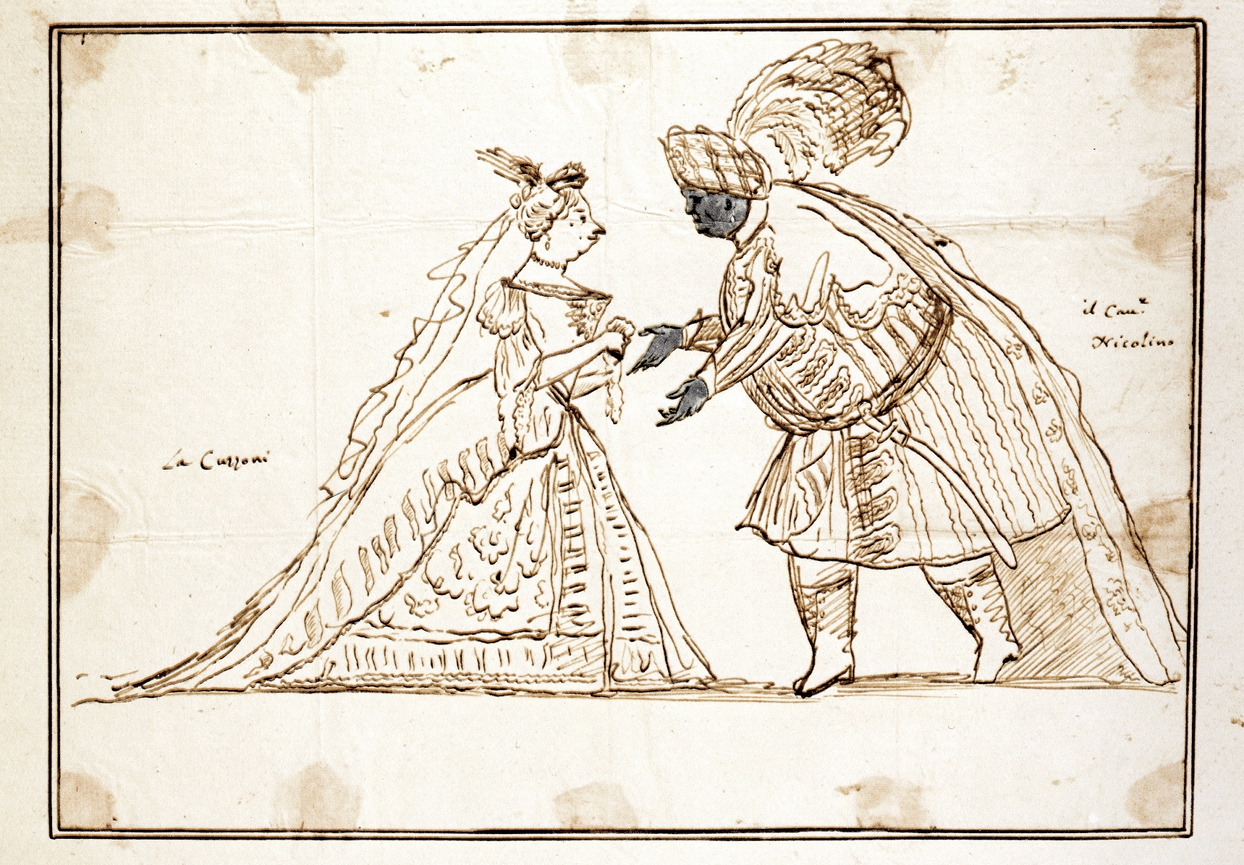
Nicolò Grimaldi (Nicolini) in the role of Idaspe opposite Francesca Cuzzoni in a 1730 production in Venice

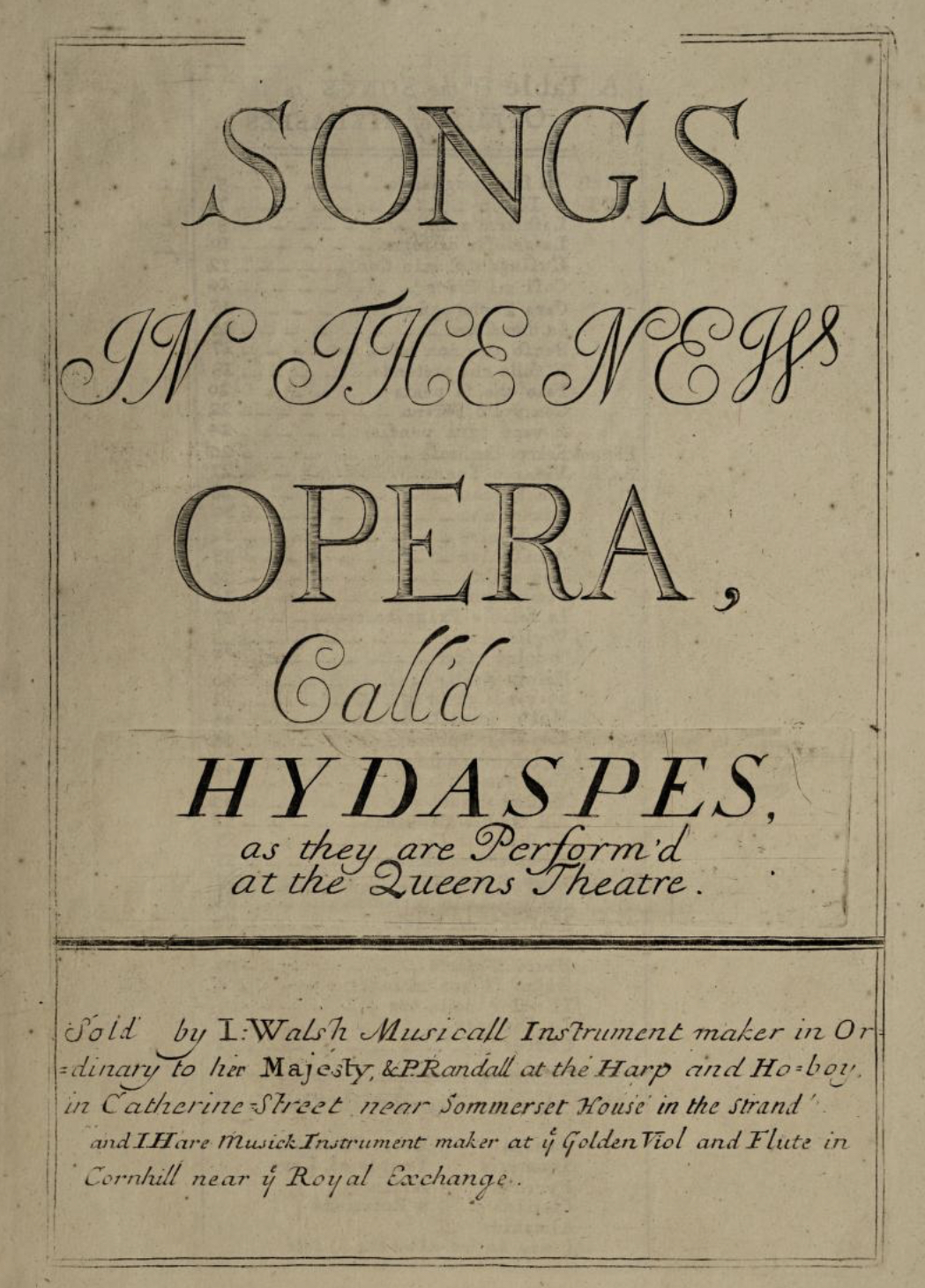
Title page of Songs In The New Opera Call'd Hydaspes, 1710

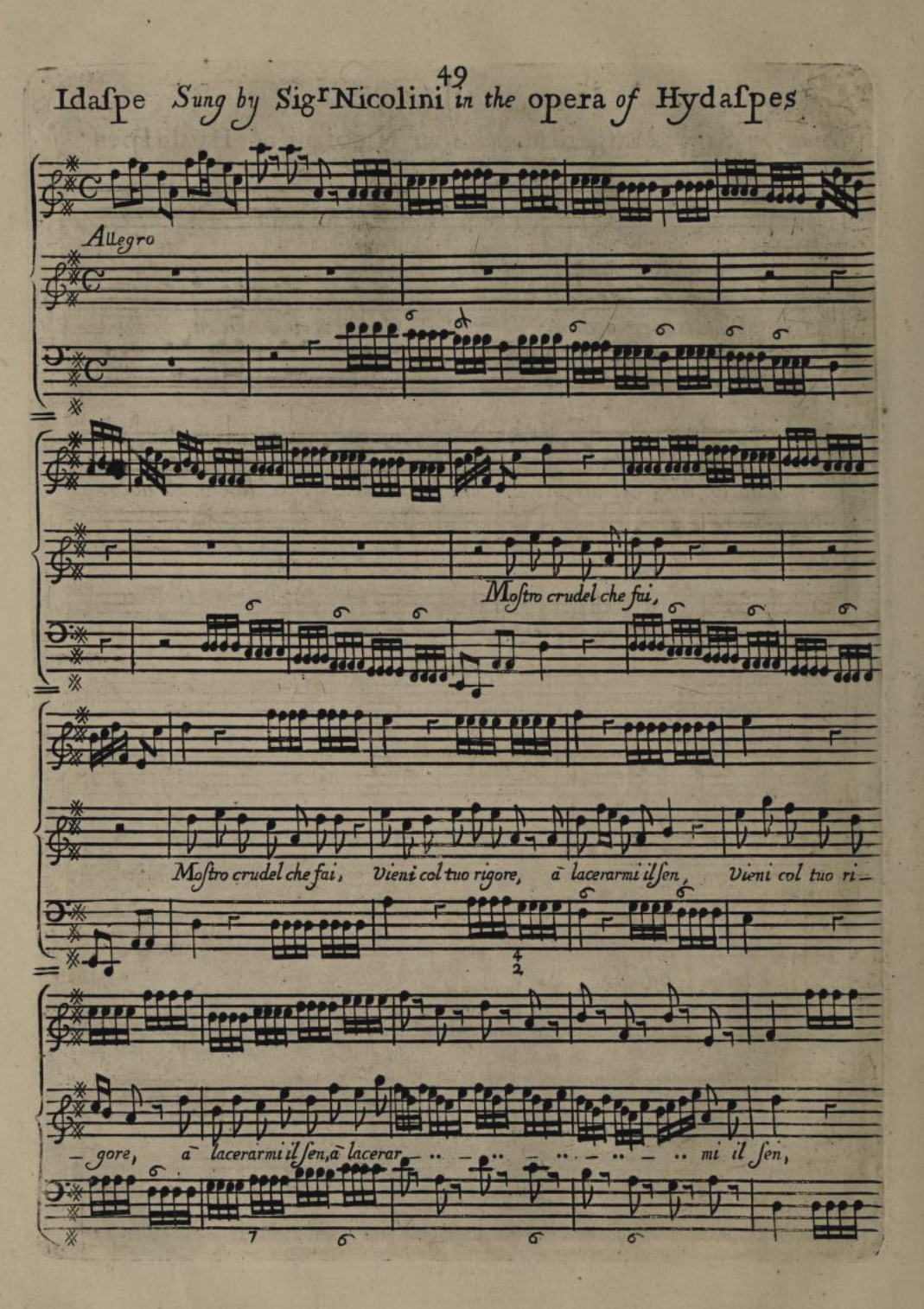
Aria from Songs In The New Opera Call'd Hydaspes, 1710

Hydaspes (also L'Idaspe fedele) is an opera by Francesco Mancini with a libretto by Giovanni Pietro Candi. It was first performed at the King's Theater in the Haymarket, London, on 23 March 1710. It was the second opera in England to be sung entirely in Italian, after Almahide, and was an early London success for the famous castrato Nicolò Grimaldi in the title role.

== Development ==
The original libretto by Giovanni Pietro Candi and Giulio Convò was revised by Silvio Stampiglia and staged at the teatro San Bartolomeo in Naples in 1705, with the title Gli amanti generosi. Nicolò Grimaldi brought the score with him when he came to London, and had considerable say over how the music was selected and adapted for a new London version. This work was undertaken by Johann Christoph Pepusch and the modified work was given the title Idaspe fedele. Among the material introduced by Pepusch were two arias borrowed from Giovanni Bononcini's Regina creduta re.

While Almahide (1710) is generally described as the first Italian opera in England, it had comic intermezzi in English between the acts. By not having these interludes, Idaspe fedele offered the first Italian-only opera experience to London audiences. This development came about as a result of an increasing taste for Italian-style opera seria, with no comic scenes at all.

The same libretto used in the London version of Idaspe was employed by Riccardo Broschi for his 1730 work Idaspe at the Teatro S Giovanni Grisostomo that starred Farinelli.

== Roles and plot ==
- Artaserse, king of Persia
- Dario, brother of Artaserse
- Idaspe, nephew of Artaserse, disguised as Acrone
- Arbace, captain of the guard
- Mandane, daughter of the king of Media
- Berenice, a Persian princess

Idaspe and his brother Artaserse are rivals for the affections of Berenice. The king condemns Idaspe to fight a lion in the amphitheatre with Berenice watching. Idaspe strangles the lion and the people demand mercy for him, leading to a general reconciliation.

== Performance history ==
The first season saw performances on 23 and 30 March, 1, 15, 18, 21 and 28 April, and 2, 5, 12, 23, 30 May 1710. The original cast was Nicolò Grimaldi (Idaspe), Giovanni Cassani (Artaserse), Valentino Urbani (Dario), Lawrence (Arbace), Isabella Girardeau (Mandane) and Margherita de L'Épine (Berenice). The sets were designed by the Venetian Marco Ricci. The orchestra during the first season was composed of a mix of English and foreign players, mostly Italian and French.

Performances were held in the second season on 22, 25 and 29 November, 2, 20, 27 and 30 December 1710, followed by 7, 10 and 17 February, 4 and 7 April and 30 May 1711. Elisabetta Pilotti-Schiavonetti replaced Margherita de L'Épine (Berenice) and Giuseppe Maria Boschi made his English debut replacing Cassani (Artaxerxes). The other cast members were Urbani (Dario), Grimaldi (Idaspe), Lawrence (Arbaces) and Girardeau (Mandane). The opera was revived at the Haymarket in 1712 and again on 27 August 1715 in a revised version. Altogether there were 46 performances of Idaspe between 1710 and 1716.

At the end of May 1710 Walsh, Randall, and Hare published Songs in the new Opera, Call'd Hydaspes, consisting of the overture and 40 arias. In January 1711 they published new arias written for Boschi in The Additionall Songs in the new Opera, Call'd Hydaspes.

== Critical reception ==
The scene in which Idaspe (dressed in a flesh-coloured costume to simulate nakedness) strangles a lion caused a sensation and ensured that the opera achieved a tremendous box office success, despite the unusually high price of the tickets. Nevertheless it was also the focus of criticism and satirical comment. In The Spectator (no. 13) Addison ridiculed it, and concluded that "audiences have often been reproached by writers for the coarseness of their taste, but our present grievance does not seem to be the want of a good taste, but of common sense."

The historian of opera Sutherland Edwards commented 'after appealing to the monster in a minor key, and telling him that he may tear his bosom, but cannot touch his heart, he attacks him in the relative major, and strangles him.' He suggests that "the ridiculous opera of Hydaspes could only have succeeded, despite its absurdities, because of the outstanding singing of Nicolini.

"Hydaspes with much vocal effort begs the lion to 'come on'. The lion... accepts the challenge and there is a struggle, Hydaspes and the lion pausing in the combat while Hydaspes declares his love for Berenice and explains matters generally in florid Italian singing. Hydaspes strangles the lion and... asks if any other monster is available."

== Harlequin Hydaspes ==
In 1719 a burlesque English-language parody of the opera, called Harlequin Hydaspes had a single performance on 27 May at Lincoln's Inn Fields. The work was written by Isabella Aubert, who had sung the role of Mandane in the 1715 production of Idaspe. In Harlequin Hydaspes Aubert herself took the role of harlequin (based on Idaspe). Christopher Bullock played 'the doctor' (Artaserse).

Much of the music from Idaspe was reused in Harlequin Hydaspes, together with arias from Alessandro Scarlatti's Pyrrhus and Demetrius, Almahide, Handel's Rinaldo and Amadigi and the pasticcio Clearte.(1716).
