= Isabella Girardeau =

Italian operatic soprano

Isabella Girardeau (née Calliari?; ? – ?) was an Italian operatic soprano who flourished in London, England from 1709 to 1712. Commonly referred to by the opera going public in London as "La Isabella", she is best remembered today for creating the role of Almirena in the momentous premiere of George Frideric Handel's Rinaldo on 24 February 1711 at the Queen's Theatre in the Haymarket (it later became the "King's Theatre" after King George I's accession in 1714) in which she introduced the famous aria "Lascia ch'io pianga". She had succeeded Joanna Maria Lindelheim, "The Baroness", as one of the leading sopranos at that theatre. She is said to have had a bitter rivalry with the Queen's other prima donna, the soprano Elisabetta Pilotti-Schiavonetti.

== Life and career ==
Very little is known about Girardeau's life. Her place and date of birth and activities prior to December 1709 are unknown. Though often styled 'Mademoiselle', the 18th-century music historian Charles Burney wrote that she was an Italian married to a Frenchman. Burney tentatively connected her to soprano Isabella Calliari from musicologist Francesco Saverio Quadrio's list of singers who were active during the first two decades of the 18th century.

Girardeau most likely arrived in England from either France or Italy in late 1709. A contract with the players at the Queen's Theatre dated 24 December 1709 (in which the performers agreed not to work for other theatres without permission) lists "Mad Girardo" as one of the theatre's personnel. Girardeau made her stage debut in London as Celinda in the world premiere of Giovanni Bononcini's Almahide on 10 January 1710; a pastiche of Bononcini's works which had been arranged by Johann Jakob Heidegger. Her only other known stage appearance that year was on 23 March as Mandana in Francesco Mancini's La Isabella. In either late 1710 or early 1711 she sang in a concert given in the apartments of the Duchess of Shrewsbury at Kensington Palace.

In 1711 Girardeau was seen at the Queen's Theatre as Climene in Alessandro Scarlatti's Pirro e Demetrio, Fronima in Bononcini's Etearco, and Almirena in the momentous premiere of George Frideric Handel's Rinaldo. Rinaldo was Handel's first opera written for the London stage, and it was the first Italian language opera written specifically for the English theatre. A tremendous success with the public, a further 12 performances were immediately scheduled after its premiere; at the end of the run, popular demand was such that two more were added. In 1712 she made her last known stage appearances as Oronte in Francesco Gasparini's Antioco and Veremonda in Gasparini's Ambleto. Her whereabouts and activities beyond 1712 are unknown.

== Sources ==
- Burney, Charles (1776–1789). F. Mercer (ed.). A General History of Music from the Earliest Ages to the Present Period. Cambridge University Press (published 2010).
- Dean, Winton; Knapp, J Merrill (1995). Handel's operas: 1704–1726. Oxford: Oxford University Press. ISBN 0-19-816441-6. Originally published in 1987
- Dean, Winton: "Isabella Girardeau", in The New Grove Dictionary of Music and Musicians, ed. Stanley Sadie. London, Macmillan Publishers Ltd., 2001.
- Grano, John Baptist (1998). Handel's trumpeter: the diary of John Grano. Hillsdale, New York: Pendragon Press.
- Highfill, Philip H.; Burnim, Kalman A.; Langhans, Edward A. (1973). A Biographical Dictionary of Actors, Actresses, Musicians, Dancers, Managers, and Other Stage Personnel in London, 1660-1800. Vol. 10. Carbondale, Illinois: Southern Illinois University Press.
