= Amadigi di Gaula =

1715 opera by Handel

- Opera by George Frideric Handel
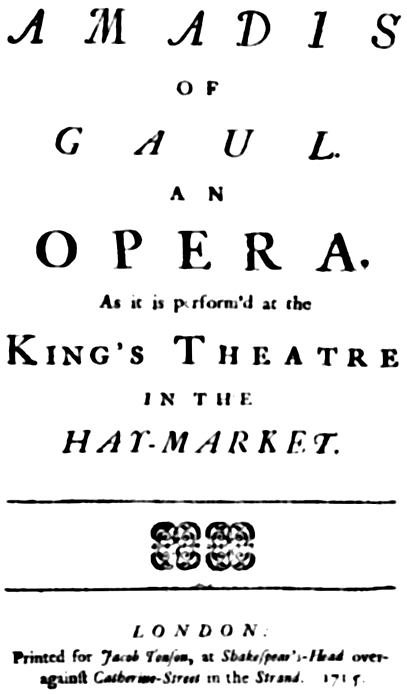
- Title page of the libretto for the premiere
- Librettist: (debated)
- Language: Italian
- Based on: Amadis de Grèce by André Cardinal Destouches and Antoine Houdar de la Motte
- Premiere: 25 May 1715; King's Theatre, London

Amadigi di Gaula (HWV 11) is a "magic" opera in three acts, with music by George Frideric Handel. It was the fifth Italian opera that Handel wrote for an English theatre and the second he wrote for Richard Boyle, 3rd Earl of Burlington in 1715. The opera about a damsel in distress is based on Amadis de Grèce, a French tragédie-lyrique by André Cardinal Destouches and Antoine Houdar de la Motte. Amadigi was written for a small cast, employing four high voices. Handel made prominent use of wind instruments, so the score is unusually colorful, comparable to his Water Music.

The opera received its first performance in London at the King's Theatre in the Haymarket on 25 May 1715, in a lavish successful production. Charles Burney maintained near the end of the eighteenth century: Amadigi contained "...more invention, variety and good composition, than in any one of the musical dramas of Handel which I have yet carefully and critically examined".

== History ==
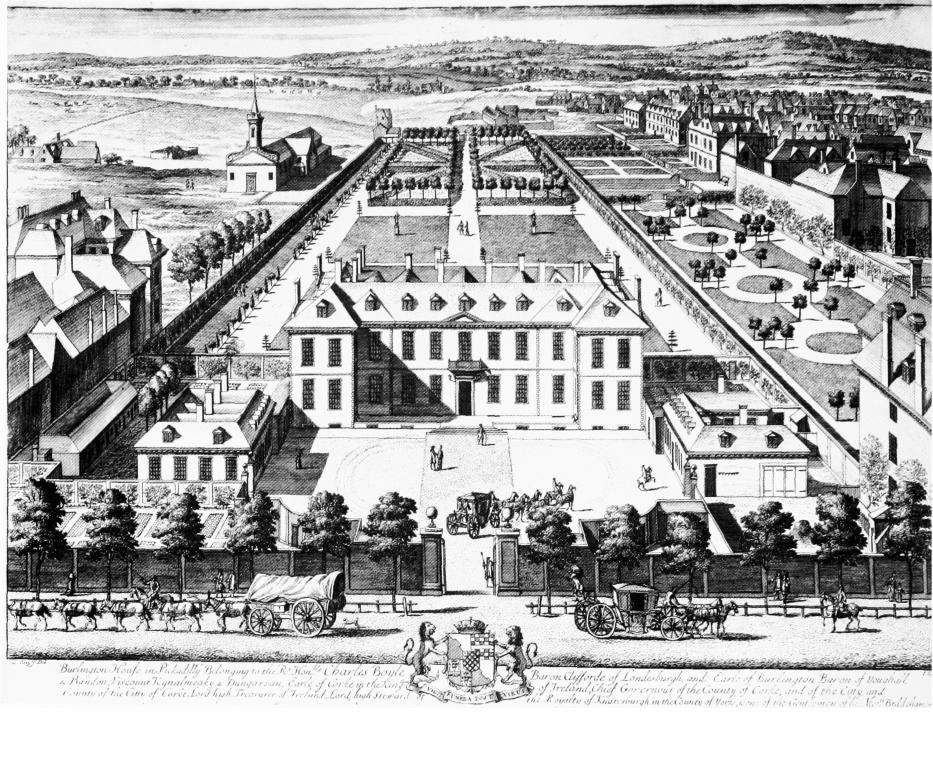
Burlington House in the 1690s

Handel composed Amadigi in 1715 for Richard Boyle, 3rd Earl of Burlington, during his stay at Burlington House. The identity of the librettist is not known for certain. Previous consensus had been that John Jacob Heidegger, who signed the dedication to Richard Boyle was the author, but more recent research has indicated that the librettist was more likely to be Giacomo Rossi, with Nicola Francesco Haym as a more probable candidate.

The original manuscript of Amadigi has disappeared, along with ballet sections in the music. Only one edition of the libretto is known, dating from 1715. Two published editions of the opera exist, the Händelgesellschaft edition of 1874, and the first critical edition, by J. Merrill Knapp, which Bärenreiter published in 1971. Dean has examined the history of various manuscripts which contain alternative selections for the score. Following this work, Handel composed no operas for five years.

=== Performance history ===
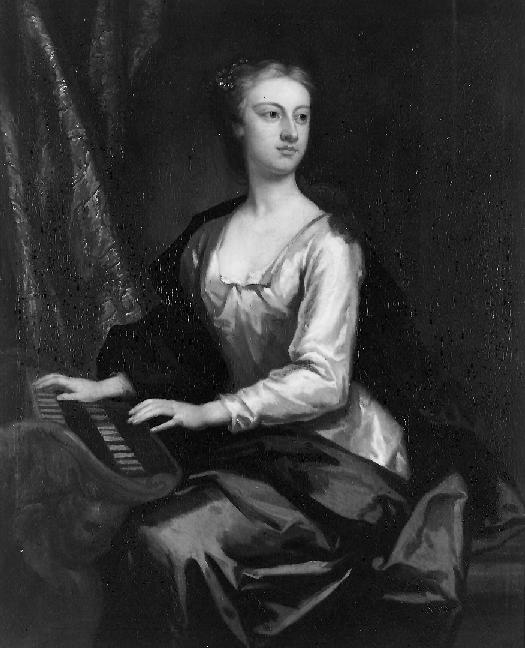
Anastasia Robinson, who created the role of Oriana

Amadigi di Gaula was premiered in London at the King's Theatre in the Haymarket on 25 May 1715. Exceptional care was lavished on the production, which was a success. The King attended several performances. The opera received a known minimum of 17 further performances in London until 1717. In act 2, Amadigi addresses the Fountain of True Love in a long cavatina of the utmost sensuous beauty. This scene was famous originally for its spectacular effects. The "coup de théâtre" was the use of a real fountain spraying real water. The scene employed a large number of stage engineers and plumbers, such that the following newspaper announcement appeared on the day of the premiere: "whereas there is a great many Scenes and Machines to be mov'd in this Opera, which cannot be done if persons should stand upon the Stage (where they could not be without Danger), it is therefore hop'd no Body, even the Subscribers, will take ill that they must be deny'd Entrance on the Stage". The singer Elisabetta Pilotti-Schiavonetti in the role of Melissa, who specialised in playing sorceresses, and for whom Handel had written the similar parts of the witch-like Armida in Rinaldo and Medea in Teseo is distinguished in Handel's music between her vengeful character and that of the other leading female part, the sweet Princess Oriana.

Hamburg saw 17 performances from 1717 to 1720, but with a different title, Oriana. The opera then fell into neglect and was not revived until 1929 in Osnabrück and subsequently in England in 1968, by Unicorn Opera at the Abbey Hall, Abingdon, Oxfordshire. With the revival of interest in Baroque music and historically informed musical performance since the 1960s, Amadigi, like all Handel operas, has received performances at festivals and opera houses. Among other performances, the opera received its North American premiere in March 2003 at Western University's Don Wright Faculty of Music. and the first fully staged production in North America was in July 2011 at Central City Opera in Central City, Colorado. A production of Amadigi di Gaula was seen at the Göttingen International Handel Festival in 2012 and the opera received a production by Haymarket Opera, Chicago in 2015. The French Baroque performing group Les Paladins created a production of the piece in 2019 which was performed in a number of theatres including the Théâtre de l'Athénée, Paris.

== Music ==
Amadigi was written for a small cast, employing no voices lower than alto. The opera is scored for two recorders, two oboes, bassoon, trumpet, strings, and basso continuo (cello, lute, harpsichord). Unusually for the period, it ends in a minor mode. What interested Handel was the emotions and the sufferings of the four characters. not the descriptive effects of his later "magic" operas. The sole preoccupation of each of the protagonists is to make the others fall in or out of love with them. Handel went deeper into their sentiments than he ever would again.

According to Winton Dean the quality of the score, especially the first two acts, is remarkably high, but it shows less careful organization than most of the later operas. He also states that the tonal design seems off balance. The conception of an opera as a coherent structural organism was slow to capture Handel's imagination.

The four personalities are differentiated in character. Handel made prominent use of wind instruments, so the score is colorful, comparable to his Water Music. He used oboes, bassoon and recorders to render emotions. A single trumpet is at times combined with an oboe. While this may have had financial reasons, it became an interesting orchestral sound.

== Roles ==
Roles, voice types, and premiere cast
| Role | Voice type | Premiere cast, 25 May 1715 |
|---|---|---|
| Amadigi | alto castrato | Nicolo Grimaldi ("Nicolini") (Note: Nicolini sang eight newly composed arias and a duet with each of the primadonnas) |
| Oriana | soprano | Anastasia Robinson |
| Melissa | soprano | Elisabetta Pilotti-Schiavonetti |
| Dardano | contralto | Diana Vico |
| Orgando | soprano | (unknown) |

== Setting ==
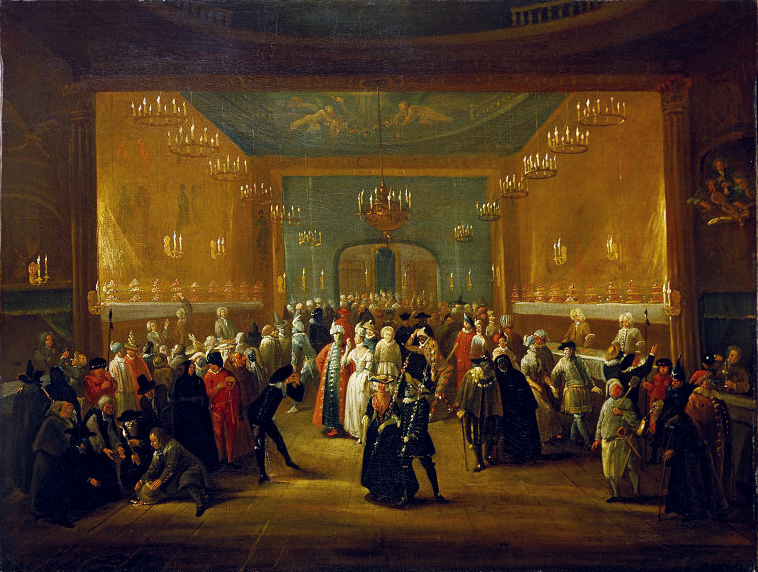
A Masquerade ball at the King's Theatre, Haymarket (c. 1724)

The libretto is an adaptation of a medieval Spanish knight-errantry epic Amadis de Gaula in which the King of Gaul, educated in Scotland, falls in love with and eventually marries Oriana, daughter of the King of England. Amadis de Gaula by Garci Rodríguez de Montalvo is a prose pastoral romance written towards the close of the fourteenth century. Like any romance of chivalry, Amadís de Gaula is a nightmare to summarise owing to its length, numerous characters, and complicated subplots. The work has a complicated history.

Oriana was heiress to the throne of England. Amadis of Gaul is a prince born of a secret amour, educated in Scotland, reared as a knight, and serving devotedly the fair English princess Oriana. For her sake, he contends against monsters and enchantments, and defends her father's kingdom from an oppressor. Richard B. Beams wrote:

"The sorceress Melissa, infatuated with Amadigi, has imprisoned Oriana in a tower and both Amadigi and Dardano in her garden. After various deceptions, visions, and trials, the two lovers, Amadigi and Oriana, are finally united. Before then, Amadigi will slay Dardano, his companion turned rival, and Melissa will stab herself finding her supernatural powers impotent against the power of love."

The plot ranges across the continent to Romania and Constantinople, and in the continuations as far as the Holy Land and the Cyclades. However, the romance's geography cannot be mapped onto the "real" Europe: it contains just as many fantastic places as real ones.

"When the Spaniards first saw Mexico, they said to each other it was like the places of enchantment which were spoken of in the book of Amadis. This was in 1549."

Historically, Amadís was very influential amongst the Spanish conquistadores. Bernal Diaz del Castillo mentioned the wonders of Amadís upon witnessing the wonders of the New World – and such place names as California and Patagonia come directly from the work. David Kimbell compared in detail the treatments of the story by Handel and Destouches.

== Synopsis ==
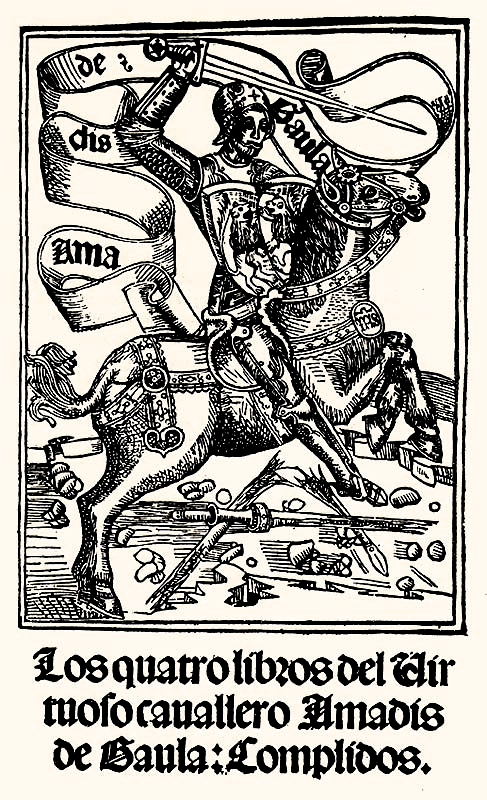
Amadís de Gaula by Garci Rodríguez de Montalvo, printed in Zaragoza by Jorge Coci (1508).

=== Act 1 ===
Amadigi, a Paladin, and Dardano, the Prince of Thrace, are both enamoured with Oriana, the daughter of the King of the Fortunate Isles. Oriana prefers Amadigi in her affections. Also attracted to Amadigi is the sorceress Melissa, who tries to capture Amadigi's affections by various spells, pleadings and even threats. Amadigi confronts various spirits and furies, but rebuffs them at practically every turn. One particular vision at the "Fountain of True Love", however, of Oriana courting Dardano upsets Amadigi to the point that he faints. Oriana sees Amadigi prostrate, and is about to stab herself with his sword when he awakens. He immediately berates her for her apparent betrayal of him, and in his turn tries to stab himself.

=== Act 2 ===
Still alive, Amadigi continues to resist the advances of Melissa. Melissa then makes Dardano look like Amadigi, to deceive Oriana. Oriana follows Dardano, in the visage of Amadigi, to beg his pardon. Dardano exults in the attention of Oriana, and in an impulsive moment, challenges Amadigi to single combat. In the duel, Amadigi kills Dardano. Melissa accuses Oriana of stealing Amadigi from her, and calls upon dark spirits to assault Oriana, who resists all of Melissa's incantations.

Dardano's celebrated aria Pena tiranna io sento al core from Act 2 is notable for its prominent bassoon part and its chord sequence based on the circle of fifths or, rather, circle of fourths. The introduction is shown in the score as one of the Baroque examples.

=== Act 3 ===
Amadigi and Oriana have been imprisoned by Melissa. The two lovers are willing to sacrifice themselves for each other. Though desirous of revenge, Melissa cannot quite yet kill Amadigi, but torments him by prolonging his confinement in chains. Amadigi and Oriana ask Melissa for mercy. Melissa summons the ghost of Dardano to assist her in her revenge, but the ghost says that the gods are predisposed to protect Amadigi and Oriana, and that their trials are nearly done. Rejected on all levels, by the gods, the underworld spirits, and Amadigi, Melissa takes her own life, with one final plea to Amadigi to feel a shade of pity for her. In the manner of a deus ex machina, Orgando, uncle of Oriana and a sorcerer himself, descends from the sky in a chariot and blesses the union of Amadigi and Oriana. A dance of shepherds and shepherdesses concludes the opera.

== Recordings ==
- Erato 2252 454902: Nathalie Stutzmann, Bernarda Fink, Eiddwhen Harrhy, Jennifer Smith; Les Musiciens du Louvre; Marc Minkowski, conductor
- Naïve AM 133: Maria Riccarda Wesseling, Elena de la Merced, Sharon Rostorf-Zamir, Jordi Domènech; Al Ayre Español; Eduardo Lopez Banzo. Release Date: 26 February 2008
- Chandos CHSA04062: Tim Mead, Mary Bevan, Anna Dennis, Hilary Summers, Patrick Terry; Early Opera Company; Christian Curnyn, conductor. Release date: 16 September 2022
