= Elisabetta Pilotti-Schiavonetti =

Italian operatic soprano

Elisabetta Pilotti-Schiavonetti (c. 1680 – 5 May 1742) was an Italian operatic soprano who was associated with the House of Hanover. She was one of the leading prima donnas at the Queen's Theatre in the Haymarket (it later became the "King's Theatre" after King George I's accession in 1714) from 1710 to 1717. She is best remembered today for creating roles in at least four operas by George Frideric Handel, possibly five. Three of the roles that Handel wrote specifically for her were sorceresses, and the demands of those roles indicate that she possessed an exceptional voice capable of both dramatic power and technical agility. She is said to have had a bitter rivalry with the Queen's other leading soprano, Isabella Girardeau.

== Life and career ==
Pilotti-Schiavonetti was born in Italy sometime during the last quarter of the 17th century. She was married to the Venetian oboist, cellist, and harpsichordist Giovanni Schiavonetti. Prior to their careers in England, the couple worked as musicians in the court of Sophia Dorothea of Hanover. It was there that the couple first made the acquaintance of Handel during the composer's early career in Germany. The couple came to London in 1710 when Giovanni took a position as a court musician for Sophia's brother, George II of Great Britain.

Soon after arriving in England, Pilotti-Schiavonetti was offered a position at the Queen's Theatre. She made her debut with the company in November 1710 in Francesco Mancini's Idaspe fedele. On 24 February 1711 she sang the role of Armida in the momentous premiere of Handel's first opera for the London stage, Rinaldo. The work was notably the first Italian language opera written specifically for the English theatre. A tremendous success with the public, a further 12 performances were immediately scheduled after its premiere; at the end of the run, popular demand was such that two more were added. The opera was played at the theatre in most seasons until 1716–17, and Pilotti-Schiavonetti was the only singer from the original cast that appeared in all 47 performances of the opera up to that point.

Evidently Pilotti-Schiavonetti's voice and skill as an actress impressed Handel, as the composer went on to compose at least three more roles for the soprano. She created parts in the world premieres of Handel's Il pastor fido (1712, Amarilli), Teseo (1713, Medea), and Amadigi di Gaula (1715, Melissa). It is likely that she also created the part of Metella in Handel's Silla (1713), but this fact cannot be definitely proven. She was also seen at the Queen's Theatre in Francesco Gasparini's Antioco and Ambleto; Giovanni Bononcini's Etearco; and in numerous pasticcios.

A letter from 1716 described Pilotti-Schiavonetti as a servant of Caroline of Ansbach, the Princess of Wales. She and her husband returned to Germany a few years later. They were committed to the court at Stuttgart in 1726 where Elisabetta sang in several comic operas, including Pyramus and Thisbe under the direction of her husband. They then returned to Hanover where Giovanni died in 1730, followed by Elisabetta in 1742.

== Sources ==
- Daub, Peggy Ellen (1985). Music at the Court of George II (r. 1727-1760). Cornell University Press.
- Dean, Winton (2008). Laura Williams Macy (ed.). The Grove Book of Opera Singers. Oxford University Press. ISBN 9780195337655.
- Dean, Winton; Knapp, J Merrill (1995). Handel's operas: 1704–1726. Oxford: Oxford University Press. ISBN 978-0-19-816441-8. Originally published in 1987
- Kobbé, Gustav; Lascelles, George (2000). The New Kobbé's opera book. New York City: G. P. Putnam's Sons.
- Timms, Colin (2003). Polymath of the baroque: Agostino Steffani and his music. Oxford: Oxford University Press. ISBN 978-0-19-515473-3.
