= Alceste (Handel) =

Incidental music by Georg Friedrich Händel

George Frideric Handel

Alceste ("Alcides"; HWV 45, HG 46b, HHA I/30) is a masque, semi-opera or incidental music by George Frideric Handel (or Georg Friederich Händel in German). It was the only complete theatre project ever attempted by Handel, and he composed the music when he was nearly 65.

Alceste was planned in a prodigal collaboration between the businessman John Rich, the famous scenographer Servandoni and the theater author Tobias George Smollett (1721–1771) (who wrote a now lost play with the same title (Alceste), based on the homonymous tragedy of Euripides) and possibly included song lyrics by Handel's frequent collaborator Thomas Morell (1703–1784), which was rehearsed at Covent Garden Theatre but never performed. Notes by the librettist Thomas Morell suggest that the play may have been canceled due to Handel's incidental music being considered too difficult for the cast. However, it seems that John Rich may have simply decided that an adaptation of a Euripides drama would be a very risky adventure. After all, that was a period when the tastes of the London public were as volatile as the explosives that destroyed Servandoni's "Temple of Peace" during the presentation of Handel's Music for "Fireworks" in Green Park.

This incidental music includes an overture and songs for Acts 1 and 4, 19 movements in total. It was composed from 27 December 1749 to 8 January 1750. Handel later used the music in The Choice of Hercules, HWV 69, and revivals of Alexander Balus, HWV 65, and Hercules, HWV 60.

== Recordings ==
Rodrigo discography
Recording date	Principal singers	Conductor, Orchestra	Label
1979, July	Emma Kirkby, Judith Nelson, Christina Pound, Paul Elliott, Rogers Covey-Crump; Catherine Denly, Margaret Cable, Christopher Keyte, David Thomas	Christopher Hogwood, Academy of Ancient Music	CD: L'Oiseau-Lyre; Cat: 421 479-2
1997, August 6–8	Stéphanie Révidat, Roxanne Comiotto, Jean Delescluse, François Bazola	Franck-Emmanuel Comte, Le Concert de l'Hostel Dieu	CD: Absalon; Cat: LCHD897
2011, November 7–8	Lucy Crowe, Benjamin Hulett, Andrew Foster-Williams	Christian Curnyn, Early Opera Company	CD: Chandos Early Music; Cat: CHAN0788
