= Pilotti =

Pilotti is an Italian surname. Notable people with the surname include:

- Eva-Lena Pilotti (born 1961), Swedish model
- Massimo Pilotti (1879–1962), Italian jurist and judge

== See also ==
- Elisabetta Pilotti-Schiavonetti (c. 1680 – 1742), Italian opera singer
