= Giacomo Rossi =

Italian poet, translator and librettist

Giacomo Rossi was an Italian poet, translator and librettist who settled in London early in the 18th century and wrote librettos for George Frideric Handel, between 1710 and 1729.

According to Rossi Rinaldo was written by Handel in a fortnight. Aaron Hill seems to have given his sketch to Rossi to translate. The libretto is according to Winton Dean confusing.

Rossi probably worked on Il pastor fido and Silla. Handel emerges from the enterprise with scarcely more credit than Rossi.

Rossi's name is also mentioned with for the libretto of Amadigi di Gaula, or assisting in Poro re dell'Indie and Lotario. The result of this latter work is unusually concise and easily understandable for a baroque opera. Rossi not only shortened the recitatives for Handel, but improved the text by shortening, rearranging and rewriting it. Almost half of the text was new.

In 1729 Paolo Antonio Rolli wrote: You will have heard by now that Attilio and Haym have died. I inform you now that the famed Rossi, Italian writer and poet is Handel’s librettist.

== Sources ==
- Dean, Winton; Knapp, J. Merrill (1987). Handel's Operas, 1704–1726. Clarendon Press. ISBN 0-19-315219-3
- Dean, Winton (2006). Handel's Operas, 1726–1741, p. 173. The Boydell Press. ISBN 1-84383-268-2
