= Christian Curnyn =

British conductor specializing in Baroque music

Christian Curnyn is a British conductor, harpsichordist and baroque music specialist.

== Early life ==
Curnyn was born in Glasgow in April 1971. After reading Music at the University of York, he took postgraduate studies on the harpsichord at the Guildhall School of Music and Drama. In 1994, after graduating from the university, he founded the award-winning Early Opera Company.

== Career ==
Much in demand on the operatic scene, in the UK Curnyn has conducted for Bampton Classical Opera (Gluck's Le Cinesi), Scottish Opera (Handel's Semele), Opera North (Handel's Saul), Grange Park Opera (Semele, Mozart's The Marriage of Figaro, and Cavalli's Eliogabalo) and Garsington Opera (Die Zauberflöte). He is a regular at English National Opera where successes have included Olivier Award-winning productions of Handel's Partenope, and Rameau’s Castor et Pollux (dir. Barrie Kosky), After Dido (Katie Mitchell’s realisation of Purcell’s Dido and Aeneas), Handel's Giulio Cesare, Charpentier's Medée, and Handel's Rodelinda.

For The Royal Opera, Covent Garden he has conducted Britten’s The Beggar's Opera, Cavalli's Ormindo to inaugurate their series at the Sam Wanamaker Playhouse at Shakespeare's Globe, where he returned for Luigi Rossi’s Orfeo (nominated for an Olivier Award), and Claudio Monteverdi’s Il ritorno d’Ulisse at the Roundhouse, as well as Solomon in concert on the main stage with his Early Opera Company. In 2022 Curnyn conducted Handel's Alcina directed by Richard Jones.

Further afield he has worked with Opera Australia (Partenope), Landestheater Salzburg (Vivaldi’s Farnace and Handel's Ariodante), Frankfurt Opera (Cavalli's La Calisto and Gluck’s Ezio), Komische Oper Berlin (Rameau's Castor et Pollux and Zoroastre), Opéra national du Rhin (Die Zauberflöte), Teatro Nacional de São Carlos (Idomeneo), Konzert Theater Bern (Don Giovanni) and Stuttgart Opera (Rameau's Platée, Purcell's The Fairy Queen and Handel's Alcina). In the USA Christian Curnyn has conducted Partenope and Mozart's Così fan tutte for New York City Opera, Handel's Tolomeo for Glimmerglass Opera, and Cavalli's Giasone and Charpentier's Medée for Chicago Opera Theater.

Specialist early music ensembles Curnyn has worked with include Academy of Ancient Music, Akademie für Alte Musik Berlin, English Concert, Irish and Wroclaw Baroque orchestras. With his Early Opera Company he has conducted many high-profile performances including their debut at the 2010 BBC Proms. They frequently perform at London's Wigmore Hall, St John's Smith Square, at the Cheltenham Festival, Spitalfields Festival, York Early Music Festival, London Festival of Baroque Music, Kilkenny Arts Festival, and made their debut at the Amsterdam Concertgebouw in 2019 with a live-broadcast double-bill of Blow Venus and Adonis and Purcell Dido and Aeneas for the NTR ZaterdagMatinee series.

Alongside this work he takes a particular interest in performing Baroque and Classical repertoire with modern forces, including collaborations with Bournemouth Symphony, Ulster Orchestra, Hallé, Scottish Chamber Orchestra (including a recording on the Decca label with Nicola Benedetti ), Swedish Chamber Orchestra, Stavanger Symphony, Philharmonie Essen, and further afield with the Tasmania, West Australia, and Adelaide Symphony Orchestras.

== Discography ==
Christian Curnyn's extensive discography with the Early Opera Company for the Chandos label includes their 2005 recording of Partenope which won widespread critical acclaim, and their recording of Semele was chosen as a Best Recording of 2008 by The Sunday Times, Editor's Choice in Gramophone Magazine and awarded the 2008 Stanley Sadie Handel Prize. Further releases on the Chandos label include John Eccles’ The Judgement of Paris (awarded a Diapason d'Or), Britten's The Beggar's Opera, and Handel's Flavio, Alceste (winner of the Opera award in the BBC Music Magazine Awards 2013), Serse, Il Trionfo del Tempo for Wigmore Live and in 2017, Acis & Galatea (winner of the Opera category of the BBC Music Magazine Awards 2019). In September 2022, the Early Opera Company released Handel's Amadigi di Gaula, featuring Tim Mead, Hilary Summers, Anna Dennis and Mary Bevan.
