= The Judgment of Paris (opera) =

Libretto by Congreve

The Judgment of Paris is an operatic libretto written by William Congreve. It was set by four British Baroque composers – John Weldon, John Eccles, Daniel Purcell and Gottfried Finger – as part of a music competition held in 1700-1701. Thomas Arne later composed a score to the libretto in 1742.

== Roles ==
- Mercury, messenger of the gods
- Paris, a shepherd
- Juno, goddess of marriage. This role was taken by the soprano Mary Hodgson.
- Pallas, goddess of war
- Venus, goddess of love. This role was performed by soprano Anne Bracegirdle.
- Chorus

== Synopsis ==
Setting: Mount Ida

The god Mercury descends from the sky with the golden apple of Discord and asks the shepherd Paris to award it to whichever of the three goddesses – Juno, Pallas and Venus – he finds most worthy. Juno offers him worldly power, Pallas victory in war, and Venus the most beautiful woman in the world. Paris gives the golden apple to Venus.

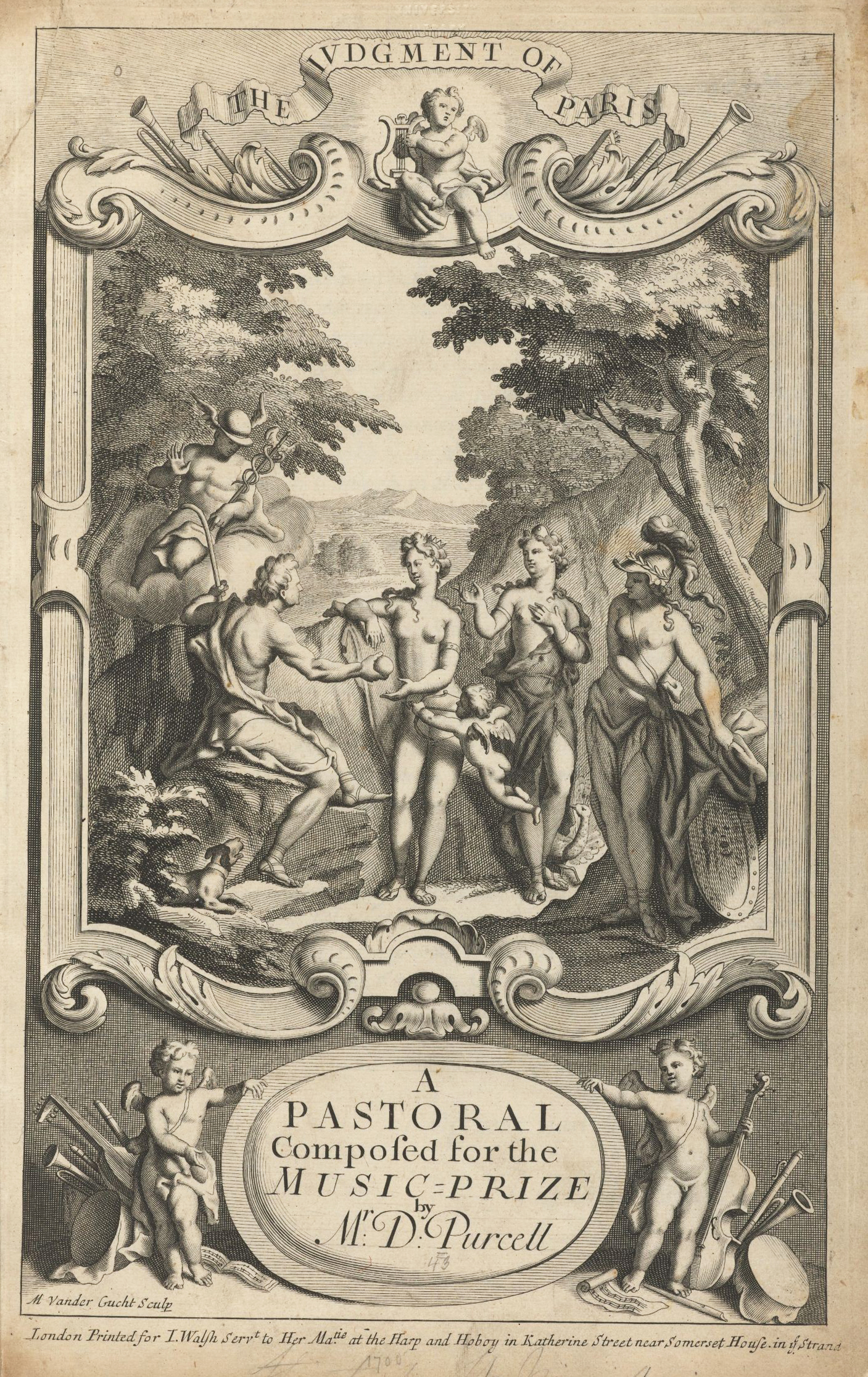
The Judgment of Paris: a pastoral composed for the music-prize, 1700, by Daniel Purcell

== The "Musick Prize" ==
A group of English nobles headed by Lord Halifax had become interested in promoting all-sung English opera (most English operas of the day took the form of semi-operas mixing music and spoken drama). In an announcement in the London Gazette of 18 March 1700 they offered a "Musick Prize" for the best setting of Congreve's short libretto. First prize was 100 guineas, second 50, third 30, and fourth 20.

Four composers entered the competition: John Weldon, John Eccles, Daniel Purcell and Gottfried Finger. Their works were performed individually during the spring of 1701, then staged together in a grand final at the Dorset Garden Theatre on 3 June 1703. The audience judged the winner. Eccles had been expected to win but in the event he came second to Weldon with Daniel Purcell third and Finger fourth. The competition had little long-term success in promoting all-sung opera in English. The London stage would soon be dominated by Italian opera and both Eccles and Daniel Purcell gave up writing theatre music.

The competition was re-staged in the Royal Albert Hall as part of the 1989 BBC Proms season. Anthony Rooley conducted the Consorte of Musicke and Concerto Köln in performances of the three surviving scores (Finger's has been lost). Once again, the audience decided the winner and this time they awarded first prize to Eccles.

== Arne's version ==
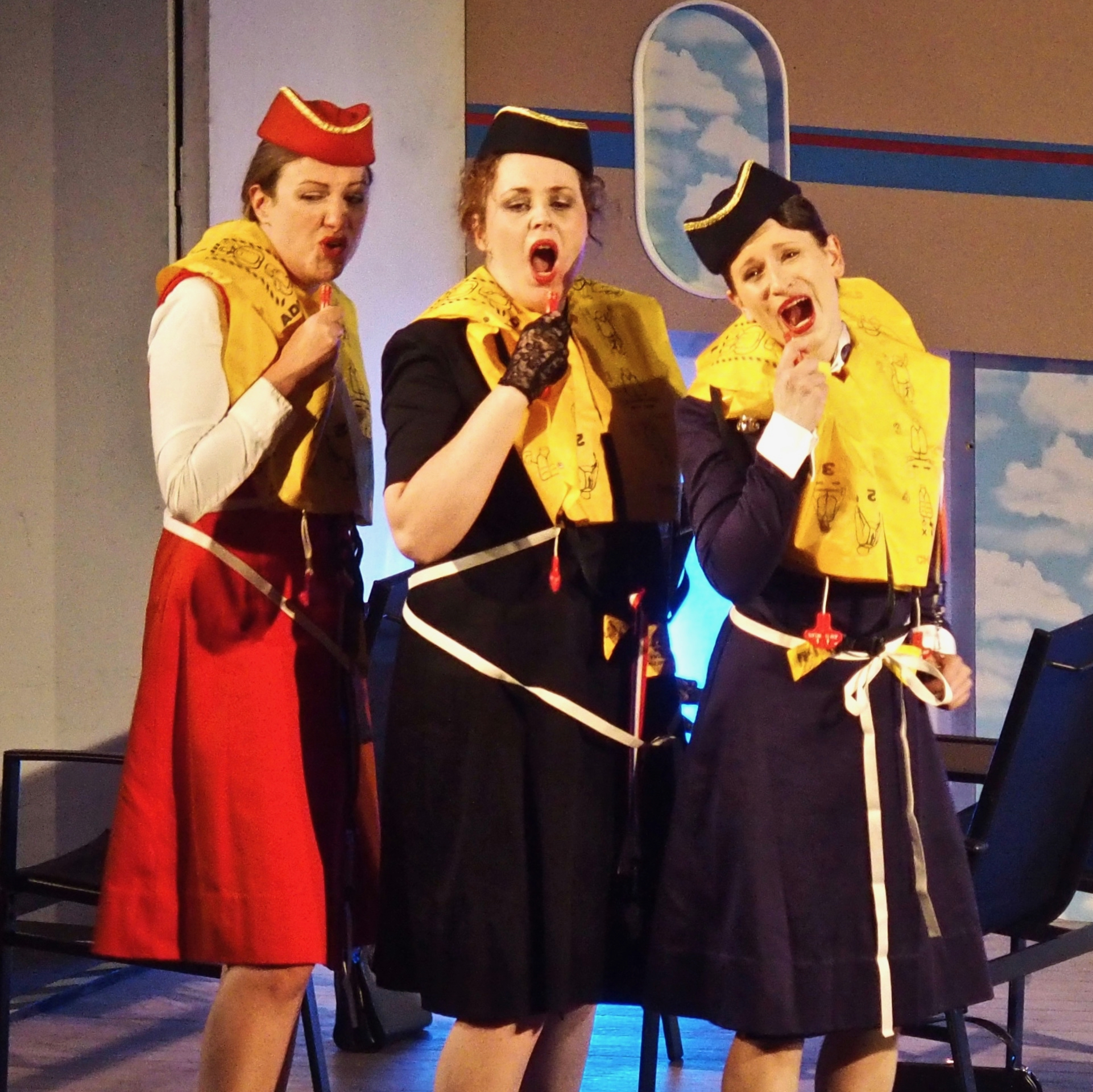
Catherine Backhouse (Pallas Athena), Aoife O'Sullivan (Venus), Barbara Cole Walton (Juno) in Bampton Classical Opera's 2016 production of Thomas Arne's Judgment of Paris

Thomas Arne set The Judgement of Paris as part of a revival of interest in libretti by Congreve in the 1740s (Handel's Semele would appear in 1744). Arne's version was first performed at Drury Lane Theatre on 12 March 1742, with the composer's wife Cecilia Young in the role of Venus. Arne staged the work as a companion piece to his masque Alfred in June of the same year in Dublin. The Arne version was performed by Bampton Classical Opera in 2010 and 2016.

== Recordings ==
- The Judgment of Paris (Eccles' version) Benjamin Hulett, Roderick Williams, Susan Bickley, Claire Booth, Lucy Crowe, Chorus and Orchestra of Early Opera Company, conducted by Christian Curnyn Chandos CHAN 0759 (2009)
- The Judgment of Paris (Daniel Purcell's version) Anna Dennis (Venus), Amy Freston (Pallas), Ciara Hendricks (Juno), Samuel Boden (Paris), Ashley Riches (Mercury), Rodolfus Choir, Spiritato!, conducted by Julian Perkins (Resonus Classics, download-only version, 2014)
- The Judgment of Paris (Thomas Arne's version) Mary Bevan (Venus), Susanna Fairbairn (Pallas), Gillian Ramm (Juno), Ed Lyon (Paris), Anthony Gregory (Mercury), Andrew Mahon (bass) The Brook Street Band, John Andrews, Dutton CDLX 7361 (2019)
- The Judgment of Paris (John Weldon's version) Thomas Walker, Jonathan Brown, Helen Charlston, Kitty Whately, Anna Dennis, Academy of Ancient Music AAM 046 (2025)

== Sources ==
- The Viking Opera Guide ed. Holden (1993)
- Booklet notes to the Eccles recording by Lindsay Kemp
- "That strain again", article by Lindsay Kemp in Gramophone magazine (August, 2007, pages 28 and 29)
