= Lascia ch'io pianga =

Soprano aria by composer George Frideric Handel

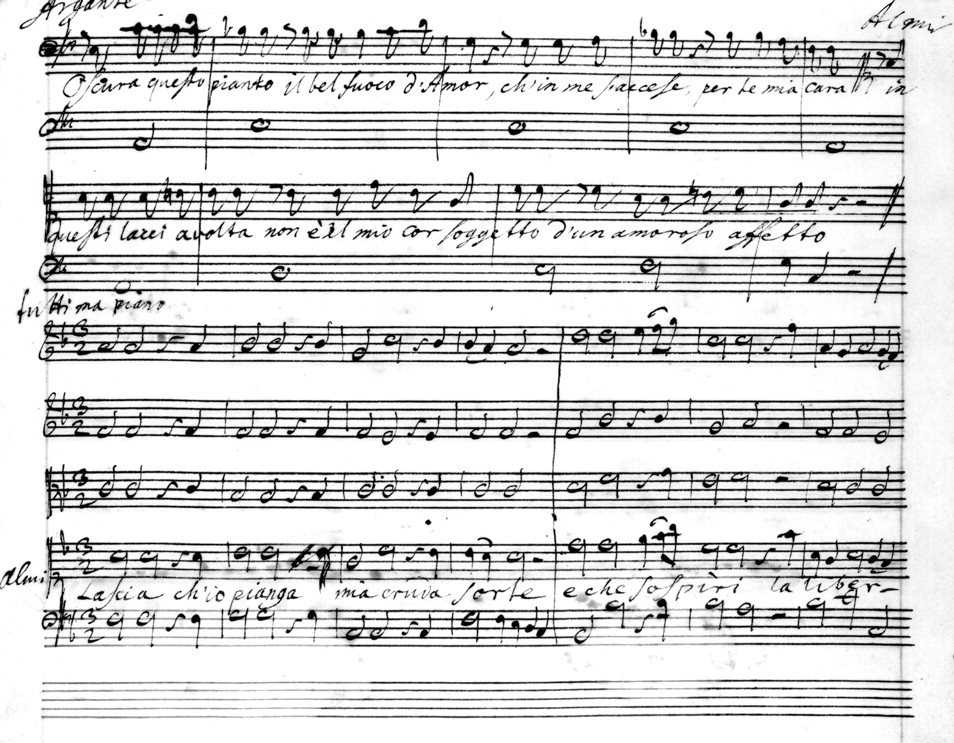
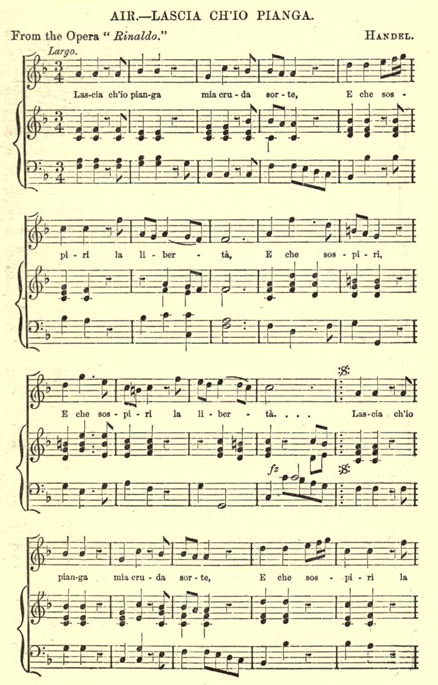
Left: Handel's 1711 autograph score showing the opening few bars of the aria; Right: 1876 aria sheet music

"Lascia ch'io pianga" (Italian: [ˈlaʃʃa ˈkiːo ˈpjaŋɡa]; English: "Let Me Weep"), originally "Lascia la spina, cogli la rosa" (Italian: [ˈlaʃʃa la ˈspiːna ˈkɔʎʎi la ˈrɔːza]; English: "Leave the Thorn, Take the Rose"), is an Italian-language soprano aria by composer George Frideric Handel that has become a popular concert piece.

== History ==
Its melody is first found in act 3 of Handel's 1705 opera Almira as a sarabande; the score for this can be seen on page 81 of Vol. 55 of Friedrich Chrysander. Handel then used the tune for the aria "Lascia la spina, cogli la rosa", or "Leave the Thorn, Take the Rose", for the character Piacere in part 2 of his 1707 oratorio Il trionfo del Tempo e del Disinganno (which was much later, in 1737, revised as Il trionfo del Tempo e della Verità).

Four years after that, in 1711, Handel used the music again, this time for his London opera Rinaldo and its act 2 aria "Lascia ch'io pianga" ("Let me weep"), a heartfelt plea for her liberty addressed by the character Almirena to her abductor Argante. Rinaldo was a triumph, and it is with this work that the aria is chiefly associated.

The aria has since been recorded by many artists, and is featured in several films including Farinelli; All Things Fair by Bo Widerberg; L.I.E. by Michael Cuesta; Antichrist and Nymphomaniac, both by Lars von Trier. In 2023, it featured in instrumental form, within the score of the anime film The Imaginary by Studio Ponoc. Most recently, in 2025, it featured in the film We Bury the Dead.

== Music ==
Handel wrote the aria in the key of F major with a time signature of 3/2 and a tempo marking of Largo. (Note: Subsequent publications in modern times have favoured a 3/4 metre, and it has been transposed into many different keys.) In the first edition published by John Walsh, the orchestration is unspecified, giving only a solo melody line above an unfigured bass line. There is the mention 'violins' at bar 23 where the singer breaks (bar 31 in most modern editions which include an 8-bar introduction). Chrysander claimed to have worked from Handel's 'performance score' and stated that the autograph manuscript had been lost (although RISM state that the British Library hold a fragment of the autograph missing 53 bars); Chrysander's edition shows two violins and a viola with a cello. He does not provide figuring for the continuo. It is not clear whether he invented the additional string parts himself (as he often did) or found them in the performance score to which he referred. Most modern editions seem to be based upon Chrysander's version, as can be seen from the different placement of certain syllables in the melismata in his version and in the Walsh first edition.

A performance takes about five minutes.

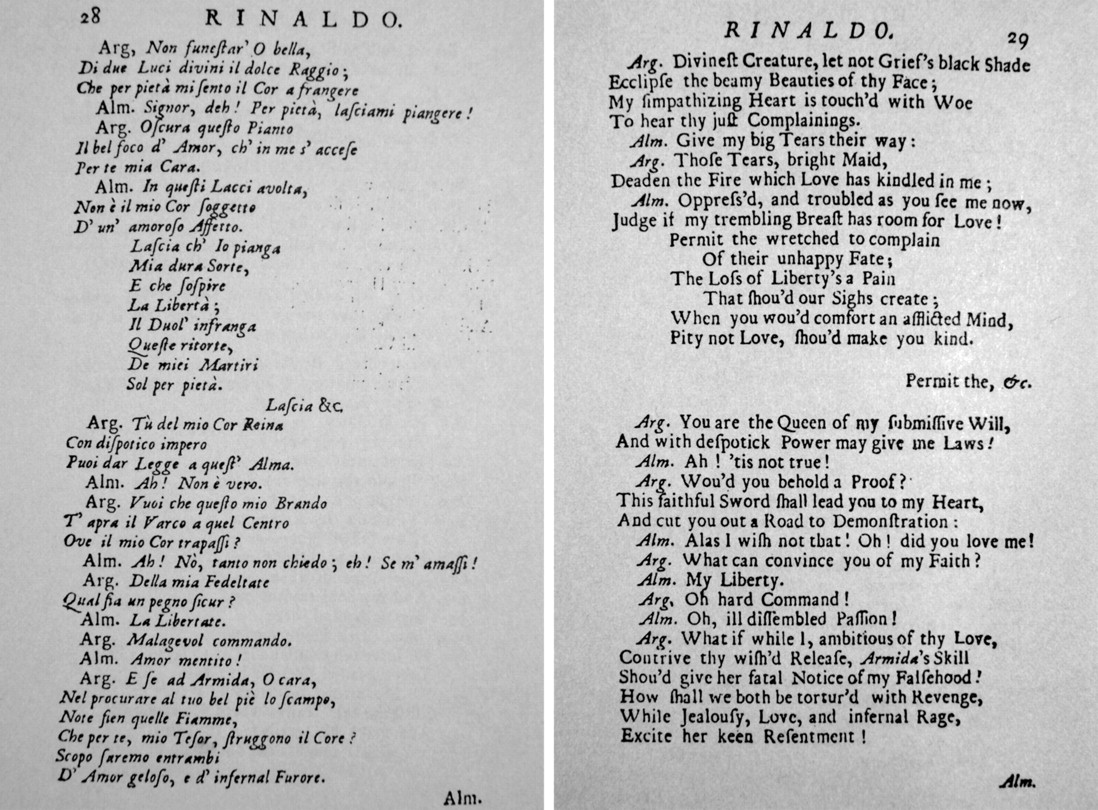
Pages from the 1711 libretto; Italian on the left, Aaron Hill's text on the right

== Libretto ==
Cardinal Benedetto Pamphili's text and lyrics for the 1707 version of the aria are:

Lascia la spina, cogli la rosa;
tu vai cercando il tuo dolor.
Canuta brina per mano ascosa,
giungerà quando nol crede il cuor.

Leave the thorn, pluck the rose;
you go searching for your pain.
Hoary frost by hidden hand
will come when your heart doesn't expect it.

Handel's 1739 pasticcio Giove in Argo also has a "Lascia la spina" aria, but a shorter one, less known, and set to a different melody.

The libretto for Rinaldo was written by Giacomo Rossi from a scenario provided by Aaron Hill. Almirena is addressing the Saracen king of Jerusalem, Argante, who is holding her prisoner and has just disclosed his passion at first sight for her. (Note: The original text by Aaron Hill is drawn from the booklet annexed to Jean-Claude Malgoire's first full recording of Rinaldo, released by CBS in 1977 (see also the reproduction of the 1711 libretto above). The text in rhyme, by Samuel Humphreys, is drawn from the 1731 libretto)

Rossi's Italian text
Lascia ch'io pianga
mia cruda sorte,
e che sospiri
la libertà.

Il duolo infranga
queste ritorte,
de' miei martiri
sol per pietà.

Literal translation
Let me weep over
my cruel fate,
and let me sigh for
liberty.

May sorrow shatter
these chains,
of my woes
out of pity alone.

Period translation in rhyme
Ah! leave me to the last Relief
Of Tears, to utter all my Grief,
And let me, thus by Fortune crost,
Lament the Liberty I've lost.

Compassion only can propose
The Remedy for all my Woes.
And this Regret, you utter here,
Should prove by Pity 'tis sincere.

Hill's original text
Permit the wretched to complain
Of their unhappy fate;
The loss of liberty's a pain
That should our sighs create.

When you wou'd comfort an afflicted mind,
Pity, not love, shou'd make you kind.
