= Rinaldo (opera) =

1711 opera by George Frideric Handel

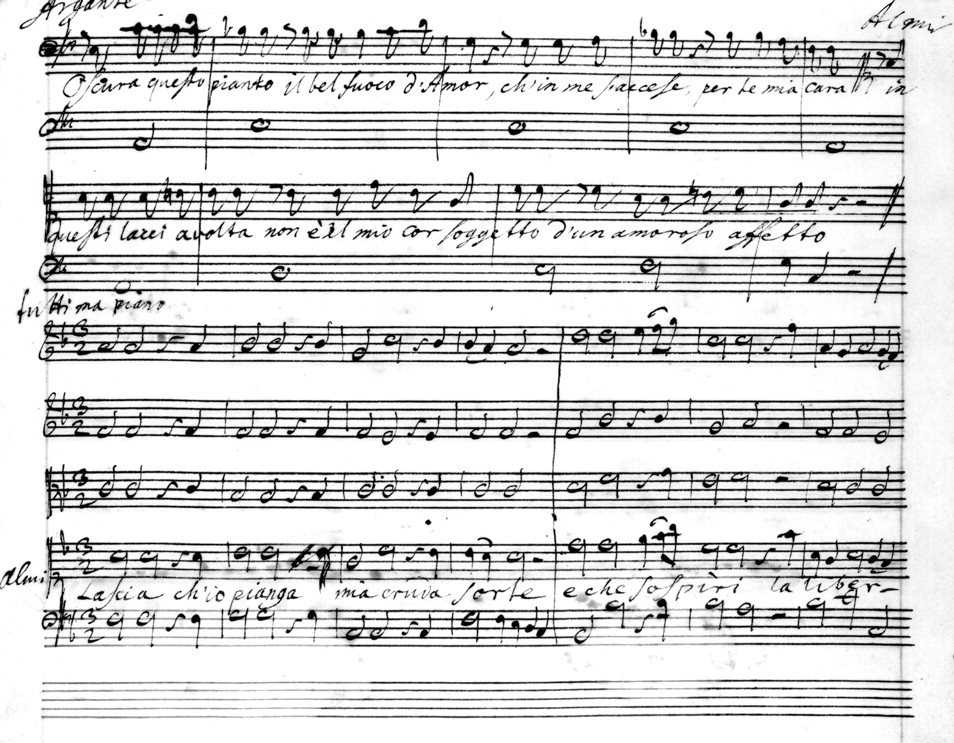
Almirena's recitative, and few bars of "Lascia ch'io pianga", from Handel's 1711 autograph score

Rinaldo (HWV 7) is an opera by George Frideric Handel, composed in 1711, and was the first Italian-language opera written specifically for the London stage. The libretto was prepared by Giacomo Rossi from a scenario provided by Aaron Hill, and the work was first performed at the Queen's Theatre in London's Haymarket on 24 February 1711. The story of love, war and redemption, set at the time of the First Crusade, is loosely based on Torquato Tasso's epic poem Gerusalemme liberata ("Jerusalem Delivered"), and its staging involved many original and vivid effects. It was a great success with the public, despite negative reactions from literary critics hostile to the contemporary trend towards Italian entertainment in English theatres.

Handel composed Rinaldo quickly, borrowing and adapting music from operas and other works that he had composed during a long stay in Italy in the years 1706–10, during which he established a considerable reputation. In the years following the premiere, he made numerous amendments to the score. Rinaldo is regarded by critics as one of Handel's greatest operas. Of its individual numbers, the soprano aria "Lascia ch'io pianga" has become a particular favourite, and is a popular concert piece.

Handel went on to dominate opera in England for several decades. Rinaldo was revived in London regularly up to 1717, and in a revised version in 1731; of all Handel's operas, Rinaldo was the most frequently performed during his lifetime. After 1731, however, the opera was not staged for more than 200 years. Renewed interest in baroque opera during the 20th century led to the first modern professional production in Handel's birthplace, Halle, Germany, in 1954. The opera was mounted sporadically over the following thirty years; after a successful run at New York's Metropolitan Opera in 1984, performances and recordings of the work have become more frequent worldwide. Rinaldo was the first Handel opera to have found its way to the Metropolitan. The opera's tercentenary in 2011 brought a modernized production at the Glyndebourne Festival.

== Background ==
Handel began to compose operas at the Oper am Gänsemarkt in Hamburg, where he spent the years 1703 to 1706; his principal influences were Johann Mattheson and Reinhard Keiser. At that time, German opera as a genre was still not clearly defined; in Hamburg the term Singspiel ("song-play") rather than opera described music dramas that combined elements of French and Italian opera, often with passages of spoken German dialogue. The music was, in the words of historian Donald Jay Grout, "tinged with the serious, heavy formality of Lutheran Germany". The first of Handel's early works in the German style was Almira, a considerable success when it was premiered on 8 January 1705. Over the next three years Handel composed three more operas in the German style, but all of these are now lost. However, fragments of the music from these works have been identified in later operas.

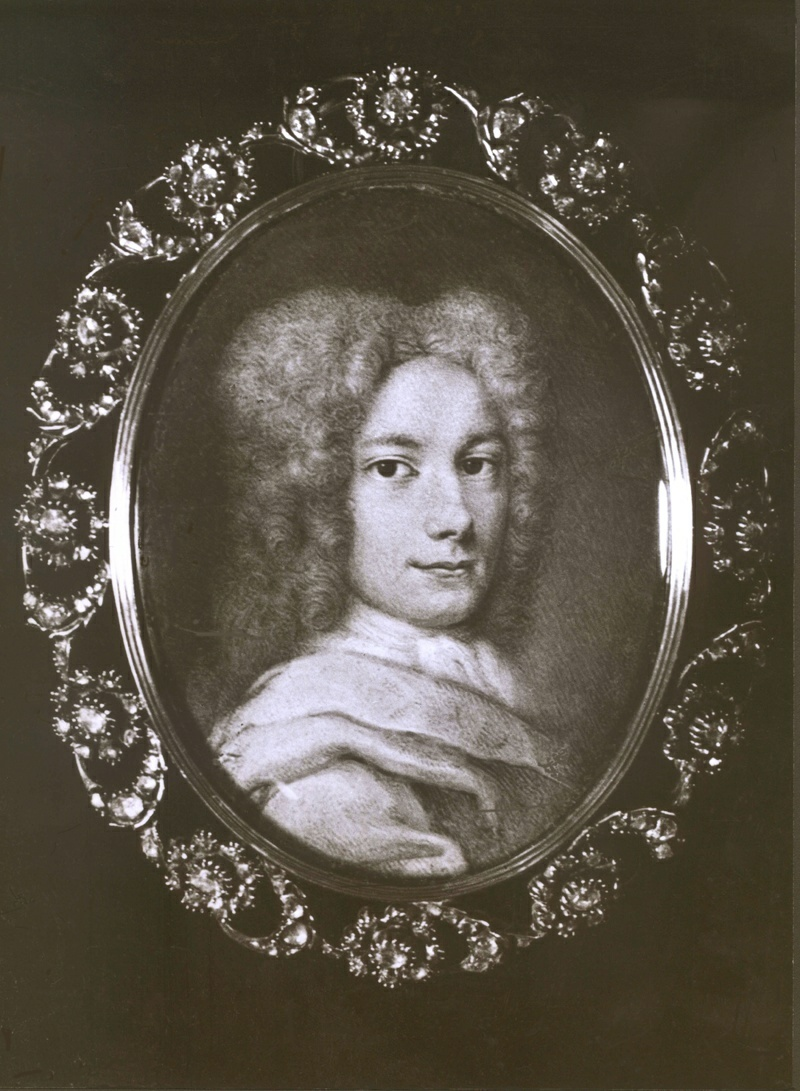
Handel, c. 1710

In autumn 1706 Handel went to Italy. He stayed for long periods in Florence, Rome, Naples and Venice, making frequent visits to the opera houses and concert halls. He obtained introductions to leading musicians, among them Arcangelo Corelli, Alessandro and Domenico Scarlatti, and Agostino Steffani, and met numerous singers and performers. From these acquaintances Handel learned the essential characteristics of Italian music, in particular (according to Dean and Knapp) "fluency in the treatment of Italian verse, accurate declamation and flexible harmonic rhythm in recitative, ... drawing the necessary distinction between vocal and instrumental material and, above all, the release of [his] wonderful melodic gift". Handel's first Italian opera, Rodrigo, showed an incomplete grasp of Italian style, with much of Keiser's Hamburg influence still evident; it was not a success when premiered in Florence, in late November or early December 1707. He followed this by a lengthy visit to Rome, where opera performances were then forbidden by papal decree, and honed his skills through the composition of cantatas and oratorios. In Rome, Handel met Cardinal Vincenzo Grimani, a diplomat and spare-time librettist; the result of this meeting was a collaboration which produced Handel's second Italian opera, Agrippina. After this work's triumphant premiere at the Teatro San Giovanni Grisostomo in Venice, on 26 December 1709, Handel became, says biographer P. H. Lang, "world famous and the idol of a spoiled and knowledgeable audience".

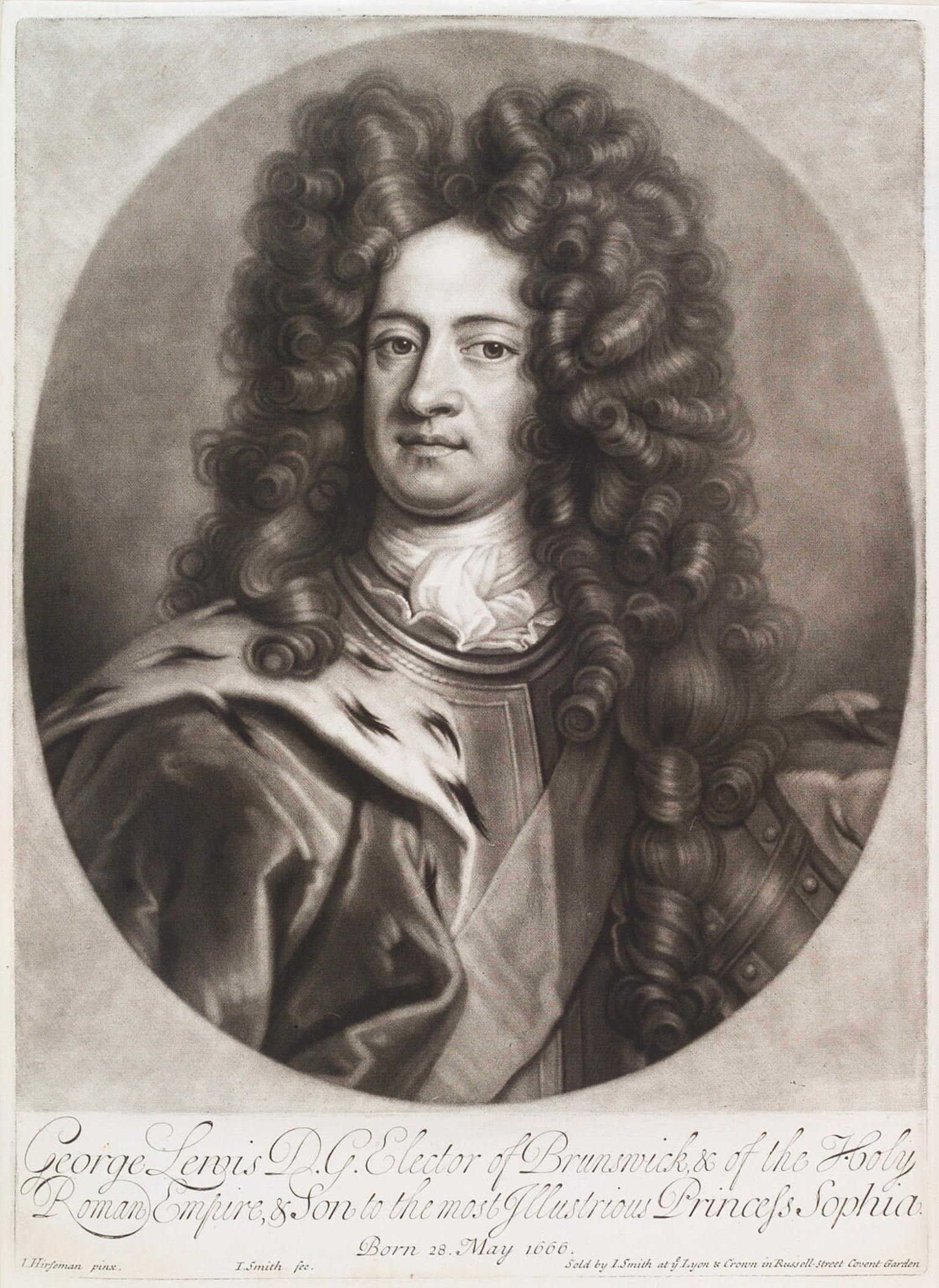
Georg Ludwig, Elector of Hanover and later George I of Great Britain, appointed Handel to the Hanover court in 1710.

This sudden recognition led to eager competition for Handel's services. Among those most keen to employ him was Prince Georg Ludwig, the Elector of Hanover and future King George I of Great Britain. In June 1710 Handel accepted the appointment of Kapellmeister to Georg's Hanover court, under terms that gave him considerable scope to pursue his own interests. On the basis of this freedom, in late 1710 Handel left Hanover for London, possibly in response to an earlier invitation from members of the English nobility. By 1711, informed London audiences had become familiar with the nature of Italian opera through the numerous pastiches and adaptations that had been staged. The former Royal Academy of Music Principal, Curtis Price, writes that the popularity of these pieces was the result of a deliberate strategy aimed at the suppression of English opera. Handel's music was relatively unknown in England, though his reputation from Agrippina was considerable elsewhere. A short "Italian Dialogue" he had written in honour of Queen Anne's birthday was well received when performed at St James's Palace on 6 February 1711.

In London, by means which are not documented, Handel secured a commission to write an Italian opera for the Queen's Theatre in the Haymarket (it became the "King's Theatre" after King George I's accession in 1714). This theatre, designed and built by Sir John Vanbrugh, had become London's main opera house; its manager, Aaron Hill, intended to mount the first Italian opera written specifically for London and had engaged an all-Italian company for the 1710–11 opera season. Hill employed an Italian poet and language teacher, Giacomo Rossi, to write a libretto based on a scenario that Hill prepared himself. As his subject Hill chose Gerusalemme liberata, an epic of the First Crusade by the 16th-century Italian poet Torquato Tasso; the opera was called Rinaldo, after its main protagonist. Hill was determined to exploit to the full the opportunities for lavish spectacle afforded by the theatre's machinery; his aim, according to Dean and Knapp, was "to combine the virtuosity of Italian singing with the extravagance of the 17th century masque".

== Roles ==
Roles, voice types, notes, premiere cast, references
Role (in singing order)	Voice type (1711)	Notes	Premiere cast, 24 February 1711 Conductor:	Ref.
Goffredo: leader of the First Crusade. 1096–99	contralto (en travesti)	Tenor after 1731 revision	Francesca Vanini-Boschi	
Rinaldo: a nobleman of the House of Este	alto castrato	Written in soprano clef, now sung by a contralto, mezzo-soprano or countertenor	Nicolò Grimaldi ("Nicolini")	
Almirena: daughter of Goffredo	soprano		Isabella Girardeau	
Eustazio: brother to Goffredo	alto castrato	This part was eliminated before the 1717 revival, and is often omitted from modern productions	Valentino Urbani ("Valentini")	
A herald	tenor	Bass in 1731 revival	"Lawrence"	
Argante: Saracen king of Jerusalem	bass	Contralto in 1731 revival, now usually bass	Giuseppe Boschi	
Armida: Queen of Damascus, Argante's mistress	soprano	Contralto in 1731 revival, now usually soprano	Elisabetta Pilotti-Schiavonetti	
Two mermaids	sopranos		Not recorded	
A woman	soprano	In some productions the woman's lines are sung by a mermaid	Not recorded	
A Christian magician	alto castrato	Bass from 1731 revival	Giuseppe Cassani	
Mermaids, spirits, fairies, officers, guards, attendants	Non-singing parts			

== Synopsis ==
- Place: in and around the city of Jerusalem during the First Crusade
- Time: 1099

=== Act 1 ===
The Crusader army under Goffredo is laying siege to Jerusalem, where the Saracen king Argante is confined with his troops. With Goffredo are his brother Eustazio, his daughter Almirena, and the knight Rinaldo. As Goffredo sings of the coming victory, Rinaldo declares his love for Almirena, and Goffredo confirms that she will be Rinaldo's bride when Jerusalem falls. Almirena urges Rinaldo to fight boldly and assure victory. As she departs, a herald announces the approach of Argante from the city. Eustazio surmises that the king fears defeat; this seems to be confirmed when Argante, after a grandiose entrance, requests a three-day truce to which Goffredo graciously assents. After Goffredo leaves, Argante ponders his love for Armida, the Queen of Damascus who is also a powerful sorceress, and considers the help her powers might bring him. As he muses, Armida arrives from the sky in a fiery chariot. She has divined that the Saracens' only chance of victory lies in vanquishing Rinaldo, and has the power, she claims, to achieve this.

The scene changes to a garden, with fountains and birds, where Rinaldo and Almirena are celebrating their love. They are interrupted as Armida appears, and wrests Almirena from Rinaldo's embrace. Rinaldo draws his sword to defend his lover, but a black cloud descends to envelop Armida and Almirena, and they are borne away. Rinaldo mourns the loss of his loved one. When Goffredo and Eustazio arrive they comfort Rinaldo, and propose they visit a Christian magician who may have the power to save Almirena. Rinaldo, left alone, prays for strength.

=== Act 2 ===
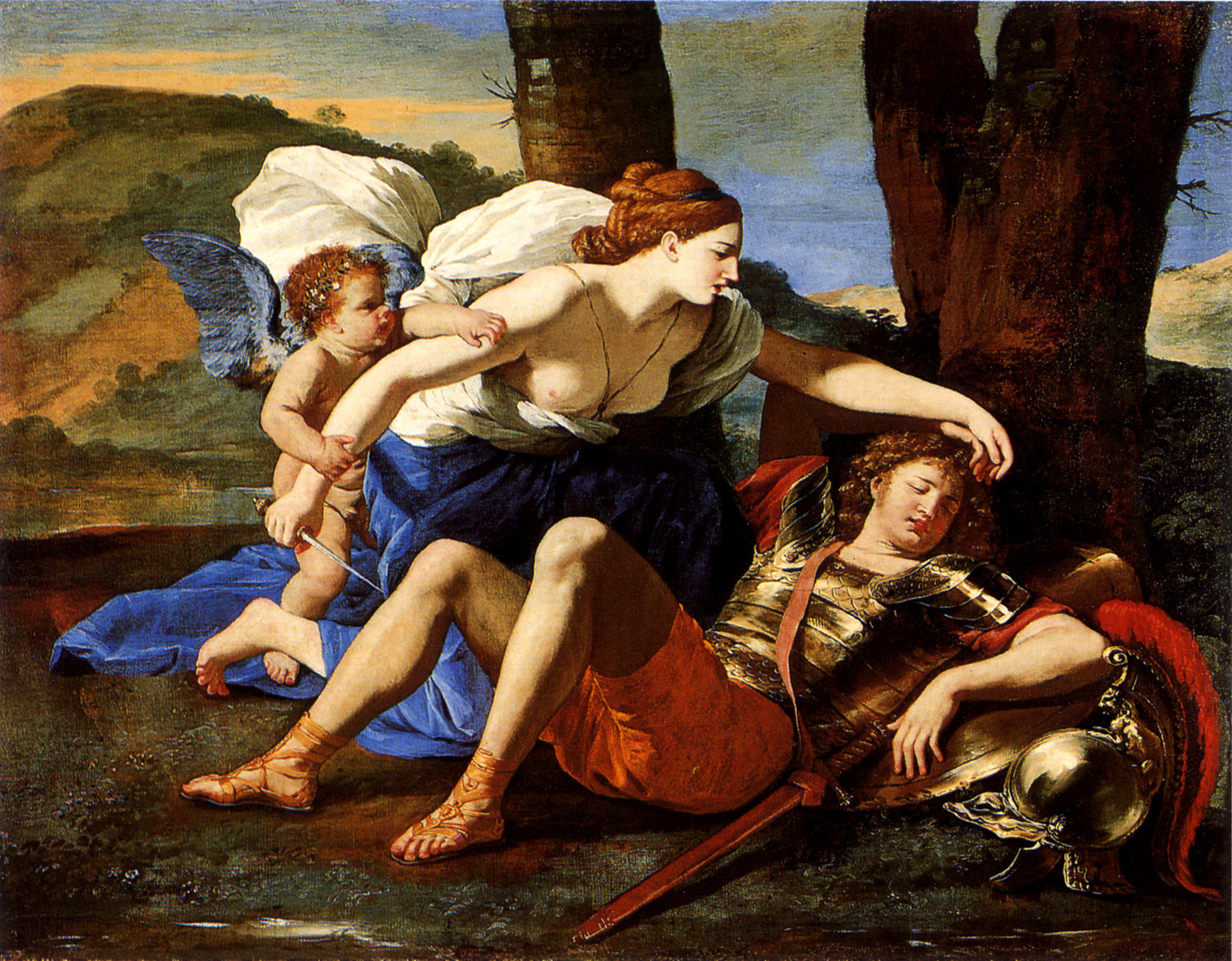
Armida falls in love with Rinaldo. 1616 painting by Nicolas Poussin.

A sea shore. As Goffredo, Eustazio and Rinaldo near the magician's lair, a beautiful woman calls from her boat, promising Rinaldo that she can take him to Almirena. Two mermaids sing of love's delights, and urge Rinaldo to go in the boat. He hesitates, unsure what to do, and his companions attempt to restrain him. Angry at the abduction of his loved one, Rinaldo enters the boat, which immediately sails off. Goffredo and Eustazio are shocked at Rinaldo's impulsiveness and believe that he has deserted their cause.

In Armida's palace garden, Almirena mourns her captivity. Argante joins her and, overcome by her beauty, confesses that he now loves her. He promises that as proof of his feelings he will defy Armida's wrath and secure Almirena's freedom. Meanwhile, Rinaldo is brought before the triumphant Armida. As he demands that Almirena be set free, Armida finds herself drawn to his noble spirit, and declares her love. When he angrily rejects her she uses her powers to assume Almirena's form, but Rinaldo suspects trickery, and departs. Armida, resuming her own appearance, is furious at her rejection yet retains feelings of tender love. She decides on another attempt to ensnare Rinaldo, and transforms herself back into Almirena's shape, but then encounters Argante. Believing her to be Almirena, Argante repeats his earlier promises of love and freedom. Swiftly resuming her own form, Armida denounces his infidelity and vows vengeance. Argante defiantly confirms his love for Almirena and declares that he no longer needs Armida's help. She departs in a fury.

=== Act 3 ===
A mountainside, at the magician's cavern. Goffredo and Eustazio are told by the Magician that Almirena is being held captive in Armida's palace at the mountain-top. Ignoring the magician's warning that they will need special powers, the pair set off for the palace but are quickly driven back by Armida's monsters. The magician then gives them magic wands that transcend Armida's power, and they set off again. This time they overcome the monsters, but as they reach the gates of the palace it disappears, leaving them clinging to a rock in the midst of a stormy sea. They climb the rock and descend out of sight.

In the palace garden Armida prepares to kill Almirena. Rinaldo draws his sword, but Armida is protected from his wrath by spirits. Suddenly Goffredo and Eustazio arrive, but as they touch the garden with their wands it disappears, leaving them all on an empty plain with the city of Jerusalem visible in the distance. Armida, after a last attempt to kill Almirena, also disappears as Rinaldo strikes her with his sword. The remaining four celebrate their reunion, while Goffredo announces that the attack on Jerusalem will begin the next day.

In the city, Argante and Armida, in danger from a common enemy, become reconciled and prepare their troops for battle. Goffredo's army advances, and battle finally commences. After a struggle for supremacy, Jerusalem falls to Goffredo; Argante is overcome and captured by Rinaldo, while Armida is taken by Eustazio. Rinaldo and Almirena celebrate their love and forthcoming marriage. Armida, accepting her defeat, breaks the wand which is the source of her evil power and together with Argante embraces Christianity. Goffredo expresses his forgiveness to his beaten foes and sets them free, before victors and vanquished join in a chorus of reconciliation.

=== Revisions, 1717 and 1731 ===
The opera was frequently revised, most particularly in 1717 and in 1731; modern performances are usually a conflation of the versions available. Up to and including 1717, these changes had no significant effect on the plot. In the 1731 version, however, in act 2 Armida imitates Almirena's voice rather than assuming her appearance, and Argante declares his love to Almirena's portrait rather than to her face. In act 3 the marches and the battle scene are cut; Armida and Argante remain unrepentant and vanish in a chariot drawn by dragons before the conclusion.

== Compositional history ==
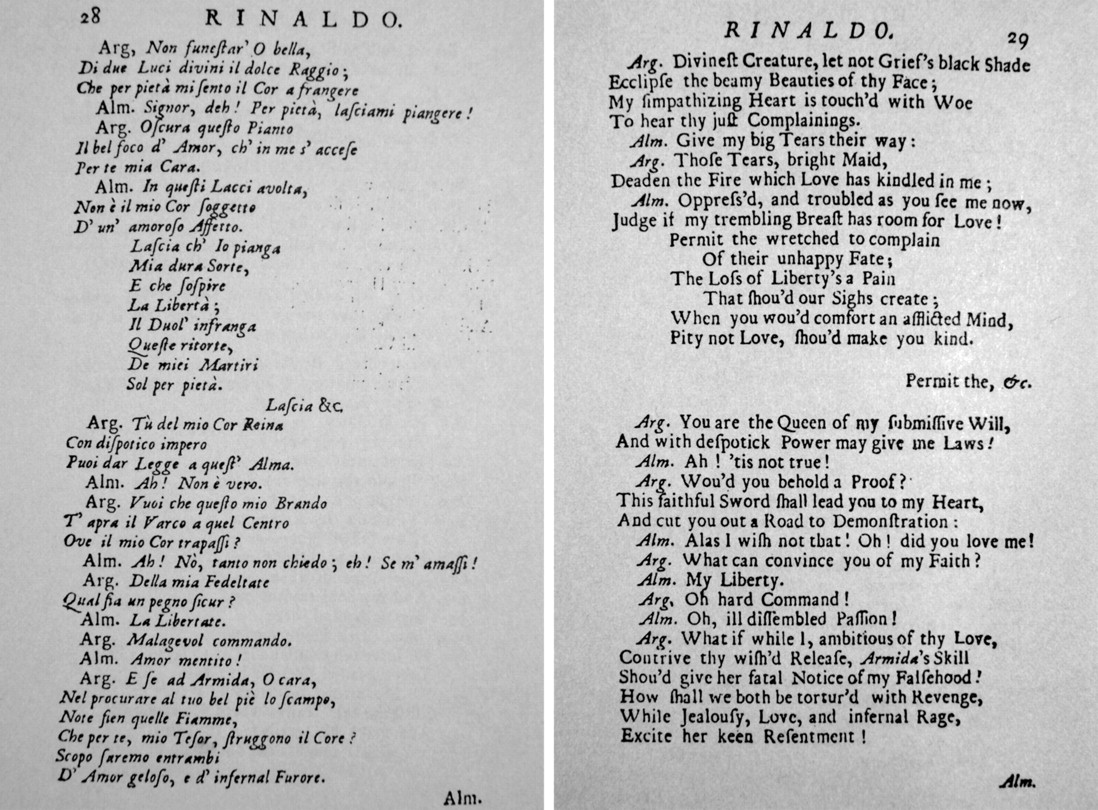
Pages from the 1711 libretto; Italian on the left, Aaron Hill's text on the right

In a letter dedicating the new opera to Queen Anne, Hill wrote of his choice of story: "I could not chuse a finer Subject than the celebrated story of Rinaldo and Armida". He had, however, exercised "a Poet's Privilege", to render Tasso's work suitable for the stage. This "privilege" moved the opera's story a long way from Tasso's original. Hill invented a new heroine, Almirena, to provide the main love interest with the hero Rinaldo, and the relationship between Rinaldo and Armida scarcely figures in the opera. Likewise, the affair between Argante and Armida is Hill's creation, as are the conversions to Christianity, the latter possibly a sop to English susceptibilities. Rossi was required to turn the elaborate scenario into verses, a relatively light task which, he said, was "the delivery of a few evenings". Nevertheless, Rossi complained that Handel hardly gave him time to write: "To my great wonder I saw an entire Opera set to music by that surprising genius, with the greatest degree of perfection, in two weeks". Price argues that Rossi's role was beyond that of a mere versifier, quoting Hill's words of praise for Rossi in the preface to the libretto, which suggest that Rossi was the senior partner in the birth of the libretto. Price also points to the likely influences on the structure of Rinaldo from two British semi-operas—George Granville's The British Enchanters, and Purcell's King Arthur. The transformations of characters to others' shapes, Price contends, is likely derived from John Dryden's play Amphitryon.

Handel's speed of composition was assisted by his inclusion of arias and other numbers from his earlier Italian works, among them "Bel piacere" and "Basta che sol" from Agrippina, "Sibillar gli angui" from the dramatic cantata Aci, Galatea e Polifemo, and the mermaids' song "Il vostro maggio" from the cantata Arresta il passo. Almirena's aria "Lascia ch'io pianga" had appeared in the oratorio Il trionfo del Tempo e del Disinganno. The suitability of some of these insertions has been questioned by later commentators; Dean and Knapp cite Argante's "Sibillar gli angui", with its references to the hissing snakes of Alecto and the howls of Scylla, as "ludicrously inappropriate" to accompany the king's grand act 1 entrance. Many other numbers—Dean and Knapp estimate two-thirds of the arias—were adapted and partly recomposed from earlier sources.

In the years between the 1711 premiere and the 1717 revival, Handel made various adjustments to the score and the vocal parts, often to accommodate the requirements of new singers. Details of these changes are difficult to establish since the performing librettos and scores for these years no longer exist. For 1717, more significant revisions were made; the role of Eustazio was merged with that of Goffredo, and Argante's part was rewritten to accommodate an alto voice. Thus in this revival all the principal parts were sung in high voice ranges. Handel's revisions for the 1731 revival were even more radical, since they not only affected individual musical numbers but involved alterations in the plot. The production was advertised "With New Scenes and Cloathes", but many of the changes involved reducing or eliminating the pyrotechnics and special effects that had characterised the original production. The only significant new music in the 1731 production is a long accompanied recitative for Rinaldo, though other numbers are changed or cut. Goffredo becomes a tenor, Armida a contralto, the Herald and the Magician become basses. Dean and Knapp summarise the 1731 revisions as "a striking illustration of the seeming vandalism with which Handel could treat his works in revival".

== Performance history and reception ==
=== Early performances ===
The 19th-century music critic George Hogarth wrote of Rinaldo that "[t]he romantic interest of the subject, the charms of the music, and the splendour of the spectacle, made it an object of general attraction". Its premiere at the Queen's Theatre on 24 February 1711, possibly under Handel's direction, was a triumphant success. A further 12 performances were immediately scheduled; at the end of the run, popular demand was such that two more were added. Notwithstanding this enthusiasm, the financial strains of such a grand production led to legal actions against Hill from unpaid craftsmen. Nine days after the premiere the Lord Chamberlain's Office revoked the impresario's licence. Under Hill's successors the opera was played at the theatre in most seasons until 1716–17, by which time it had totalled 47 performances, far more than any other opera at the Queen's.

The public's general enthusiasm for the opera was not shared by the writers Joseph Addison and Richard Steele, who used the pages of their new journal, The Spectator, to pour scorn and ridicule on the work. Addison may have been motivated by his own failure, a few years previously, to establish a school of English opera with Rosamund, on which he had collaborated with the composer Thomas Clayton. It was absurd, he wrote, that theatre audiences should be exposed to entire evenings of entertainment in a foreign tongue: "We no longer understand the language of our own stage". Addison did, however, praise the singing of Nicolò Grimaldi, the celebrated alto castrato known as "Nicolini", in the title role. Steele compared the production unfavourably to a Punch and Judy show, particularly criticising certain bungled scene changes and the poor quality of effects such as thunder and lightning. Hogarth made light of such comments: "Notwithstanding the influence which the Spectator influenced over the taste and manners of the age, its attacks ... seem to have had little effect in turning people from the entertainment".

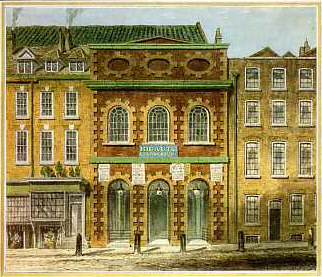
The opera house in the Haymarket – first known as the Queen's Theatre and then later as the King's Theatre – where many of Handel's works, including Rinaldo, were first performed

Some sources have suggested that the opera was performed in Dublin in March or April 1711, though according to Dean and Knapp there is no record of such an occasion. In November 1715 a version mainly in German was performed in Hamburg. This production, based on a translation by the playwright Barthold Feind, proved to be very popular and was revived in the city on numerous occasions during the 1720s. A pastiche of the opera, with additional numbers by Leonardo Leo, was presented by Leo at the Royal Court in Naples in 1718, with Nicolini singing his original role.

After 1716–17, Rinaldo was not seen on the London stage until 1731, when it was revived in its revised form at the King's Theatre. During these years Handel's industry was such that he was producing a new opera for this theatre every nine months. The 1731 production of Rinaldo received six performances, bringing the London total for the work to 53 in Handel's lifetime, the most for any of his operas. After 1731 Handel had fewer stage successes, and performances of his operas became rarer. Changes in taste and style combined, as Grout concludes, to "thrust [the operas] into ill-deserved oblivion", as a result of which Rinaldo was not staged anywhere for two hundred years.

=== Modern revivals ===
The first 20th-century production of Rinaldo which can be specifically verified was a performance in London, in February 1933, by pupils of the Hammersmith Day Continuation School, though Dean and Knapp mention a shortened version, in Czech, at the Prague Conservatory in 1923. The first modern professional performance was at the Halle Opera House in June 1954, under Horst-Tanu Margraf, as part of the Handel Festival. On 17 May 1961 the Handel Opera Society, directed by Charles Farncombe, staged the work at London's Sadler's Wells Theatre, a production that was revived four years later. The first American performance was a concert version at Carnegie Hall on 27 March 1972, given by the Handel Society of New York, with Stephen Simon conducting and Beverly Wolff as Rinaldo. The first staging of the opera in America was at the Houston Grand Opera under Lawrence Foster, in October 1975, with Marilyn Horne in the title role, a part with which she would become particularly associated on American stages.

In July 1982 Horne sang the part alongside John Alexander's Goffredo and Samuel Ramey's Argante, in a National Arts Centre (NAC) production in Ottawa directed by Frank Corsaro. The performance, with Mario Bernardi conducting the NAC Orchestra, was applauded by Montreal Gazette critic Eric McLean for its fine music making and its displays of "architectural and sartorial splendour". Eighteen months later, on 19 January 1984 Bernardi and Corsaro, with Horne, Ramey and Benita Valente from the Ottawa cast, brought the production to New York for the work's debut at the Metropolitan Opera. The production was loaned to the Met for its centennial season by the National Arts Centre of Canada "in deep appreciation of the many years during which Canadians have enjoyed opera from the Met – on tour, on radio and in New York". Donal Henahan in The New York Times praised all the singers in turn, with a special mention for Valente's "plaintive and affecting" rendering of the popular aria "Lascia ch'io pianga". But, says Henahan, "the loudest cheers of the night went at last to the choreographer, Eugene Collins, and an incredibly nimble corps of tumbling warriors". After ten performances at the Metropolitan Opera House the production was taken in May to Washington, D.C., and toured in the US before returning to New York in June for several outdoor performances.

From the mid-1980s onwards, performances of Rinaldo became more frequent worldwide. In June 1989 it was staged at La Fenice in Venice, under John Fisher, again with Marilyn Horne. This production was criticised by critic and music scholar Stanley Sadie, in his review of the live recording, for straying too far from the composer's original intentions, particularly in the rearrangement of material and the extent of cuts. Singers were, Sadie says, allowed too much freedom to ornament their vocal lines; some of the cadenzas were "preposterous". The opera reached Australia in 1999, at the Sydney Opera House under Patrick Summers, and was performed there again in July–August 2005 under Trevor Pinnock, with Michael Chance as Rinaldo. The new century saw a number of performances across Europe, including an appearance at the Göttingen International Handel Festival in 2004, with Nicholas McGegan conducting Concerto Köln. This production was well received by the public, but was criticised by Jochen Breiholz of Opera News for poor staging, indifferent singing and a substandard performance from the orchestra.

Zürich Opera's 2008 production, directed by Jens-Daniel Herzog and conducted by William Christie, threw aside all convention by representing the action in a 21st-century airport lounge and conference centre, with Rinaldo dressed in a double-breasted navy blazer and needing a drink. "Characters go up and down on-stage escalators, and the set spins to show various areas of the lounge and terminal. There is a dissection of a small, white furry animal, a large snake, some allusions to Bond girls and character transformations. The Christians pull guns on the Muslims at a signing ceremony". It was, wrote Associated Press critic Ronald Blum, "outrageous – and entertaining". A concert version of Rinaldo was given at the 2009 Edinburgh Festival, by the Bach Collegium Japan conducted by Masaaki Suzuki, with the Japanese soprano Maki Mori as Almirena.

During the opera's tercentenary year in 2011, the Glyndebourne Festival mounted a new production directed by Robert Carsen, designed by Gideon Davey, and conducted by Ottavio Dantone with the Orchestra of the Age of Enlightenment in the pit. The production is set in a school where Rinaldo is a student, initially the victim of bullying, who enters into the world of the Crusades. The Glyndebourne Festival Opera brought a semi-staged version of this production to the 2011 BBC Proms.

== Music ==
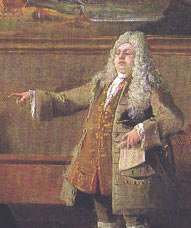
Detail from Marco Ricci's 1709 painting Rehearsal for an Opera. Ricci was a stage painter at the Queen's Theatre, and this singer is assumed to depict Nicolini, the house's principal alto castrato.

The amount of recycled music in Rinaldo is such that Dean and Knapp call it an "anthology" of the best works from Handel's Italian period. Sadie raises the question of whether the opera's dramaturgy is affected by the small amount of music written for its particular situations. He also comments on the problems raised for scholars by the extensive revisions to the music that took place during Handel's lifetime, but suggests that the available admixture creates interesting opportunities in the preparation of modern performing versions. The initial popular success of Rinaldo was assisted by the employment of virtuoso singers, in particular Nicolini in the title role. This part has remained in its original pitch, though in his various revisions Handel transposed the music of other leading roles to different voice types. Thus Goffredo had originally been an alto part, but in the 1717 revisions became a tenor; the Magician was transposed from alto castrato to bass, and Armida from soprano to contralto.

The music, Lang says, flows "beguilingly" from the spacious overture; the quieter, emotional passages are illustrated evocatively, while in the more spectacular moments Handel's innovative use of brass is exciting and inspiring. The sudden blast of trumpets which announces the march in act 3 provides, say Dean and Knapp, "an effect of splendour and exhilaration that time has not dimmed". The harpsichord solos which decorate "Vo' far guerra" in act 2 were originally improvised on the keyboard by Handel during performances, and were extremely popular. They were remembered and written down by William Babell, and published later as separate pieces. Lang believes that in spite of the borrowings, and the hasty manner in which the work was put together, Rinaldo is one of Handel's great operas. According to Dean and Knapp, no Italian opera heard in London to that point had been supported by such "majestic" orchestral forces. Critic Anthony Hicks describes the music, overall, as both "varied and excellent". Dean and Knapp's verdict is more equivocal. The music for the war and pageantry scenes, they say, is "brilliantly successful", but in depicting the scenes concerned with magic, Handel misses the mark; they suggest it was not until over 15 years later, with Admeto and Orlando, that he was able to represent the supernatural convincingly in music.

The opera begins in the key of F, and switches to G at the beginning of the grove scene in act 1. Act 2 starts in E minor and ends in G. The final act begins and ends in B minor. According to Hicks the dominant character musically, except in act 3 in which she barely sings, is Armida. Her entry cavatina "Furie terribili" gives, says Hicks, "an immediate impression of fiery passion", an energy and intensity demonstrated in her act 2 "Ah crudel", and in her later vengeance aria which is the occasion of Handel's harpsichord cadenzas. Armida's act 3 duet with Argante was the last duet with bass part that Handel wrote for 30 years. Of the other set pieces, Dean and Knapp highlight Rinaldo's "Cara sposa" as an example of Handel's growing confidence with aria forms. "Or la tromba" is praised for the brilliance of its orchestration: 4 trumpets, drums, strings & oboes—the only aria Handel ever wrote for this combination. The melody for Almirena's "Lascia ch'io pianga" began its life as an Asian dance in Almira before appearing as an aria in the oratorio Il trionfo. From this simple tune and plain accompaniment Handel achieves an "intensely moving effect" in this, the best-known of all the arias.

== Arias and other musical numbers ==
=== 1717 libretto and subsequent amendments ===
The main musical numbers from the 1711 libretto are listed, together with changes and replacements from the two major revisions of 1717 and 1731. Minor changes, transpositions, and alterations to recitative sections are not shown. New numbers introduced in 1717 and 1731 are listed separately. Other arias not listed may have been sung in Rinaldo during the years 1711–17, but in the absence of contemporary evidence from scores or librettos the extent of such changes cannot be accurately ascertained.

==== Act 1 ====
- Sinfonia (overture)
- "Sovra balze scoscesi e pungenti" (Goffredo)
- "Combatti da forte" (Almirena) (1731: replaced with "Quel cor che mi donasti")
- "Ogni indugio d'un amante" (Rinaldo)
- "Sulla ruota di fortuna" (Eustazio) (1717: cut; 1731: revived, amended and allocated to Argante)
- "Sibillar gli angui d'Aletto" (Argante) (1717: replaced with "Sorte amor vuol che quest'alma", which was cut in 1731)
- "No, no, che quest'alma" (Goffredo) (1731: replaced with "D'instabile fortuna")
- "Vieni o cara, a consolarmi" (Argante) (1731: replaced with amended "Sulla ruota di fortuna")
- "Furie terribili!" (Armida)
- "Molto voglio, molto spero" (Armida) (1731: replaced with a modified version of "Combatti da forte")
- "Augelletti, che cantate" (Almirena)
- "Scherzano sul tuo volto" (Duet: Almirena and Rinaldo)
- Sinfonia
- "Cara sposa, amante cara" (Rinaldo)
- "Cor ingrato, ti rammembri" (Rinaldo)
- "Col valor, colla virtù" (Eustazio) (1717: cut)
- Venti, turbini, prestate (Rinaldo)

==== Act 2 ====
- "Siam prossimi al porto" (Eustazio) (1717: cut; 1731: partly restored, sung by Goffredo)
- "Il vostro maggio" (Sirene)
- "Il tricerbero umiliato" (Rinaldo)
- "Mio cor, che mi sai dir?" (Goffredo)
- "Lascia ch'io pianga" (Almirena)
- "Basta che sol tu chieda" (Argante) (1717: replaced with "Ogni tua bella stilla" and in 1731 with "Per salvarti, idolo mio")
- "Fermati!/No, crudel!" (Duet, Armida and Rinaldo)
- "Abbrugio, avampo e fremo" (Rinaldo)
- "Dunque i lacci d'un volto" (Accompanied recitative, Armida)
- "Ah! crudel, Il pianto mio" (Armida)
- "Vo' far guerra, e vincer voglio" (Armida)

==== Act 3 ====
- Sinfonia
- "Andate, o forti" (Mago) (1717: cut; 1731: altered and restored)
- "Sorge nel petto" (Goffredo) (1717: cut)
- "È un incendio fra due venti" (Rinaldo)
- Marcia (Pagan march) (1731: cut)
- "Al trionfo del nostro furore" (Duet, Armida and Argante) (1731: repositioned, and sung by Goffredo and Almirena)
- "Bel piacere e godere" (Almirena)
- "Di Sion nell'alta sede" (Eustazio) (1717: sung by Goffredo; 1731: sung by Argante)
- Marcia (Christian march) (1731: cut)
- "Or la tromba in suon festante" (Rinaldo) (1731: cut)
- Battaglia (battle) (1731: cut)
- "Solo dal brando" (Goffredo) (1731; cut)
- "Vinto è sol della virtù" (Coro)

=== Additions and replacements, 1717 ===
- Act 1: "Sorte amor vuol che quest'alma" (Argante)
- Act 2: "Vieni, o caro, che senza il suo core" (Almirena)
- Act 2: "Ogni tua bella stilla" (Argante)
- Act 3: "Pregio è sol d'un alma forte" (Argante) (1731: cut)
- Act 3: "Si t'amo" (Almirena)

=== Additions and replacements, 1731 ===
- Act 1: "Quel cor che mi donasti" (Almirena)
- Act 1: "D'instabile fortuna" (Goffredo)
- Act 2: "Arma lo sguardo" (Armida)
- Act 2: "Per salvarti, idolo mio" (Argante)
- Act 3: "Orrori menzogneri" (accompanied recitative, Rinaldo)

== Editions ==
No complete autograph score exists; fragments representing about three-quarters of the 1711 score are held by the Royal Music Library (a subdivision of the British Library in London) and the Fitzwilliam Museum in Cambridge. The oldest complete score, dating from about 1716, is an error-strewn manuscript that may be a copy from one or more of the performing scores from that period. The manuscript bears numerous notes and corrections in Handel's hand, and was possibly the basis for the substantial revisions which he effected in 1731. It was also used by the copyist John Christopher Smith to produce two performing scores for the 1720s Hamburg performances. Further complete manuscript copies were produced by Smith and others in 1725–28 (the "Malmesbury" score), 1740 ("Lennard") and 1745 ("Granville"). These provide many variations of individual numbers.

During the initial run at the Queen's Theatre the publisher John Walsh printed Songs in the Opera of Rinaldo, in mainly short score form. Apart from the overture, instrumental numbers were omitted, as were the recitatives. In June 1711 Walsh published a fuller version, which included instrumental parts; he continued to publish versions of individual numbers, with a variety of orchestrations, until the 1730s. In 1717 William Babell issued an arrangement for harpsichord of the overture and seven of the arias. Friedrich Chrysander published editions of the whole opera in 1874 and in 1894, based on a study of the existing published and manuscript material. In 1993 David Kimbell, for the Hallische Händel-Ausgabe (HHA), produced a full score of the 1711 version, together with rejected draft material and the additional numbers introduced in revivals up to 1717. HHA has also produced a complete score of the 1731 version.

The libretto was published in London by the Queen's Theatre in February 1711, to coincide with the premiere, with Hill's English translation. Revised versions followed in 1717 and 1731 to reflect the changes introduced in those years; Rossi is believed to have prepared the Italian additions and revisions, with the 1731 English credited to "Mr. Humphreys". Feind's German versions of the libretto were published in Hamburg in 1715, 1723 and 1727.

== Recordings ==
The first full recording of Rinaldo (an "excerpts" disc had preceded it by two years) was made in 1977 by CBS, with Carolyn Watkinson in the title role, Ileana Cotrubaș as Almirena, and Jean-Claude Malgoire conducting La Grande Écurie et la Chambre du Roy. The work, recorded in a Paris church, was based on the 1711 score; Alan Blyth in Gramophone praised the standard of the singing, and despite reservations about the sound quality, called it one of the most enjoyable of available Handel opera recordings. There was no further recording of Rinaldo available until 1990, when John Fisher's heavily cut version from La Fenice was issued. Another decade passed before the appearance of Christopher Hogwood's 1999 Decca recording, again based on the original score, with the countertenor David Daniels as Rinaldo, Cecilia Bartoli as Almirena and Catherine Bott in the small part of First Mermaid. Gramophone's reviewer called this issue "a treat for Handel lovers – a rare recording of one of the composer's richest operas, with a strong and starry cast". Since then several more versions have been made available: Harry Bicket's 2001 recording for Arthaus, which was later issued as a DVD; René Jacobs with the Freiburg Baroque Orchestra for Harmonia Mundi in 2001; and a performance by the Aradia Ensemble under Kevin Mallon, recorded in 2004 and issued under the Naxos label in 2005.
