= Almahide =

Pasticcio opera arranged by John James Heidegger

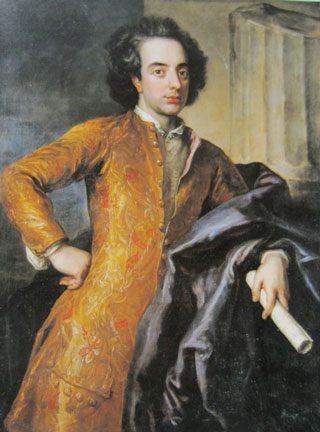
Giovanni Bononcini

Almahide is a pasticcio opera arranged by John James Heidegger. Musically the work was based on Ariosti’s Amor tra nemici (1708), but most of the arias were replaced by the work of other composers, including six arias from Giovanni Bononcini‘s Turno Aricino.

It is generally described as the first opera in London sung entirely in Italian, by Italian singers, although there were intermezzi in English between the acts of the main opera.

== Action ==
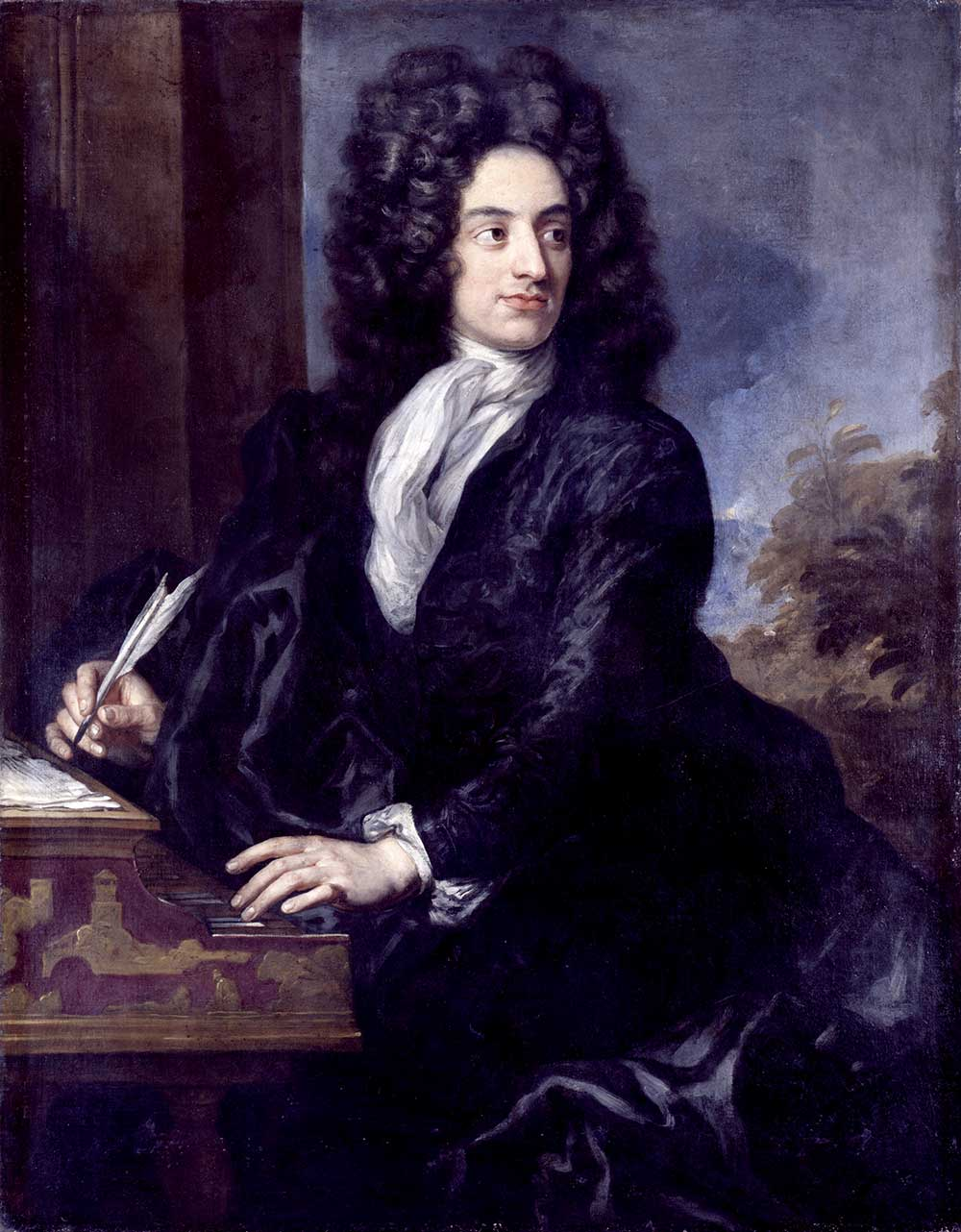
Attilio Ariosti

Almahide has been brought up as a man in preparation for killing her father's enemy Almiro; instead she has fallen in love with him. Almiro loves Celinda, who is herself loved by the king, Almanzor, but she loves the disguised Almahide. After scenes of jealousy and threats of violence, tensions are happily resolved with two marriages.

== Libretto ==
The libretto was by Silvio Stampiglia and Pietro Antonio Bernardon, who adapted Dryden’s Almanzor and Almahide. In the preface Heidegger explained that he had written the entire work in Italian to avoid having the cast singing in two languages (as they had done in recent productions of Camilla and Thomyris), and that he had translated the libretto back from Italian to English to allow audience understanding.

“Several People of Quality, and Encouragers of the Opera's, having found Fault with the Absurdity of those Scenes, where the Answers are made in English, to those that sing in Italian, and in Italian to those that recite in English; and it being impossible to have the whole Opera perform'd in English, because the chief Actors would not be able to perform their parts in our Language: I hope I shall be pardoned, if I have made all the Parts in Italian.”

== Production history ==
Almahide was first performed at Queen's Theatre, Haymarket on 10 January 1710. The first production was popular and had a run of fourteen nights. The cast was composed of Italian singers; three castrati - Nicolini (Almiro), Valentini (Almanzor), and Giuseppe Cassani (Gemir), as well as two women - Margherita de L'Epine (Almahide), and Isabella Girardeau (Celinda).

In February 1710, Walsh, Randall and Hare published Songs in the new Opera, Call’d Almahide, including the overture and 43 arias.

The production was revived the following year with four performances in April and one in May, with Margharita de l’Epine in the title role.
