= The Brook Street Band =

Music ensemble

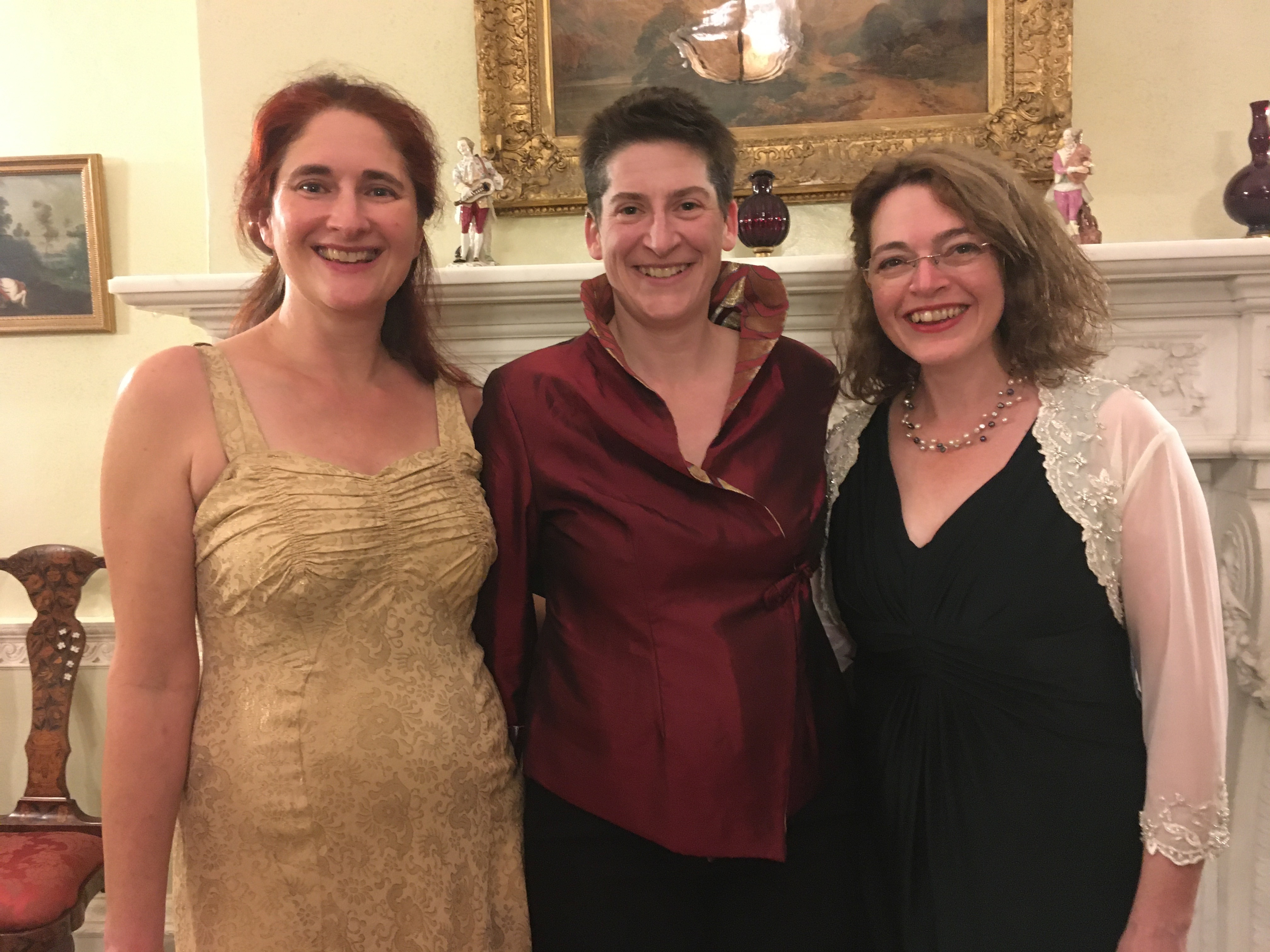
Tatty Theo, Rachel Harris and Carolyn Gibley at the Handeliade 2021

The Brook Street Band is a music ensemble playing on baroque instruments which takes its name from the London street where composer George Frideric Handel lived from 1723-1759. The Band was formed in 1996 by baroque cellist Tatty Theo to perform and record the chamber music of Handel and his contemporaries.

== History ==
The BSB was set up in 1996, with funds donated by William Pleeth and Margaret Good, cellist Theo’s maternal grandparents. Chamber music making had always been the driving passion in their musical careers and Pleeth and Good recognised the passion Theo had for it, and advised and enabled her to set up The Brook Street Band. The group took its name from Theo’s love for Handel’s music.

The Brook Street Band has become celebrated for its performances, not just of Handel’s music, but that of Johann Sebastian Bach's too. It has performed at many of the UK’s major chamber music venues, as well as at Early Music Festivals in the UK and Europe.

The Brook Street Band is a familiar group in the UK’s chamber music scene; from 1997 it has regularly performed for BBC Radio 3, from 1999 at the Dartington International Summer School, and from 2003 at Wigmore Hall.

The current core group members of The Brook Street Band are violinists Rachel Harris (1997-2000 and 2006- date) and Kathryn Parry (2018-date), flautist and recorder player Lisete da Silva Bull (2014-date), cellist Tatty Theo and harpsichordist Carolyn Gibley (1999-date).

Past group members have included violinists Marianna Szücs, Katalin Kertèsz and Farran Scott, and harpsichordists Steven Devine and Catherine Pierron.

The Brook Street Band regularly works as a chamber ensemble but often expands for orchestral work. Guest singers have regularly included soprano Nicki Kennedy and bass Matthew Brook.

The Brook Street Band started their own biennial "love:Handel" festival in 2017. The festival is based in Norwich in the Chapel and Princes Street URC.

== Recordings ==
- Handel Oxford Water Music AV0028 (2003)
- Handel Trio Sonatas Op 5 AV2068 (2005)
- Handel 'Cello' Sonatas AV2118 (2007)
- Handel English Cantatas AV2153 (2008)
- Bach Trio Sonatas AV2199 (2010)
- Handel Dixit Dominus AV2274 (2013) with Choir of Queen's College, Oxford
- Handel Trio Sonatas Op 2 AV2282 (2013)
- JS/CPE Bach Sonatas for viola da gamba and harpsichord AV2321 (2015)
- Handel Trio Sonatas for 2 violins and BC AV2357 (2016)
- Handel Sonatas for violin and BC AV2387 (2018)
- Arne The Judgement of Paris (opera) CDLX7361 (2019)
- Lampe The Dragon of Wantley (opera) 2022 conducted John Andrews
- Schütz - A German in Venice (with music by Schütz, Monteverdi, Cavalli, Grandi, Sances and Salomon Rossi) FHR145 (2024)
