= Gottfried Finger =

Moravian baroque composer and violoncellist (c1655-1730)

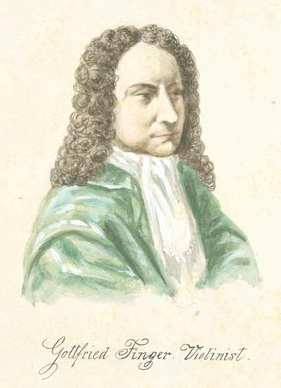
Portrait of Gottfried Finger

Gottfried Finger (c. 1655-56 – 31 August 1730), also Godfrey Finger, was a Moravian-German Baroque Kapellmeister and composer. He was also a virtuoso on the viol, and many of his compositions were for the instrument. He also wrote operas. Finger was born in Olomouc, modern-day Czech Republic, and worked for the court of James II of England before becoming a freelance composer. The fact that Finger owned a copy of the musical score of the work Chelys by the Flemish composer Carolus Hacquart suggests that the two composers may have worked together in England.

Intrada in A-Major for 2 Violas da Gamba from the Codex Sünchinger

Curiosa in D-Major for 2 Violas da Gamba from the Codex Sünchinger
Performed by ViolMedium – Eric Miller & Phillip W. Serna, Viols

After a contest in London to set William Congreve's The Judgement of Paris as an opera, in which Finger came in fourth place, he left England and moved to Germany. He died in Mannheim.

== Life ==
After musical training in his native town, Gottfried Finger came to the court of the Prince-Bishop of Olomouc, Karl II von Liechtenstein-Kastelkorn, and to Kroměříž, where his oldest known compositions are preserved. After working as a musician in Munich since 1682, he traveled to England, where he was accepted into the court chapel of King James II in 1685 and was known as Geoffrey Finger. In 1687, he here dedicated his op. 1 to the English king. After the King's exile in 1688, Finger began a period as a freelance musician and composer, during which he was one of the most important figures in London's musical life until 1701. He then became a chamber musician in Wrocław. After 1702 he worked as a chamber musician at the court in Berlin, and from 1707 as a member of the court chapel of the imperial governor in Innsbruck, of which he was concertmaster from 1708. Gottfried Finger presumably retained this position until his death, even when the court moved to Neuburg an der Donau in 1717, to Heidelberg in 1718 and to Mannheim in 1720. In 1723 he was still listed as a member of the Mannheim court chapel.

== Works (selection) ==
Frontispiece to Fingers Sonatae XII pro diversis instrumentis, Simon Gribelin, ca. 1688

Sonatae XII. for various instruments, three parts for violin & viola di gamba, three more for II violins & viola di basso, three consecutives for III violins, a reliquary for II violins & viola, all in continuo for organ and harp..., Opus 1, (Amsterdam, Estienne Roger around 1690)

Six Sonatas of two parts for two flutes..., Opus 2, (London, John Walsh & Joseph Hare around 1688)

Six sonatas à 2 flutes & 1 basse continue..., Opus 4, (Amsterdam, Estienne Roger around 1690)

10 Sonatas for three, two violins and cello or basso continuo, Opus 5, (Amsterdam, Estienne Roger around 1690)

7 sonatas for trumpet, oboe, bass and B.c.

7 suites for Baryton and B.c.

Overture to the serenade The Fifth Element (Heidelberg, 1718)

Opera; The Victory of Beauty over the Heroes (with Jean-Baptiste Volumier and Augustin Reinhard Stricker) (Berlin, 1706, lost)

Opera; Roxane and Alexander's Wedding (Berlin, 1708, lost)

== Literature ==
- Moritz Fürstenau: Finger, Gottfried. In: Allgemeine Deutsche Biographie (ADB). Band 7, Duncker & Humblot, Leipzig 1877, S. 16 f.
- Andrea Harrandt: Finger, Gottfried (Godfrey). In: Oesterreichisches Musiklexikon. Online-Ausgabe, Wien 2002 ff., ISBN 978-3-7001-3077-2; Druckausgabe: Band 1, Verlag der Österreichischen Akademie der Wissenschaften, Wien 2002, ISBN 978-3-7001-3043-7.
- Thomas Hochradner: Gottfried Fingers „Sonata à. 6. Instrumenti“. In: Schläft ein Lied in allen Dingen. Festschrift für Konrad Ruhland zum 70. Geburtstag. Herausgegeben von Joseph Bader und Georg Ruhland. Passau/Schongau 2003, ISBN 978-3-00-012495-2, S. 153–160.
- Kathryn Lowerre: Music and Musicians on the London Stage, 1695–1705. (= Performance in the Long Eighteenth Century: Studies in Theatre, Music, Dance). Ashgate, Farnham und Burlington 2009, ISBN 978-0-7546-6614-1.
- Kathryn Lowerre (Hrsg.): The Lively Arts of the London Stage, 1675–1725. (= Performance in the Long Eighteenth Century: Studies in Theatre, Music, Dance). Ashgate, Farnham und Burlington 2014, ISBN 978-1-4094-5533-2.
- Robert Münster: Gottfried Finger. In: Neue Deutsche Biographie (NDB). Band 5, Duncker & Humblot, Berlin 1961, ISBN 978-3-428-00186-6, S. 159 (Digitalisat).
- Robert Rawson: Liste zahlreicher Veröffentlichungen des Musikwissenschaftlers über Fingers Leben und Werk
- Heribert Sturm: Biographisches Lexikon zur Geschichte der böhmischen Länder. Herausgegeben im Auftrag des Collegium Carolinum (Institut), Bd. 1, R. Oldenbourg Verlag München Wien 1979, S. 349, ISBN 978-3-486-49491-4, mit weiteren Literaturhinweisen
