= The Triumph of Time and Truth =

Oratorio by Georg Friedrich Händel

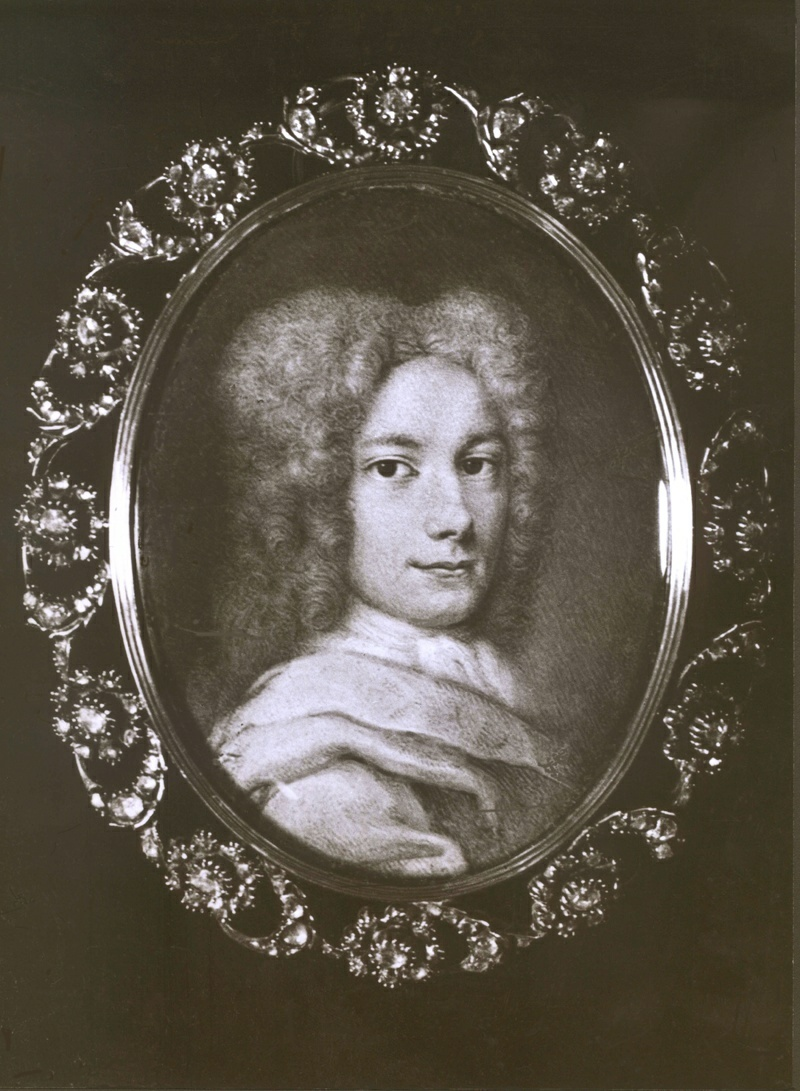
Händel c. 1710

The Triumph of Time and Truth is the final name of an oratorio by George Frideric Handel produced in three different versions across fifty years of the composer’s career:

== Il trionfo del Tempo e del Disinganno (The Triumph of Time and Disillusion), HWV 46a ==
Handel’s very first oratorio, composed in spring 1707, to an Italian-language libretto by Cardinal Benedetto Pamphili. Time and Disillusion are personified (thus spelled with an initial capital even in Italian). Comprising two sections, the oratorio was premiered that summer in Rome. One of its famous arias is Lascia la spina, cogli la rosa (Leave the Thorn, Take the Rose), later recast as "Lascia ch'io pianga" (Leave Me to Weep) in the opera Rinaldo and for Pena Tiranna in Amadigi di Gaula.

== Il trionfo del Tempo e della Verità (The Triumph of Time and Truth), HWV 46b ==
Revised and expanded into three sections in March 1737, the work also had its name adjusted. Handel was by that time living in England and producing seasons of English-language oratorio and Italian opera. This version premiered on March 23, received three more performances the next month, and was revived on one date in 1739.

== The Triumph of Time and Truth, HWV 71 ==
In March 1757, possibly without much involvement from the blind and aging Handel, the oratorio was further expanded and revised. The libretto was reworked into English, probably by the composer’s prolific last librettist, Thomas Morell, while John Christopher Smith Jr. probably assembled the score. Although Jephtha (1751) is considered the composer’s true last oratorio, this third version of Il trionfo comes later. Isabella Young sang the role of Counsel (Truth) at the premiere.
