= Francesco Mancini (composer) =

Italian composer

Francesco Mancini (16 January 1672 – 22 September 1737) was a Neapolitan composer of considerable notoriety during his time as a prolific member of the Neapolitan School, and aided in the establishment of a local practice there. His contribution to the development of Italian opera, a particularly intrinsic aspect of the Neapolitan School as a whole, is especially lauded, as well as his writings of sacred works and cantatas. His name can be found in historical sources being lauded with other members like Nicola Porpora, Alessandro Scarlatti, and Giovanni Battista Pergolesi.

== Career ==
He was an important teacher and managed to obtain his greatest duty during Alessandro Scarlatti's absence from the Neapolitan court, between 1702 and 1708. In this period, he was Director of the Conservatorio di S Maria di Loreto from his predecessor Giuliano Perugino, composing the opera, Il zelo animato there (1733), as well as being first organist and maestro of the Capella Reale. This time has been segmented by scholars into two parts: his opera phase (1707-1713) and his sacred music phase (1716-1720). His assistant while as Reale was Giuseppe Porsile. In 1735, Mancini was forced to conclude his participation at the Conservatory due to issues with his well-being, the substitute in his absence being Giovanni Fischietti.

== Works ==
His works include 29 operas (including L’Idaspe fedele, performed in London in 1710), sonatas, 7 serenatas, 12 oratorios and more than 200 secular cantatas in addition to assorted sacred music and a small amount of instrumental music. Today, he is best known for his recorder sonatas. Mancini was also well respected within his cultural milieu outside of purely music, and as such, as in the case of poet Aurora Sanseverino, he was called upon for commissions. He also benefited from the distribution of his works outside of Italy thanks to printed collections made by European publishers at the time, one of them being the French printer Michel-Charles Le Cène.

== Recordings ==
- Missa Septimus SSATB [25'46"]. Currende, cond. Erik Van Nevel. KTC4031
