= Early Opera Company =

The Early Opera Company is a British ensemble dedicated to the performance of baroque operas using period instruments.

== Background ==
The company was founded in 1994 by Christian Curnyn. Handel's operas feature prominently in its repertoire, and the Company has given notable performances of Acis and Galatea, Dido and Aeneas, Agrippina in New York, Orlando at the South Bank Centre Early Music Festival and Partenope at the Linbury Studio Theatre. They have also recorded Partenope and Semele for the Chaconne label on Chandos Records. The recording of Semele was awarded the Handel Prize in 2008. Soloists who have performed with the company include Joshua Bell, Sam Haywood and Jonathan Biss. They performed at the Lufthansa Baroque Music Festival, in May 2009, with John Eccles's The Judgment of Paris in one of its first performances. The ensemble also made the premiere recording of the work for Chandos Records.
