= Nicolò Grimaldi =

Italian opera singer

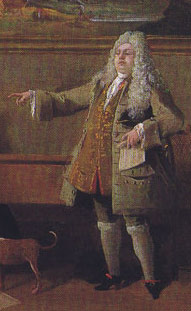
Nicolini, by Marco Ricci

Nicolò Francesco Leonardo Grimaldi (5 April 1673 (bap) – 1 January 1732) was an Italian mezzo-soprano castrato who is best remembered today for his association with the composer George Frideric Handel, in two of whose early operas he sang. Grimaldi was usually known by his stage name of Nicolini.

Nicolini was born in Naples, where he made his operatic début in 1685. He also sang sacred music as a soprano in the Cathedral and Royal Chapel (to which extant libretti from the 1690s identify him as virtuoso). Between 1697 and 1731 he sang many operatic roles at various Italian cities in works by composers such as Alessandro Scarlatti, Nicola Porpora, Leonardo Vinci, and Johann Adolph Hasse. Other composers who wrote major roles for him included Francesco Provenzale (who was his teacher), Pollarolo, Ariosti, Lotti, Giovanni and Antonio Maria Bononcini, Caldara, Albinoni, Leo, and Riccardo Broschi. Of more than a hundred productions in which he took part, thirty-six were in Naples, thirty-four in Venice, and fifteen in London.

Nicolini first visited London in 1708, where his fine singing and critically renowned acting were crucial to the success of Italian opera, and, more specifically, opera seria in London. In 1711 he created the title role in Handel's Rinaldo, a work whose immediate popularity was instrumental in establishing Handel's lengthy career in England. He also sang the title role in Handel's Amadigi in 1715 and continued to sing in London, usually in various pasticcio, until 1717. The eighteenth-century musicologist Charles Burney described Nicolini as "this great singer, and still greater actor", while Joseph Addison labelled him "the greatest performer in dramatic Music that is now living or that perhaps ever appeared on a stage". His Handel roles reveal that he possessed exceptional vocal agility and virtuosity. Between 1727–1730 he performed with Farinelli in Italy. In 1731 he planned to sing at Naples in Giovanni Battista Pergolesi's first opera seria, La Salustia, but became ill and died during rehearsals.
