= J. Merrill Knapp =

American musicologist and academic

John Merrill Knapp (May 9, 1914 – March 7, 1993) was an American musicologist and academic. He was considered an authority on the life and works of George Frideric Handel. Born in New York City, Knapp graduated from the Hotchkiss School before entering Yale University where he earned a Bachelor of Arts in 1936 and was a member of Skull and Bones. He then taught briefly at The Thacher School in Ojai, California before returning to Yale to assume the post of assistant director of the Yale Glee Club. He left there to pursue graduate studies at Columbia University where he earned a Master of Music degree. He served as an operations officer in the Third Fleet of United States Navy during World War II (1942-1946); earning two service stars and a commendation ribbon.

In 1946 Knapp was hired as a music instructor at Princeton University. He remained at Princeton for the next 36 years, working as an assistant professor (1947-1953), associate professor (1953-1961), and full professor (1961-1982). He was chairman of Princeton's music department from 1949-1951, and served as Dean of the whole college from 1961-1966. He served as director of the Princeton Glee Club from 1941-1943 and 1946-1952. Upon his retirement in 1982 he was named a professor emeritus of music at Princeton. He died of prostate cancer in 1993 at Princeton Medical Center.
