= Winton Dean =

English musicologist

Winton Basil Dean (18 March 1916 – 19 December 2013) was an English musicologist of the 20th century, most famous for his research on the life and works—in particular the operas and oratorios—of George Frideric Handel, as detailed in his book Handel's Dramatic Oratorios and Masques (1959).

Dean was born in Birkenhead in March 1916, the son of the film and theatre producer Basil Dean. He was educated at Harrow and King's College, Cambridge, where he took part in stagings of Handel oratorios in the 1930s.

After World War II, he became notable as a writer on music, particularly when he published several articles about the compositions of Bizet, starting with La Coupe du roi de Thulé in Music & Letters in 1947. He considerably rewrote his 1948 book on Bizet in 1965 due to new material and music of the composer which had since emerged. From 1965 he wrote articles criticizing the Oeser edition of Carmen, listing many mistakes, describing it as "a musicological disaster of the first magnitude", and continued to point out its errors in reviews of subsequent performances and recordings. In the 1954 Grove he contributed an extended essay on 'criticism', ending with a long list of the necessary qualifications for a critic.

However, Handel became his main focus; and apart from the book already mentioned, he also published Handel and the Opera Seria (Berkeley, 1969), and a more general Essays on Opera (Oxford, 1990, 2/1993). His definitive two-volume work on Handel operas was published in 1987 and 2006, and set new standards in Handel scholarship and did much to help the revival of stagings of Handel's operas.

Dean contributed heavily to a number of musicological publications, including The Musical Times and Opera, as well as to The Listener and record sleeve notes. His writings include studies of French opera, and also Italian opera before the dominance of Verdi. His reputation rests principally upon his analyses of Handel's output, and Handel’s Dramatic Oratorios and Masques is widely acknowledged as a seminal work not only in Handel scholarship but also in musicology as a whole, thanks to its detailed discussion of original documents and thorough approach to the topic. He died in Hambledon, Surrey in December 2013 at the age of 97.

== Major publications ==
- Dean, Winton (1959), Handel's Dramatic Oratorios and Masques, London: Oxford University Press, ISBN 978-0-19-315203-8, OCLC 269174
- —— (1975), Bizet, J. M. Dent & Sons, ISBN 978-0-460-03163-9
- ——; Knapp, J Merrill (1987), Handel's operas: 1704–1726, Oxford University Press, ISBN 978-0-19-315219-9
- —— (1990), Essays on Opera, Oxford University Press, ISBN 978-0-19-315265-6
- —— (2006), Handel's Operas, 1726-1741, Boydell Press, ISBN 978-1-84383-268-3
