= Catone (Handel) =

Opera by George Frideric Handel

- Opera by George Frideric Handel
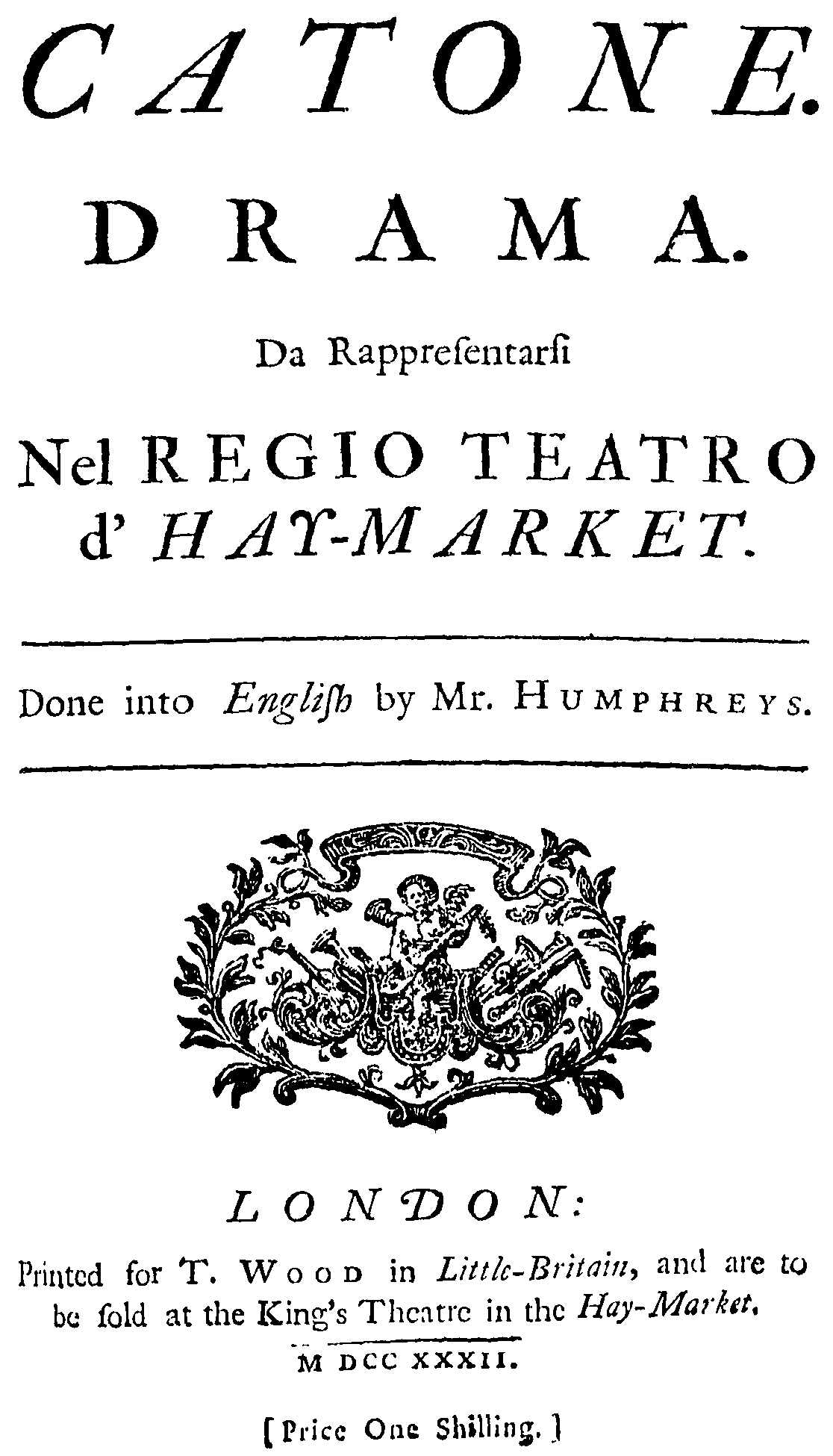
- Title page of the libretto, 1732
- Librettist: after Pietro Metastasio
- Language: Italian
- Premiere: 4 November 1732; The King's Theatre at the Haymarket (London)

Catone (Cato, HWV A7) is an Italian opera by George Frideric Handel. It is one of Handel's nine pasticcio works made up of music and arias by other composers than him. The opera was first performed at the King's Theatre, Haymarket, London, on 4 November 1732.

== Libretto ==
The libretto was written by Metastasio.

A first version of his libretto was set to music by Leonardo Vinci whose opera premiered in Rome on 19 January 1728. However, Metastasio's Catone in Utica was initially received with mixed feelings. While Naples's audiences had just accepted Dido's death in the flames at the end of Didone abbandonata (1724), Rome's were unwilling to watch Cato's agonizingly slow death which spanned the last two scenes of the opera, and unwilling to do without the expected "lieto fine". Neither were they impressed by the scene set in a disused sewer. Metastasio therefore revised his libretto (in particular the last act). In this second version Cato's death is simply reported and all that remains of the "acquedotti antichi" is the entrance to it, with a fountain dedicated to the goddess Isis. This second version was set to music by Leo, whose opera premiered on 26 December 1728 in Venice.

Handel's Catone is primarily based on Leo's opera, and therefore on the second version of the libretto, to which further cuts and adjustments were made. For instance, the character of Fulvio is completely edited out in Handel's version.

=== Synopsis ===
The subject of the opera, set in Utica, is the suicide of Cato the Younger (95 BC – April 46 BC) as he refuses to submit to Cesar.

Cesar has crossed the Rubicon and taken over the power of Rome by force. Cato, fervent champion of the republic, fled to Utica after the defeat and death of Pompey, his ally against Cesar. Despite his overwhelming military superiority, Cesar tries to win Cato as a friend; his marriage to Cato's daughter Marzia, who secretly loves him, might win Cato over. However, Cato has already promised Marzia to the Numidian prince Arbace. Emilia, widow of Cato's late-ally Pompey, also intrigues against Marzia's marriage to Cesar. Cato, unable to give up his law-abiding principles and seeing no way out of his face-off with Cesar, commits suicide in accordance with his Stoic philosophy.

== Cast ==
Roles, voice types, premiere cast
Role	Description	Voice type	Premiere cast, 2 November 1732
Catone	Cato the Younger	contralto castrato	Senesino
Marzia	Daughter of Catone, secretly in love with Cesare	soprano	Signora Strada
Emilia	Widow of Pompeo	soprano	Signora Celeste Gismondi
Arbace	Prince of Numidia, friend of Catone and lover of Marzia	contralto	Signora Bertolli
Cesare	Julius Caesar	bass	Montagnana

== Music ==
The surviving London score of Handel's arrangement, now in the Staats- und Universitätsbibliothek Hamburg collection, is clearly based on a London copy of Leo's opera, confirming that Handel used Leo's opera as a starting point. This London copy of Leo's Catone in Utica, now in the possession of the Royal Academy of Music, was originally owned by Sir John Buckworth.

Sir John Buckworth was one of the directors of the Royal Academy in 1726 and a member of the directorate of the Opera of the Nobility in 1733, and would have known Handel. He also happens to be the dedicatee of Porpora's Semiramide which, just like Leo's Catone, was premiered at the Teatro San Giovanni Grisostomo (Venice) during the 1728–29 season. Buckworth also owned a copy of Porpora's Semiramide. He could have brought it back with him from Italy along with the copy of Leo's Catone.

However, Handel also travelled to Italy during that season to recruit new singers for London. Therefore, he could have come across Leo's Catone in Utica when it was performed there and he could have taken the music back to England with him.

In any case, whether brought back to London by Handel or Buckworth, the London copy of Leo's Catone in Utica, contains Handel's pencilled notes relating to cuts and changes made in the recitatives and to the elimination of the role of Fulvio.

From Leo's score, Handel has kept essential parts of the recitatives, the overture, a sinfonia from the ritornello of the choir "Gia il mondo ti cede intero" and nine arias (originally 12 arias were kept, but 3 were later also removed). The rest, however, was swapped for arias by Hasse, Porpora and Vinci, three of the most fashionable opera composers of the time.

Handel's Catone also includes a couple of arias – maybe three – by Vivaldi.

Handel's artistic involvement in Catone is disputed. On the one hand, as several of the singers Handel worked with in London had previously sung Hasse's, Porpora's and Vinci's music, these swaps may have been arie di baule or, at least, arias taken from the singers' repertoires, rather than creative choices made by Handel (who is thought by some to have solely reshaped the recitatives and transposed arias by other composers). For instance, Cesare's arias "Non paventa del mar le procelle", taken out of Porpora's 1730 Siface, and "È ver che all'amo intorno", taken out of Porpora's 1731 Poro, were both already sung by Montagnana in Porpora's original productions.

On the other hand, Handel's arrangement of Catone might provide a prime example of how he addressed the characterisation of the roles, both musically and dramatically. The drastic reduction of the long recitatives might have been indispensable for the London audience. The technical possibilities, the voice range and the artistic and creative possibilities of the singers would have influenced the selection of arias. But, although he was opposed to them for the sake of drama, Handel also had to adhere to a number of conventions, such as the distinction between first, second and third roles and the position of each singer in the opera company (reflected in the amount of their respective fee), all of which would have influenced the musical structure, as well as the number, type and position of each singer's aria. The bass Montagnana, for example, was an exceptional singer and Handel could not possibly expect him to accept a minor role. Therefore, the role of Cesar, that Leo had originally written for the soprano Domenico Gizzi, was given to him and consequently showcase arias for bass had to be inserted. The role of Arbace, which Leo wrote for Farinelli, was reduced to the point of being unrecognizable, Francesca Bertolli being unable to sing the original arias. Celeste Gismondi seems to have only sung arias she had already proven herself with. And, even though Anna Maria Strada could easily take on Lucia Facchinelli's prima donna part, she was still given an additional aria (Carestini's well-known showcase "Vo solcando un mar crudele" from Vinci's Artaserse), a choice which weakens the ending of the opera both dramatically and musically. (The end in Leo's opera, focuses on Cesare, who, though victorious in the battle, acclaims the moral victory of his opponent Cato and his suicide, and angrily throws down his own laurels and storms out of stage.)

Finally, Handel, obviously concerned with showcasing the new vocal stars of his opera company to the London public (especially at the beginning of the season), might have approved or made aria choices, that, if not relevant from a dramatic point of view, would have made sense commercially.

Scholars have suggested that the sinfonia (overture) and at least two arias of Leo's original work may be spurious.

=== Arias ===
Pasticcio aria	Pasticcio singer	Composer	Original opera	Original aria	Original singer
"Con sì bel nome in fronte" (Catone)	Senesino	Leo	Catone in Utica (1728)	"Con sì bel nome in fronte" (Catone), act 1, sc.1	Nicolò Grimaldi
"Non ti minaccio sdegno" (Marzia)	Anna Maria Strada	Leo	Catone in Utica (1728)	"Non ti minaccio sdegno" (Marzia), act 1, sc.2	Lucia Fachinelli
"Un raggio di speme" (Arbace)	Francesca Bertolli	Hasse	Dalisa (1730)	"Un raggio di stella" (Enrico), act 3, sc.3	Antonio Pasi
"Pensa di chi sei figlia" (Catone)	Senesino	Leo	Catone in Utica (1728)	"Pensa di chi sei figlia" (Catone), act 1, sc.5	Nicolò Grimaldi
"Non paventa del mar le procelle" (Cesare)	Montagnana	Porpora	Siface (1730)	"Non paventa del mar le procelle" (Libanio), act 1, sc.10	Montagnana
"Priva del caro sposo" (Emilia)	Celeste Gismondi	Porpora	Germanico in Germania (1732)	"Priva del caro sposo" (Rosmonda), act 2, sc.9	Angelo Maria Monticelli
"Vaghe labbra voi fingete"" (Emilia)	Celeste Gismondi	Hasse	Ulderica (1729)	"Vaghe labbra voi ridete" (Roderico), act 2, sc.6	Carestini
"È follia se nascondete" (Marzia)	Anna Maria Strada	Leo	Catone in Utica (1728)	"È follia se nascondete" (Marzia), act 1, sc.15	Lucia Fachinelli
"Mi conosci e sai chi sono?" (Catone)	Senesino	Leo	Catone in Utica (1728)	Mi conosci e sai chi sono?" (Catone), act 2, sc.2	Nicolò Grimaldi
"Vaghe luci, luci belle" (Arbace)	Francesca Bertolli	Vivaldi	Ipermestra (1727)	"Vaghe luci, luci belle" (Linceo), act 1, sc.1	Lucia Lanzetti
"Agitato da più venti" (Cesare)	Montagnana	?	?	?	?
"So che nascondi" (Cesare)	Montagnana	Vivaldi	Orlando Furioso (1727)	"Benché nasconda" (Astolfo), act 2, sc.2	Gaetano Pinetti
"Dovea svenarti all'ora" (Catone)	Senesino	Leo	Catone in Utica (1728)	"Dovea svenarti all'ora" (Catone), act 2, sc.13	Nicolò Grimaldi
"Fra tanti pensieri" (Emilia)	Celeste Gismondi	Hasse	Demetrio (1732)	"Fra tanti pensieri" (Cleonice), act 1, sc.3	Bordoni-Hasse
"Confusa, smarrita spiegarti vorrei" (Marzia)	Anna Maria Strada	Leo	Catone in Utica (1728)	"Confusa, smarrita spiegarti vorrei" (Marzia), act 3, sc.2	Lucia Fachinelli
"Quando piomba improvvisa saetta" (Arbace)	Francesca Bertolli	Porpora	Poro (1731)	"Quando piomba improvvisa saetta" (Gandarte), act 2, sc.15	Anna Bagnolesi
"È ver che all'amo intorno" (Cesare)	Montagnana	Porpora	Poro (1731)	"È ver che all'amo intorno" (Timagene), act 2, sc.10	Montagnana
"Vede il nocchier la sponda" (Emilia)	Celeste Gismondi	Hasse	Euristero (1732)	"Vede il nocchier la sponda" (Ormonte), act 2, sc.10	Caffarelli
"Per darvi alcun pegno" (Catone)	Senesino	Leo	Catone in Utica (1728)	"Per darvi alcun pegno" (Catone), act 3, sc.12	Nicolò Grimaldi
"Vo solcando un mar crudele" (Marzia)	Anna Maria Strada	Vinci	Artaserse (1730)	"Vo solcando un mar crudele" (Arbace), act 1, sc.15	Carestini

== Reception ==
The opera was only performed five times, on 4, 7 11, 14 and 18 November 1732.

The Daily Advertiser from 6 November 1732 reports that:

There were present a very numerous Audience; and Signora Celeste Gismondi, who lately arriv'd here, perform'd a principal Part in it with universal Applause. We hear that this Opera was not compos'd by Mr Handell, but by some very eminent Master in Italy.

However, having been to the premiere of Catone at the King's Theatre, the 1st Earl of Bristol wrote in a letter:

I am just come from a long, dull, and consequently tiresome Opera of Handel's, whose genius seems quite exhausted. […] The only thing I liked in it was our Naples acquaintance, Celestina; who is not so pretty as she was, but sings better than she did.

— John Hervey, Letter to Stephen Fox, St James's (4 November 1732).

According to the commercial release sheet of the 2017 Glossa recording (GCD 923511):

The pasticcio's plot functions admirably, the arias are stunning, both individually and collectively [and it] is a feast of sparkling crowd-pleasing virtuosity.
