= Antonia Merighi =

Italian opera singer

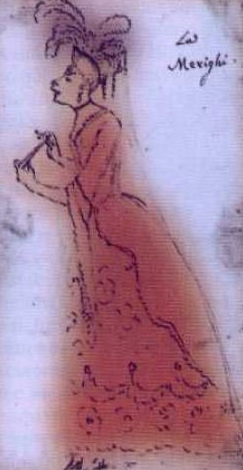
Merighi in a caricature by Antonio Maria Zanetti

Antonia Margherita Merighi (born Bologna – died by 1764) was an Italian contralto active between 1703 and 1744 and known for her performances in operas by George Frideric Handel.

== Biography ==
Merighi's initial career was in Italy, where for several years she was a virtuosa singer at the court of Violante Beatrice, Grand Princess of Tuscany, and sang in theatres in as well as in Venice, Parma, Turin, Mantua, Naples and her native Bologna, often in travesti roles. In Naples, she created the role of Iarba in the premiere of Domenico Sarro's Didone abbandonata (Teatro San Bartolomeo, 1 February 1724) and appeared in at least 18 other operas there.

She moved to London in 1729 where for two seasons she sang in many of Handel's operas, sometimes in roles created for her by the composer (Matilda in Lotario, Rosmira in Partenope and Erissena in Poro), and sometimes in soprano parts from earlier operas adapted for her voice. She returned again to London in 1736 and in 1738 where she sang in the premieres of three more operas by Handel as well as in operas by other composers. She also sang at Handel's benefit concert at the King's Theatre in 1738. According to Winton Dean, her last opera performances appear to have been in Munich during the 1740 Carnival season.

After her retirement from the stage, she lived in Bologna. Merighi was married to the tenor Carlo Carlani (1716–1776).

== Contemporaneous accounts ==
The Daily Courant of 2 July 1729 published names and descriptions of the new singers for Handel's 1729 season at the King's Theatre:

Mr. Handel, who is just returned from Italy, has contracted with the following persons to perform in the Italian opera: Sig. Bernacchi, who is esteemed the best singer in Italy; Signora Merighi, a woman of a very fine presence, an excellent actress, and a very good singer, with a counter-tenor voice; Signora Strada, who hath a very fine treble voice, a person of singular merit; Sig. Annibale Pio Fabri, a most excellent tenor and a fine voice; his wife, performs a man's part exceedingly well; Signora Bertoldi, who is a very fine treble voice".

Mary Delany, Handel's lifelong friend and supporter, was one of the few invited to the rehearsals for the 1729 season. In a letter to a friend, she wrote of his new singer:

La Merighi [...] her voice is not extraordinarily good or bad. She is tall, and has a very graceful person with a tolerable face. She seems to be a woman about forty; she sings easily and agreeably.

When Merighi returned for the 1736 season after an absence of several years, Delany wrote:

Merighi — with no sound in her voice, but thundering action, a beauty with no other merit

Merighi's acting ability (and that of the castrato, Nicolo Grimaldi) was also noted by Giambattista Mancini in his 1774 Pensieri e riflessioni pratiche sopra il canto figurato:

Nicola Grimaldi, alias Cavalier Niccolino, possessed the art of recitative and acting to such perfection that although he was very poor in other talents and did not have a beautiful voice, he became very singular. The same is true of Madame Merighi.

== Handelian roles ==
Merighi is known to have sung the following roles in Handel's operas performed at the King's Theatre in London:

- Matilda in Lotario (1729)
- Rosmira in Partenope (1730)
- Elisa in Tolomeo, re di Egitto (1730)
- Armira in Scipione (1730)
- Erissena in Poro, re dell'Indie (1731, 1736)
- Armida in Rinaldo (1731)
- Unulfo in Rodelinda (1731)
- Gernando in Faramondo (1738)
- Giulia in Alessandro Severo (1738)
- Amastre in Serse (1738)

== Sources ==
- Casaglia, Gherardo (2005). "Antonia Margherita Merighi". L'Almanacco di Gherardo Casaglia (in Italian).
- Croce, Benedetto, I Teatri Di Napoli, Secolo XV-XVIII, originally published in 1891 and published in facsimile by BiblioBazaar, LLC, 2009. ISBN 1-113-15733-X
- Dean, Winton, "Merighi, Antonia Margherita", The New Grove Dictionary of Music and Musicians 2nd Edition, Vol 12, 2001. ISBN 0-333-60800-3
- Delany, Mary, The autobiography and correspondence of Mary Granville, Mrs. Delany (edited and annotated by Lady Augusta Waddington Hall Llanover), R. Bentley, 1861
- Mancini, Giambattista, Practical reflections on the figurative art of singing, English translation by Pietro Buzzi, R. G. Badger, 1912 (originally published 1774 in Italian as Pensieri e riflessioni pratiche sopra il canto figurato),
- Streatfeild, Richard Alexander, Handel, London: Methuen & Co., 1910.
