= Stile Antico =

British vocal ensemble

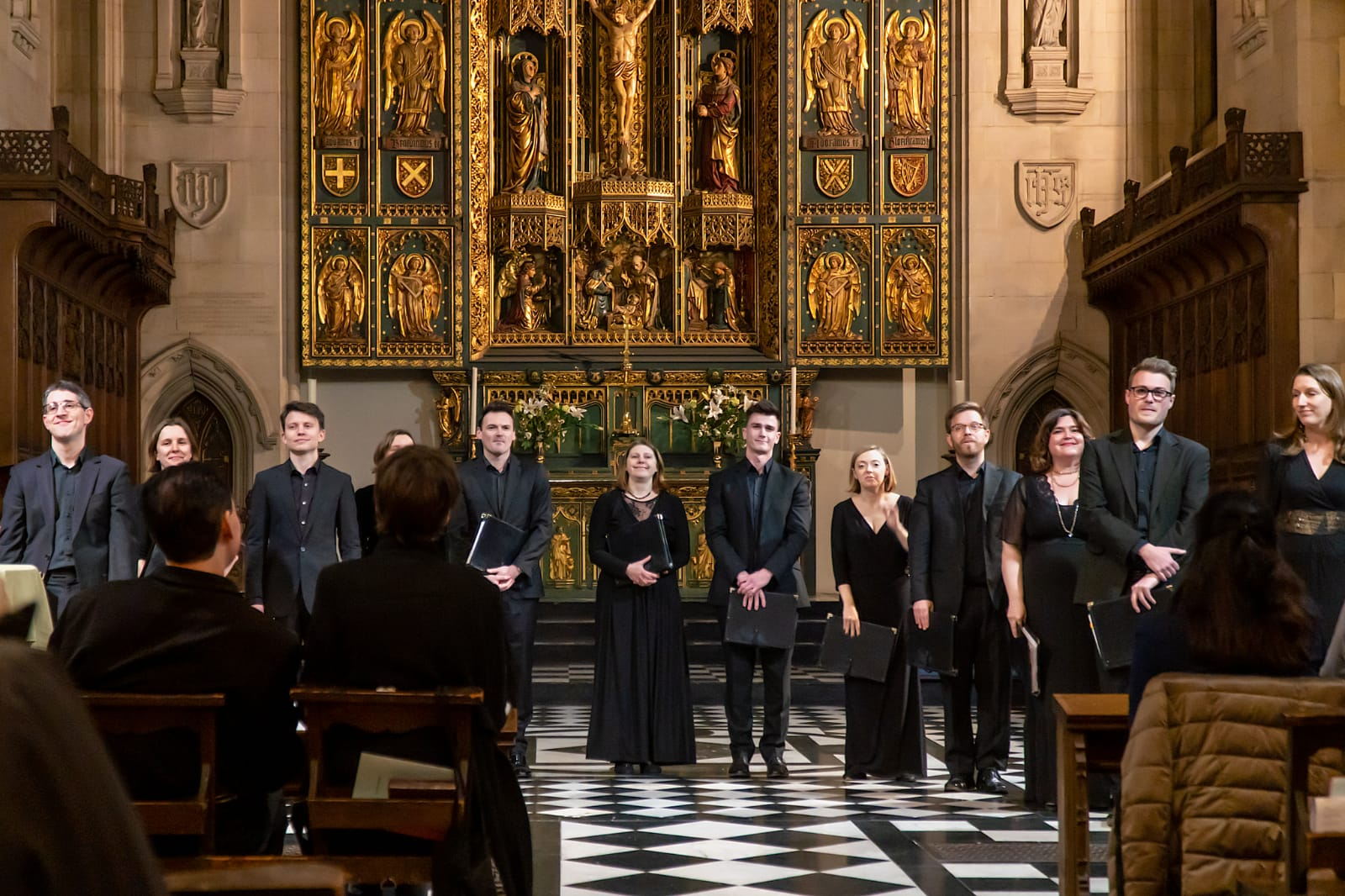
Stile Antico in London in 2020.

Stile Antico is a British vocal ensemble, specialising in polyphonic early music composed prior to the eighteenth century. Like groups such as the Tallis Scholars or The Sixteen, it has roots in the choral tradition of the Oxford and Cambridge colleges, but, unusually for groups tackling complex polyphony, Stile Antico has no conductor. The singers rehearse and perform as chamber musicians, an approach which has been praised by critics.

Established in 2001, they won the Audience Prize at the 2005 Early Music Network Young Artists' Competition, and have since been described as "one of the brightest new stars in the firmament of Renaissance vocal ensembles".

They have recorded fifteen discs for the Harmonia Mundi label and in 2020 announced a new partnership with Decca Classics for a "trilogy of new albums". Their debut recording, Music for Compline, achieved great commercial success after it was featured on NPR's All Things Considered, reaching #2 in the Billboard Classical chart; NPR's Tom Manoff described the group as "one of the finest choral ensembles of our day". The disc also received industry awards including the 2007 Diapason d'or de l'année and was nominated for the 50th Grammy Awards. Their release Song of Songs, was the winner of the 2009 Gramophone Award for Early music, and spent three weeks at #1 on the Billboard Classical chart. It was also nominated for the 52nd Grammy Awards. Their disc The Golden Renaissance: Josquin des Prez, won the inaugural Gramophone Award for Spatial Audio in 2021.

The group has collaborated extensively with Fretwork, Folger Consort, Marino Formenti, B’Rock, Rihab Azar, and Sting, with whom they toured Europe, Australia, and the Far East with his Songs from the Labyrinth project (based on the work of John Dowland) and appeared as guests on his 2009 album If on a Winter's Night....

In 2013, they were involved in the celebrations for the centenary of the Carnegie UK Trust, commemorating the Trust's support for OUP's multi-volume publication of Tudor church music in the 1920s. They released a disc The Phoenix Rising centred on Byrd's Mass for Five Voices.

In 2018, the group performed at the GRAMMY awards ceremony, having been nominated in the Best Small Ensemble Performance category.

== Members ==
Stile Antico is made up of 12 members. Its current members are:

- Helen Ashby (Soprano)
- Kate Ashby (Soprano)
- Rebecca Hickey (Soprano)
- Emma Ashby (Alto)
- Cara Curran (Alto)
- Rosie Parker (Alto)
- Andrew Griffiths (Tenor)
- Jonathan Hanley (Tenor)
- Benedict Hymas (Tenor)
- James Arthur (Bass)
- Nathan Harrison (Bass)
- Gareth Thomas (Bass)

== Discography ==
- Music for Compline (2007). Awards: 2007 Diapason d'or de l'année, CHOC du Monde de la Musique, Preis der deutschen Schallplattenkritik (May 2007), Classics Today 10/10)
- Heavenly Harmonies (2008). Awards: Diapason d'or (April 2008), Preis der deutschen Schallplattenkritik (May 2008), Classics Today 10/10)
- Song of Songs (2009). Awards: Gramophone Award for Early Music (2009), Choc de Classica (May 2009), Classics Today 10/10)
- Media Vita (2010). Awards: Preis der deutschen Schallplattenkritik (May 2010), Classics Today 10/10)
- Puer natus est (2010). Awards: Diapason d'or (October 2010), Edison Klassiek (2011), Preis der deutschen Schallplattenkritik (2011), International Record Review 'Outstanding' (October 2010), Choc de Classica (November 2010), Classics Today 10/10)
- Tune Thy Musicke to Thy Hart (2012). Award: Choc de Classica (March 2012)
- Passion and Resurrection (2012). Awards: Classics Today 10/10
- The Phoenix Rising (2013). Awards: Diapason d'or (September 2013), Preis der deutschen Schallplattenkritik (2013), Choc de Classica (2013), International Record Review 'Outstanding' (September 2013), Classics Today 10/10, Fono Forum Empfehlung des Monat (October 2013)
- From the Imperial Court (2014)
- A Wondrous Mystery (2015). Awards: Classics Today 10/10, (October 2015)
- Divine Theatre: Sacred Motets by Giaches de Wert (2016). Awards: La Clef ResMusica, February 2017, GRAMMY Nominee, Best Small Ensemble Performance, 2018.
- Tenebrae Responsories (2017). Awards: 4F de Télérama, (March 2018), Gramophone Editor's Choice, (May 2018), Choc de Classica (2018).
- In a Strange Land (2018). Awards: Diapason d’Or, (February 2019)
- A Spanish Nativity (2019). Awards: Classics Today 10/10
- The Golden Renaissance: Josquin des Prez (2021). Awards: Gramophone Award for Spatial Audio (2021).
- The Golden Renaissance: William Byrd (January 2023)
- The Golden Renaissance: Palestrina (January 2025)
