= Orlando (opera) =

Opera by Georg Friedrich Händel

George Frideric Handel

Orlando (HWV 31) is an opera seria in three acts by George Frideric Handel written for the King's Theatre in London in 1733. The Italian libretto was adapted from Carlo Sigismondo Capece's L'Orlando after Ludovico Ariosto's Orlando Furioso, which was also the source of Handel's operas Alcina and Ariodante. More an artistic than a popular success at its first performances, Orlando is today recognised as a masterpiece.

== Performance history ==
The opera was first given at the King's Theatre in London on 27 January 1733. There were 10 further performances and it was not revived. Like other Baroque opera seria, Orlando went unperformed for many years. The first production since Handel's lifetime was given at Halle, Handel's birthplace, in 1922. A production staged by the Barber Institute of Fine Arts in Birmingham, England, in 1966, conducted by Anthony Lewis, with Janet Baker in the title role, brought the opera back to London for the first time in over two centuries with performances later the same year at Sadler's Wells Theatre. The United States premiere of the opera was presented by the Handel Society of New York (HSNY) in a concert version on 18 January 1971 at Carnegie Hall with Rosalind Elias in the title role. The HSNY had made the first recording of the opera in 1970 in Vienna with a mostly different cast for RCA Red Seal Records. Peter Sellars directed the first staged production of the work in the United States at the American Repertory Theater on 19 December 1981. Countertenor Jeffrey Gall sang the title role and Craig Smith conducted.

Among other performances, the opera was staged at the Royal Opera House in London in 2003 (Bicket) and 2007 (Mackerras, with Bejun Mehta as Orlando), at Glimmerglass in 2003, Brussels in 2012, Amsterdam (in the Brussels staging) in 2014. and by San Francisco Opera in 2019.

== Roles ==
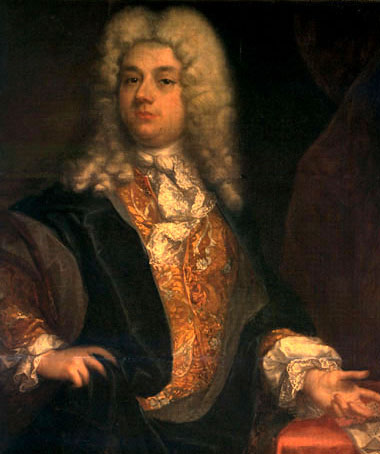
Senesino, who created the role of Orlando

Roles, voice types, and premiere cast
Role	Voice type	Premiere Cast, 27 January 1733
Orlando, a knight	alto castrato	Francesco Bernardi, called "Senesino"
Angelica, Queen of Cathay	soprano	Anna Maria Strada del Pò
Medoro, an African prince	contralto	Francesca Bertolli
Dorinda, a shepherdess	soprano	Celeste Gismondi
Zoroastro, a magician	bass	Antonio Montagnana
Isabella, a princess	silent role	-

The role of Orlando, originally written for Senesino, the great alto castrato, is nowadays generally performed by a countertenor or a mezzo-soprano. The role of Medoro was originally written for a female contralto (or mezzo-soprano), and this voice is usually retained in modern performances. The characters of Dorinda and Angelica are performed by sopranos, and Zoroastro by a bass.

== Synopsis ==
Orlando (Roland), a great soldier in Charlemagne's army, falls desperately in love with the pagan princess Angelica, who is in turn in love with another man, Medoro. Orlando cannot accept this and he is driven to madness, prevented from causing absolute carnage only by the magician Zoroastro (who eventually restores his sanity).

=== Act 1 ===
On the summit of a mountain, at night - The wizard Zoroastro scans the heavens and sees signs in the stars that the warrior Orlando will once more turn to deeds of valour and recover from his passion for the princess of Cathay, Angelica. Orlando himself appears, torn between love and duty. With a wave of his wand, the magician conjures up disturbing visions of the great heroes of antiquity asleep at Cupid's feet. Zoroastro urges Orlando to forget Venus, the goddess of love, and once more follow Mars, god of war.(Aria: Lascia Amor).

Orlando is at first shamed by Zoroastro's words but then decides love and duty do not necessarily conflict, reflecting that Hercules was not robbed of his status as a hero by his affair with Queen Omphale, or Achilles by disguising himself for a time as a woman (Aria: Non fu già men forte Alcide).

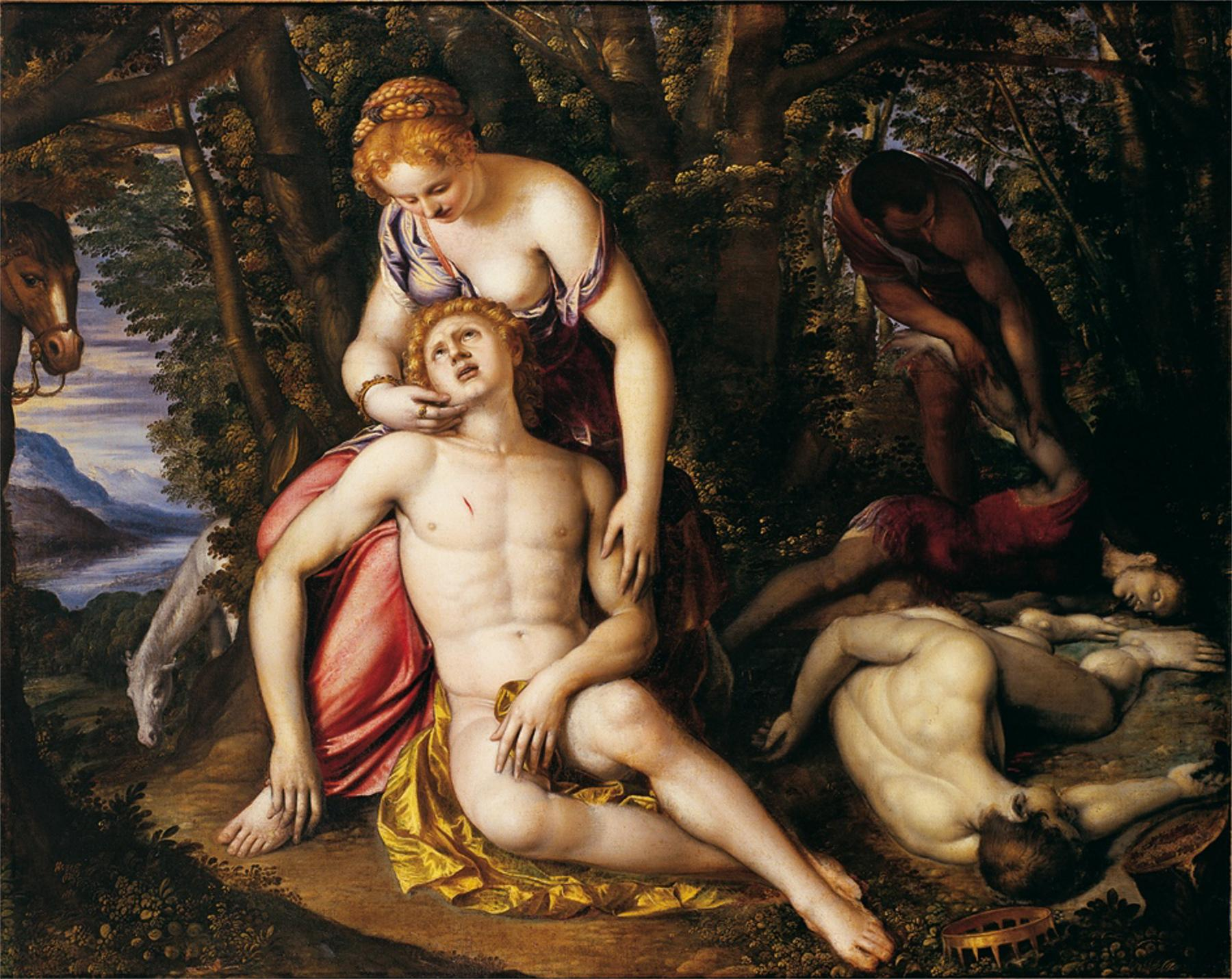
Simone Peterzano Angelica e Medoro

In a grove with shepherds' huts - The shepherdess Dorinda reflects on the beauties of nature, which however do not fill her with tranquility as they used to, which she feels may be a sign that she is falling in love. Orlando rushes across the scene with a princess, Isabella, that he has just rescued from danger, and Dorinda thinks he may be in love too. (Aria:Ho un certo rossore).

Dorinda has been sheltering princess Angelica in her hut, as Angelica had found the wounded Moorish warrior Medoro near death and fallen desperately in love with him and brought him to recuperate in the shepherdess's hut with her. Dorinda is upset that Medoro and Angelica are in love, as she has fallen in love with Medoro herself, but Medoro tells Dorinda that Angelica is a relative of his and assures Dorinda that he will never forget her kindness to him (Aria:Se il cor mai ti dira).

Dorinda knows Medoro is not telling the truth, but finds him utterly charming anyway (Aria: O care parolette).

Zoroastro tells Angelica he knows that she is in love with Medoro and warns her that Orlando's jealousy when he discovers this will lead to unpredictable and possibly dangerous results. When Angelica meets Orlando, she pretends to be jealous of his rescue of Princess Isabella, telling him he cannot expect her to love a man who may not be faithful to her (Aria: Se fedel vuoi ch’io ti creda). Orlando protests that he could never love anyone but her, and offers to do anything to prove it, including fighting fierce monsters (Aria: Fammi combattere).

As Orlando leaves, Medoro enters and asks Angelica who she was with. She explains that Orlando is a mighty warrior and besotted with her and advises that they should retreat to her kingdom in the east to escape his wrath. Dorinda is upset to see them embrace, but the lovers tell her not to be downhearted; one day she too will find love. Angelica presents Dorinda with a jewelled bracelet in gratitude for her hospitality (Trio: Consolati o bella).

=== Act 2 ===
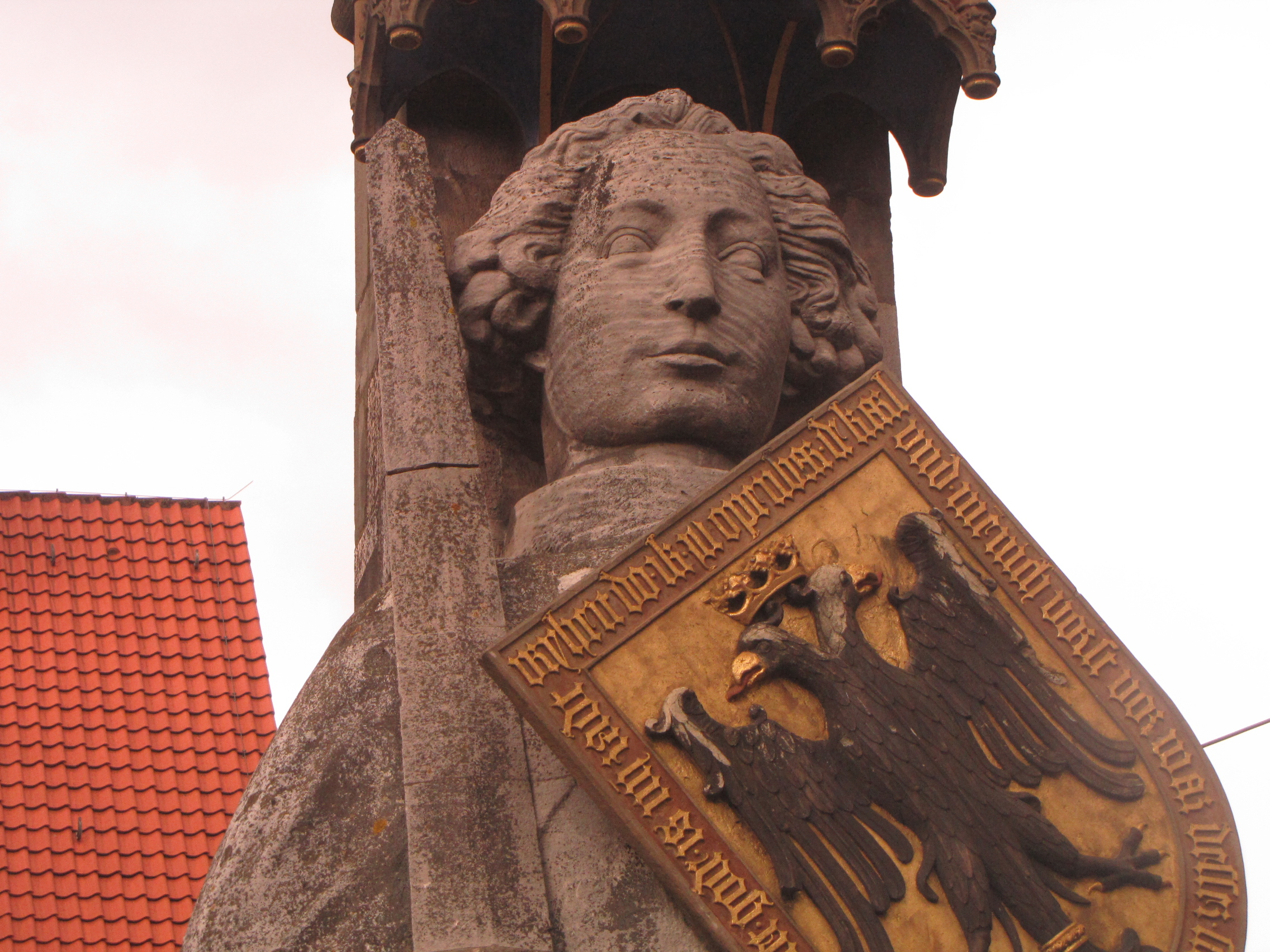
Statue of Roland (Orlando) in Bremen

In a forest - Dorinda, inconsolable over the loss of Medoro, listens to the melancholy song of the nightingale and finds it chimes with her mood (Arioso: Quando spieghi tuoi tormenti).

Orlando demands to know why Dorinda has been telling people he is in love with Isabella. Dorinda denies this and says she was speaking not of him but of Medoro and Angelica's love. She shows him the bracelet she claims Medoro gave her and says she sees his face in every brook and flower (Aria: Se mi rivolgo al prato).

Orlando recognises the bracelet as one he had given Angelica and is furious at her betrayal. He vows to kill her, then himself, and pursue her in Hell itself (Aria: Cielo! se tu il consenti).

On one side, a grove of laurel trees, on the other, the entrance to a cave - Zoroastro advises Medoro and Angelica to flee Orlando's wrath and promises to protect them on their journey, advising them that they should always be guided by reason (Aria: Tra caligini profonde).

Angelica and Medoro are saddened at having to leave the woods where they fell in love and Medoro carves their names into the trees as a memento (Aria: Verdi allori).

Angelica is grateful to Orlando for having saved her life once and feels guilty for having lied to him, but tells herself that he will come to understand her love for Medoro, being in love himself (Aria: Non potrà dirmi ingrata).

She takes a sad farewell of the beautiful grove where she first fell in love (Aria: Verdi piante, erbette liete).

Orlando rushes in and attempts to murder Angelica, who calls in vain for Medoro to rescue her. Zoroastro conjures up some spirits to whisk Angelica away in a cloud. Orlando begins to lose his reason: he imagines himself to be dead and sees himself entering Hades. He experiences a vision of his hated rival in the embrace of Proserpina, queen of the underworld, but then notices that Proserpina is crying and feels pity for her. (Aria: Ah Stigie larve! Ah scelerati spettri ).

Becoming infuriated again, Orlando rushes into the cave, but it splits open, revealing Zoroastro in a flying chariot. He puts Orlando into it and carries him away. (Aria: Vaghe pupille, non piangete).

=== Act 3 ===
In a grove with palm trees - Medoro became separated from Angelica in the confusion and has returned to Dorinda's hut to seek refuge once more. He tells her he would love her if he could, but his heart is not his to give (Aria: Vorrei poterti amar).

Dorinda comments on the whirlwind of passions caused by love (Aria: Amore è qual vento).

Orlando appears and, addressing Dorinda as Venus, declares his love for her. Dorinda can see Orlando is still out of his senses, and this is even more apparent when he confuses her with a male enemy he had fought with previously.

Zoroastro appears and orders his attendant spirits to transform the grove to a dark cave, where he will try to restore Orlando to sanity. He knows that tempests eventually recede, and calm will return (Aria:Sorge infausta una procella).

Angelica finds Dorinda weeping and she explains that Orlando in his madness has burnt her cottage to the ground, killing Medoro in the process. Angelica is devastated and when Orlando appears she begs him to kill her too (Duet: Finché prendi ancora il sangue).

Orlando hurls Angelica into the cave and, imagining he has rid the world of all its monsters, lies down to rest. Zoroastro declares the time has come for Orlando's mind to be healed; a magical bird descends with a golden phial, the contents of which the sorcerer sprinkles on Orlando's sleeping face. As Orlando begins to feel the effects of the magic potion, he sings (Aria: Gia l'ebro mia ciglio).

Orlando awakes, restored to reason, but is horrified to learn that he has killed both Medoro and Angelica and begs for death himself. Zoroastro has saved Angelica and Medoro however; Orlando is overjoyed to see them and wishes them a happy life together. Dorinda will forget her sorrow and invites everyone to her cottage to celebrate (Chorus: Con un diverso ardor, gia che ciascun e pago).

== Context and analysis ==
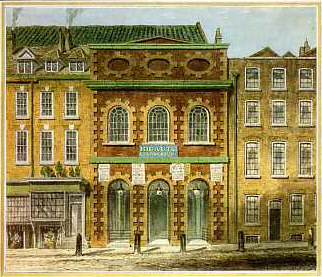
The King's Theatre, London, where Orlando had its first performance

The German-born Handel, after spending some of his early career composing operas and other pieces in Italy, settled in London, where in 1711 he had brought Italian opera for the first time with his opera Rinaldo. A tremendous success, Rinaldo created a craze in London for Italian opera seria, a form focused overwhelmingly on solo arias for the star virtuoso singers. In 1719, Handel was appointed music director of an organisation called the Royal Academy of Music (unconnected with the present day London conservatoire), a company under royal charter to produce Italian operas in London. Handel was not only to compose operas for the company but hire the star singers, supervise the orchestra and musicians, and adapt operas from Italy for London performance.

The Royal Academy of Music collapsed at the end of the 1728 - 29 season, partly due to the huge fees paid to the star singers. Handel went into partnership with John James Heidegger, the theatrical impresario who held the lease on the King's Theatre in the Haymarket where the operas were presented and started a new opera company with a new prima donna, Anna Strada.

Handel decided to present a revised version of an earlier work to an English text, Esther, in concert form as an addition to the 1732 opera season, with the singers currently appearing in the Italian operas but no scenery or stage action. The work was extremely popular and thus the form of the English oratorio was invented, almost by accident. Also in 1732, the earlier English-language masque Acis and Galatea was revised and presented at the King's Theatre as an English language serenata and in March 1733 a new English oratorio, Deborah, was performed as part of Handel's season at the King's Theatre, with the stars of the Italian opera singing in English, and the composer / impresario was so confident of the work's success that he doubled the price of admission for the first performance, causing some resentment and comment in the press. These three English language works, Esther, Acis and Galatea and Deborah, all contained leading roles for the celebrated Italian castrato Senesino, a star of Handel's operas and a great draw for London audiences since 1720, but he was not comfortable singing in English and although all three works were popular with audiences, his pronunciation of the English texts drew some comment and ridicule. Orlando, an Italian opera with a starring role by Handel for Senesino, was originally scheduled to premiere on 23 January 1733 but an announcement was placed in the London press that the opening had been postponed until the 27th, "the principal performers being indisposed".

The diarist who compiled what is known as "Colman's Opera Register" recorded after the premiere of Orlando:

Orlando Furiose a New Opera, by Handel The Cloathes & Scenes all New. Extraordinary fine & magnificent – performed Severall times until Saturday.

(New costumes and scenery were not provided for every new staging as is the custom today but were often taken from stock).

Scottish politician and lawyer Sir John Clerk, also a musical connoisseur and a composer himself, saw Orlando in its original run of eleven performances and wrote:

I never in all my life heard a better piece of musick nor better perform’d – the famous Castrato, Senesino made the principal Actor the rest were all Italians who sung with very good grace and action, however, the Audience was very thin so that I believe they get not enough to pay the Instruments in the orchestra. I was surprised to see the number of Instrumental Masters for there were 2 Harpsichords, 2 large basse violins each about 7 foot in length at least with strings proportionable that cou’d not be less than a ¼ of an inch diameter, 4 violoncellos, 4 bassoons, 2 Hautbois, 1 Theorbo lute & above 24 violins. These made a terrible noise & often drown’d the voices. One Signior Montagnania sung the bass with a voice like a Canon. I never remember to have heard any thing like him. Amongst the violins were 2 Brothers of the name Castrucci who play’d with great dexterity.

Clerk notes the "thin" audience but the royal family attended almost every performance; after one the Queen suffered a slight accident as noted in the press:

On Saturday Night last, as her Majesty was coming from the Opera House in the Hay-Market, the Fore Chairman had the Misfortune to slip, going down the step by Ozinda's Coffee-house near St. James's House, by which Accident the Chair fell, and broke the Glasses; but her Majesty happily got no Harm.

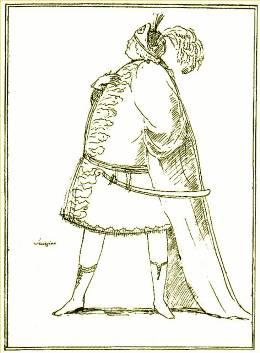
Caricature of Senesino

The London press carried a notice on 2 June 1733:

We are credibly inform’d that one Day last Week Mr. H–d–l, Director-General of the Opera-House, sent a Message to Signior Senesino, the famous Italian Singer, acquainting Him that He had no farther Occasion for his Service; and that Senesino reply’d the next Day by a Letter, containing a full Resignation of all his Parts in the Opera, which He had perform’d for many Years with great Applause.

It would be no surprise if Orlando had contributed to the break with Senesino. The many unusual and innovative features of the opera could have made a singer who had for 25 years enjoyed the fame of the opera stage, steeped in the conventions of opera seria, confused or even insecure. Overall, there were only three full da capo arias provided for him, none in the last act; his only duet with the leading soprano was short and formally somewhat unusual; and he was not allowed to participate in the main ensemble number, the trio at the end of the first act. Although he had in the great "mad scene" at the end of the second act nearly ten minutes with the stage to himself, the music offered him little opportunity for vocal ornamentation. In addition, he may here and elsewhere in the opera have been unsure if he had to play a serious heroic or a subtly comic role, and whether, if the latter was true, he as a singer and an opera performer were being ridiculed.

In January 1733, before Handel had fired Senesino, there were already plans to start a second opera company in London to rival Handel's as John West, 2nd Earl De La Warr, wrote to the Duke of Richmond:

'There is a spirit got up against the Dominion of Mr. Handel, a subscription carry'd on, and Directors chosen, who have contracted with Senesino, and have sent for Cuzzoni, and Farinelli...'.

The situation was made worse by Handel's decision to double the prices of the tickets to the oratorio Deborah, even for those who had already paid a subscription for the whole season:

'Hendel thought, encouraged by the Princess Royal, it had merit enough to deserve a guinea, and the first time it was performed at that price...there was but a 120 people in the House. The subscribers being refused unless they would pay a guinea, they, insisting upon the right of their silver tickets, forced into the House, and carried their point.'(letter from Lady Irwin to Lord Carlisle on 31 March)

All this increased the hostility towards Handel's company and his audience began to look for alternative entertainment. On June 15, several noble lords met with the approval of Frederick, Prince of Wales, to form a new opera company, the so-called "Opera of the Nobility" in open opposition to Handel, with London favourite Senesino again in leading roles and others of Handel's star singers in the new company.

Orlando shows a flexibility and diversity in its musical forms, moving away from the opera seria convention of one da capo aria after another. There are several shorter songs with no repeat section as well as one of the most extraordinary scenes in Baroque opera, the mad scene for the title character that ends the second act, a mix of arioso and aria, jagged rhythms and a rondo that becomes increasingly manic as the hero's mind breaks down.

To Winton Dean,Orlando is a "masterpiece... musically the richest of all his operas’ (Handel and the Opera Seria, p. 91), comparable on several counts with Mozart's The Magic Flute.

The opera is scored for two recorders, two oboes, bassoon, two horns, strings and continuo (cello, lute, harpsichord).

== Recordings ==
=== Audio recordings ===
Orlando discography, audio recordings
Year	Cast: Orlando, Angelica, Medoro, Dorinda Zoroastro	Conductor, orchestra	Label
1990	James Bowman, Arleen Augér, Catherine Robbin, Emma Kirkby, David Thomas	Christopher Hogwood, Academy of Ancient Music	CD:L'Oiseau-Lyre, Cat:430 845-2
1996	Patricia Bardon, Rosemary Joshua, Hilary Summers, Rosa Mannion, Harry van der Kamp	William Christie, Les Arts Florissants	CD:Erato; Cat:0630-14636-2
2012	Owen Willetts, Karina Gauvin, Allyson McHardy, Amanda Forsythe, Nathan Berg	Alexander Weimann, Pacific Baroque Orchestra	CD:Atma; Cat:ACD22678
2013	Bejun Mehta, Sophie Karthäuser, Kristina Hammarström, Sunhae Im, Konstantin Wolff	René Jacobs, B'Rock Orchestra	CD:DG Archiv; Cat:4792199

=== Video recording ===
Orlando discography, video recordings

Year	Cast: Orlando, Angelica, Medoro, Dorinda Zoroastro	Conductor, orchestra	Stage director	Label
2007	Marijana Mijanovic, Martina Janková, Katharina Peetz, Christina Clark, Konstantin Wolff	William Christie; Zürich Opera	Jens-Daniel Herzog	DVD:Arthaus Musik; Cat:101309
