= List of theatres and opera houses in Venice =

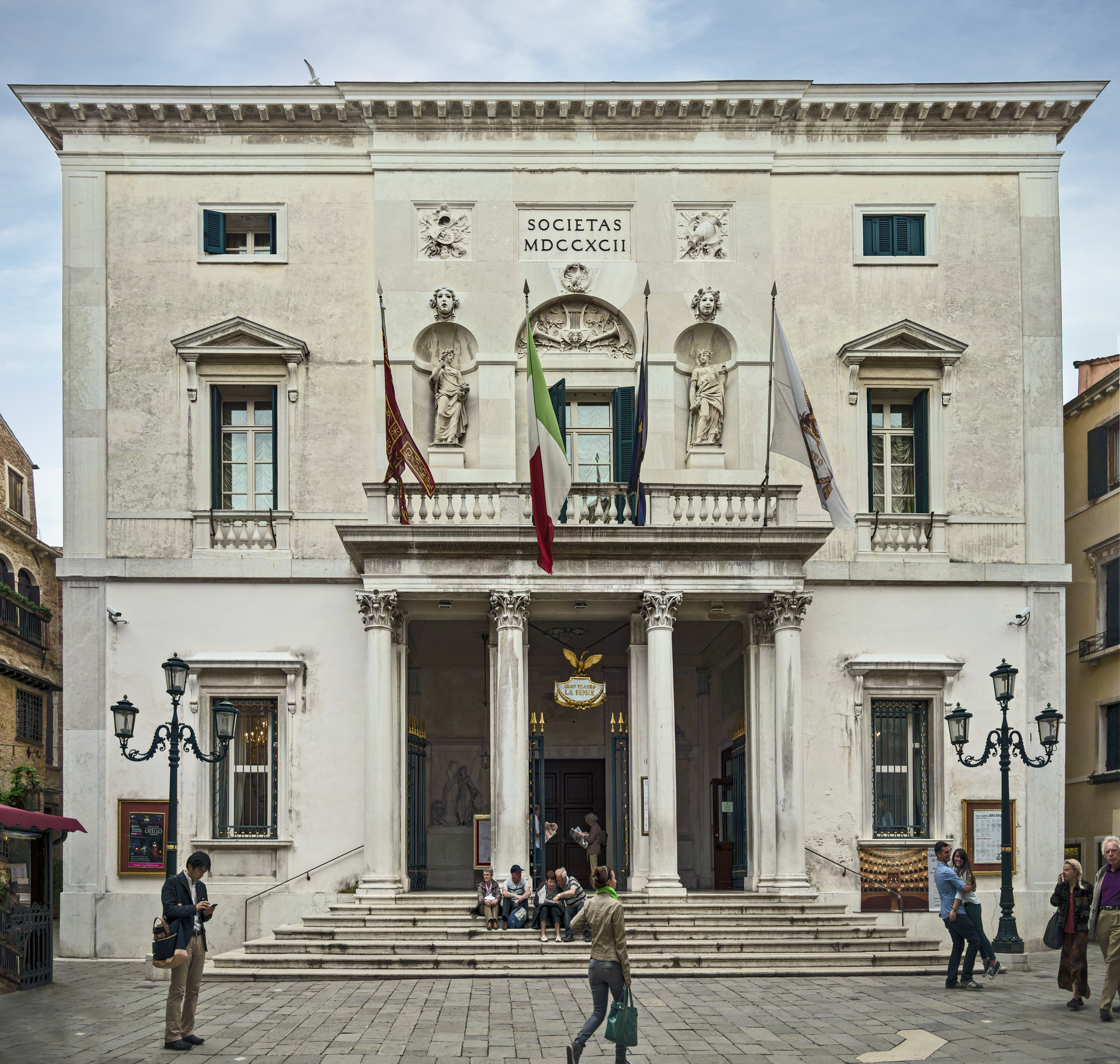
La Fenice

The first commercial opera in Venice was set up in 1637, after which at one point the city had six opera houses. This ushered in a period in which they throve until the decline in opera and theatre with the advent of television. Recently there has been a revival due to tourism and events such as the International Theatre Festival of the Biennale di Venezia.

All the main Venetian theatres were owned by important patrician families, combining business with pleasure in a city of crowded and competitive theatrical culture. When most opera in Europe was still being put on by courts, "economic prospects and a desire for exhibitionistic display", as well a decline in their traditional overseas trading, attracted the best Venetian families to invest in the theatre during the 17th century. Europe's first dedicated public and commercial opera house was the Teatro Tron from 1637.

The Grimani, with whom the Vendramin often inter-married, were dominant, owning what is now called the Teatro Malibran, then called the Teatro San Giovanni Grisostomo, as well as the Teatro San Benedetto and other houses. The Veniers owned La Fenice, still the main opera house.

== Still open today ==
- La Fenice – Venice's leading opera house. The first theatre was built in 1792 and the current structure opened in 2003.
- Teatro Goldoni 1622–present. Originally the Teatro Vendramin di San Salvador (in Venetian dialect) or Teatro San Salvatore, 1622, renamed Teatro San Luca, then Teatro Apollo in 1833, and from 1875 til now Teatro Goldoni, today home to a theatre company Teatro Stabile di Veneto "Carlo Goldoni".
- Teatro Malibran originally Teatro San Giovanni Grisostomo 1678. Re-opened in 2001 by President Carlo Azeglio Ciampi
- Theatre Fondamenta Nuove, 1998 on the north lagoon, musical and cultural events, as well as conferences and workshops.

On the mainland

- Teatro del Parco, Mestre. An indoors theatre in Parco della Bissuola, the largest city park.
- Teatro Toniolo, Mestre. re-opened 2003
- Teatro della Murata, Mestre – opened 1970; a small experimental theatre, seating 70, in an old warehouse attached to the remaining city walls.

== Now demolished, destroyed by fire or closed ==
- Teatro San Cassiano 1637–1812. Site of first commercial opera, Francesco Mannelli's Andromeda, in 1637. Demolished 1812.
- Teatro Santi Giovanni e Paolo 1638–1715; a theatre owned by the Grimani family on the Calle della Testa.
- Teatro Novissimo 1640–1645. Six seasons, six operas.
- Teatro San Moisè 1640–1818. Near the Palazzo Giustinian and the Church of San Moisè at the entrance to the Grand Canal.
- Teatro Santi Apostoli 1648–1687
- Teatro Sant'Apollinare 1651–1661
- Teatro San Samuele 1656–1889. Founded in 1655 by the Grimani family. The theatre was active up until 1889. It stood on the Rio del Duca and was demolished in 1894. "It is a pretty theatre well adapted for hearing. Opera buffas are performed here" (Murray, 1860)
- Teatro San Angelo 1677–1803. Theatre where Vivaldi produced many of his 100 operas.
- Teatro San Benedetto 1755–1937. Another theatre of the Grimani family, built 1755, burned down 1774, rebuilt. Later "called Teatro Gallo after its proprietor" (Murray, 1860) then remodelled extensively and renamed the Cinema Rossini in 1937.
- Teatro Ai Saloni of San Gregorio 1651–1689. Active for the members of the Academy for spoken drama.
- Teatro a Cannaregio 1679–1699. Built by the patrician Marco Morosini near the Chiesa di San Giobbe for the performance of his opera Ermelinda (1679).
- Teatro alle Zattere a private theatre on the promenade in Ognissanti 1679.
- Teatro Calle dell'Oca, small theatre 1707
- Teatro Altieri – private theatre in the garden of the Altieri princes. 1690 Gl'amori fortunati negli equivoci.
