= Rosa Mannion =

British operatic soprano (born 1962)

Rosa Mannion (born 1962) is a British operatic soprano who has sung leading roles both in the opera houses of the UK and Europe and in the recording studio. Although particularly known for her roles in the operas of Handel and Mozart, she sang a wide repertoire during her career including Violetta in La traviata and all the leading female roles in The Tales of Hoffmann (Olympia, Antonia, and Giulietta).

== Career ==
Mannion was born in Liverpool and studied at the Royal Scottish Academy of Music before making her operatic debut in 1984 as Adina in L'elisir d'amore with Scottish Opera. She also undertook Un ballo in maschera (Oscar) for Opera 80, where the light coloratura fitted her voice, as it then was. She also gained valuable experience working with a touring company. The contract with Scottish Opera gave her three years there during which she sang Pamina, Sophie in Werther and Barbarina as well as understudying Susanna. Towards the end of this period Peter Jonas from English National Opera noticed her in The Magic Flute, and invited her to audition Sophie for a revival of Rosenkavalier at the London-based company, where she went on to appear alongside Jean Rigby (Octavian), Valerie Masterson (the Marschallin) and John Tomlinson (Ochs).

In May 1988 Mannion had a telephone call from Glyndebourne asking her to replace someone who had cancelled as Constanze in Die Entführung aus dem Serail; she had five hours before the curtain up. She sang five performances at the festival itself and thirteen more on the autumn tour.

She also sang at New Israeli Opera (Pamina and Dorabella), and the Teatro Nacional de São Carlos. She sang Cordelia in Lear by Reimann in 1989, the first contemporary score that she'd undertaken, and in 1990 she sang in the premiere of Holloway's Clarissa. She joined the ENO company, and also gained rave reviews for her Magnolia in the production of Show Boat by Opera North and the RSC.

After auditioning for Zubin Mehta she sang Pamina in Tel Aviv and subsequently also sang Mahler with him. Other work included oratorios, including Messiah, plus Xerxes at ENO, and Asteria in Tamerlano for Opera North in Leeds, where she also performed Minka in Le roi malgré lui, and Dorinda in Orlando at Aix.

Mannion's Pamina at the Royal Opera House Covent Garden in 1993 and back at Aix in 1994 were received enthusiastically. For her first Countess, in Figaro's Wedding at ENO in 1994, Rodney Milnes in The Times described her tone "as sweet as it is expressive". The next major milestone was Violetta at the Coliseum in 1996 where she prompted headlines such as 'Superb Rosa', 'Brilliant Violetta'.

Her singing career was cut short by illness in 1998, after which she began teaching singing privately and as a member of the teaching staff at Bath Spa University and London's Royal College of Music.

== Recordings ==
Mannion's recordings include:

- Mozart: Così fan tutte (as Dorabella). Monteverdi Choir; English Baroque Soloists; John Eliot Gardiner (conductor). Filmed live at the Théâtre du Châtelet in 1992, originally for television broadcast. Label: Deutsche Grammophon (DVD).
- Handel: Orlando (as Dorinda). Les Arts Florissants; William Christie (conductor). Label: Erato (CD)
- Leoncavallo: Pagliacci (as Nedda). London Philharmonic Orchestra; David Parry (conductor). Label: Chandos (CD)
- Vaughan Williams: A Cotswold Romance (as Mary). London Symphony Orchestra; Richard Hickox. Chandos (CD) recorded October 1997
- Beethoven: Missa Solemnis, Op. 123. La Chapelle Royale Choir, Collegium Vocale Gent & Orchestre des Champs Elysees, Philippe Herreweghe (1995)
- Rutter: Requiem (1985). Polyphony, Bournemouth Sinfonietta, Stephen Layton. Hyperion CD recorded January 1997

=== On film ===
- Persuasion (as Concert Opera Singer). Based on the novel by Jane Austen, screenplay by Nick Dear, directed by Roger Michell, music by Jeremy Sams. BBC Television, 1995. Sony Pictures Classics / Columbia TriStar Home Video DVD.
- A Night with Handel - dramatisation of the composer's arias, over the course of one night in present-day London. Channel 4, 1997. DVD issued by NVC Arts.
