= Rosemary Joshua =

Welsh soprano singer

- Born: 16 October 1964 (age 61); Cardiff, Wales
- Education: Royal College of Music
- Occupation: Soprano singer

Rosemary Joshua (born 16 October 1964) is a Welsh soprano, particularly known for her performances in Handel's operas.

Joshua was born in Cardiff, Wales, and studied at the Royal College of Music. After completing her studies there, she made her debut at the Aix-en-Provence Festival as Angelica in Handel's Orlando. Other early operatic appearances were Zerlina in Don Giovanni with Scottish Opera, and both Susanna in The Marriage of Figaro, Sophie in Der Rosenkavalier, norina in Don Pasquale for English National Opera. She has gone on to sing major soprano roles in many of the world's leading opera houses and festivals, including Adèle in Die Fledermaus at the Metropolitan Opera, New York; the title role in The Cunning Little Vixen and Titania in Midsummer Nights Dream at La Scala, Milan and Dutch National Opera in Amsterdam; Anne Trulove in The Rake's Progress at the Glyndebourne Festival and Zerlina, Anne Truelove, Angelica, Orlando, Despina at the Royal Opera House, Covent Garden.

She took the title role in Ken Russell's production of Princess Ida for ENO at the Coliseum Theatre in 1992.

She has appeared in concert across Europe and the USA And has collaborated with many leading conductors including Roger Norrington, Charles Mackerras, Mark Elder, Simon Rattle, Antonio Pappano, Vladimir Jurowski, Gustavo Dudamel, Colin Davis, Marc Albrecht, René Jacobs, William Christie and Marc Minkowski in leading concert halls including The London BBC Proms Royal Albert hall, Tchaikovsky Hall in Moscow, Concertgebouw, Carnegie Hall, Wigmore Hall and Musikverein and Mozarteum, Vienna. Her many recordings include Handel's Partenope, Esther, Semele, Romilda (Serse), Emilia (Flavio), Nitocris (Belshazzar), Michal (Saul) and Angelica (Orlando); as well as Venus and Adonis, Blow, Belinda in Dido and Aeneas and Mahler's Symphony No. 4, Manfred Tojahns Orest and a solo recording of Purcell's Harmonia Sacra. She has also released two duo recitals with Sarah Connolly of Handel Duets and a Purcell duets live from the Wigmore Hall.

Rosemary Joshua has been appointed as the Artistic Director of the Dutch National Opera Studio, the new Young Artists programme at the Dutch National Opera house which launched in September 2018.
