= Annibale Pio Fabri =

Italian singer and composer (1697–1760)

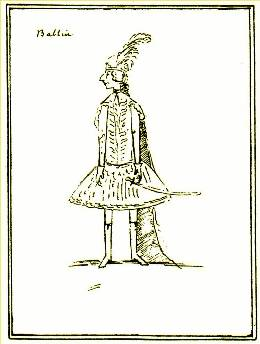
A contemporary caricature of Annibale Pio Fabri, who created the role of "Berengario" in Lotario

Annibale Pio Fabri (1697 in Bologna – 12 August 1760 in Lisbon), also known as Balino, from Annibalino, diminutive of his first name, was an Italian singer and composer of the 18th century. One of the leading tenors of his age in a time dominated by the castrati, Fabri is now best known for his association with the composer George Frideric Handel, in whose operas Fabri sang.

== Early career ==
He was one of many famous pupils of the composer, singer and teacher Francesco Pistocchi. His dramatic career began in 1711 in Rome, and during the course of the decade, he sang at Venice, Bologna, and Mantua, creating, among others, the title role in Vivaldi's L'incoronazione di Dario. He joined the Accademia Filarmonica of Bologna as a composer of oratorio circa 1719 and was named its Principal, or president, in 1725, 1729, 1745, 1747, and 1750. During the 1720s, he reached the upper echelons of the Italian singers of the time, singing in works by Leonardo Vinci and Domenico Sarro (for whom he created the role of Araspe in Didone abbandonata) at Naples (1722–1724) and by Alessandro Scarlatti (Bologna, 1724). In 1729, he joined Handel in London for two seasons, making his début in Lotario and creating roles in Partenope and Poro. In his time in London, Fabri also performed in revivals of Giulio Cesare, Tolomeo, Rinaldo, Rodelinda, and Scipione, in which Handel transposed for tenor the originally castrato title role.

== After London ==
Leaving London in 1731, Fabri appeared at Vienna in 1732, where he made the acquaintance of the Emperor Charles VI, who in the next year became a godfather to one of Fabri's sons. He continued to perform across Europe, having considerable success in three operas by Johann Adolph Hasse at Madrid (1738–1739). Fabri seems to have retired from the stage around 1750, becoming a member of Lisbon's royal chapel until his death in 1760. His compositional output from this time included a setting of the popular Metastasio libretto Alessandro nell'Indie.
