= Partenope =

1730 opera by George Frideric Handel

- Opera by George Frideric Handel
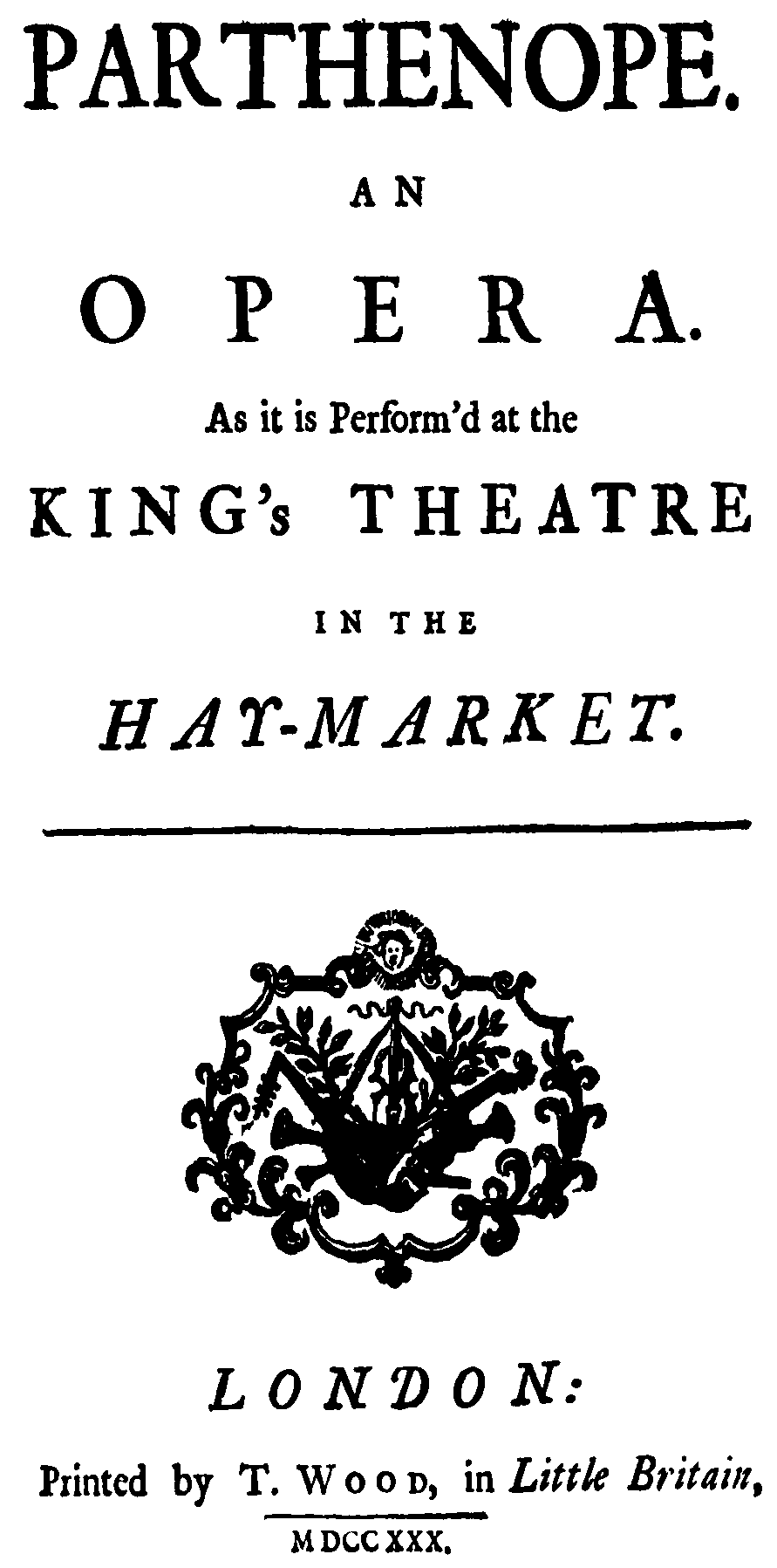
- Title page of the libretto, London 1730
- Language: Italian
- Based on: libretto by Silvio Stampiglia
- Premiere: 24 February 1730; King's Theatre, London

Partenope (Parthenope), HWV 27, is an opera by George Frideric Handel, first performed at the King's Theatre in London on 24 February 1730. Although following the structure and forms of opera seria, the work is humorous in character and light-textured in music, with a plot involving romantic complications and gender confusion. A success with audiences at the time of its original production and then unperformed for many years, Partenope is now often seen on the world's opera stages.

== Background ==
The opera, which is in three acts, is composed to an Italian libretto adapted by an unknown hand from a libretto originally written in 1699 by Silvio Stampiglia. Stampiglia's libretto had received many previous settings, including one by Caldara which Handel may have seen in Venice around 1710.

It was Handel's first comic (or, rather, unserious) opera since the much earlier Agrippina, breaking away from the more traditional opera seria works for which the composer was known in London. He originally proposed the libretto to the opera company the Royal Academy of Music (1719) in 1726. They however rejected the work because of its frivolous nature, its relatively few extended arias and its long passages of recitative. (The latter objections are not particularly true, however. The opera has relatively few ensemble pieces but is replete with gorgeous arias.) The opera manager Owen Swiney opined that the project was uncommercial; in a letter of 1726 he wrote:

[The libretto] is the very worst book (excepting one) that I ever read in my whole life. Signor Stampiglia [...] endeavours to be both humorous and witty in it: if he succeeded in his attempt on any stage in Italy, 't was merely from a depravity of taste in the audience; for I am very sure it will be received with contempt in England'

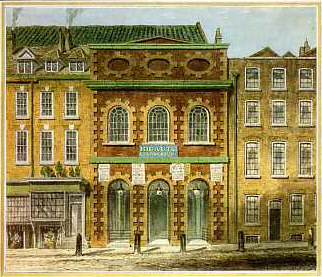
The King's Theatre, London, where Partenope had its first performance

The opera was presented during the 1730 season at the King's Theatre when Handel was working in partnership with the director John James Heidegger. The score was completed by Handel just two weeks before the premiere.

== Performance history ==
Partenope received seven performances at its original run in February 1730. Handel had the piece performed for seven more performances in December the same year, and revived it again in 1737, a sign of the work's popularity. Then, as with all Handel opera and Baroque opera generally, two hundred years more or less passed before the work was again performed in its entirety. In 1964 it was performed at Ledlanet, Scotland. The work had its U.S. premiere in 1988 at Opera Omaha. In 1998 it was performed in Italian at Glimmerglass Opera, and the same production was performed later that year at New York City Opera. A production by Christopher Alden, in English (entitled Parthenope) was staged in 2008 (premiere 9 October 2008, with the title role sung by Rosemary Joshua) by the English National Opera, in a co-production with Opera Australia. The libretto was translated by Amanda Holden. The production was set in a 1920s atmosphere and was inspired by the surrealist images of Man Ray. In 2008, the opera was presented by The Royal Danish Opera. This production was recorded and is available on DVD. Also, a concert version of the production was performed at the 2009 Proms on 19 July 2009. A production by Pierre Audi was seen at the Theater an der Wien, Vienna, in 2009 and a modern production by Francisco Negrin was staged by New York City Opera in April 2010. The Christopher Alden production, seen in London and in Australia, premiered at the San Francisco Opera in October 2014.

== Roles ==
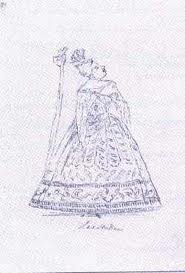
Caricature of Anna Maria Strada, who created the role of Partenope

Roles, voice types, and premiere cast
Role	Voice type	Premiere Cast, 24 February 1730 (Conductor:- )
Partenope, Queen of Naples	soprano	Anna Maria Strada del Pò
Arsace, Prince of Corinth	alto castrato	Antonio Bernacchi
Armindo, Prince of Rhodes	contralto	Francesca Bertolli
Emilio, Prince of Cumae	tenor	Annibale Pio Fabri
Rosmira/Eurimene, Princess of Cyprus, and beloved of Arsace	contralto	Antonia Merighi
Ormonte, friend of Armindo	bass	Johann Gottfried Reimschneider

== Synopsis ==
Scene: Naples, in antiquity

=== Act 1 ===
In the first scene we see Queen Partenope, founder of Naples, in her throne room adorned with a statue of Apollo, entertaining her guests, among them handsome and dashing Prince Arsace of Corinth, suitor for her hand, and the rather shy and lacking in confidence Prince Armindo of Rhodes, who is also in love with Partenope but cannot bring himself to tell her so. A new guest arrives and introduces "himself" as Prince Eurimene, but "he" is really the princess Rosmira in disguise, Arsace's previous fiancée whom he jilted when he decided to try to win the hand of Queen Partenope and who has tracked him down to Naples. Arsace is astounded by the resemblance of the newcomer "Eurimene" to his ex-girlfriend Rosmira and confronts her when they are alone. Rosmira admits it is she and berates him for his inconstancy. Arsace claims he still loves her, to which Rosmira replies that if so he can prove it by promising not to reveal her name or that she is a woman. Arsace solemnly swears to do so.

"Eurimene" /Rosmira also has a conversation with the sad Armindo whom she discovers really loves Partenope for herself, rather than just being after her position and money. Armindo can't bring himself to tell Partenope that he loves her because he thinks she prefers Arsace. Partenope herself has also noticed Armindo moping about and wants to know what the matter with him is. He does confess his love to her, to which she replies that she is committed to Arsace. Hearing this, Rosmira steps forward in her disguise as "Eurimene" and says "he" loves her too, hoping to keep Partenope from Arsace, but upsetting Armindo in the process.

Yet another suitor for Partenope's hand arrives, Prince Emilio of the neighbouring kingdom of Cumae. He has brought his army with him, and demands she agree to marry him. She refuses and he threatens her with war, to which she replies that she will not be intimidated. She says she will go into battle and fight herself and asks Arsace to lead her troops, which makes the other suitors jealous.

Alone with "Eurimene", Armindo is feeling very down about the fact that "Eurimene" is his rival, but "Eurimene" assures him that is not really the case.

=== Act 2 ===
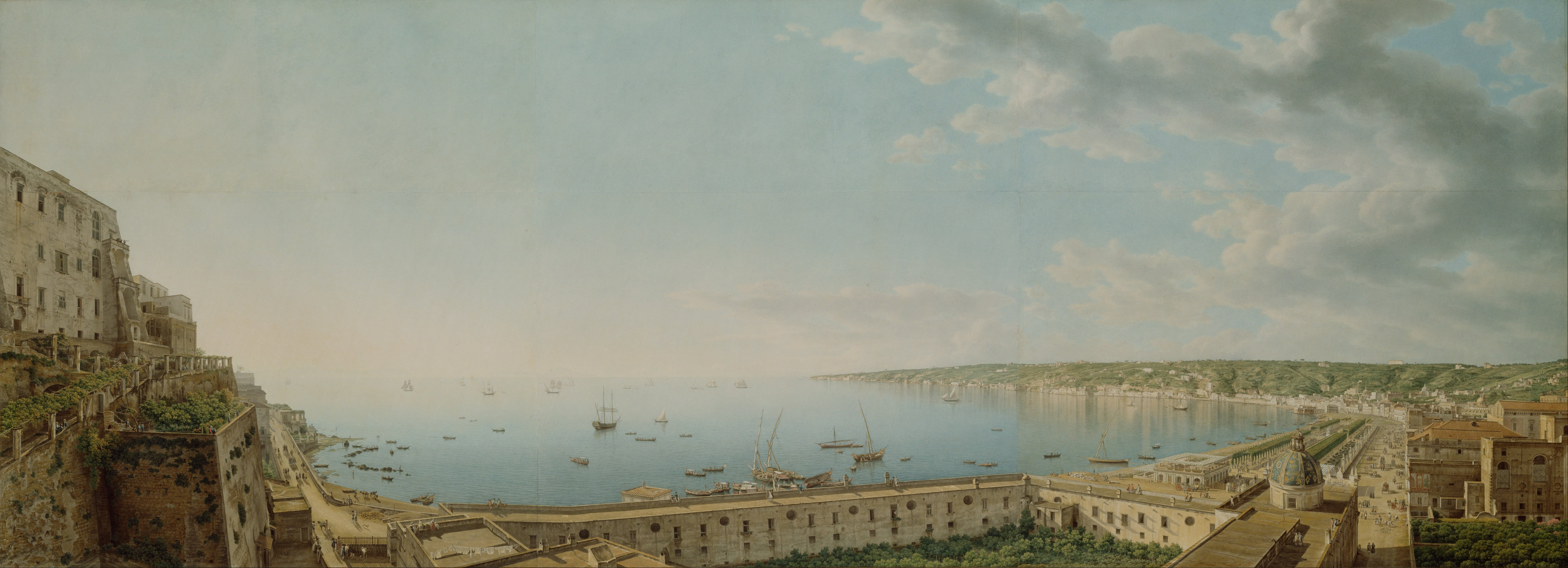
A View of the Bay of Naples

The second act begins with a depiction onstage of the battle between Partenope's and Emilio's forces. Partenope is ultimately victorious, and Emilio is imprisoned, but not before Armindo has rescued her from a dangerous situation and thereby saved her life. Rosmira, in her identity as "Eurimene", also fought in the battle and proudly asserts that "he" captured Emilio. Arsace denies this, claiming credit for that himself. At this "Eurimene" challenges Arsace to a duel.

Armindo once again tells Partenope how much he loves her. She is more encouraging to him this time but does not commit herself.

Arsace tries to make things up with Rosmira but she is very disdainful towards him. Arsace is torn between his desire for Queen Partenope and his old love Rosmira.

=== Act 3 ===
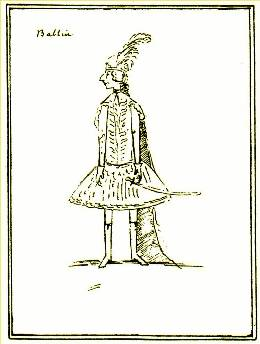
A contemporary caricature of Annibale Pio Fabri, who created the part of Emilio

Rosmira, still in disguise as "Eurimene", tells Queen Partenope that "he" challenged Arsace to a duel because "he" was sent by Princess Rosmira to avenge her honour on the man who promised to marry her but jilted her at the altar. The horrified Partenope asks Arsace if this is true and he has to admit it is. Partenope declares she will have nothing more to do with him; Armindo is looking better and better to her as prospective husband.

Arsace is having a sleepless night, knowing that he will be expected to fight "Eurimene" in a duel the next day. However, he is reluctant to fight a duel with the girl he loves. Rosmira comes to him in his rooms, watched by Partenope. When Arsace calls Rosmira's name, Partenope steps forward accusing him of faithlessness, and Rosmira /"Eurimene" does the same.

The next morning, all assemble for the duel between Arsace and "Eurimene". Arsace is in a dilemma, as he has solemnly sworn not to reveal Rosmira's identity, but cannot bring himself to fight a duel with a girl. Suddenly seized by an inspiration, he says that as the person who was challenged, he is allowed to decide how the duel will be fought - and demands they fight without their shirts on. "Eurimene" hesitates, but the others affirm that Arsace is correct, so the terms must be honoured. "Eurimene" has no choice but to admit "he" is really Princess Rosmira, and accepts the contrite Arsace as husband. Partenope will marry the overjoyed Armindo, and Emilio will take his troops and go back home to Cumae.

== Musical features ==
Many of the arias of Partenope are shorter than in Handel's previous operas. The work is also unusual in Handel's output in containing an ensemble, a comic quartet, in the third act. Also notable is the battle scene in Act Two with orchestral passages interspersed with recitatives and ariosos.

The opera is scored for two flutes, two oboes, bassoon, trumpet, two horns, strings and continuo (cello, lute, harpsichord).

== Recordings ==
=== Audio recordings ===
Partenope discography, audio recordings
Year	Cast Partenope, Arsace, Rosmira, Armindo, Emilio	Conductor, orchestra	Label
1978	Krisztina Laki, René Jacobs, Helga Müller Molinari, John York Skinner, Martyn Hill	Sigiswald Kuijken, La Petite Bande	Deutsche Harmonia Mundi/EMI CDS 7 47913-8
2004	Rosemary Joshua, Lawrence Zazzo, Hilary Summers, Stephen Wallace, Kurt Streit	Christian Curnyn, Early Opera Company	Chandos CHAN 0719
2015	Karina Gauvin, Philippe Jaroussky, Teresa Iervolino, Emőke Baráth, John Mark Ainsley, Luca Tittoto	Riccardo Minasi, Il Pomo d'Oro	Warner Classics, Erato Records

=== Video recording ===
Partenope discography, video recordings
Year	Cast Partenope, Arsace, Rosmira, Armindo, Emilio, Ormonte	Conductor, orchestra	Producer	Label
2008	Inger Dam-Jensen, Andreas Scholl, Tuva Semmingsen, Christophe Dumaux, Bo Kristian Jensen, Palle Knudsen	Lars Ulrik Mortensen, Concerto Copenhagen	Francisco Negrin	Decca 0440 074 3348, Blu-ray 0440 074 3347 8
