= Teatro alle Zattere =

17th-century opera house

The Teatro alle Zattere on the Zattere promenade in the Ognissanti district was a minor Venetian theatrical opera venue during the late 17th century

It saw the premiere of Pistocchino's first opera, Il Leandro, on 5 May 1679.

== See also ==
- List of theatres and opera houses in Venice
