= Tuva Semmingsen =

Norwegian singer (born 1975)

- Born: 13 January 1975 (age 51); Norway
- Genres: Opera, Jazz
- Occupations: Singer
- Years active: 1999–present
- Website: www.tuva.dk

Tuva Semmingsen (born 13 January 1975) is a Norwegian mezzo-soprano and coloratura singer.

After studying at the Norwegian Academy of Music, she studied at the Opera Academy in Copenhagen.

She made her debut in 1999 at the Royal Theater in Copenhagen, in the role of Cherubino in The Marriage of Figaro. From 2000 to 2016, she was a permanent member of the soloist ensemble at the Royal Theater, and performed in Julius Caesar in the role of Sesto, in Rossini's La Cenerentola as Angelina (Cinderella), in The Barber of Seville as Rosina and in Handel's Partenope as Patria Rosmira. Outside Denmark, she has toured in Cinderella with Glyndebourne Touring Opera and for the Stockholm Opera. Performed in The Barber of Seville in Opéra de Nancy, Grand Opéra de Reims, Opéra de Lille and The Norwegian Opera, and Julius Cæsar in Oslo. In 2017, she participated in a production of the comic opera Kveiteprinsen at Kilden Theater and Concert Hall in Kristiansand.

In 2014, she released modern jazz interpretations of well-known songs and sang on an album with the Danish big band The Orchestra.

She appeared as a featured singer in a television performance with the Danish National Symphony Orchestra in 2018 for a program of cinematic music themes from Spaghetti Westerns and gangster movies featuring guest conductor Sarah Hicks. Semmingsen additionally performed whistling featured in Ennio Morricone's scores. Among the production's lighter elements, Semmingsen wore revolver-shaped earrings visible during her performance.

Semmingsen continued popular movie musical thematic performances as the featured vocalist in a June 2020 Danish broadcast "Divas and Diamonds." She was backed by a mix of members from previous collaborations with the Danish National Symphony Orchestra, DR Big Band, and the Danish National Vocal Ensemble.
