= Antonio Bernacchi =

Italian opera singer

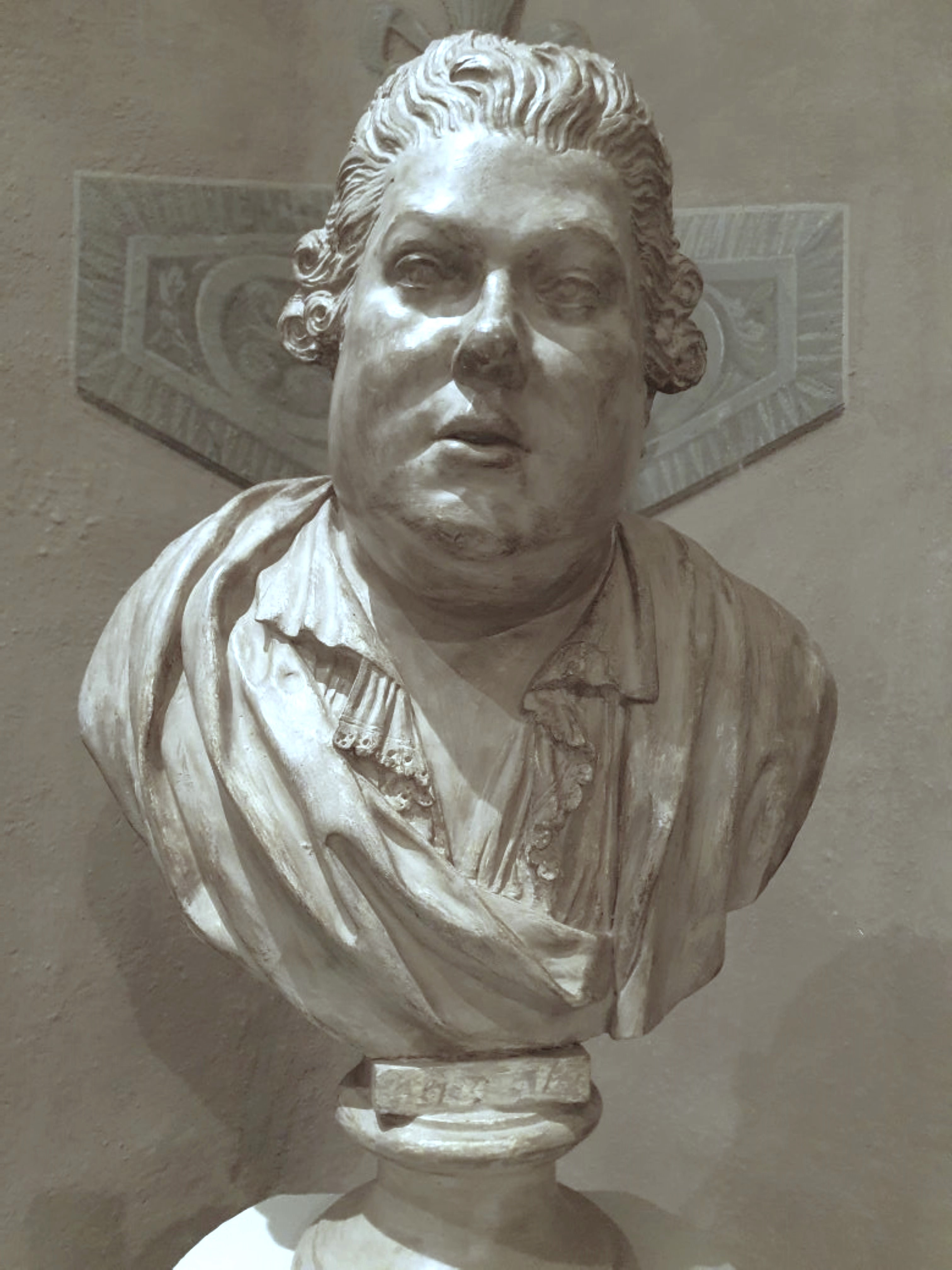
Bust of Antonio Bernacchi (unknown author, 19th century, Museo internazionale e biblioteca della musica, Bologna)

Antonio Bernacchi (21 June 1685 – 1 March 1756) was an Italian castrato, composer, and teacher of singing. He studied with Francesco Antonio Pistocchi. His pupils included Farinelli, for a brief period during 1727, and the tenor Anton Raaff. Nowadays Bernacchi is best remembered for his association with the composer George Frideric Handel, in six of whose operas he sang.

== Career ==
Bernacchi was born in Bologna, Papal States, and, having been engaged at the court of Johann Wilhelm, the Elector Palatine in 1701, began his operatic career in Genoa in 1703. His appointment in 1714 as virtuoso to Prince Antonio Farnese led to widespread recognition throughout Europe, and he performed in operas by various famous composers of the day, including Johann Adolph Hasse, Leonardo Vinci, and Alessandro Scarlatti (Rome 1721). He was an especially frequent visitor to the theatres of Venice, appearing in more than twenty operas in that city between 1712 and 1724. In 1720 the Elector of Bavaria engaged him to sing at Munich, where he often performed until 1727. In the following season, he appeared in Naples in the same company as Carestini. This occasioned much rivalry and musico-political intrigue, with the older singer attempting unsuccessfully to have his younger colleague removed. Bernacchi stood on his dignity and left for Milan in a huff.

In 1729 Handel took Bernacchi as his primo uomo for the second Royal Academy, in place of the departed Senesino. For Handel, Bernacchi created roles in Lotario (1729) and Partenope (1730). He also sang in revivals of Giulio Cesare and Tolomeo, and in the pasticcio Ormisda. Despite his fine European reputation, Bernacchi's success in England was mixed: though Charles Burney praised his intelligence as a singer, English audiences preferred Senesino.

In 1736 Bernacchi retired from the stage. He continued to give private concerts and to sing at ecclesiastical events. Of his compositions, some church music survives, as do various concert arias and duets. In his retirement, he founded a singing school at Bologna.

Bernacchi died in 1756 in the city of his birth. He was much lamented by his fellow citizens, while Farinelli, a friend as well as a rival and sometime pupil, arranged an elaborate memorial service in his honour.

== Bernacchi as a performer ==
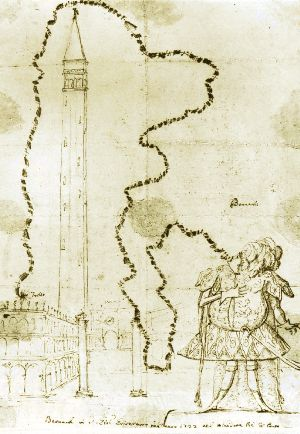
Cartoon of Bernacchi by Zanetti, showing both his taste for extravagant cadenzas, and his large size.

Mary Granville, by this date Mrs Pendarves, a friend of Handel, left this description of Bernacchi in 1729:

Bernacchi has a vast compass, his voice mellow and clear, but not so sweet as Senesino, his manner better; his person not so good, for he is as big as a Spanish friar.

In this same year Owen Swiney, who had earlier recruited Nicolini for London, described Bernacchi as "the very best singer in the world". However, others accused him of sacrificing expression to virtuosity by adopting an excessively instrumental style; in exasperation, his former teacher Pistocchi lamented: "Tristo a me, io t'ho insegnato a cantare, e tu voui suonare!" ("Sadly for me, I taught you to sing, and you want to play").
