= B'Rock Orchestra =

Belgian period ensemble

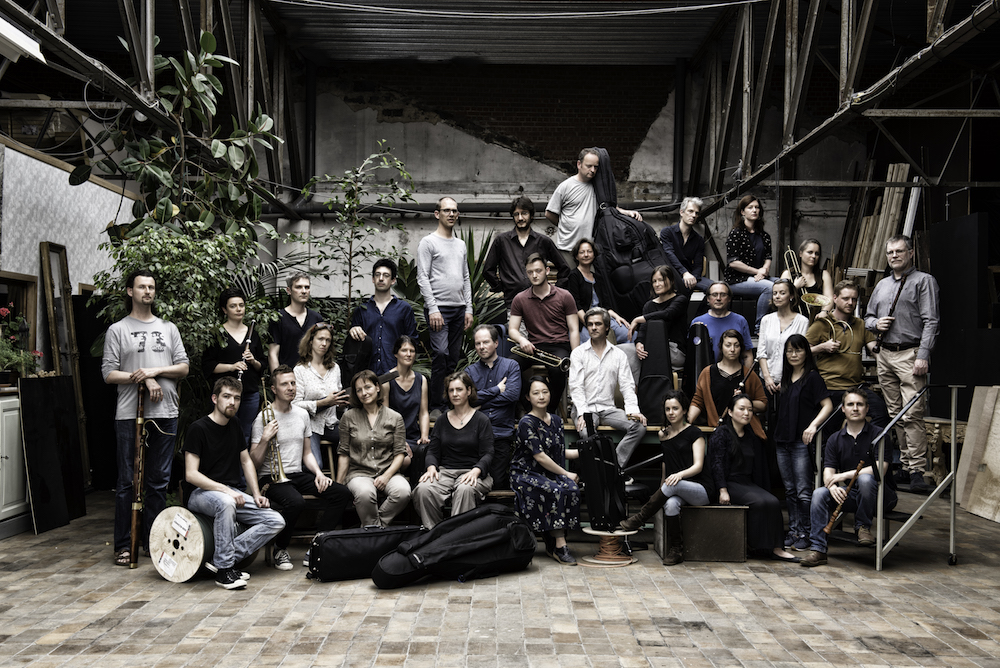
B'Rock Orchestra in 2018

B'Rock Orchestra is a Belgian period ensemble created in Ghent in 2005. It combines works by established baroque composers like Johann Sebastian Bach, Antonio Vivaldi and Georg Friedrich Händel with the lesser-known repertoire of the 17th and 18th centuries like Georg Philipp Telemann, Alessandro Scarlatti and Giovanni Battista Pergolesi. In addition, the orchestra focuses on giving first performances of new music written with its historic instruments in mind. The orchestra also has a reputation for cross-genre productions like Early Music in combination with theatre, opera, visual art, dance and/or video.

== History ==
The orchestra was set up in Ghent in 2005 on the initiative of harpsichordist Frank Agsteribbe, double bass player Tom Devaere and managers Hendrik Storme and Tomas Bisschop. The basis was an urge for renewal in the world of Early Music. B'Rock Orchestra does not work with one conductor but engages guest conductors, soloists and choirs. The orchestra gives about 45 concerts every season, both in Belgium and abroad.

In 2012, B'Rock Orchestra made its debut at Royal Opera De Munt/La Monnaie in Brussels with the opera Orlando by Händel under the baton of René Jacobs. B'Rock was voted 'Ensemble of the Year 2015' by the Belgian classical radio channel Klara.

B'Rock Orchestra has developed long-term links with production and presentation partners such as DE SINGEL International Arts Centre (Antwerp, BE), Muziektheater Transparant (Antwerpen, BE), KASK & Conservatorium Ghent (BE), International Opera Academy (Ghent, BE), and Opéra de Rouen (FR). They are regular guests at, among others, Concertgebouw Brugge (BE), Muziekcentrum De Bijloke (Ghent, BE), Bozar (Brussels, BE), Concertgebouw and Muziekgebouw aan 't IJ Amsterdam (NL), Amare Den Haag (NL), Kölner Philharmonie (DE), Beethovenfest Bonn (DE), and Opéra Grand Avignon (FR).

== Recordings ==
- 2008: Georg Philipp Telemann Suites for Strings
- 2009: Georg Friedrich Händel Concerti grossi, Ouvertures
- 2010: David Petersen Speelstukken
- 2011: Vivaldi/Cage 8 Seasons
- 2014: Georg Friedrich Händel Orlando with René Jacobs
- 2015: Georg Friedrich Händel Der Messias with Peter Dijkstra
- 2018: Franz Peter Schubert Symphonies 1 & 6 with René Jacobs
- 2020: Franz Peter Schubert Symphonies 2 & 3 with René Jacobs
- 2021: Franz Peter Schubert Symphonies 4 & 5 with René Jacobs
- 2022: Franz Peter Schubert Unfinished and Great Symphonies with René Jacobs
- 2022: Philippus van Steelant Antwerp Requiem c. 1650 with CantoLX en Frank Agsteribbe
- 2023: Georg Friedrich Händel Water & Fire with Dmitri Sinkovsky
- 2024: Box set of the complete Schubert recordings with René Jacobs
