= Lotario (Handel) =

Opera seria in three acts by Handel

George Frideric Handel

Lotario ("Lothair", HWV 26) is an opera seria in three acts by George Frideric Handel. The Italian-language libretto was adapted from Antonio Salvi's Adelaide.The opera was first given at the King's Theatre in London on 2 December 1729.

The story of the opera is a fictionalisation of some events in the life of Holy Roman Empress Adelaide of Italy.

== Performance history ==
Paolo Rolli commented in a letter at the time to Giuseppe Riva that "everyone thinks (Lotario) a very bad opera". There were 10 performances, but it was not repeated. Handel reused pieces in later operas.

As with all Baroque opera seria, Lotario went unperformed for many years, but with the revival of interest in Baroque music and historically informed musical performance since the 1960s, Lotario, like all Handel operas, receives performances at festivals and opera houses today. Among other performances, Lotario was staged at the London Handel Festival in 1999, by the Handel Festival, Halle in 2004 and by the Stadttheater Bern, Switzerland, in 2019.

== Roles ==
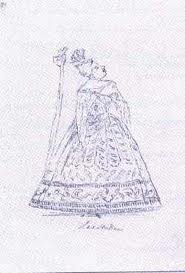
Caricature of Anna Maria Strada, who created the role of Adelaide

Roles, voice types, and premiere cast
Role	Voice type	Premiere Cast, 2 December 1729
Adelaide	soprano	Anna Maria Strada del Pò
Lotario	alto castrato	Antonio Maria Bernacchi
Berengario, Duke of Spoleto	tenor	Annibale Pio Fabri, called "Balino"
Matilde, Berengario's wife	contralto	Antonia Merighi
Idelberto, Berengario's son	contralto	Francesca Bertolli
Clodomiro, Berengario's general	bass	Johann Gottfried Riemschneider

== Synopsis ==
- Scene:Italy, about 950.

Before the action begins, Berengario had ruled Italy together with Adelaide's husband, but desiring all the power for himself, Berengario had Adelaide's husband poisoned and then tried to force her to marry his son Idelberto, who loves her. Adelaide refused, and now, as Queen of Italy, she has taken refuge in a fortress in Pavia.

=== Act 1 ===
Berengario is full of ambition and rage and has sent his son Idelberto to storm the walls of Pavia. He receives news that the German King Lotario is on his way with an army to protect Adelaide. Matilde, Berengario's wife and fully his match in ambition and rage, announces that she has bribed Adelaide's soldiers to open the gates of Pavia to their forces. Her son is truly in love with Adelaide and begs his parents not to do anything that will endanger her, but Matilde will not be moved - Adelaide must marry Idelberto or face death.

In the castle at Pavia, Adelaide receives the German King Lotario, who has not only brought his army to her aid but loves her too. She accepts his aid and urges him to fight Berengario and Matilde. He will do so, he says, if she will repay him with her love (Aria:Rammentati, cor mio). Clorimondo, Berengario's general, appears to Adelaide and tells her she must either marry the son or be killed by the father (Aria:Se il mar promette calma) but Adelaide puts her trust in Lotario (Aria:Quel cor che mi donasti).

Berengario takes Pavia easily owing to the treachery of Adelaide's troops but she adamantly refuses to marry his son. Berengario goes to fight Lotario's army, leaving Adelaide with his wife Matilde, who loads her with chains and throws her in the dungeon.

=== Act 2 ===
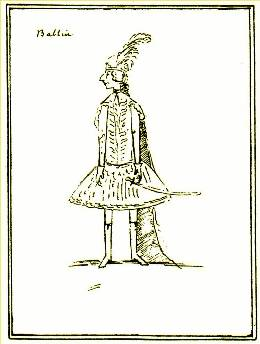
A contemporary caricature of Annibale Pio Fabri, who created the role of Berengario

Berengario loses the battle against Lotario and is captured. He is a prisoner of war, and Lotario reflects that he is a prisoner to love.

In the dungeon, Adelaide is also a prisoner and does not realise that Lotario has defeated her enemy. Clorimondo enters with a crown in one hand and a vial of poison in the other - Adelaide can choose to be Idelberto's queen, or die. Adelaide, egged on by Matilde, chooses the poison and is about to swallow it when Idelberto bursts into the prison cell. He tries to rescue Adelaide but is prevented by his mother. When Adelaide is once again about to swallow the poison, Idelberto draws his dagger and threatens to kill himself, whereupon Matilde dashes the poisoned drink from Adelaide's hands. Matilde is not happy about this outcome however and warns her son to expect pain and Adelaide to look forward to punishment (Aria:Arma lo sguardo). Left alone together, Adelaide thanks Idelberto for saving her but says she can never love him. Idelberto accepts this and proclaims he will be content to admire her from a distance (Aria:Bella, non mi negar.) Adelaide is touched and grateful for his devotion (Aria: D'una torbida sorgente).

=== Act 3 ===
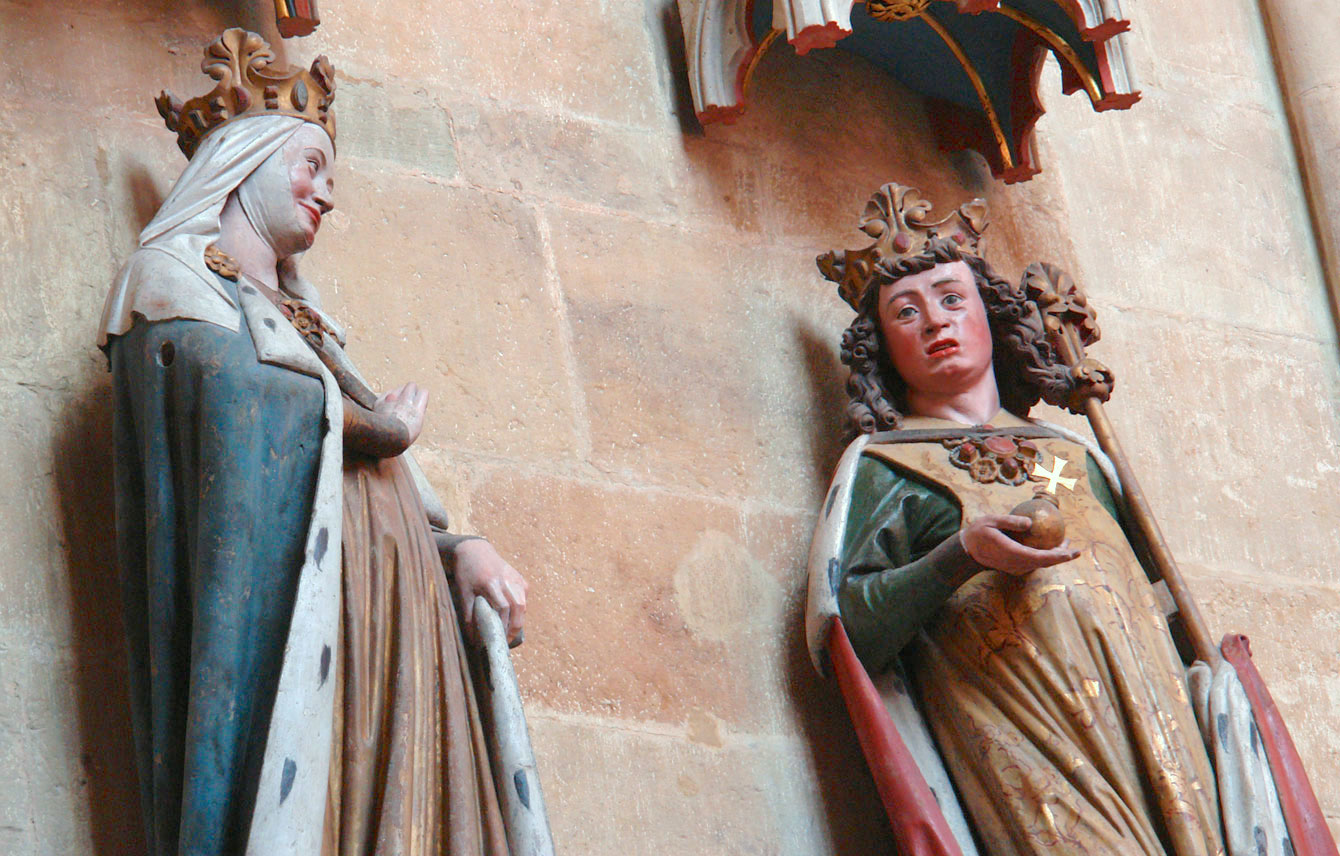
Statues of Adelaide and her second spouse Otto I the Great (called Lotario in the opera) at the Meissen Cathedral

In captivity, Berengario and Matilde appeal to Adelaide to stop the war by using her influence with Lotario to have them crowned king and queen of Italy. Adelaide refuses.

Berengario is beginning to regret his cruelty, but Matilde is made of sterner stuff. The two armies rush into battle, and Lotario seeing that Adelaide is in danger, calls a truce. Idelberto offers to die instead of Adelaide, however his father will not accept this, so the fighting starts again.

Clorimondo worries that he may have backed the losing side in this struggle and reflects on the transitory nature of human fortunes (Aria:Alza al ciel).

Idelberto discovers his mother arming herself for battle, ready to fight alongside her troops. He begs her not to, but she scornfully refuses to listen to her son express such cowardice. Clorimundo enters with the news that the battle is over and Lotario has won. The enraged Matilde accuses her son of causing this defeat and orders Adelaide brought to her so that she can kill her with her own hands but is told that Adelaide has already been released. Idelberto suggests to his mother that she kill him instead which strikes Matilde as a good idea, but she cannot quite bring herself to do it. The victorious Lotario enters and orders Matilde arrested whereupon she tries to commit suicide but is prevented.

Lotario lets Adelaide decide what is to become of Berengario and Matilde. Adelaide shows them forgiveness; they will be allowed to live in quiet retirement, while out of gratitude for saving her life, Idelberto will be King of Italy. Lotario and Adelaide will marry and rule Germany. They celebrate their love for one another (Duet: Sì, bel sembiante).

== Context and analysis ==
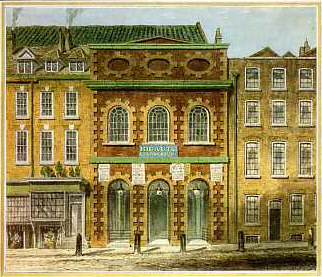
The King's Theatre, London, where Lotario had its first performance

The German-born Handel, after spending some of his early career composing operas and other pieces in Italy, settled in London, where in 1711 he had brought Italian opera for the first time with his opera Rinaldo. A tremendous success, Rinaldo created a craze in London for Italian opera seria, a form focused overwhelmingly on solo arias for the star virtuoso singers. In 1719, Handel was appointed music director of an organisation called the Royal Academy of Music (unconnected with the present day London conservatoire), a company under royal charter to produce Italian operas in London. Handel was not only to compose operas for the company but hire the star singers, supervise the orchestra and musicians, and adapt operas from Italy for London performance.

The Royal Academy of Music collapsed at the end of the 1728–29 season, partly due to the huge fees paid to the star singers, and the two prima donnas who had appeared in Handel's last few operas, Francesca Cuzzoni and Faustina Bordoni both left London for engagements in continental Europe. Handel went into partnership with John James Heidegger, the theatrical impresario who held the lease on the King's Theatre in the Haymarket where the operas were presented and started a new opera company with a new prima donna, Anna Strada. One of Handel's librettists, Paolo Rolli, wrote in a letter (the original is in Italian) that Handel said that Strada "sings better than the two who have left us, because one of them (Faustina) never pleased him at all and he would like to forget the other (Cuzzoni)." The story of Lotario is, in modern terms, a "prequel" to Handel's previous opera Ottone with many of the same characters at an earlier part of their lives. In fact, the character of Lotario was referred to in Handel's manuscript score as "Ottone" since it is based on the same person, the historical Otto the Great, but the name was changed part way through composition, probably to avoid confusion with Handel's earlier, highly successful, piece.

Handel was now in business for himself, unlike the arrangements he had with the Royal Academy of Music, which had financial support from wealthy backers. He had traveled to Italy to hire singers and the ones he brought to London to replace the stars of the Royal Academy did not meet with the near universal acclaim of his previous singers. One of Handel's most loyal supporters, Mary Delany, wrote in a letter of the new ensemble of singers that performed Lotario

Bernachi has a vast compass, his voice mellow and clear, but not so sweet as Senesino, his manner better; his person not so good, for he is as big as a Spanish friar. Fabri has a tenor voice, sweet, clear and firm, but not strong enough, I doubt, for the stage; he sings like a gentleman, without making faces, and his manner is particularly agreeable; he is the greatest master of musick that ever sang on the stage. The third is the bass, a very good distinct voice, without any harshness. La Strada is the first woman; her voice is without exception fine, her manner perfection, but her person very bad, and she makes frightful mouths. La Merighi is next to her; her voice is not extraordinarily good or bad, she is tall and has a very graceful person, with a tolerable face; she seems to be a woman about forty, she sings easily and agreeably. The last is Bertoli, she has neither voice, ear, nor manner to recommend her; but she is a perfect beauty, quite a Cleopatra, that sort of complexion with regular features, fine teeth, and when she sings has a smile about her mouth which is extreme pretty, and I believe has practised to sing before a glass, for she has never any distortion in her face.

In the same letter already quoted, on 11 December 1729 Paulo Rolli wrote:

Nine days ago the opera Lotario was produced. I went only last Tuesday, that is to the third performance. Everyone considers it a very bad opera. Bernacchi failed to please on the first night, but at the second performance he changed his method and scored a success...Strada pleases mightily, and (Handel) says that she sings better than the two who have left us, because one of them never pleased him at all and he would like to forget the other...Fabri is a great success. He really sings very well. Would you have believed that a tenor could have such a triumph here in England?...They are putting on Giulio Cesare because the audiences are falling away fast. I think the storm is about to break on the head of our proud Orso (Handel). Not all beans are for market, especially beans so badly cooked as this first basketful...

Tenors were unusual in leading roles in opera in England, as Rolli notes, although Handel's previous operas Tamerlano and Rodelinda had featured star roles for a celebrated tenor, Francesco Borosini.

A few weeks after her first letter, Mary Delaney returned to the subject (The Beggar's Opera had been a sensational success at its premiere in London in 1728):

'The opera is too good for the vile taste of the town; it (Lotario) is condemned never more to appear on the stage after this night...The present opera is disliked because it is too much studied, and they love nothing but minuets and ballads, in short the Beggars' Opera and Hurlothrumbo are only worthy of applause.

The opera is scored for two oboes, two bassoons, trumpet, two horns, strings, and continuo (cello, lute, harpsichord).

== Recordings ==
Lotario discography
Year	Cast: Lotario, Adelaide, Berengario, Matilda Clodomiro	Conductor, orchestra	Label
2003	Lawrence Zazzo, Nuria Rial, Andreas Karasiak, Annette Markert, Hubert Claessens	Paul Goodwin; Kammerorchester Basel	CD:Oehms Classics; Cat:OC 902 (highlights)
2004	Sara Mingardo, Simone Kermes, Steve Davislim, Hilary Summers, Sonia Prina, Vito Priante	Alan Curtis; Il Complesso Barocco	CD:Deutsche Harmonia Mundi; Cat:82875 58797-2
2017	Sophie Rennert, Marie Lys, Jorge Navarro-Colorado, Ursula Hesse von den Steinen, Todd Boyce	Laurence Cummings; FestspielOrchester Göttingen	CD:Accent Records; Cat:ACC26408
