= Francesco Antonio Pistocchi =

Italian singer, composer and librettist (1659–1726)

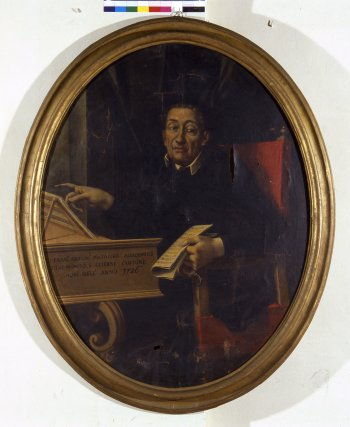
Pistocchi

Francesco Antonio Mamiliano Pistocchi, nicknamed Pistocchino (1659 – 13 May 1726), was an Italian singer, composer and librettist.

Pistocchino was born in Palermo. He was a boy soprano prodigy, and later made his career as a castrato. From 1696 to 1700 he was maestro di cappella for the Duke of Ansbach.

After 1700, he founded a singing school in Bologna, where he died. He was elected president of the Academia Filarmonica twice, in 1708 and 1710.

His pupil was Annibale Pio Fabri.

== Works ==
- Il Leandro (libretto by Camillo Badovero, Venice, Teatro alle Zattere, 5 May 1679, then Teatro S. Moisè, 1682, as Gli amori fatali)
- Il Narciso, pastorale (Apostolo Zeno Ansbach Court Theatre, March 1697)
- Le pazzie d'amore e dell'interesse, (own libretto, Ansbach, 16 June 1699)
- Le risa di Democrito (Nicolò Minato, Vienna, 17 February 1700)
- La pace tra l'armi, serenata (own libretto, Ansbach 5 Sept. 1700)

. Bertoldo (1707)

- I rivali generosi, dramma per musica (Apostolo Zeno, Reggio Emilia, April 1710), composed with Clemente Monati and Giovanni Maria Capelli

== Oratorios ==
. Il Martirio di San Adriano (Venice,1699) . Maria Vergine Addolorata (1698) . La fuga di Sta. Teresia (1717)

== Other works ==
. Scherzi Musicali (collection of French, Italian and German arias) . Duetti e terzetti(1707) . 147th psalm and other church music and cantatas . Cappricci puerili variamente composti in 40 modi sopra un basso d'un balletto (pieces for the harpsichord, harp, violin and other instruments 1667)

== Recordings ==
- Oratorio San Adriano Symphonia
