= Celeste Gismondi =

Italian soprano opera singer

Celeste Gismondi (fl. 1722 – died 11 March 1735), originally known as Celeste Resse and nicknamed La Celestina ("The Heavenly"), was an Italian soprano opera singer, who performed a major role in the première of some works by George Frideric Handel, including Orlando.

== Biography ==
It is unknown when Gismondi was born. The suggestion that Gismondi, about whom nothing was knowing prior to her arrival in London in 1732, was the same as Resse, was first proposed by Strohm in 1985 (R. Strohm, Essays on Handel and Italian opera, Cambridge).

The first traces we find of the career of Resse was in Naples in April 1722, where she sang in the Teatro dei Fiorentini in the comedic opera La noce de Veneviento by Francesco Feo. She performed later the same year in Lo castiello saccheato, and in 1723 in Lo labborinto, both by Leonardo Vinci. Because her name didn't appear in the original programmes for the operas, it has been speculated that she was still a minor at the time, placing her birth in the first decade of the 1700s.

She then moved in 1725 to the Teatro San Bartolomeo in Naples, where the more serious opera's were staged. There she sang in most productions until early 1732, often together with the bass Gioacchino Corrado; she replaced Santa Marchesini who had moved to Venice. During these years Resse sang the comic interludes in opera's by Johann Adolf Hasse, Leonardo Leo, Giovanni Battista Pergolesi, and Vinci.

John Hervey, 2nd Baron Hervey saw her in Naples in 1729 and probably played a significant role in bringing her to London, where she was under the name Celeste Gismondi the second singer in the company of George Frideric Handel at the Queen's Theatre, where Anna Maria Strada was the prima donna. The first known performance was in November 1732, in the pasticchio opera Catone. After one season she went to the Opera of the Nobility, the new rival company set up by Nicola Porpora, where she performed as prima or secunda donna during the 1733–34 season.

She was married to a Mr. Hempson. She died in London on 11 March 1735, having fallen ill after the 1733–1734 season.

== Performances ==
=== Naples ===
- 1722: Francesco Feo, La noce de Veneviento
- 1722: Leonardo Vinci, Lo castiello saccheato
- 1723: Vinci, Lo labborinto
- 1726: Johann Adolf Hasse, Il Sesostrate
- 1727: Vinci, Stratonica
- 1729: Hasse, Tigrane
- 1732: Francesco Mancini, Alessandro nell' Indie

=== London ===
All works in London during the 1732–1733 season composed by George Frideric Handel unless otherwise noted: date of first performance noted only.

- 4 November 1732: Catone (opera)
- 25 November 1732: Alessandro (opera). Role: Lisaura
- 5 December 1732: Acis and Galatea (serenata)
- 2 January 1733: Tolomeo (opera). Role: Elisa
- 27 January 1733: Orlando (opera). Role: Dorinda
- 3 March 1733: Floridante (opera)
- 17 March 1733: Deborah (oratorio). Role: Jael
- 14 April 1733: Esther (oratorio)
- 22 May 1733: Giovanni Bononcini, Griselda (opera)

All works in the 1733–1734 season composed by Nicola Porpora unless otherwise noted.

- 1733: Arianna in Nasso (opera)
- 1733: Carlo Arrigoni, Ferdinando (opera)
- 1734: Enia nel Lazio (opera)
- 1734: Davide e Bersabea (oratorio)
- 1734: Giovanni Bononcini, Astarto (opera)
