= Philippus van Steelant =

Flemish composer

Philippus van Steelant (1611-1670) was an organist and composer at St. James' Church, Antwerp, Belgium.

== Recordings ==
- 2022: Philippus van Steelant Antwerp Requiem c. 1650 CantoLX, B'Rock, Pentatone
