= Didone abbandonata (Sarro) =

Opera by Domenico Sarro

The final scene in Metastasio's libretto, Didone Abandonata, by Cecilio Rizzardini

Didone abbandonata (Dido Abandoned) is an opera in three acts composed by Domenico Sarro to a libretto by Pietro Metastasio of the same name which was based on the story of Dido and Aeneas from the fourth book of Virgil's Aeneid. The opera premiered on 1 February 1724 at the Teatro San Bartolomeo in Naples.

== Background and performance history ==
Didone abbandonata was Metastasio's first original libretto, and Sarro's opera was the first of what were to be more than fifty musical settings of the work. The opera premiered at the Teatro San Bartolomeo in Naples on 1 February 1724 along with a two-part comic intermezzo also composed by Sarro to a libretto by Metastasio, L'impresario delle Isole Canarie. Didone abbandonata was Sarro's sixteenth opera composed for the theatres in Naples and is considered an important example of his mature style.

The title role was sung in the premiere by Marianna Bulgarelli, famed for her talent as an actress. Bulgarelli was also the patron and mistress of the young Metastasio, who was living in her home while he wrote Didone. He intended it as a showcase for her, and according to contemporary accounts, Bulgarelli had considerable influence on the work, especially in shaping Dido's scenes of jealousy in act 2. Marianna Bulgarelli and her Aeneas, Nicolo Grimaldi, reprised their roles on 26 December 1724 at the Teatro San Cassiano in Venice for the premiere of Tomaso Albinoni's setting of the libretto, and again on 10 May 1725 in Reggio Emilia for the premiere of Nicola Porpora's setting.

The premiere of Sarro's Didone was very successful, with contemporary accounts reporting the audience deeply moved. The opera was given a second run later that year at the Teatro San Bartolomeo and played in several other opera houses in Italy. Sarro revised the opera (with a text adapted from Metastasio's by Giovanni Boldini) for its Venice premiere on 24 November 1730 at the Teatro San Giovanni Grisostomo. On that occasion, Nicolo Grimaldi again sang the role of Aeneas, but Didone was sung by Lucia Facchinelli. The revised version was dedicated to Gustavus Hamilton, 2nd Viscount Boyne who was in the audience that night. The opera was also performed in Brno in the autumn of 1734, and its revival at the Teatro San Bartolomeo in 1737 was the theatre's last opera performance before it gave way to the newly built Teatro San Carlo.

Eventually Sarro's opera fell into obscurity and there are no recordings of the complete work. However, on 23 September 2005, a shortened concert version was performed at the Schloss Elisabethenburg in Meiningen by the ensemble Les Amis de Philippe conducted by Ludger Rémy, a live recording of which was broadcast on MDR radio the following year. Several copies of the manuscript score are held in the San Pietro a Majella conservatory in Naples.

== Roles ==
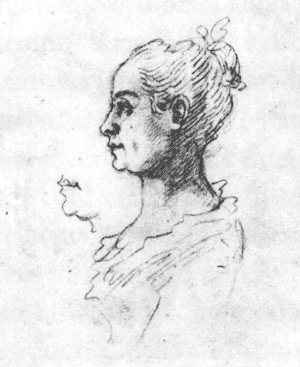
Marianna Bulgarelli, who created the title role of Didone abandonata

Roles, voice types, premiere cast
| Role | Voice type | Premiere cast 1 February 1724 |
|---|---|---|
| Didone, Dido, queen of Carthage, in love with Enea | soprano | Marianna Bulgarelli |
| Enea, Aeneas, a Trojan hero | alto castrato | Nicolò Grimaldi |
| Iarba, Iarbas king of the Moors, who appears as "Arbace" | contralto (en travesti) | Antonia Margherita Merighi |
| Selene, sister of Dido and secretly in love with Aeneas | soprano | Benedetta Sorosina |
| Araspe, confidant of Iarba and lover of Selene | tenor | Annibale Pio Fabri |
| Osmida, confidant of Dido | contralto (en travesti) | Caterina Levi |

== Synopsis ==
Setting: Ancient Carthage

Dido (Didone), Queen of Carthage, had been promised in marriage to King Iarbas (Iarba), but fell in love with the Trojan warrior Aeneas (Enea), who had been shipwrecked on the shores of her city. Iarbas appears disguised as "Arbace" to warn Dido that Aeneas cannot become King of Carthage. Nevertheless, Dido refuses to marry Iarbas. Although Aeneas is now in love with Dido, he asks her sister Selene to tell her of his plans to leave Carthage for Italy. War then breaks out between Aeneas and Iarbas in which the Trojan is triumphant. After his victory, Dido convinces Aeneas to remain in Carthage and become her husband. But when the ghost of Aeneas' father reminds him of his duty to his people, Aeneas realises that he must abandon Dido. Heartbroken, she commits suicide as Aeneas and his men set sail for Italy.
