= Deborah (Handel) =

Oratorio by Georg Friedrich Händel

George Frideric Handel

Deborah (HWV 51) is an oratorio by George Frideric Handel. It was one of Handel's early oratorios in English and was based on a libretto by Samuel Humphreys. It received its premiere performance at the King's Theatre in London on 17 March 1733.

The story of the oratorio takes place in a single day and is based on the Biblical stories found in 4 and 5 Judges. The Israelites have been subjugated for 20 years by the Canaanites, when the prophetess Deborah foretells the death of the Canaanite commander Sisera at the hands of a woman. The Israelite commander Barak leads them into battle against the Canaanites. The Israelites are victorious and a woman, Jael, assassinates Sisera as he sleeps in her tent.

Handel reused music from numerous previous compositions for Deborah. The work, with large choruses and grand orchestral effects, was very successful and was revived by Handel in subsequent years.

== Background ==
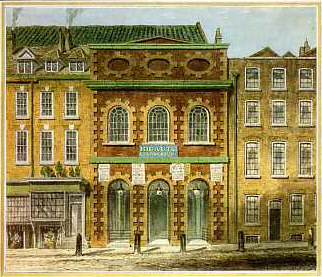
London King's Theatre Haymarket, where "Deborah" was first performed

By 1733, Handel had spent nearly twenty years composing and presenting seasons of Italian opera in London. The great success of Esther the previous year had shown Handel that there was potential for further works of "Sacred Drama", performed in concert form in English. Deborah reuses much music Handel had previously composed, including passages from the Brockes Passion, Il trionfo del tempo e del disinganno, the Dixit Dominus, and others. Deborah was performed as part of Handel's season at the King's Theatre in 1733, with the stars of the Italian opera singing in English, and the composer / impresario was so confident of the work's success that he doubled the price of admission for the first performance, causing some resentment and comment in the press. A feature of the work is massive choruses, some in eight parts rather than the usual four, and grandiose orchestral effects featuring trumpets and drums. One witness to the first performances noted "It is very magnificent, near a hundred performers, among whom about twenty-five singers" while another remarked "'tis excessive noisy, a vast number of voices and instruments, who all perform at a time."Deborah achieved considerable popularity and was revived by Handel in a number of subsequent seasons.

== Dramatis personae ==
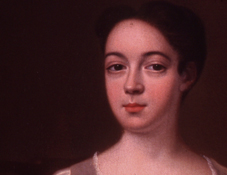
Painting from the 1730s of singer who created roles in Handel operas and oratorios, Anna Maria Strada, creator of the role of Deborah

Roles, voice types, and premiere cast
Role	Voice	1733 cast
Deborah	soprano	Anna Maria Strada
Barak, commander of the Israelite army	alto-castrato	Senesino
Abinoam	bass	Antonio Montagnana
Sisera	alto	Francesca Bertolli
Jael	soprano	Celeste Gismondi
An Israelite Woman	soprano	Celeste Gismondi
Chief Priest of Israelites	bass	Antonio Montagnana
Chief Priest of Baal	bass	Gustavus Waltz
Herald	tenor	
Chorus of the Priests and Israelites		
Chorus of the Priests of Baal		

== Synopsis ==
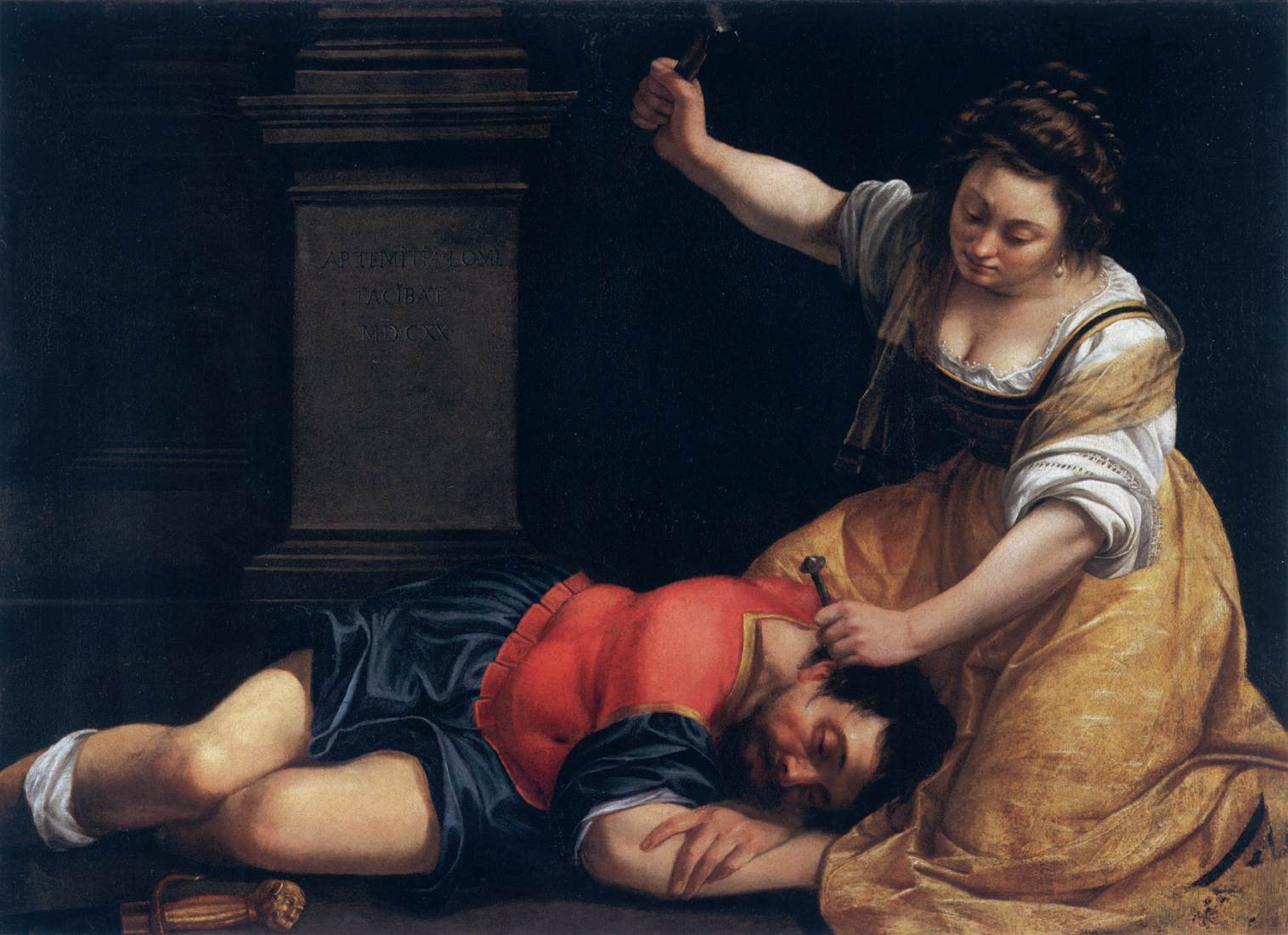
Jael killing Sisera, by Artemisia Gentileschi

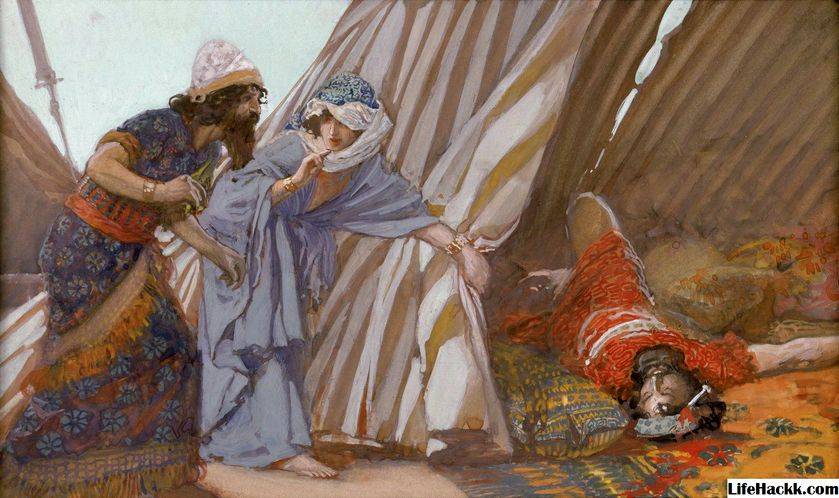
Jael shows the slain Sisera to Barak, by James Tissot

=== Act 1 ===
The Israelites long for a leader who will deliver them from the oppression of the Canaanites. The prophetess and Judge, Deborah, exhorts Barak, head of the Israelite army, to save the country from subjugation and lead an army against General Sisera, commander of the Canaanite forces. Deborah prophesies that Sisera will meet death at the hands of a woman. Jael, presented in the oratorio as a female associate of Deborah, longs for security in her homeland. The father of Barak, Abinoam, adds his voice to those asking Barak to lead an army against their oppressors. A herald arrives from Sisera, announcing the General's arrival to explain the dire consequences that will fall on the Israelites should they attack, but Deborah, Barak and their people are confident that victory will be theirs.

=== Act 2 ===
Sisera and priests of Baal arrive to counsel the Israelites not to attack but Deborah and Barak reject the possibility that the God of Israel will not conquer. Abinoam looks forward with pride to his son Barak's victory, and Deborah advises her friend Jael to retire to her tent during the upcoming battle. The Israelites are confident that God will aid their arms.

=== Act 3 ===
The Israelites have defeated the greatly superior forces of the Canaanites. Abinoam joyfully welcomes his victorious son back from battle. Jael announces that Sisera is dead, and relates how the defeated general sought refreshment and rest in her tent. Jael brought him milk, and when he had fallen asleep, she took a hammer and drove nails through his skull. All acclaim her action and celebrate the nation's deliverance.

== Recordings ==
Deborah discography
Year	Cast:Deborah, Barak, Abinoam, Sisera, Jael	Conductor, orchestra and chorus	Label
1993	Yvonne Kenny, James Bowman, Michael George, Catherine Denley, Susan Gritton	Robert King; The King's Consort and Choir of New College, Oxford	CD:Hyperion Records; Cat:CDA66841-2
2002	Elisabeth Scholl, Lawrence Zazzo, Jelle S.Draijer, Ewa Wolak, Natacha Ducret	Joachim Carlos Martini; Barockorchester Frankfurt and the Junge Kantorei	CD: Naxos; Cat:8.554785-87
