= Polifemo (opera) =

Opera by Nicola Porpora about the cyclops Polyphemus

- opera seria by Nicola Porpora
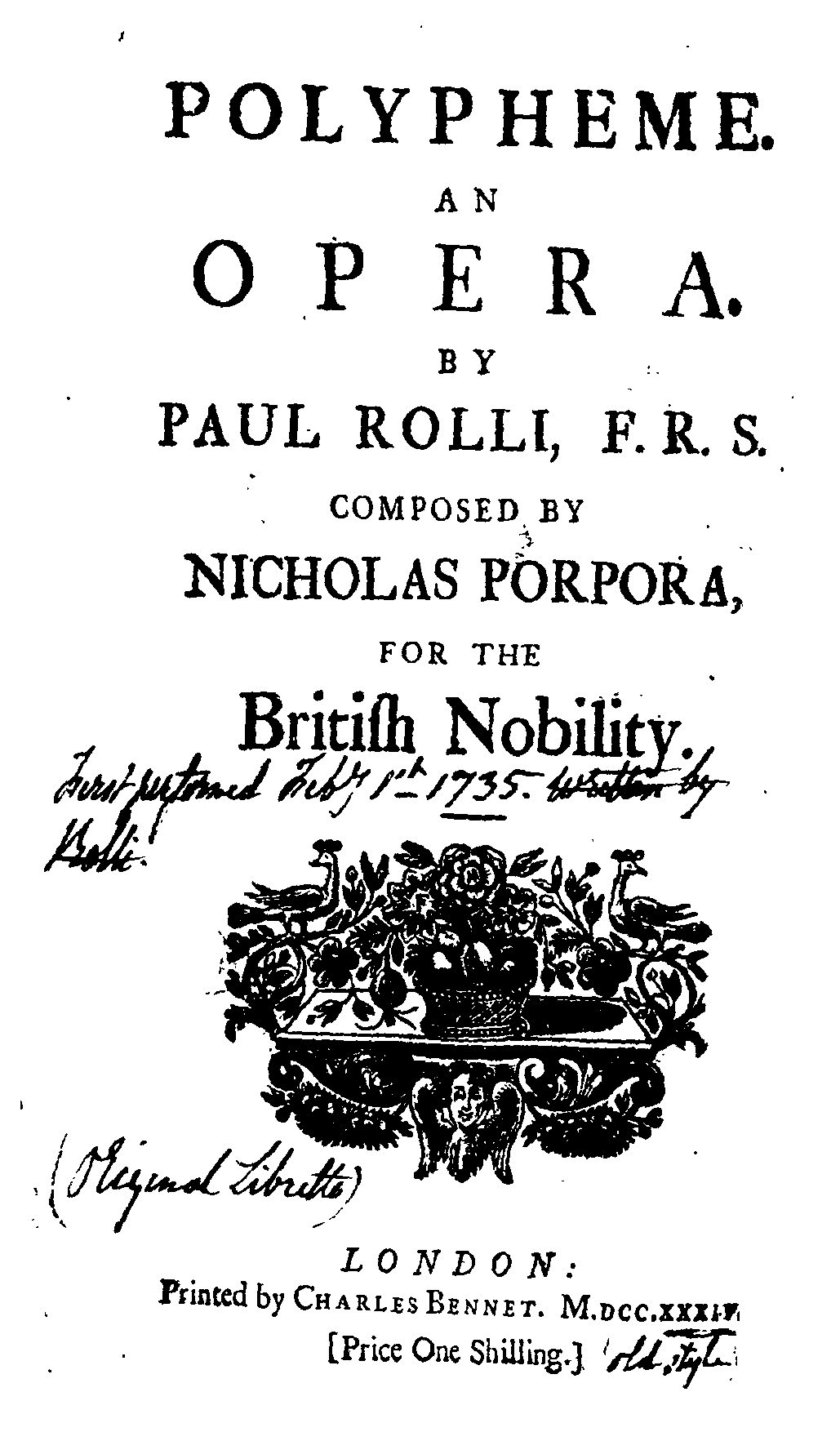
- English title page of the revised version of Nicola Porpora's opera Polifemo
- Translation: Polyphemus
- Librettist: Paolo Rolli
- Language: Italian
- Based on: Metamorphoses by Ovid
- Premiere: February 1, 1735; King's Theatre

Polifemo is an opera in three acts by Nicola Porpora with a libretto by Paolo Rolli. The opera is based on a combination of two mythological stories involving the cyclops Polyphemus: His killing of Acis and his blinding by Ulysses.

The last of five operas Porpora composed while residing in London, the opera premiered on 1 February 1735 at King's Theatre, and featured the famed castrato singers Farinelli and Senesino. Polifemo was Porpora's second-most popular opera, after his Arianna in Nasso.

== Background ==
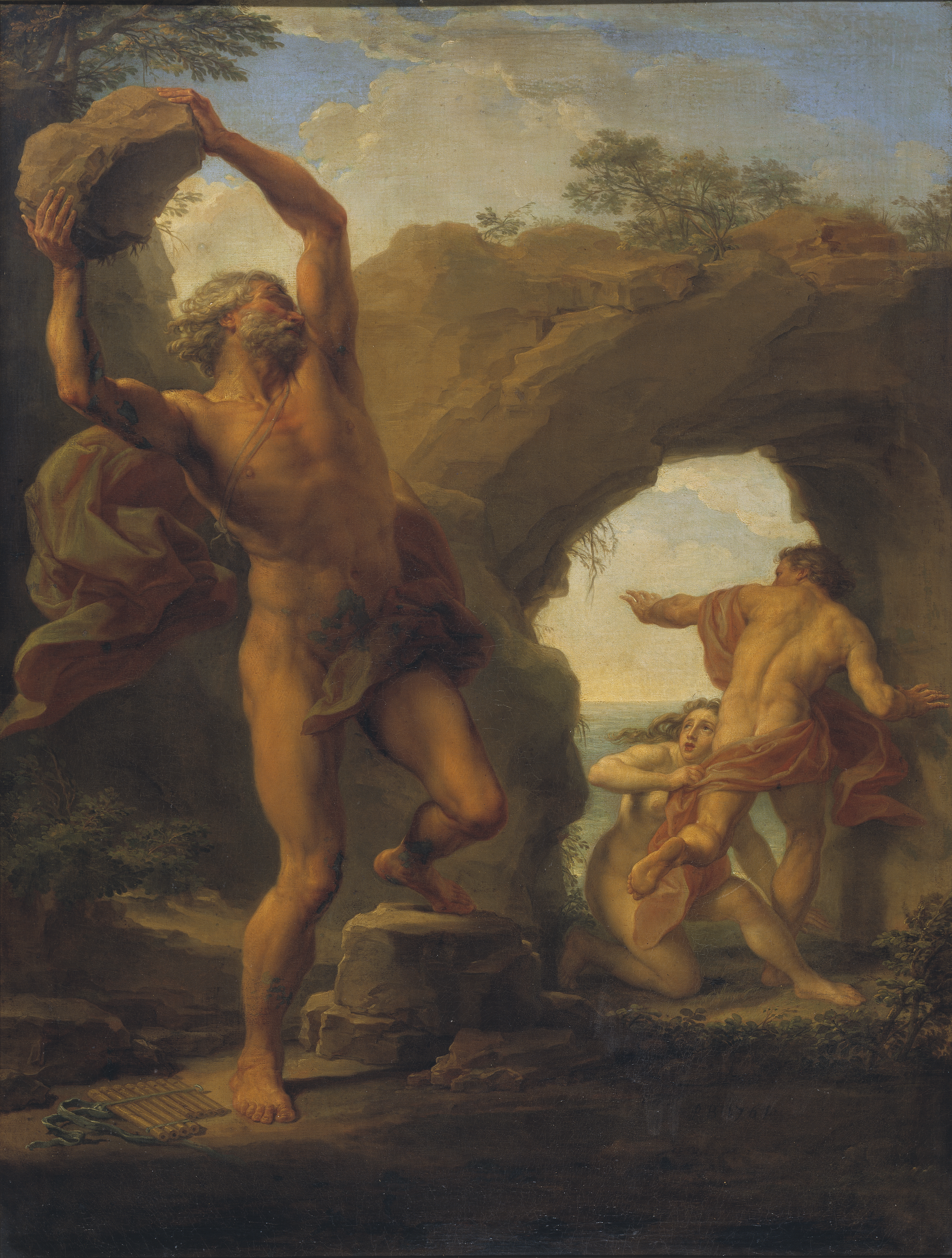
Polythemus about to kill Acis who runs from Galathea; painting by Pompeo Batoni (1761) in the collection of the Nationalmuseum

The beginning of the eighteenth century saw the rise of Italian culture in London. Not only was Italian literature popular, but there was a "sudden craze for Italian opera". Among the many creative energies of Italian creators in the 18th century it was felt that opera best encapsulated the principles of neoclassicism. Italian opera had been presented in London as early as 1705 with Thomas Clayton's Arsinoe, Queen of Cyprus. The success of George Frideric Handel's first Italian opera for London, Rinaldo of 1711 and three subsequent operas led to the formation in 1720 of the Royal Academy of Music, a company devoted to presenting Italian opera at King's Theatre. Despite the financial stability due in large part to backing from King George I, the company collapsed in 1728, probably due to a combination of high fees for star singers as well as the changing tastes of the public, who had made The Beggar's Opera (first performed 29 January 1728) a hit. Handel and his impresario John Jacob Heidegger were able to start a Second Royal Academy of Music in 1729. This second company was based on a subscription model. Although it started out moderately, its success grew with the re-engagement of Senesino, the castrato who had successfully performed in Handel's Italian operas of the "first" Royal Academy of Music. Beginning in 1731, Handel began to incorporate English into his operas. In 1732 there had been a pirated version of his Acis and Galatea. Handel responded with a new production in while interpolating Italian arias from his dramatic cantata of 1708, Aci, Galatea e Polifemo. While Handel did not abandon Italian opera entirely, he was aware of the public's changing tastes, moving away from heroic plots towards more magical elements while stretching the boundaries of opera seria.

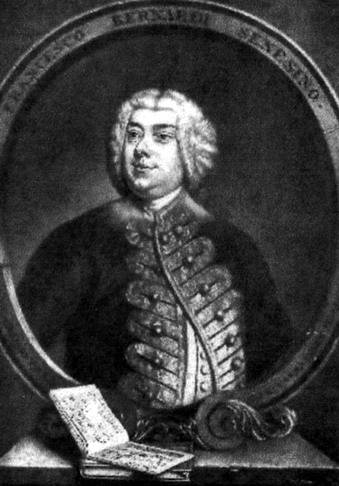
Senesino in 1735, the year of Polifemo's premiere

Though the castrato Senesino had often been featured in Handel's works, their relationship was fraught. The premiere of Handel's oratorio Deborah with prices in excess of what patrons would pay for an opera led to some consternation on the part of the public. It was also the culmination of disagreements between singer and composer. Senesino was fired a few weeks after the Deborah's premiere. In solidarity with her colleague, soprano Francesca Cuzzoni also left the company. Through appeals to the nobility, Senesino, under the patronage of Frederick, Prince of Wales, was able to create a second company to rival Handel's: The Opera of the Nobility. Nearly all of Handel's singers deserted his company for this new company including Antonio Montagnana and Francesca Bertolli. Porpora was invited to write operas for the company and Paolo Rolli was hired as the company's official poet/librettist. Securing the theatre at Lincoln's Inn Fields, their first production was Porpora's Arianna in Naxo with a libretto by Rolli, presented 29 December 1733.

For the 1734–35 season, Handel's company took up residence at Covent Garden, allowing the Opera of the Nobility to take over King's Theatre at Haymarket.

== Compositional history ==
Italian opera in London depended on bold dramatic and scenic effects along with occasionally pageantry which would in turn inspire composers to produce evocative music. Librettist Rolli favored mythological plots, based on French opera. This allowed for the incorporation of magic and supernatural effects, which opera of the time, typically based on historical incidents, would not allow. Musicologist Darryl Jacqueline Dumigan wrote that in his writing he was "able to push the boundaries of the static opera seria conventions with a greater freedom of structure that challenged the prevailing rigid formula of alternating action contained in secco rcitative with suspension aria."

The plot is drawn from two sources, Ovid's Metamorphoses (book XIII, 750) which involves Polyphemus, Acis and Galatea as well as Homer's Odyssey which involve Ulysses (the Roman name for Odysseus), Polyphemus and Calypso. Rolli's libretto differs from Homer. The librettist has Calipso (Calypso) helping Ulisse (Ulysses) to thwart Polifemo (Polyphemus). (In Homer the episode with Polyphemus occurs prior to Ulysses's encounter with Calypso who is determined to win over Ulysses.) Dumigan suggests that Rolli might have been aiming for more "dramatic truth." Despite Polifemo being an ugly and evil cyclops, he is allowed to show another side of his personality by revealing his despair at having lost his sight. Galatea, who loses immortality upon the death of Aci, is allowed to plead for her life, revealing more of a three-dimensional character.

== Performance history ==
After its premiere on 1 February 1735, Polifemo had eleven subsequent performances. The London Daily Post and General Advertiser wrote that it had attracted "one of the greatest audiences that hath been known this season." the work's final performance of the season was 7 June 1735.

A revised version of Polifemo opened the following season on 28 October 1735, and was received "with great applause by a numerous audience." The revision was necessitated in part by the arrival of the singer Santa Tasca from Italy, who assumed the part of Calipso from Bertolli. This revision lasted only three performance due to Farinelli's becoming too ill to perform. Its final performance took place on 4 November 1735. Thus in its first year, Polifemo had a total of 14 performances. It was the most successful of Porpora's London operas after the composer's first opera for London, Arianna in Nasso.

== Versions ==
There were two versions of Polifemo. One libretto is 61 pages and lacks the character of Nerea. The other libretto gives the date of 1734 but is actually from 1735 (since at that time the English reckoned the new year from 25 March), includes Nerea in a list of characters, and is 69 pages.

Based on her study of the published libretti, Darryl Jacqueline Dumigan believed the revised version of Polifemo is the one with the shorter libretto where the character of Nerea is eliminated. While this is possible, it would mean the arias Nell'attendere il mio bene and Alto Giove would be eliminated from the opera. Given the popularity of those arias based on numerous recent recordings, it seems unlikely that these showpieces would have been eliminated. Clarity on the different versions of Polifemo await further study.

The table below lists alterations between versions. (Scenes that do not involve alteration are not listed.)

Act / scene		Changes between first and second versions as found in the librettos
Act 1	scene 4	Nerea's recitative Giusta non à delle forze idea is cut as well as the following two lines of Calipso's recitative Amoroso Nerea and a few other adjustments; Calipso's aria Sorte un' umile capanna has a new text Vedrai che veglia il cielo
Act 2	scene 1	Nerea's and Calipso's recitative beginning Svolgere il corsoand Nerea's aria Una beltà che fa are cut
Act 2	scene 2	Calipso's aria Lascia fra tanti mali has new text Nel rigor d'avversa stella
Act 2	scene 3	Aci's aria Lusingato dall speme has new text Zeffiro lusinghier
Act 2	scene 5	Aci's aria Nell'attendere il mio bene has new text Dal guardo che incatena
Act 2	scene 6	Calipso has an additional aria Superato il disastro at the end of the scene
Act 2	scene 7	The final six lines of the Aci-Galatea duet Non possa mai ria sorte are cut
Act 3	scene 3	Calipso's aria Il gioir qualor s'aspetta has new text Ad altri sia più grato
Act 3	scene 4	Nerea's recitative Dal tormentoso is cut; her final line T'ascoltò Giove, ed annuì co'l ciglio is given to Calipso
Act 3	scene 5	Aci's aria Alto Giove is replaced by a duet for Aci and Galatea Immortale dal tuo sen; three lines of Galatea's recitative Deh vieni Aci immortale is cut
Act 3	scene 6	Two lines of Polifemo's recitative Ingiustissimi Dei! are cut; Galatea's aria Si che son quella sì is cut; Nerea's recitative Fra le vicende delle sorti umane and aria V'ingannate ninfe belle are cut
Act 3	scena ultima (scene 7)	The trio for Acis, Galatea and Ulisse Scherzino con le grazie is cut; the final chorus, a repetition of Accendi nuova face, is cut

== Synopsis ==
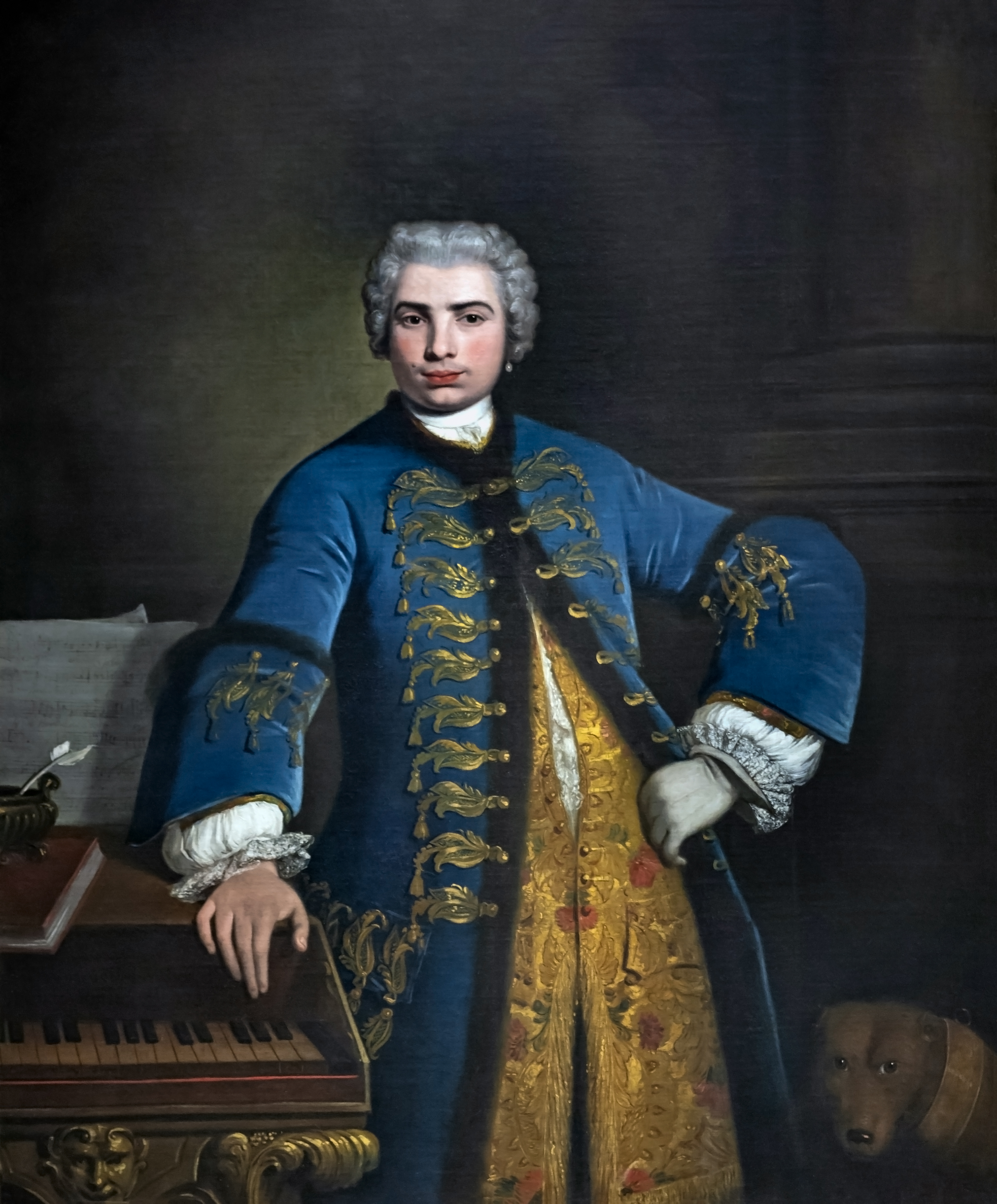
1734 portrait of Farinelli by Bartolomeo Nazari in the Royal College of Music London

=== Act 1 ===
Scene 1: A calm sea by the Sicilian shore, in sight of Mount Etna
The chorus sings of two goddesses (Vien bell'Aurora). Galatea and Calipso lament that they have fallen in love with mortals (Vo presagendo). As the chorus praises love (Febo tu ancora) Calipso leaves.

Scene 2: The same
Galatea's attempted exit is interrupted by Polifemo. He desires Galatea and wonders why she is not impressed with his pedigree (he is the son of Neptune) or his superhuman strength. Galatea states that she cannot love him. Polifemo responds that the flames in his heart are greater than those of Mount Etna (M'accendi 'n sen col guardo). Knowing of his tendency to rage and fury, Galatea wishes that he would understand she has fallen in love with the mortal Aci (Se al campo e al rio soggiorna).

Scene 3: The ships of Ulisse are seen in the distance; Ulisse disembarks with his entourage from one of the ships and is met by Aci.
After a long and arduous journey, Ulisse is happy to have landed. He sees a cave that will serve as suitable accommodation. Aci warns Ulisse of Polifemo the giant cyclops who terrorizes people, killing and devouring them. Aci explains that he knows the giant's routine and has been able to avoid him. He urges Ulisse to leave. But Ulisse wants to see the giant first; he explains his lack of fear in that "The greatest dangers are but common objects." (Core avvezzo al furore dell'armi). Aci muses that Ulisse's bravery is the kind that can vanquish Polifemo. He then sees Galatea, his love, approaching in a ship. (Dolci fresche).

Scene 4: Another part of the shore with cottages belonging to fishermen.
Calipso in disguise meets Ulisse. He is taken with her beauty, while she assures him safety (Vedrai che veglia il cielo).

Scene 5
Polifemo enters and is amused to find Ulisse ready to wage battle. Recognizing his heroism, Polifemo pledges to protect Ulisse and his men, which Ulisse warily accepts but remains on guard (Fa ch'io ti provi ancora).

Scene 6: A grove
In a grove, Galatea is happy to be with Aci but wonders at Aci's lack of concern about Polifemo. Aci responds that he's not afraid of the giant. Galatea promises to visit the grove again in order to meet but must leave because of the approach of Polifemo. Aci responds that her presence gives him joy (Morirei del partir nel momento). He leaves and Galatea wonders what the other sea nymphs will think of her affair with a mortal although she loves him. (Ascoltar no non ti volgio).

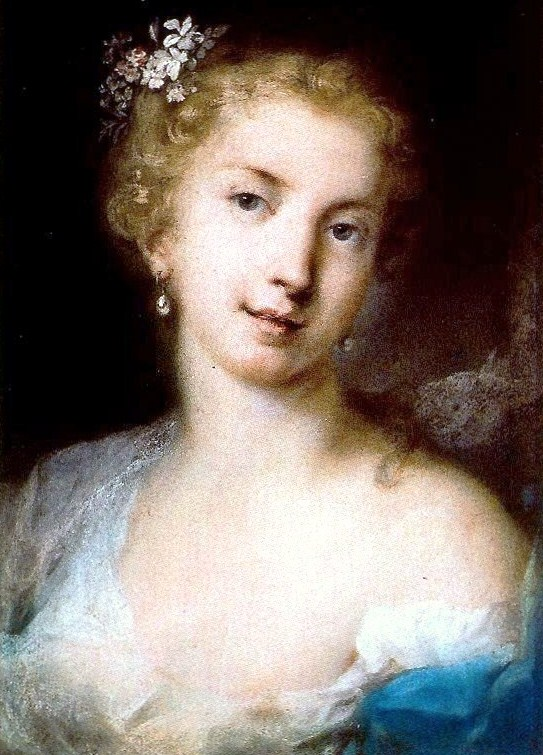
Francesca Cuzzoni (1696–1778) the first Galatea

=== Act 2 ===
Scene 1
Calipso muses on the implications of her love to a mortal.
(In the first version: Nerea encourages Calipso to use her charms in mollifying Polifemo in order to liberate Ulisse from the cave where he and his men are protecting themselves (Una beltà che sa.)

Scene 2
Ulisse approaches with a flock and tells Calipso that Polifemo has given him a shepherd's tasks, and that his men are held captive in a cave. He explains that they are captives until Polifemo's slaves return with presents. If the slaves have brought no presents to Polifemo, then he will devour them. Calipso tells him not to worry because the gods are on his side (Lascia fra tanti malì) (early version:Nel rigor d'avversa stella) Ulisse remarks on her kindness (Fortunate pecorelle!).

Scene 3
Aci revels in his infatuation for Galatea (Lontan dal solo e caro...Lusingato dalla speme) (First version: Zeffiro lusinghier).

Scene 4: A view of the sea
Preparing to meet Polifemo, Galatea sails in her seashell, encouraging the breezes to bring her to Ulisse (Placidetti zeffiretti). Polifemo intercepts her and questions why she would prefer a young boy to his attributes. She refuses him and Polifemo swears revenge on Aci. Galatea continues entreating the breezes to bring her to Aci (Placidetti zeffiretti).

Scene 5: Aci and Galatea
Aci encourages the cupids to bring Galatea safely to shore (Amoretti vezzosetti). Aci and Galatea have an excited exchange in which they reveal their love for one another. Galatea tells Aci to meet her later in a grotto, and Aci promises to do so, his passion for Galatea overcoming his fears (Nell'attendere il mio bene). Galatea is smitten by Aci and wishes that all her hopes are true (Fidati all speranza). (Earlier version: Dal guardo che incatena.)

Scene 6:
Ulisse awakes to find Calipso. Calipso explains who she is to him. She promises him safety if he will give his heart to her, and alerts him that the slaves are bringing presents to Polifemo. Overjoyed, Ulisse sings (Dell'immortal bellezza).

Scene 7: A grove
Aci and Galatea express their love despite foreboding feelings of fear (Tacito movi e tardo).

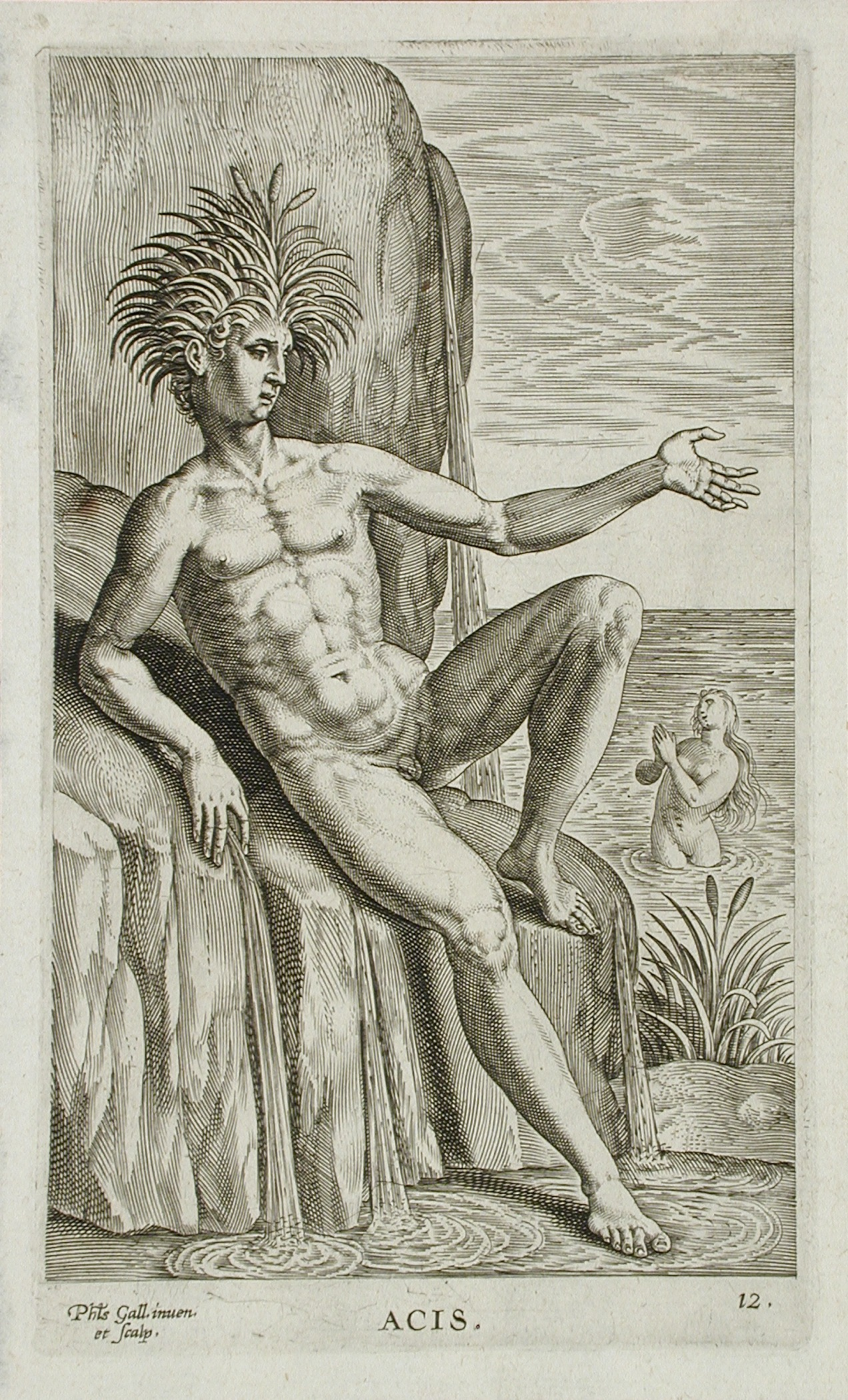
Now transformed into a god, Acis brings forth a river (believed to be the Jaci) (Acis LACMA M.88.91.382m)

=== Act 3 ===
Scene 1: A rock near Mount Etna, at the foot of which in a shady bower where Aci and Galatea are located.
Polifemo admonishes Galatea (Fugace Galatea). He would have gladly been a water nymph to be with her. But he is more powerful than Jove and will bring about vengeance because of her refusal. He throws the rock and kills Aci.

Scene 2
Galatea mourns Aci (Smanie d'Affanno).

Scene 3: Polifemo's cave
Ulisse and Calipso prepare to meet Polifemo. Ulisse wonders why she is helping him. Calipso explains that his previous heroic actions have moved her to help him. She becomes invisible as Polifemo enters, exultant over having exacted revenge. Ulisse offers him some wine from Mount Etna (D'un disprezzato amor). Polifemo drinks and falls asleep. Ulisse takes a burning brand and sticks it in Polifemo's eye and exults in having overcome him (Quel vasto, quel fiero). Calipso rejoices in seeing Ulisse beat Polifemo.

Scene 4: The rock which fell upon Aci
Galatea is happy that Polifemo has been vanquished but implores Jove to restore Aci to life.

Scene 5
The rock opens and a stream springs forth. Aci, now the god of the stream, holds an urn. Both Aci and Galatea thank Jove for restoring his life (Alto Giove).

Scene 6
Now blind, Polifemo wanders the island aimlessly (Furie ce mi strazjate). Aci tells Polifemo that Jove has exacted revenge for killing him (Senti il fato). Polifemo acknowledges that he is consumed with rage.

Scene 7
Ulisse praises the nymphs and all around him (Intessiete ghirlande). All sing a chorus to love (Accendi nuova face).

== Roles ==
Role	Voice type	Premiere cast, 1 February 1735
Polifemo, a giant man-eating cyclops	bass	Antonio Montagnana
Aci, mortal, in love with Galatea	mezzo soprano castrato	Farinelli
Galatea, a nymph, in love with Aci	soprano	Francesca Cuzzoni
Ulisse, on a long journey returning home	alto castrato	Senesino
Calipso	contralto	Francesca Bertolli
Nerea	soprano	Signora Segatti

== Reception ==
Music historian Charles Burney apparently kept a diary and captured the interest that accompanied performances of Polifemo. He also had a copy of Walsh's publication The favourite songs in the opera call'd Polypheme upon which he based his criticism of the music.

"In examining the favourite songs of this opera that were printed by Walsh...there appears to be considerable merit in the melody. Indeed, much of the new taste, and new passages of this period, seems to have been derived from Porpora's songs; that the difference of style and fancy in the airs of Farinelli with those that were sung by Nicolini two or three and twenty year before, is wonderful. ..The King, Queen, Prince of Wales, and Princesses, honoured the first representation of Polifemo with their presence, and there was the fullest house of the season. This opera, with no other interruption, than the benefits continued in run twelve or thirteen nights."

"Of the five airs that were expressly composed for the talents of this great singer, the first [Lusingato dalla speme] was a mezza bravura, accompanied on the hautbois by the celebrated San Martini. Two such performers must have made a worse production interesting; but the composition now appears poor, and the passages light and frivolous. The second air [Senti il fato], which abounds with phrases manquées, has long notes in distant intervals, and brilliant divisions, to display the voice and execution of the performer. The third air Alto Giove which is a cantabile, has elegant passages, and seems well calculated to shew the taste and expression of a superior singer. The fourth air [Dolci fresche] is languid, common, and uninteresting, on paper; how it was embellished and meliorated by the voice and pathetic powers of Farinelli, those can best imagine, who have been delighted with the performance of a great singer, in spite of bad music. The fifth air [Nell'attendere il mio bene] is a bravura with innumerable unmeaning shakes, and divisions that are now become common and insipid."

== Compositional features ==
The libretto of Polifemo has 21 da capo arias, 4 cavatinas and 2 ariettas. It also includes two duets, one trio, and two choruses.

An example of how Rolli pushed the boundaries of form lies in the cavatina Placidetti zeffieretti for Galatea. Instead of a repetition of the first stanza, Rolli has a recitative between Galatea and Polifemo before commencing the second verse. Rolli has Aci also sing a cavatina, Amoretti vezzosetti which is similarly interrupted with an intervening recitative. The similarity of forms and procedure is undoubtedly intended to show the deep coupling between the two characters.

Another example of Rolli's daring is his taking on the liaison des scènes, a dramatic convention that disallowed the stage to be empty at any time. It was thought that having an empty stage would interrupt the action. In his revision of Polifemo, Rolli has Polifemo leave the stage at the end of the penultimate scene, emphasizing the cyclops' desolation prior to the joyous final scene.

Rolli attempted creating a larger structure within the da capo aria tradition. Act 2, scene 4 begins with Galatea's cavatina Placidetti zeffiretti. After recitative between her and Polifemo, her lover Aci responds with the cavatina Amoretti vezzosetti. As the lines of Aci's cavatina closely resemble Galatea's with the same music, Rolli and Porpora make clear this is an expanded and modified da capo aria.

Of all Porpora's London operas, Polifemo has the most accompanied recitatives. Dumigan states that its use was to carefully "delineate the characters, their emotions and the inherent drama" as well as "to intensify moments of action and frenzy." Though the blinding of Polifemo is not explicitly shown, Ulisse narrates what he plans to do in the accompanied recitative. He goes off stage and the narrative is continued by Calipso who describes the blinding and the cyclops's subsequent rage and pain. Porpora used the accompanied recitative also for expression of love, particularly in passages where Galatea expresses longing for Aci and he for her (two in act 1 and one in act 3).

Musicologist Michael F. Robinson states "The saving grace of the work, which might give it the chance of success in a modern production, is the strong characterization of Polyphemus..." He notes that in act 3 the cyclops kills Aci, is blinded by Ulisse, and then suffers through the transformation of Aci into a river god. Additionally, being a bass, Polyphemus provides contrast to the high voices of the women and castrato singers.

== Publications ==
Polifemo's original and revised librettos were published in Italian with English translation by Colley Cibber.

Seven excerpts from the opera were published in full score in The favourite songs in the opera call'd Polypheme (London: John Walsh, 1735). It included the following:

- Lusingato dalla speme
- Senti il fato
- Alto Giove e tua grazia
- Dolci fresche aurette
- Morirei del partir
- Nell'attendere il mio bene
- Potrò di tanto amor

Several years later (approximately 1740), Walsh reprinted the seven arias and added Fortunate pe cor che and D'un disprezzato amor for volume 2 of his compilation Le delizie dell'opere. He then reprinted all nine arias in another edition of The favourite songs...

As of 2026 there is still neither published a complete orchestra score or a vocal score. Some editors have come out with editions of particular arias.

== Revivals ==
Possibly due to the inclusion of the aria Alto Giove in the 1994 film Farinelli there has been renewed interest in Polifemo. Various arias have been recorded by Vivica Genaux, Philippe Jaroussky, Cecilia Bartoli, Franco Fagioli, and Simone Kermes.

Parnassus Arts Productions staged the opera at Theater an der Wien in 2013. A semi-staged production was presented at the Salzburg Festival in 2019.

The Opéra National du Rhin produced the first performance of this opera in France in February 2024 in Strasbourg and Mulhouse. Emmanuelle Haïm directed the music with the orchestra she founded, Le Concert d'Astrée. Franco Fagioli, Paul Antoine Benos Djian and Madison Nonoa interpreted the main roles.

The American premiere of Polifemo, was presented by Opera Neo in San Diego, CA. The production took place at UC San Diego Park and Market on July 19 & 20, 2024, and it was directed by Daria Zholnerova and conducted by Peter Kozma.

In December 2024 the Royal Opera of Versailles staged a version of the opera.

== Sources ==
- Burney, Charles (1957). A General History of Music From the Earliest Ages to the Present Period. Vol. 2. New York: Dover Publications.
- Dumigan, Darryl Jacqueline (2014). Nicola Porpora's Operas for the 'Opera of the Nobility': the Poetry and the Music (PDF) (Ph.D.). University of Huddersfield.
- Porpora, Nicola (1735), The favourite songs in the opera call'd Polypheme, London: John Walsh, OCLC 22913312
- Robinson, Michael F.; Markstrom, Kurt (2001). "Porpora, Nicola". Grove Music Online / Oxford Music Online. Oxford University Press.
- Robinson, Michael F. (1971–72), "Porpora's Operas for London, 1733–1736", Soundings, 2: 58–87
- Rolli, Paolo (1735). Polifemo melodrama di Paolo Rolli, F.R.S. Composto da Nicolò Porpora pe'l Regio Teatro del' Hay-Market. Londra: Carlo Bennet., English Short Title Catalog T43935. (available with subscription through Gale Eighteenth century collections online)
- Rolli, Paolo (1734). Polifemo melodrama di Paolo Rolli, F.R.S. Composto da Nicolò Porpora per la nobiltà Britannica. Londra: Carlo Bennet., English Short Title Catalog, T43936. (available with subscription through Gale Eighteenth century collections online)
- Smith, William C.; Humphries, Charles (1968). A Bibliography of the Musical Works Published by the Firm of John Walsh During the Years 1721–1766. London: The Bibliographical Society.
