= Samuel Humphreys (poet) =

English poet, librettist and translator

Samuel Humphreys (c.1697–1738) was an English poet, librettist and translator. He is known for the words he wrote for Handel's oratorios Esther (1732), Deborah (1733), and Athalia (1733).

== Life ==
Humphreys was an educated man, who wrote as a poet from around 1728 to 1732, a period during which he also worked for George Frideric Handel. He took up work as a translator, too. These employments followed some personal reverses. He died in Canonbury, where he had rooms, on 11 January 1738. He was buried in Islington churchyard.

== Works ==
Humphreys was known as the author of a Life of Matthew Prior, with an edition of 1733 of Prior's poems. He wrote also:

- verses on Canons the stately home, inscribed to the Duke of Chandos, 1728;
- Malpasia, a Poem Sacred to the Memory of … Lady Malpas, 1732;
- Ulysses, an Opera, 1733, libretto for John Christopher Smith; and
- Annotations on the Old and New Testament, 1735.

For Handel, Humphreys provided expansion to the libretto for Esther (1732), and the libretti for Deborah (1733), and Athalia. Besides writing original libretti, he translated the following dramas and operas: Poro, Re dell' Indie, 1731; Rinaldo, 1731; Venceslao, 1731; Catone in Utica, 1732; Ezio, 1732; Sosarme Re di Media, 1732. His Peruvian Tales (1734, republished in 1817), translated from Thomas-Simon Gueullette, and continued by Samuel Kelly, were popular. He also translated the Spectacle de la nature, by Antoine Noël, abbé de la Pluche, London, 1733, and pieces by Crébillon and La Fontaine.
