= Wolak =

Wolak is a surname. Notable people with the surname include:

- Ewa Wolak (born 1960), Polish politician
- Marsha Wolak (born 1958), American poker player and tennis player
- Paweł Wolak (born 1981), Polish boxer
- Robert Wolak (born 1955), Polish mathematician

== See also ==
- Wolak Peak, peak in the Inland Forts northwest of St. Pauls Mountain in the Asgard Range, Victoria Land
