= Ezio (Handel) =

1732 opera seria by George Frideric Handel

George Frideric Handel

Ezio ("Aetius", HWV 29) is an opera seria by George Frideric Handel to a libretto by Metastasio. Metastasio's libretto was partly inspired by Jean Racine's play Britannicus. The same libretto had already been set by many other composers, first of all Nicola Porpora who managed to preempt the official Rome premiere of Pietro Auletta's setting for 26 December 1728 with his own version (of a slightly edited copy of the libretto) for Venice on 20 November, a month earlier. The libretto continued to be set and reset for another 50 years, including two versions of Ezio by Gluck. Handel's Ezio is considered one of the purest examples of opera seria with its absence of vocal ensembles.

The story of the opera is a fictionalisation of events in the life of the fifth-century AD Roman general Flavius Aetius (Ezio in Italian), returned from his victory over Attila.

== Performance history ==
The opera received its first performance at the King's Theatre, London on 15 January 1732. It received a total of only 5 performances before falling from the repertoire, in what turned out to be Handel's greatest operatic failure. It was revived in Göttingen in 1926 and became extremely popular in the former East Germany, receiving more than 350 performances in at least 23 different revivals to 1983. In London, Ezio did not receive another performance after the five in Handel's lifetime until 1977, by the Handel Opera Society at Sadler's Wells Theatre. Winton Dean has stated that the failure of the opera related to the artistic incompatibility between the "classical" nature of the libretto and the more "romantic" nature of the music. As with all Baroque opera seria, Ezio went unperformed for many years, but with the revival of interest in Baroque music and historically informed musical performance since the 1960s, Ezio, like all Handel operas, receives performances at festivals and opera houses today. Among other performances, Ezio was staged by the London Handel Festival in 2005, and in May 2009 it was performed at the Schlosstheater Schwetzingen as part of the Schwetzingen Festival. The performance, staged by Günter Krämer, with Yosemeh Adjei singing Ezio, was also broadcast on the German television network 3sat on 19 September 2009.

== Roles ==
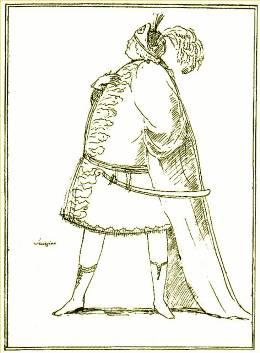
Caricature of Senesino, who created the role of Ezio

Roles, voice types, and premiere cast
Role	Voice type	Premiere cast, 15 January 1732
Ezio, Roman general	alto castrato	Francesco Bernardi, called "Senesino"
Fulvia, his lover	soprano	Anna Maria Strada del Pò
Valentiniano, Roman emperor	contralto	Anna Bagnolesi
Onoria, his sister	contralto	Francesca Bertolli
Massimo, Fulvia's father	tenor	Giovanni Battista Pinacci
Varo, Prefect of the Praetorian Guard	bass	Antonio Montagnana

== Synopsis ==
- Scene: Rome, about 451 AD.

=== Act 1 ===
In the Roman forum, the emperor Valentiniano (Valentinian III) and the people welcome Ezio, who is returning in triumph, having defeated Attila and saved the empire. Ezio greets his sweetheart Fulvia, daughter of Massimo, who although close to the Emperor has never forgiven him for trying to seduce his wife and thirsts for vengeance. Massimo tells Ezio that in the latter's absence the Emperor has fallen in love with Fulvia and now insists on marrying her himself. The only way to prevent this, according to Massimo, is to assassinate the Emperor, but Ezio refuses to have anything to do with such a plot. Alone with his daughter, Massimo tells her that if Ezio will not kill the Emperor, she must first marry and then kill him. Fulvia rejects this idea with horror. Massimo decides that since neither Ezio nor Fulvia will kill Valentiniano, he will send one of his henchmen to do it.

In the palace, Valentiniano's sister Onoria interrogates Varo, captain of the Guards, about Ezio. It becomes clear that she also is in love with the victorious hero.

Valentiniano is growing somewhat jealous of Ezio's fame and glory, but offers Ezio the honour of his sister's hand in marriage. Ezio replies that he cannot marry Onoria as he is in love with Fulvia. Valentiniano announces that he is in love with Fulvia himself, but Ezio doesn't care. The Emperor says he will marry Fulvia the next day, to Ezio's fury.

=== Act 2 ===
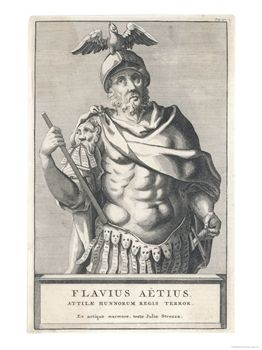
Flavius Aetius, called "Ezio" in the opera

Outside the palace that night, Massimo waits to hear whether his henchman Emilio has succeeded in killing the Emperor. Fulvia enters with the news that someone tried to kill Valentiniano, but was unsuccessful. Emilio has been arrested, but Valentiniano believes him to have been acting on Ezio's orders, in which belief he is encouraged by Massimo.

Fulvia knows her father is lying about Ezio plotting to kill the Emperor but cannot bring herself to denounce her father as a traitor. She tries to convince Ezio to flee, but he refuses such a cowardly course. Ezio is arrested.

Fulvia thinks perhaps the best thing will be for her to pretend to accept the Emperor in marriage, and that way she will be able to rescue Ezio. The Emperor has Ezio brought to him with Fulvia by his side as his betrothed. At first Fulvia tells Ezio that yes, she has agreed to marry the Emperor but finally has to admit it is a pretense, she still loves Ezio. Valentiniano has Ezio thrown into prison.

=== Act 3 ===
Onoria visits Ezio in the prison with an offer from the Emperor. If Ezio did not plot to kill Valentiniano, let him say who did and he will be released. Ezio refuses to betray others in this way, but Onoria begs him for her sake, as she loves him, to save his own life.

Onoria repeats this conversation to Valentiniano and advises the Emperor to have Fulvia advise Ezio to reveal what he knows about the plot to kill Valentiniano. However Ezio remains silent even so and is taken away.

Varo announces that Ezio has been executed on the Emperor's orders (but this is not really the case). Onoria brings the news that Massimo's henchman Emilio with his dying breath insisted that he was not acting on Ezio's orders. In order to save her father from suspicion Fulvia announces that she is the one who was behind the assassination plot. Valentiniano is bitter - everyone around him seems to be his enemy with no one he can trust.

Massimo, at the Capitol, is trying to instigate a popular revolt against the Emperor, who appears, alone and in despair at Fulvia's supposed betrayal. Massimo attempts to kill the Emperor, but Fulvia suddenly rushes in and throws herself between her father and Valentiniano, saving his life. Varo enters with Ezio, to general astonishment. Valentiniano can see now that Fulvia and Ezio really love each other and that he was wrong to try to part them. They will marry, and Valentiniano agrees to Ezio's entreaty for him to pardon the repentant Massimo. All celebrate the fortunate outcome of events.

== Context and analysis ==
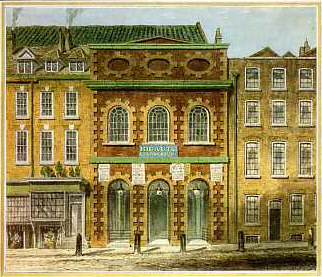
The King's Theatre, London, where Ezio had its first performance

The German-born Handel, after spending some of his early career composing operas and other pieces in Italy, settled in London, where in 1711 he had brought Italian opera for the first time with his opera Rinaldo. A tremendous success, Rinaldo created a craze in London for Italian opera seria, a form focused overwhelmingly on solo arias for the star virtuoso singers. In 1719, Handel was appointed music director of an organisation called the Royal Academy of Music (unconnected with the present day London conservatoire), a company under royal charter to produce Italian operas in London. Handel was not only to compose operas for the company but hire the star singers, supervise the orchestra and musicians, and adapt operas from Italy for London performance.

The Royal Academy of Music collapsed at the end of the 1728 - 29 season, partly due to the huge fees paid to the star singers. A bitter rivalry had developed between the supporters of the two prima donnas who had appeared in Handel's last few operas, Francesca Cuzzoni and Faustina Bordoni, culminating in June 1727 with a brawl in the audience while the two prima donnas onstage stopped singing, traded insults and pulled each other's hair, to enormous public scandal satirized in the popular The Beggar's Opera of 1728 and bringing Italian opera of the kind Handel composed into a certain amount of ridicule and disrepute. At the end of the 1729 season, both ladies left London for engagements in continental Europe. Handel went into partnership with John James Heidegger, the theatrical impresario who held the lease on the King's Theatre in the Haymarket where the operas were presented and started a new opera company with a new prima donna, Anna Strada.

For the opera season of 1732, opening with Ezio, Handel added to his ensemble of singers the tenor Giovanni Battista Pinacci, his wife alto Anna Bagnolesi, and the renowned bass Antonio Montagnana, the latter beginning a long association with Handel and creating many roles in Handel's works.

Ezio is the last of three operas Handel composed to texts by the most famous librettist of the day, Metastasio, the other two being Siroe and Poro. Many of the long passages of recitative in the Metastasio original were cut in Handel's version, London audiences preferring to move more swiftly from one aria to the next. Unlike most of Handel's operas, there are no duets or other ensembles in the piece at all, only recitatives and arias. Ezio was performed just five times in Handel's lifetime, one contemporary noting of it that it was "a New Opera, Clothes & all ye Scenes New - but did not draw much Company" (at that time scenery and costumes were often drawn from stock, entirely new costumes and scenes were an added attraction.) Nevertheless, King George II attended every performance but one.

To music historian David Vickers, Ezio is "one of Handel's finest serious operas."

The opera is scored for two recorders, two flutes, two oboes, two bassoons, trumpet, two horns, strings and continuo (cello, lute, harpsichord).

== Recordings ==
Ezio discography
Year	Cast: Ezio, Fulvia Valentiniano, Onoria Massimo, Varo	Conductor, orchestra	Label
1995	D'Anna Fortunato, Julianne Baird, Raymond Pellerin, Jennifer Lane, Frederick Urrey, Nathaniel Watson	Richard Auldon Clark; Manhattan Chamber Orchestra	VOX; Cat:2 7503
2008	Ann Hallenberg, Karina Gauvin, Sonia Prina, Marianne Andersen, Ancio Zorzi, Vito Priante	Alan Curtis; Il Complesso Barocco	DG Archiv; Cat:477 8073
