= La festa d'Imeneo =

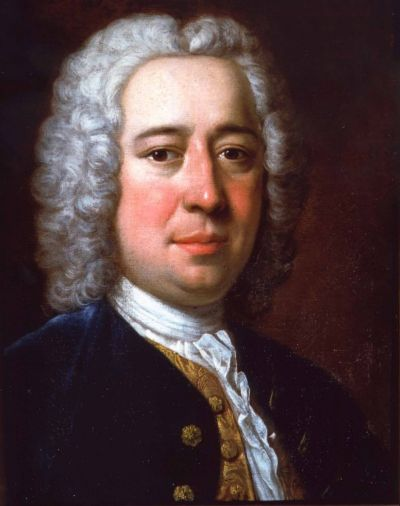
Nicola Antonio Porpora

La festa d'Imeneo (The Festival of Hymenaeus) is a serenata by Nicola Porpora, with a libretto by Paolo Rolli. It was premiered at the King's Theatre on 4 May 1736 by the Opera of the Nobility to mark the marriage of Porpora's patron Frederick, Prince of Wales to Augusta of Saxe-Gotha on 27 April that year. The lead role was sung by Senesino, but it proved unsuccessful in the face of Handel's Atalanta, premiered later that month to mark the marriage. Imeneo's opening aria, "Vaghi amori", has been recorded occasionally.

An aria recorded by Cecilia Bartoli was played on NPR news on December 26, 2019.
