= Esther (Handel) =

Oratorio by George Frideric Händel

George Frideric Handel

Esther (HWV 50) is an oratorio by George Frideric Handel. It is generally acknowledged to be the first English oratorio. Handel set a libretto after the Old Testament drama by Jean Racine. The work was originally composed in 1718, but was heavily revised into a full oratorio in 1732.

== Masque (1718, revised 1720) ==
Esther began in 1718 as a masque, or chamber drama (HWV 50a), composed early in Handel's English career, and before the body of his success as an opera composer. It was first composed and performed at Cannons, where the Duke of Chandos employed Handel from 1716 - 1718 as resident composer writing for his patron's singers and small orchestra. Little is known about this first version of Esther. The version which survives is of a revision in 1720, also probably intended for private performance at Cannons, where the very wealthy Duke of Chandos employed a group of musicians and singers, and where Acis and Galatea, Handel's first non-religious vocal work in the English language, also had its premiere in 1718. The Cannons version of Esther was in six scenes with no break and written for an ensemble of one soprano, an alto, two tenors and two basses. Like Acis and Galatea, Esther may have been staged or semi-staged, with the soloists singing together to create a chorus when required. The author of the libretto is uncertain, probably a collaborative work between John Arbuthnot and Alexander Pope.

=== Dramatis Personae ===
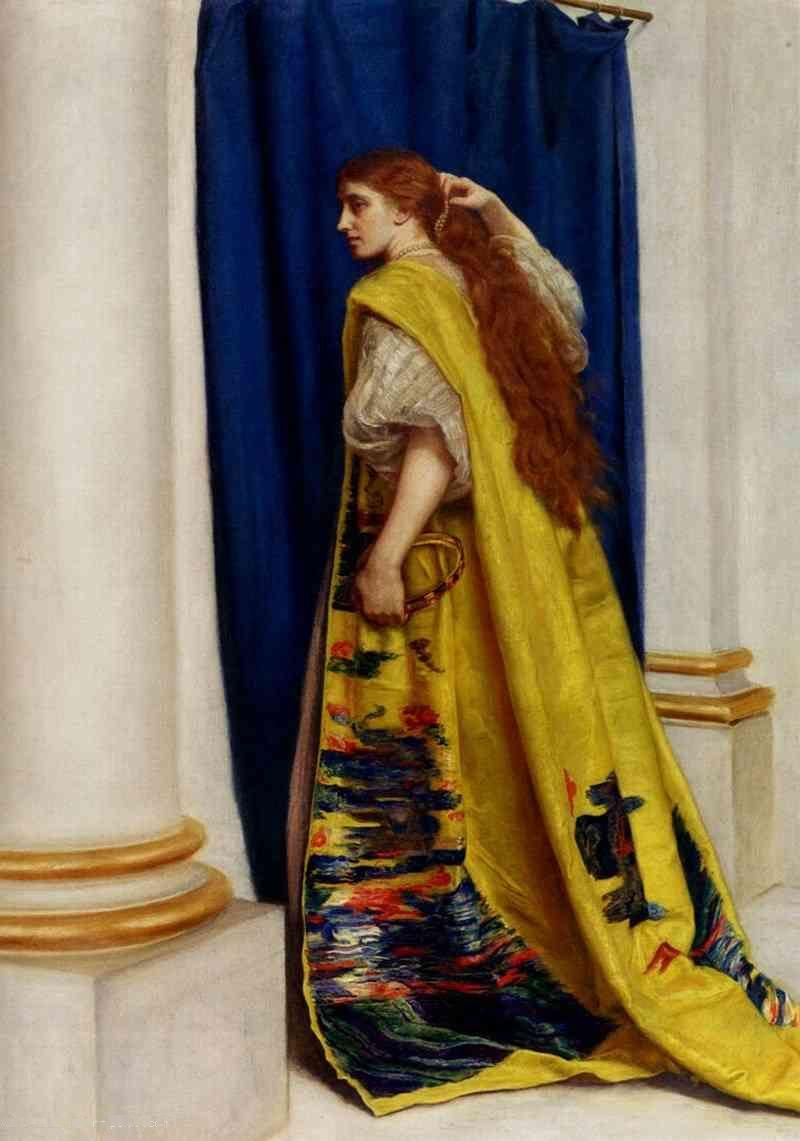
Esther by John Everett Millais

- Esther (soprano)
- Ahasuerus, King of Persia (tenor)
- Mordecai (tenor)
- Haman (bass)
- Israelite Woman (soprano)
- Priest (alto)
- First Israelite (tenor)
- Second Israelite (bass)
- Habdonah (bass)
- Persian Officer (bass)
- Chorus of Israelites
- Chorus of Persian Soldiers

=== Synopsis ===
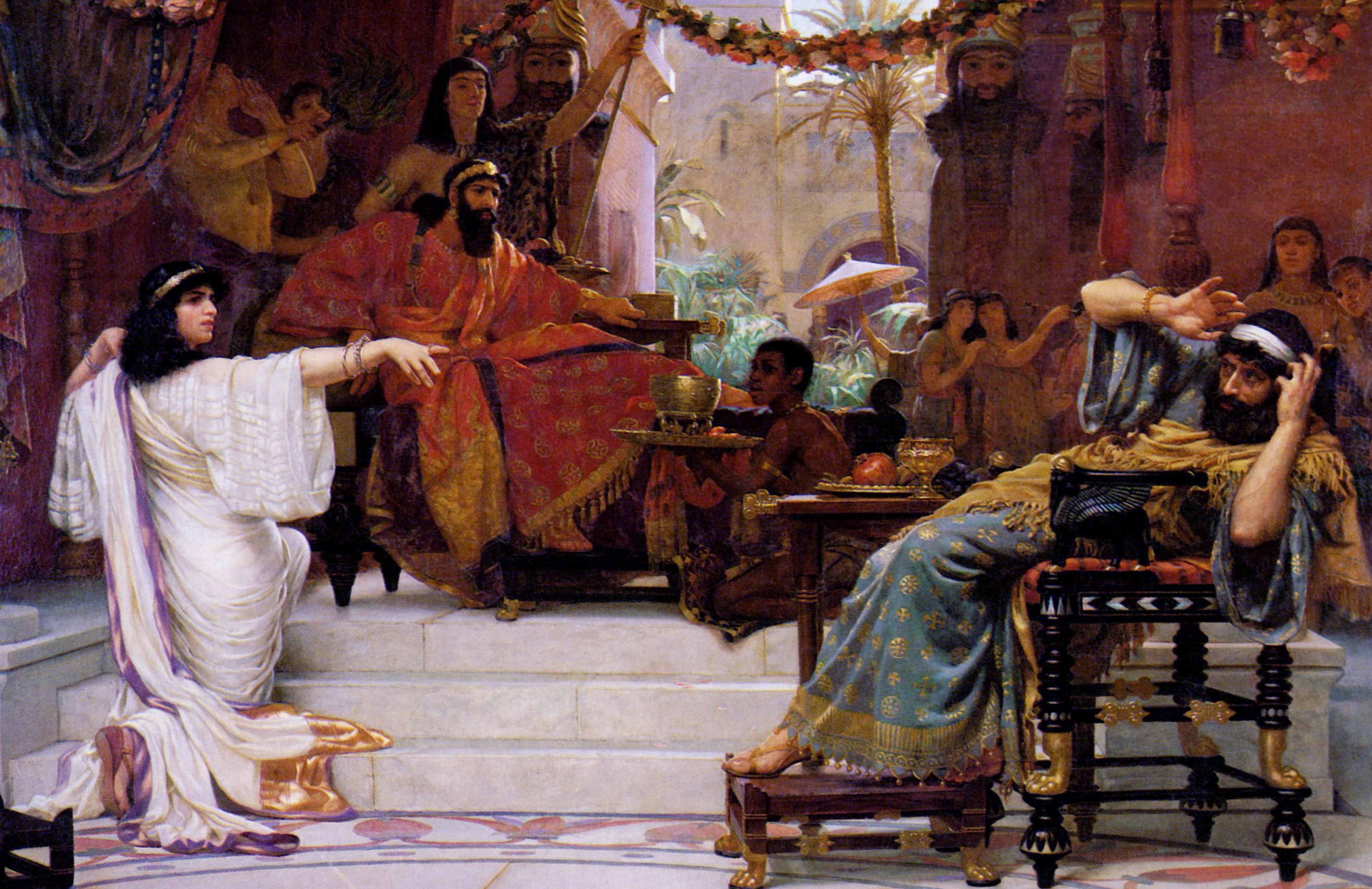
Esther Denouncing Haman by Ernest Normand

Esther, a Jewish orphan, lived with her relative Mordecai, an advisor to King Ahaseurus of Persia. Mordecai had discovered and prevented a conspiracy to assassinate the King. Ahaseurus, having rejected his previous wife, selected Esther as his spouse. The Prime Minister, Haman, became enraged when Mordecai refused to bow to him, Mordecai stating that he would bow only to his God. The first version of "Esther" opens as Haman decides to order the extermination of all Jews throughout the Persian empire as retaliation for Mordecai's insult to him. The Jews, meanwhile, are celebrating Esther's accession as Queen of Persia but their happiness turns to mourning when they hear the news that the slaughter of all Jews has been ordered. Esther asks Mordecai why he is displaying grief by being dressed in sackcloth and ashes and he tells her the King has followed his Prime Minister's advice to order the extermination of the Jews. He asks Esther to appeal to her husband to rescind the order, but she explains that it is forbidden upon pain of death to approach the King without being sent for. She decides to take this risk anyway and goes to see the King, who pardons her breach of protocol in approaching him without invitation and offers to grant any petition she asks. Esther only requests that the King and Haman will attend a banquet hosted by herself. At the dinner, Esther reminds the King that Mordecai had saved his life and reveals her Jewish origin. She tells the King that the order to exterminate the Jews is directed against Mordecai and herself. Haman had prepared a gallows on which to hang Mordecai, but the King orders Haman himself to be executed there. The Jews give thanks to God for their deliverance.

=== Musical features ===
Notable among the arias is "Tune Your Harps to Cheerful Strains," with pizzicato string accompaniment; an actual harp is used in the orchestra in the following aria. The work ends with a lengthy and grandiose choral movement.

== Oratorio (1732) ==
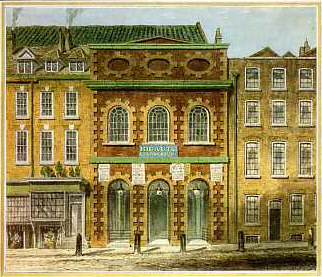
London King's Theatre Haymarket, where the 1732 version of "Esther" was first performed

By 1731, Handel had spent more than ten years composing Italian operas for London and presenting seasons of his operas at London theatres. There was no system of royalties or copyright at that time, and a copy of the score of Esther having been obtained, the 1720 version was performed, apparently in a staged version, by boy singers of the Chapel Royal at the Crown and Anchor tavern, a popular venue for music, and was very successful. A member of the Royal Family asked Handel to present Esther at the theatre where his operas were performed, but the Bishop of London, Edmund Gibson, would not permit Biblical stories to be acted out upon the stage. Therefore, Handel decided to present Esther in concert form as an addition to the 1732 opera season, with the singers currently appearing in the Italian operas but no scenery or stage action, and in a revised three-act form with additional text by Samuel Humphreys. The work was extremely popular and thus the form of the English oratorio was invented, almost by accident.

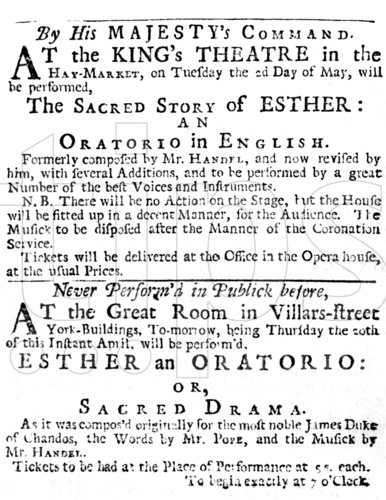
Original playbill for Handel's oratorio "Esther" 1732

The coronation anthems Handel had written for the coronation of George II in 1727, with their large orchestra and massed choruses, had made a huge impact, and the playbills advertising the 1732 performances of Esther said "The music will be disposed after the manner of the Coronation Service". Handel's Italian operas laid overwhelming emphasis on solo arias for the star singers, with no extra choruses, while for the revision of Esther, the coronation anthems "My Heart is Inditing" and a version of "Zadok the Priest" were added. Their large choruses and grandiose orchestral effects with trumpets and drums were very different from what London audiences had experienced in Handel's Italian operas. Esther was very successful, Handel revived the work in many subsequent London seasons, and it proved the prototype for a long succession of similar dramatic oratorios in English by the composer.

The playbills also stated "N.B. There will be no action on the stage, but the house will be fitted up in a decent manner for the audience." An anonymous pamphleteer found this novel form of entertainment, with the Italian opera stars sitting on stage in contemporary dress and singing in mangled English, rather hard to get used to:

This being a new thing set the whole world a-madding. Han't you been at the oratorio? says one. Oh! if you don't see the oratorio you see nothing, says t'other, so away I go to the oratorio, where indeed I saw the finest assembly of people I ever beheld in my life; but to my great surprise found this sacred drama a mere concert, no scenery, dress or action, so necessary to a drama. But Handel was placed in a pulpit ... by him sat Senesino, Strada, Bertolli and Turner Robinson [stars of the Italian opera] in their own habits [clothes] ... Strada gave us a "Hallelujah" of an half hour long; Senesino and Bertolli made rare work of the English tongue, you would have sworn it had been Welsh. I would have wished it had been Italian, that they might have sung with more ease to themselves, since ... it might as well have been Hebrew.

James Murray recounts as an anecdote of the 1732 premiere performance that the foreign singers garbled the text, Senesino making the line "I come my queen to chaste delights" to be heard as "I comb my queen to chase the lice" according to a contemporary account.

=== Dramatis personae ===
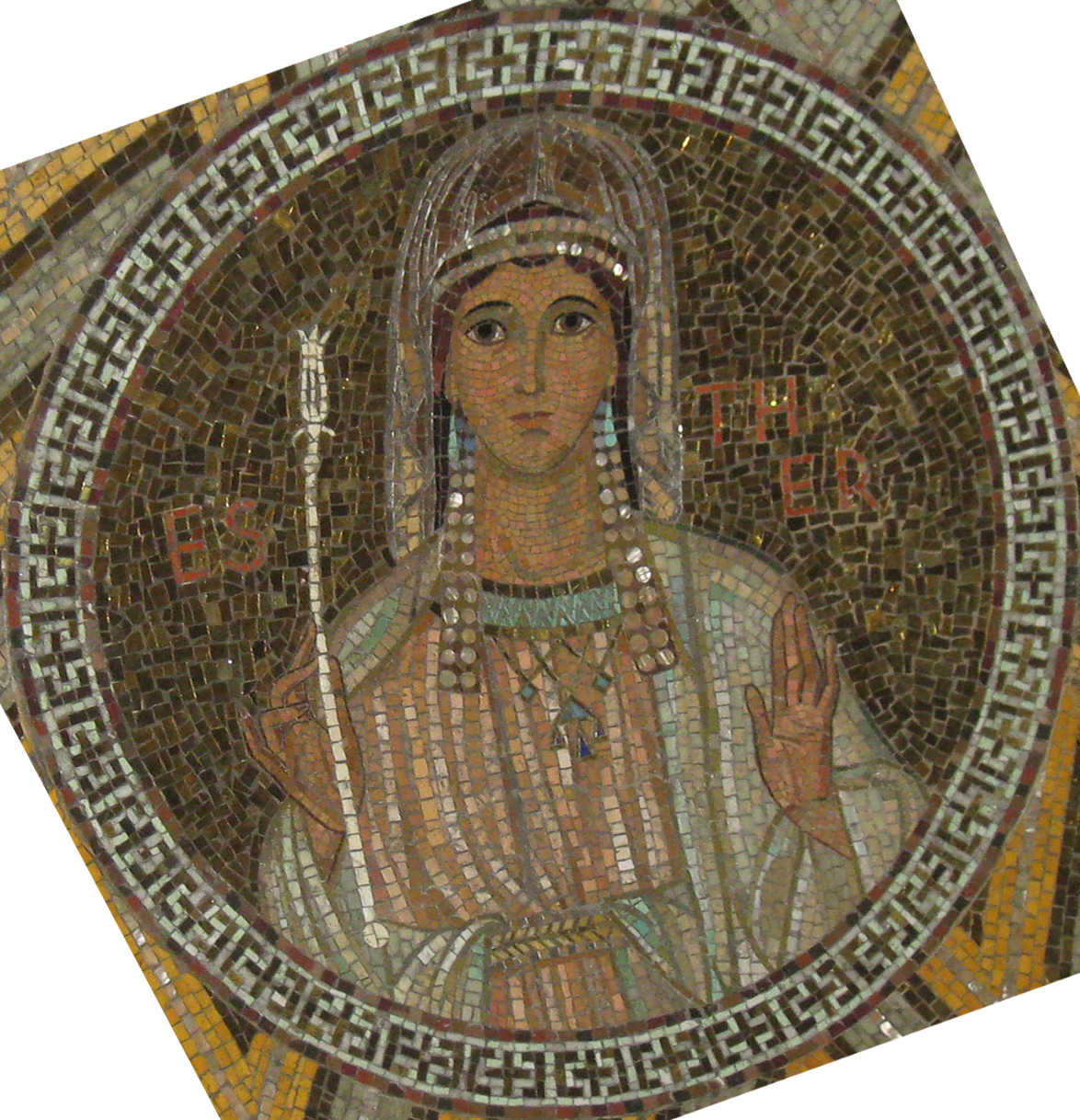
Esther, mosaic from The Dormition Church on Mount Zion in Jerusalem

Roles, voice types, and premiere cast
| Role | Voice | 1732 cast |
|---|---|---|
| Esther | soprano | Anna Maria Strada |
| Ahasuerus, King of Persia | alto-castrato | Senesino |
| Mordecai | contralto | Francesca Bertolli |
| Haman | bass | Antonio Montagnana |
| Harbonah | contralto | Francesca Bertolli |
| Israelite Woman | soprano | Ann Turner Robinson |
| First Israelite | soprano | Mrs. Davies |

=== Synopsis ===
==== Act 1 ====
Esther and her adoptive father Mordecai are thrilled by Esther's elevation to Queen of Persia. Meanwhile, the Prime Minister Haman, insulted by Mordecai's refusal to make obeisance to him on religious grounds, persuades King Ahasuerus to order the extermination of all Mordecai's fellow Jews throughout the Empire (which at that time included Jerusalem and Judea). Esther and the Jewish people are giving thanks to God for Esther becoming Queen when Mordecai brings the news that the royal order has been given for the Jews' extermination and their happiness turns to mourning.

==== Act 2 ====
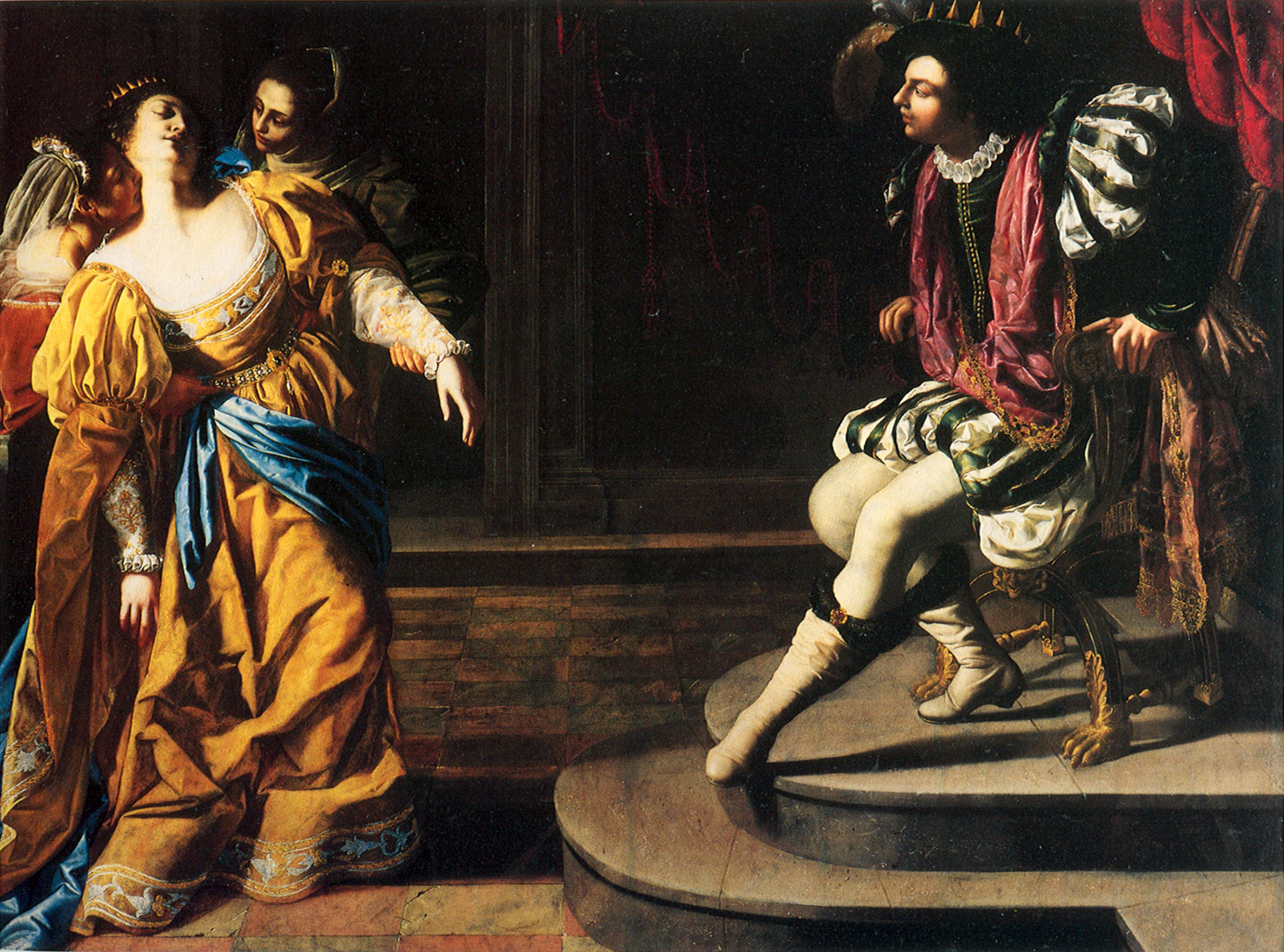
Esther before Ahasuerus by Artemisia Gentileschi

Mordecai asks Esther to appeal to her husband the King to rescind his order for the extermination of the Jews, but Esther explains that she, like everyone else, is forbidden, upon pain of death, to approach the King without his express invitation. However, on Mordecai's pleading, she decides to risk the King's wrath. The Jewish people pray that her mission of mercy will succeed. When Esther confronts the King, he is at first displeased and she faints away. The chorus comment that her charms are sure to melt the King's heart in the end.

==== Act 3 ====
Mordecai and the Jewish people are confident that God will come to their aid and that Esther's plea to the King will be successful. In the King's apartments, Ahaseurus now declares he will give Esther anything she asks. Esther reveals her Jewish origins and points out that Haman devised the order for the Jews' extermination in order to target herself and Mordecai, who had previously saved the King's life. The King is horror struck and orders Haman's execution. Haman appeals to Esther for pardon, but she scorns him. The Jews offer magnificent songs of praise to God for their salvation.

=== Musical features ===
Notable among the pieces added for 1732 is the opening arioso for Esther, "Breathe soft ye gales", scored for strings and two each of bassoons, recorders and oboes. The woodwinds and strings are at first divided into numerous different parts, as they play against a background of a contrasting group of continuo instruments consisting of organ, harpsichord, theorbo and harp. The instruments then join together to create a lush texture.

== Recordings ==
=== 1718 version as revised in 1720 ===
- Patrizia Kwella (Esther), Anthony Rolfe Johnson (Ahasuerus), Ian Partridge (Mordecai), David Thomas (Haman), Emma Kirkby (Israelite Woman), Drew Minter (Priest). Conductor Christopher Hogwood, The Academy of Ancient Music Orchestra and Chorus. L'Oiseau-Lyre 4144232, released 1985.
- Lynda Russell (Esther), Tom Randle (Ahasuerus), Mark Padmore (Mordecai), Michael George (Haman), Nancy Argenta (Israelite Woman), Michael Chance (Priest). Conductor Harry Christophers, The Symphony of Harmony and Invention and The Sixteen. Coro COR16019, released 1996.

=== First reconstructable version (Cannons), 1720 ===
Susan Hamilton (Esther), James Gilchrist (Ahasuerus), Nicholas Mulroy (Mordecai), Matthew Brook (Haman), Electra Lochhead (Israelite), Robin Blaze (Priest). Conductor John Butt, Dunedin Consort Orchestra and Chorus. Linn Records CKD 397, released 2012.

=== 1732 version including two Coronation Anthems ===
Rosemary Joshua (Esther), James Bowman (Ahasuerus), Susan Bickley (Mordecai), Christopher Purves (Haman), Rebecca Outram (Israelite Woman). Conductor Laurence Cummings London Handel Orchestra and Chorus. Somm SOMM238/9, released 2007.
