= Arianna in Nasso (Porpora) =

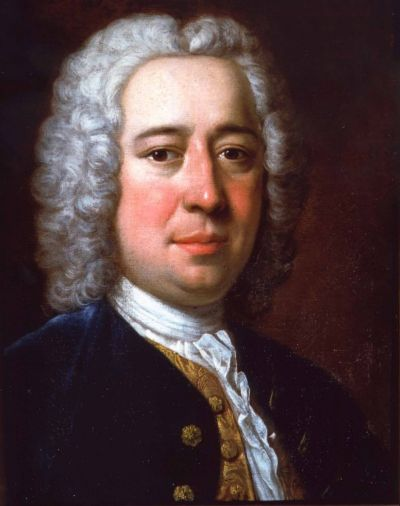
Nicola Antonio Porpora

Arianna in Nasso is a 1733 opera by Nicola Porpora to a libretto by Paolo Rolli, chief conductor of the Opera of the Nobility.

== Background ==
The choice of the subject of Ariadne was a challenge to Handel, whose Arianna in Creta was completed by 5 October 1733. Handel's Arianna in Creta was based on Pietro Pariati's much-set Arianna e Teseo, in the later of two versions by Leonardo Leo (1729). This was a libretto which Porpora himself had also used for his own Arianna e Teseo (1721). Handel's choice of libretto obliged Porpora to turn to Rolli's libretto which was modeled not on Pariati but on Stampa's libretto to Giovanni Porta's dramma pastorale, Arianna.

== Musical numbers ==
Act 1
Overture
Allegro
Scene 1: Ahi! Che langue oppresso il core (Arianna)
Scene 1: L'un minaccia, l'altra alletta (Arianna)
Scene 1: Ahi! Che langue (Arianna)
Scene 2: Cadete a colpi d'Ateniese braccio (Teseo)
Scene 2: Aria: Ho vinto, ma non gia (Teseo)
Scene 3: Figlio d'Ixion, Re dei Lapiti (Piritoo)
Scene 3: Aria: Piu l'impresa perigli n'appresta (Piritoo)
Scene 4: Ecco la piu opportuna aita (Onaro)
Scene 4: Aria: Orgogliose procellose (Onaro)
Scene 5: So che il tuo sol valor (Piritoo)
Scene 5: Aria: Pensat'a vendicar (Antiope)
Scene 6: Grazie a te dello scampo (Teseo)
Scene 6: Aria: Nume che reggi il mare (Teseo)
Scene 7: Il tuo dolce mormorio (Arianna)
Scene 7: Recitative: Lieto ritorno all'alma mia (Teseo)
Scene 7: Aria: D'aura gioconda (Onaro)
Scene 7: Recitative dopa l'aria: Di dolcissimi affetti (Teseo)
Scene 7: Duet: In amoroso petto (Arianna, Teseo)
Act 2
Scene 1: Cotesto e il padiglion (Antiope)
Scene 1: Aria: Gia lo so (Antiope)
Scene 2: Misera! Che ascoltai (Arianna)
Scene 2: Aria: Va', mancator di fe (Arianna)
Scene 3: Egli e desso (Piritoo)
Scene 3: Aria: Giurasti fede (Antiope)
Scene 3: Aria: A contesa di due belle (Piritoo)
Scene 4: Ragione e onor vogliono (Arianna)
Scene 4: Aria: Un altro oggetto puo (Teseo)
Scene 4: Recitative: Agitata alma mia (Arianna)
Scene 4: Aria: Miseri sventurati (Arianna)
Scene 6: Onaro qui venir m'impose (Teseo)
Scene 6: Recitative: Teseo, gia tutte a scolorir le cose (Nume Libero)
Scene 6: Aria: Numi, vi cedo (Teseo)
Act 3
Scene 1: Gran nume Semeleo (Arianna)
Scene 1: Aria: Rendera l'amore all'alma (Onaro)
Scene 2: Si, me ne andro ramingo (Teseo)
Scene 2: Aria: Vivere senza te (Antiope)
Scene 3: Vien fido amico (Teseo)
Scene 3: Aria: Altro da te non bramo (Teseo)
Scene 3: Aria: Fra nuove imprese (Piritoo)
Scene 4: Io son la sola (Arianna)
Scene 4: Duet: Vieni, parti (Antiope, Teseo)
Scene 5: Si, caro ti consola (Arianna)
Scene 5: Aria: Celeste forza (Arianna)
Scene 5: Evoe, Evoe (Coribanti, Baccanti)
