= Antonio Montagnana =

Italian opera singer

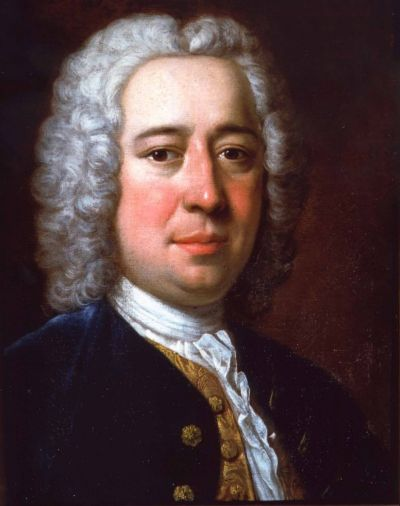
Nicola Porpora, Montagnana's teacher.

Antonio Montagnana (fl. 1730–50, born in Venice) was an Italian bass of the 18th-century who is best remembered for his association with the composer George Frideric Handel, in whose operas Montagnana sang.

Montagnana's first known appearance is in 1730 at Rome, and 1731 he sang at Turin in operatic works by Nicola Porpora, thought to be his teacher: Porpora also instructed the famous castrato Farinelli. During that same year he came to London to join Handel's opera company, where he created roles in Handel's Ezio - with words by the renowned librettist Metastasio - and Sosarme, and sang in revivals of Admeto, Giulio Cesare, Flavio, and Poro. For a revival of Tamerlano on 13 November 1731 when Montagnana sang Leone, Handel wrote for him an additional aria: "Nel mondo e nell'abisso". (This used the same words as an aria he had set in Riccardo Primo, Re d'Inghilterra, but to completely new music.) This was the first music he composed for Montagnana. During the following season he created the role of Zoroastro in Handel's Orlando and sang the roles of Polyphemus in Acis and Galatea and Haman in Esther in what was Handel's first season of oratorio: he also took part in revivals of Tolomeo and Alessandro. The part of Abner in Handel's Athalia was composed for his voice, as were the roles of the Chief Priest of Israel and Abinoam in Deborah. In 1733, however, he deserted Handel for his rival company, the Opera of the Nobility, possibly breaking a legal contract in order to do so. In this he imitated the actions of his fellow singers Senesino and Francesca Bertolli.

For the Nobility, he sang in operas including those by Porpora (such as Polifemo), Johann Adolf Hasse, Giovanni Bononcini, and even one Handel opera, Ottone. In 1740 he moved to Madrid for 10 years, where he sang in many operas and many cantatas at the royal chapel.

For much of the 1730s Montagnana was widely acclaimed as a remarkable singer. The parts written for him at this time display a command of a low tessitura and a vocal range of more than 2 octaves, though by 1738 - when he sang in Handel's Serse - his range had become more limited. 18th-century music historian Charles Burney praised his "depth, power, mellowness and peculiar accuracy of intonation in hitting distant intervals".
