= Astarto (Bononcini) =

Title page of the full libretto (1721)

Astarto is an opera in three acts by Giovanni Bononcini to a libretto by Paolo Rolli, after Apostolo Zeno and Pietro Pariati. It was premiered in January 1715 in Rome at the Teatro Capranica, then revised for the King's Theatre, Haymarket, in London on 19 November 1720 with contralto castrato Senesino.
