= Madison Nonoa =

New Zealand opera singer

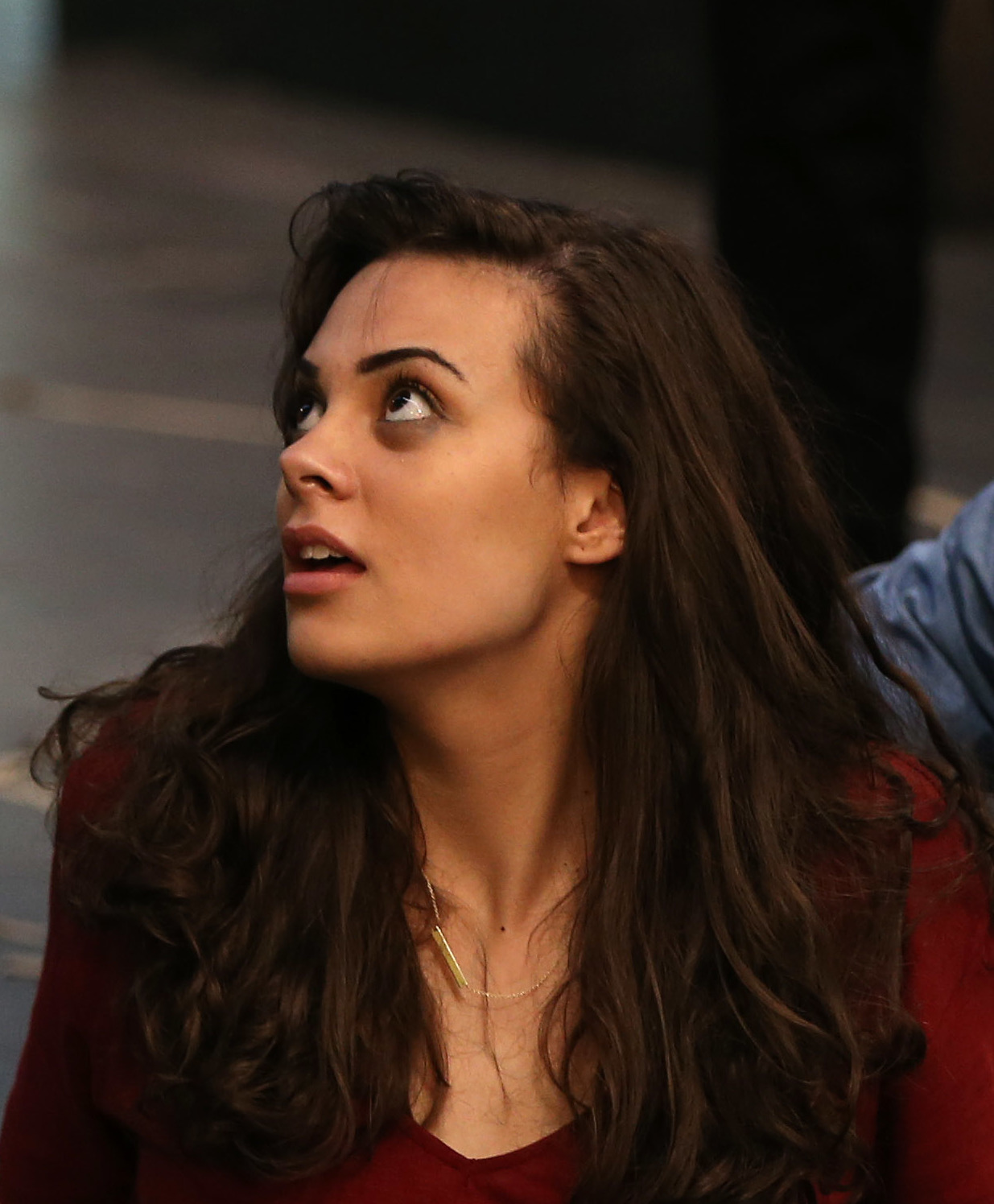
- Born: 1994 (age 31–32); Waikato, New Zealand
- Writing career
- Notable awards: Lexus Song Quest

Madison Nonoa (born 1994) is a New Zealand-born soprano opera singer of Samoan, Niuean, and Pākehā heritage.

== Life ==
Nonoa was born in the Waikato, and attended the University of Auckland, where she graduated in 2014 with a Bachelor of Music Honours (First Class).

== Career ==
In 2016 Nonoa won third place in the 2016 Lexus Song Quest and was awarded the $15,000 Kiri Te Kanawa scholarship for most promising singer.

She was selected as an Emerging Artist with New Zealand Opera and made her professional debut in the role of Papagena in the 2016 production of The Magic Flute. The same year she created the role of Joyce in the world premiere of the Ross Harris chamber opera Brass Poppies at the New Zealand Festival.

In 2017 Nonoa moved to England and studied opera at the Guildhall School of Music and Drama in London under Yvonne Kenny. She performed Susanna in Mozart's Marriage of Figaro with Bloomsbury Opera.

She was supported by the Jerwood Young Artists as a member of the Glyndebourne Festival Opera chorus. In 2020 she was appearing in concert at Glynebourne with Emma Kerr and two other chorus members.

Recent engagements include Papagena Die Zauberflote at Glyndebourne, a participation at Snape Maltings with Simon Keenlyside and Malcolm Martineau as part of the Momentum Scheme, Despina Cosi fan tutte and Tytania A Midsummer Night’s Dream at the Guildhall School of Music and Drama. The 21-22 season includes the role of Maria Westside Story for Opera du Rhin as well as a performance of Couperin’s Trois Leçons de Ténèbres for the King’s Consort.

In 2024 Nonoa portrayed Galatea in the first staging in France of Nicola Porpora's Polifemo with the Opera National du Rhin. She acknowledges the ongoing support of the Dame Kiri Te Kanawa and Dame Malvina Major Foundations.
