= Paolo Rolli =

Italian librettist, poet and translator (1687–1765)

Paolo Rolli FRS
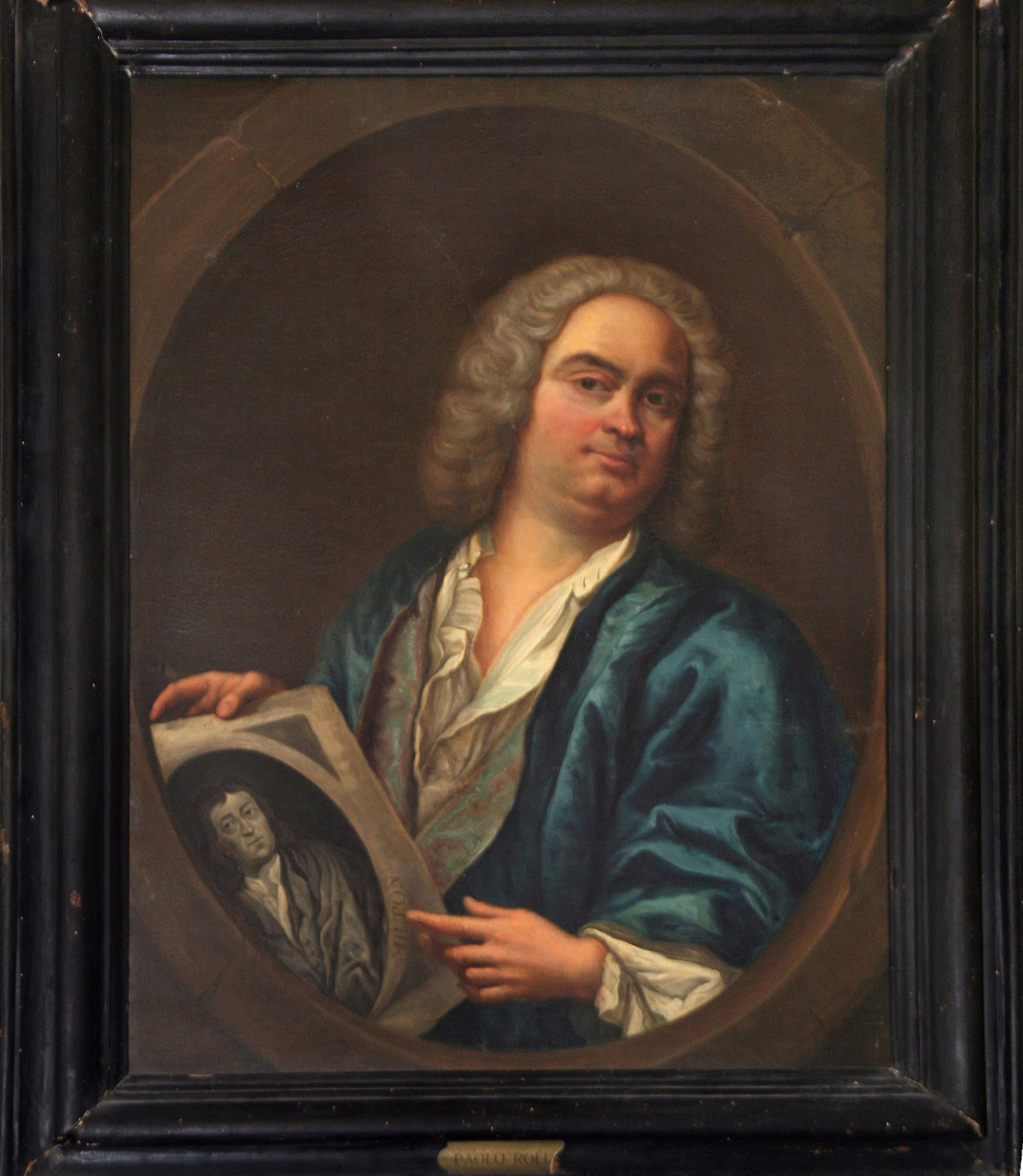
- Born: 13 June 1687; Rome, Papal States
- Died: 20 March 1765 (aged 77); Todi, Papal States
- Resting place: San Fortunato, Todi
- Education: Roman College
- Occupations: Poet; intellectual; librettist
- Writing career
- Language: Italian; English
- Period: 18th century; Age of Enlightenment
- Genres: Lyric poetry; libretto; treatise
- Movement: Neoclassicism

Paolo Antonio Rolli FRS (13 June 1687 – 20 March 1765) was an Italian Rococo librettist, poet and translator. Generally ranked second to Pietro Metastasio among early eighteenth-century Italian poets, Rolli was a member of several Italian academies and a fellow of the Royal Society (1729).

== Biography ==
=== Early years and education ===
Paolo Rolli was born in Rome, Italy, on 13 June 1687, to Philippe Roleau, an architect from Burgundy, and Marta Arnaldi. His early education was from the church, and later at the Roman College, and occasional references to 'l'abate Rolli' suggest he may have taken minor orders. His studies were completed under the jurist and dramatist Giovanni Vincenzo Gravina, one of the founders of the reformist Academy of Arcadia, from whom Rolli (and his fellow student Metastasio) absorbed the ideals of neoclassicism. Gravina and his pupils were active members of the Arcadian Academy until they came into conflict with its head, Giovanni Mario Crescimbeni, after which they founded the Quirinian Academy.

His first publication, Componimenti poetici (1711), is an edition of Arcadian poetry. Rolli produced his first dramatic work, the serenata Sacrificio a Venere, set by Giovanni Bononcini, at Rome in 1714. In 1715 he adapted Apostolo Zeno's Astarto, also set by Bononcini, for the Teatro Capranica.

=== In London ===
In 1715 Rolli was invited to England by Richard Boyle, Earl of Burlington. Through his various literary activities he worked to foster English appreciation of the language and classic literature of Italy. He taught Italian and Italian literature to several English noble families. In 1727 Caroline of Ansbach appointed him Italian tutor of her children Frederick, Amelia and Caroline. The many peers to whom he dedicated his works and who subscribed to his 1725 London edition of Boccaccio's Decameron indicate the range of his British contacts and patrons.

In London Rolli published original poetry and Italian translations and editions of classics not otherwise available, including works of Anacreon, Virgil, Boccaccio, Ariosto, a group of Italian satirists, and Marchetti's famous Italian translation of Lucretius (1717). His Italian translations and editions served both scholarly and pedagogic aims by giving English students easily understandable classic Italian texts. 'Solitario bosco ombroso' in Di canzonette e di cantate (1727) was long considered a model of classical perfection in Italian lyric poetry. In his autobiography Dichtung und Wahrheit (Poetry and Truth), Goethe writes that he learned it by heart even before he knew a word of Italian.

Rolli's most important contribution to Italian letters, his translation of Milton's Paradise Lost, is its first complete Italian translation; Rolli's preface and life of Milton are pioneering pieces of Italian Milton criticism. Despite omissions to avoid offending Roman Catholic sensibilities, the translation landed on the Index. Rolli's translation is literal and smooth, although literalness often overrides the poetic. The first six books, in folio, appeared in London in 1729; the revised, complete poem appeared in 1735 adorned with three portraits, and was dedicated to Frederick, prince of Wales, who supported the publication with £100. The translation quickly acquired a European reputation and was frequently reprinted. In December 1729 Rolli was elected a Fellow of the Royal Society.

=== Royal Academy of Music and Opera of the Nobility ===
When the Royal Academy of Music (a company for producing Italian opera) was organized in 1719, Rolli became its secretary, charged primarily with providing librettos for the house composers; he was dismissed in 1722 following a dispute with the directors. He also prepared librettos for the Opera of the Nobility, established in 1733 as a rival to George Frideric Handel, and for the subsequent company headed by Lord Middlesex. Here he had the opportunity to work with Porpora, and was given more freedom in the choice of subjects, which allowed him to introduce ‘exotic’ elements from French musical theatre. This experiment was discussed by him in the introductions to his Componimenti poetici in vario genere (1744) and De' poetici componimenti, iii (1753). Such ‘contamination’ was, however, criticized after his death by Aurelio de' Giorgi Bertola and Stefano Arteaga.

Because of uncertain attributions and the vague line between original works and adaptations, the number of his librettos is uncertain; but Rolli at least produced more than twenty-four librettos and five adaptations for the London stage. He also worked frequently with composer Giovanni Bononcini writing and adapting numerous librettos for him including his popular Griselda (1722). His librettos were influenced by the consummate works of Metastasio. Rolli's correspondence with his circle of friends (including Giuseppe Riva, Senesino, Antonio Cocchi, and Gio. Giacomo Zamboni) is a wealth of observations and opinions. Rolli delights in entertaining his distant friends with the intrigues, jealousies, manoeuvres, and gossip of the musical and literary life of London.

=== Later years ===
Upon the death of queen Caroline, his royal protectress, in 1737, Rolli left England and returned to Italy, where he published further verse and translations, notably of Racine's plays and Newton's Chronology of Ancient Kingdoms (1757). He settled in Todi, his mother's ancestral home, which had granted him a patent of nobility in 1735. There he spent his last 21 years, with no further involvement in theatrical activities. He died at Todi on 20 March 1765, and was buried there. A posthumous collection of epigrams, Marziale in Albion (1776), satirizes many literary and musical figures of Rolli's London days.

== Works ==
Title page of the libretto of Rolli's Polifemo

=== Operas ===
The names of the first composers to set the respective texts to music are indicated next to the title

- Muzio Scevola (1721) – George Frideric Handel
- Floridante (1721) – George Frideric Handel
- Scipione (1726) – George Frideric Handel
- Alessandro (1726) – George Frideric Handel
- Riccardo Primo (1727) – George Frideric Handel
- Polifemo (1735) – Nicola Porpora
- La festa d'Imeneo (1736) – Nicola Porpora
- Orfeo (1736) – Nicola Porpora
- Deidamia (1741) – George Frideric

=== Poetry collections ===
- Rime. London: Pickard. 1717.
- Canzonette e cantate. London: Pickard. 1727.
- Componimenti poetici in vario genere. Verona: Tumermani. 1744.
- Marziale in Albion. Florence: nella stamperia di Francesco Moucke. 1776.
- Liriche. Con un saggio su La melica italiana dalla seconda metà del Cinquecento al Rolli e al Metastasio e note di Carlo Calcaterra, Turin, UTET, 1926.

=== Translations ===
- Del paradiso perduto. Poema inglese di Giovanni Milton, London, Presso Carlo Bennet, 1736.
- Gli amanti interni; commedia Inglese, London, 1724. Translation of Richard Steele's The Conscious Lovers.
