= Riccardo Primo =

Opera by Georg Friedrich Händel

George Frideric Handel

Riccardo primo, re d'Inghilterra ("Richard the First, King of England", HWV 23) is an opera seria in three acts written by George Frideric Handel for the Royal Academy of Music (1719) . The Italian-language libretto was by Paolo Antonio Rolli, after Francesco Briani's Isacio tiranno, set by Antonio Lotti in 1710. Handel wrote the work for the Royal Academy's 1726–27 opera season, and also as homage to the newly crowned George II and the nation where Handel had just received citizenship.

Riccardo Primo was the third opera Handel composed for the trio of famous star Italian singers, the castrato Senesino and the sopranos Francesca Cuzzoni and Faustina Bordoni.

== Performance history ==
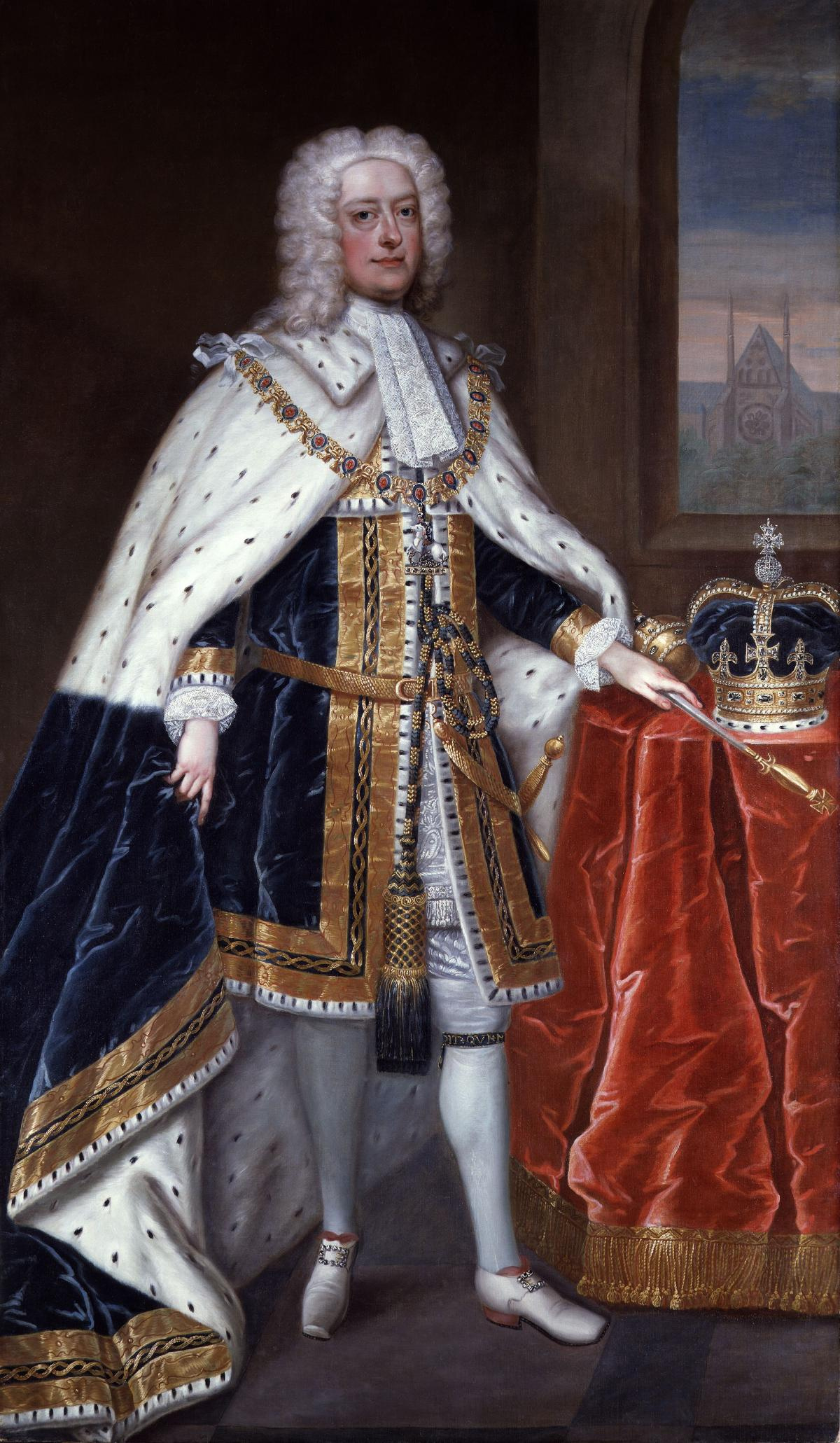
George II in his coronation robes

The opera received its premiere at the King's Theatre in London on 11 November 1727, and eleven subsequent performances. It was also performed in Hamburg and Braunschweig in February 1729. The Hamburg performance, led by none other than Georg Philipp Telemann, included two new comic characters, Murmilla and Gelasius; recitatives and the added arias for the new characters were translated into German although the original arias remained in Italian. Handel subsequently re-used music from the opera in Scipione and Tolomeo. The opera fell into neglect after the 1728 closing of the Royal Academy.

Riccardo Primo was rediscovered and performed by the Handel Opera Society at Sadler's Wells Opera in London on 8 July 1964. Later performances were given at Kourion Amphitheater in Cyprus at 1991, in order to mark the 800th anniversary of the historical events on which the opera is based, at the 1996 Göttingen Festival and at the Händelfestspiele at the Badisches Staatstheater in 2014 and 2015. The work was given its United States premiere, presented as Richard the Lionheart, by Opera Theatre of Saint Louis during the summer 2015 season.

== Roles ==
Rodrigo discography
Role	Voice type	Premiere cast, 11 November 1727
Riccardo	alto castrato	Francesco Bernardi, called "Senesino"
Costanza, daughter of the King of Navarre	soprano	Francesca Cuzzoni
Isacio, Governor of Cyprus	bass	Giuseppe Maria Boschi
Pulcheria, his daughter	soprano	Faustina Bordoni
Oronte, Prince of Syria	alto castrato	Antonio Baldi
Berardo, Costanza's cousin	bass	Giovanni Battista Palmerini

== Synopsis ==
Time: 1191
Place: Cyprus

The story concerns the marriage of Richard I of England to Constanza, a Spanish princess. The character of Costanza is identified with Berengaria of Navarre, who married Richard I at Limassol at 1191. [Prior to the action of the opera, Riccardo and Costanza have not yet met.]

=== Act 1 ===
Cyprus

On her sea journey to be married to Riccardo, Costanza and her party are shipwrecked off the coast of Cyprus. She finds shelter at the court of the local governor, Isacio, pretending that she and her tutor, Berardo, are actually brother and sister, Doride and Narsete, servants of Costanza. Oronte (engaged to Pulcheria) is attracted to 'Doride'. Pulcheria overhears him paying court and is angry. Riccardo arrives, disguised as his kingdom's ambassador, and asks after Costanza. Isacio guesses "Doride's" real identity and promises to give up Costanza to Riccardo.

=== Act 2 ===
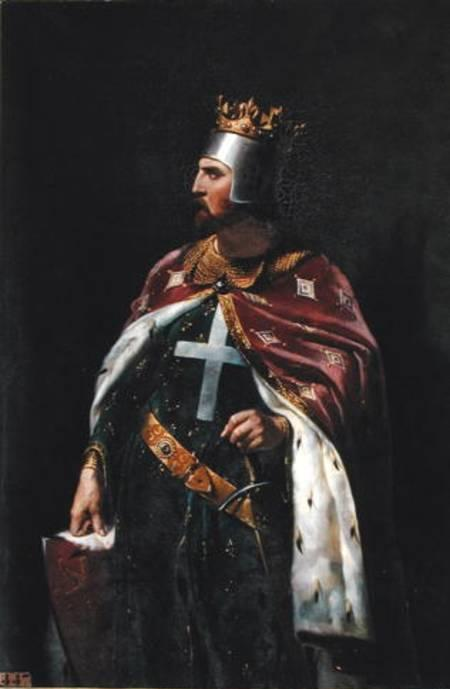
Richard I the Lionheart

Isacio, knowing that Riccardo has never seen his fiancée, proposes to send his daughter Pulcheria to Riccardo in her stead, leaving the way open for his seduction of Costanza, whom he forces to admit her real identity. Pulcheria agrees, out of duty to her father, but intends to reveal the deception at the right moment. Oronte has discovered Isacio's plot through Berardo and stops it at the moment that Riccardo and Pulcheria meet for the first time, which leads Pulcheria to forgive her fiancé. Riccardo is angry upon learning of Isacio's designs and proposes to overthrow the tyrant in alliance with Oronte. He retains his disguise and plans to offer charity towards Isacio in spite of the ill plotting. Speaking "on behalf" of Riccardo, "the Ambassador" offers Isacio the choice of either peace or war. Pulcheria pleads for Costanza and Isacio agrees to bestow her on Riccardo. Pulcheria introduces Riccardo, initially as the 'ambassador, but then revealed as his true self, to Costanza, and act 2 closes with a love duet for Costanza and Riccardo.

=== Act 3 ===
Riccardo tells Oronte how Isacio has gone back on his word and launched an attack against Riccardo at the moment that he was about to leave with Costanza. Despite the help of Oronte's forces, Costanza is taken back by Isacio. Pulcheria, seeing the captive Costanza's distress, offers herself as a hostage to Riccardo's forces. Isacio offers his prisoner his hand in marriage and his throne. Berardo intervenes to announce the renewed approach of the English army. Isacio is defiant. As Riccardo bursts into the palace, Isacio threatens to kill Costanza. As Riccardo is about to concede, Pulcheria seizes a sword and announces she will kill herself if Costanza is harmed. In the following confusion Oronte enters and his superior forces prompt Isacio to flee. The women are left alone to hope for a just victory for Riccardo and Oronte returns to announce that the English king has been victorious. Riccardo dispenses justice as follows. Isacio must renounce his power, but is allowed to live. Pulcheria, with Oronte as her husband, shall reign in place of her father.

== Context and analysis ==
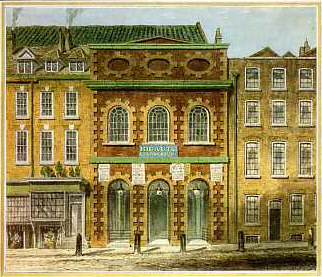
The King's Theatre, London, where Riccardo Primo had its first performance

The German-born Handel, after spending some of his early career composing operas and other pieces in Italy, settled in London, where in 1711 he had introduced Italian opera for the first time with his opera Rinaldo. A tremendous success, Rinaldo created a craze in London for Italian opera seria, a form focused overwhelmingly on solo arias for the star virtuoso singers. In 1719, Handel was appointed music director of an organisation called the Royal Academy of Music (unconnected with the present-day London conservatoire), a company under royal charter to produce Italian operas in London. Handel was not only to compose operas for the company but hire the star singers, supervise the orchestra and musicians, and adapt operas from Italy for London performance.

Handel had composed numerous Italian operas for the Academy, with varying degrees of success; some were enormously popular. The castrato Senesino and the soprano Francesca Cuzzoni had appeared in a succession of Handel operas for the Academy (he was not the only composer who composed operas for the company) most of which had been successful with audiences, and in 1726 the directors of the Academy brought over another internationally renowned singer, Faustina Bordoni, to add to the company's attractions. The two prima donnas had appeared in continental European countries in operas together without incident, but in London they developed rival groups of fans who interrupted the performances with rowdy displays of partisanship for one lady or another. This came to a climax on 6 June 1727 during a performance at the King's Theatre of Astianatte by Giovanni Bononcini with both singers onstage and royalty in the audience. Fist fights and disorder between rival groups of fans broke out in the audience and the two sopranos exchanged insults and came to blows onstage. The rest of the opera was cut, the performers going straight to the short final chorus. The scandal was gleefully repeated in the newspapers, in satirical skits on other stages, and in mock-heroic verse, bringing the entire form of Italian opera into a certain amount of disrepute in London.

Handel had to supply another opera for the trio of star singers, Senesino, Cuzzoni and Faustina (as she was known) even though these singers received astronomical fees, much more than he received for composing the works. Combined with declining audience numbers caused at least in part by the ridicule brought upon Italian opera by the rival sopranos' public spat, these factors were causing severe financial difficulty for the Royal Academy of Music. As one of Handel's most loyal supporters, Mary Delaney, wrote in 1727:

I doubt operas will not survive longer than this winter, they are now at their last gasp; the subscription is expired and nobody will renew it. The directors are all squabbling, and they have so many divisions among themselves that I wonder they have not broke up before. Senesino goes away next winter, and I believe Faustina, so you see harmony is almost out of fashion.

The Royal Academy of Music collapsed at the end of the 1728–29 season, partly due to the huge fees paid to the star singers, and Cuzzoni and Faustina both left London for engagements in continental Europe. Handel started a new opera company with a new prima donna, Anna Strada. One of Handel's librettists, Paolo Rolli, wrote in a letter (the original is in Italian) that Handel said that Strada "sings better than the two who have left us, because one of them (Faustina) never pleased him at all and he would like to forget the other (Cuzzoni)."

The opera was not revived by Handel, although to 18th century musicologist Charles Burney it contained much fine music, including an aria for Faustina, Vado per obedirti, which:

is the most agreeable song of execution of the times. I have been told that the brilliancy of her voice made its way through the busy accompaniment of this song in a manner which filled the whole theatre. A close in this air appears for the first time, which has since become fashionable, as well as the return to the subject in the Da Capo.

R.B. Chatwin has discussed Handel's writing of orchestral parts for the chalumeau, a forerunner of the clarinet, as part of the musicological controversy over whether or not Handel wrote music for the clarinet or its precursors. Winton Dean and Richard Drakeford have commented on the weaknesses of the dramatic characterisations in the libretto.

== Instrumentation ==
The opera is scored for two oboes, bassoon, piccolo, flute, alto flute, three trumpets in D, two horns in D, two chalumeaux, timpani, harpsichord, and strings.

== Recordings ==
Riccardo Primo discography
Year	Cast: Riccardo, Costanza Isacio, Pulcheria, Oronte, Berardo	Conductor, orchestra	Label
1995	Sara Mingardo, Sandrine Piau, Robert Scaltriti, Claire Brua, Olivier Lallouette, Pascal Bertin	Christophe Rousset; Les Talens Lyriques	CD:L'Oiseau Lyre; Cat:452 201-2
2007	Lawrence Zazzo, Núria Rial, David Wilson-Johnson, Geraldine McGreevy, Tim Mead, Curtis Streetman	Paul Goodman; Kammerorchester Basel	CD:Harmonia Mundi; Cat:88697
