= Lawrence Zazzo =

American countertenor (born 1970)

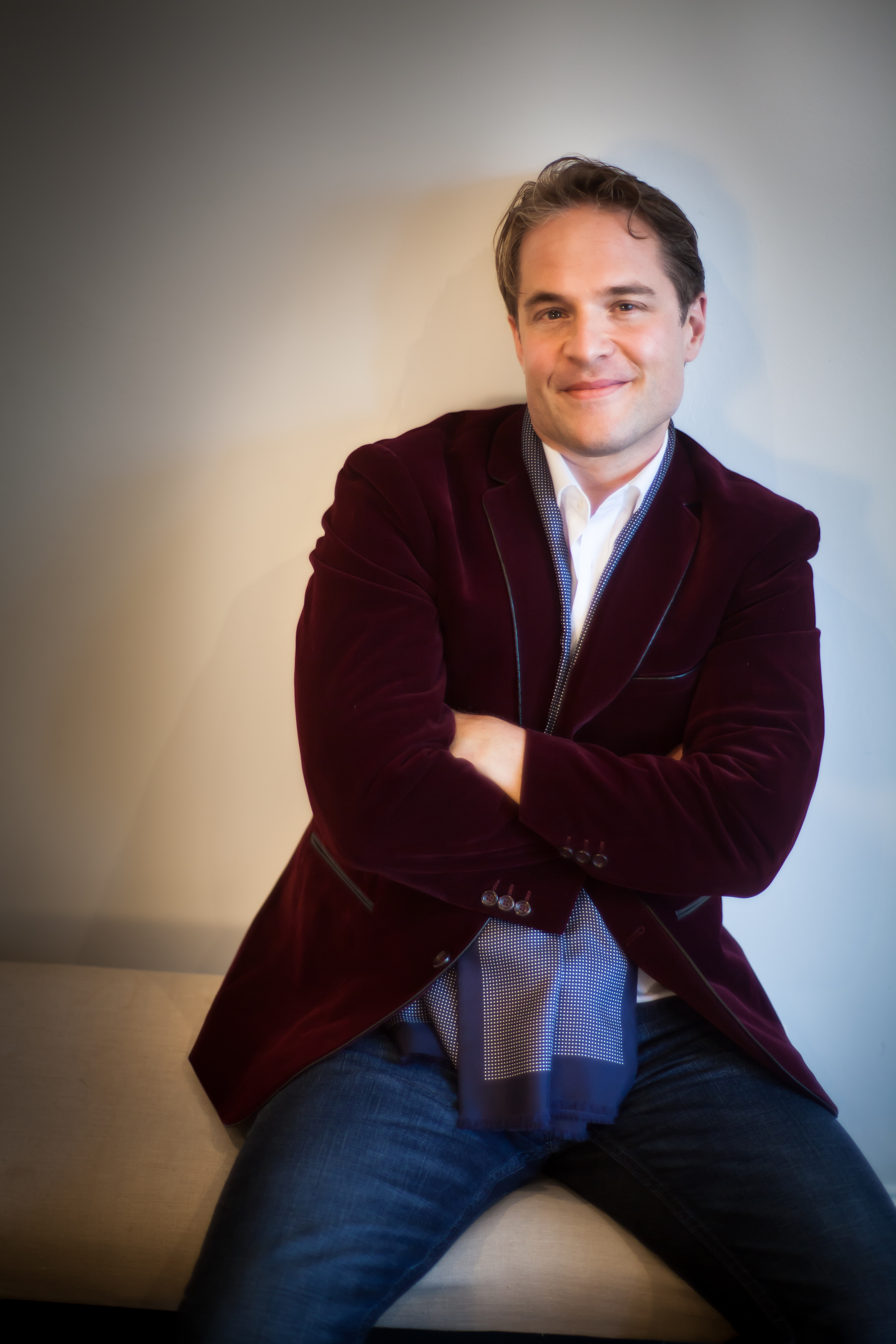
- Zazzo in 2014
- Born: December 15, 1970 (age 55); Philadelphia, US
- Education: Yale University; King's College, Cambridge; Queen's University Belfast; Royal College of Music
- Occupation: countertenor
- Organizations: Newcastle University
- Website: www.lawrencezazzo.com

Lawrence Zazzo (born December 15, 1970) is an American countertenor who has performed at major opera houses in Europe and the US. His repertoire includes Baroque opera and oratorios as well as works of the 20th century.

== Education and background ==
Born in Philadelphia, Zazzo took part in school drama productions and choirs, including the Philadelphia Boys Choir & Chorale, and also performed as the magician "The Great Zazzini" for smaller children in the neighbourhood. After his voice had broken, he noticed that he had kept his alto voice in the falsetto register and began to develop it. He sang in numerous barbershop ensembles, high school madrigal and a cappella choirs. This led to his decision to study English and Music at Yale University (1989–93) and at King's College, Cambridge, England, (1993–95).

Zazzo envisaged a career as a conductor, a concert singer or as an academic (and in fact, Zazzo completed a PhD in Musicology at Queen's University (2015) on Handel's oratorios, which he researched for six years in between singing engagements). While he was completing his vocal studies at the Royal College of Music in London (1995–97), he made his debut as Oberon in Britten's A Midsummer Night's Dream. The same year he sang the title role in Handel's Arminio at the London Handel Festival.

In 2017, Zazzo joined Newcastle University as Head of Performance and Lecturer in Music.

== Performance ==
Zazzo has worked with numerous conductors including René Jacobs, William Christie, Nikolaus Harnoncourt, Ivor Bolton, Christopher Hogwood, Trevor Pinnock, Christophe Rousset, Harry Bicket, Emmanuelle Haïm, Harry Christophers, Paul Goodwin, Péter Eötvös, Rinaldo Alessandrini, Hervé Niquet, Jean-Claude Malgoire, Jordi Savall, James Conlon and others for many opera houses and concert halls.

His major operatic roles include Giulio Cesare in Handel's Giulio Cesare (Metropolitan Opera New York, La Monnaie Brussels, Netherlands Opera Amsterdam, Paris National Opera, English National Opera London, Concertgebouw Amsterdam, Semperoper Dresden, Boston, Oper Frankfurt), Orfeo in Gluck's Orfeo ed Euridice (Oslo Opera House, Canadian Opera Company Toronto, Reisopera Netherlands, New National Theatre Tokyo), Radamisto in Handel's Radamisto (English National Opera London), and Gualtiero in Scarlatti's Griselda (Berlin State Opera). He performed the title roles in Sosarme (Teatro Nacional de São Carlos), in Alessandro (Karlsruhe), in Orlando (Cardiff, Bristol, London) and in Solomon (Royal Opera House London).

He also appeared as Ottone in Handel's Agrippina (La Monnaie Brussels, Théâtre des Champs-Élysées Paris, Oper Frankfurt), as Ottone in Monteverdi's L'incoronazione di Poppea (Bavarian and Berlin State Opera, Theater an der Wien and La Monnaie), as Goffredo in Handel's Rinaldo (Berlin State Opera, Opéra National de Montpellier, Zürich Opera House), as Farnace in Mozart's Mitridate, re di Ponto (Bavarian State Opera Munich), and as Ruggerio in Vivaldi's Orlando furioso (Oper Frankfurt). He was Cardenio in Francesco Bartolomeo Conti's Don Chisciotte in Sierra Morena (Theater an der Wien). He sang the alto part in Purcell's semi-opera The Fairy-Queen (Berliner Philharmonie) and the role of Arsace in Partenope (Théâtre des Champs-Élysées Paris, Ferrol, Amsterdam, Pamplona, Essen and Madrid). In the German premiere of Francesco Cavalli's Veremonda, he appeared as Delio (Schlosstheater Schwetzingen, Staatstheater Mainz). He performed the role of Arsamene in Handel's Serse (Oper Frankfurt) Unulfo in Handel's Rodelinda (Teatro Real Madrid) and Bertarido in Rodelinda Opéra National de Lyon. He sang the title role in Giustino (Stadthalle Osterode) and Tamerlano (Oper Frankfurt at the Bockenheimer Depot, Deutsches Theater Göttingen).

His repertoire includes numerous oratorios by Georg Friedrich Händel, for example Messiah (Shanghai Opera, Notre Dame Cathedral, Konzerthaus, Vienna, Winchester Cathedral, Munich Residenz, Jones Hall), Semele (Kölner Philharmonie, Concertgebouw, Concertzaal Gent), Theodora (Chan Centre for the Performing Arts Vancouver, Théâtre des Champs-Élysées, Theater an der Wien), Jephtha (Stefaniensaal Graz), Acis and Galatea (Théâtre des Champs-Élysées, Theater an der Wien), Samson (Beaune, Namur), Saul (Beaune, Namur) – He performed the alto parts in Bach's St Matthew Passion (Harris Theater (Chicago), Ambronay, De Doelen Rotterdam) and St John Passion (Chicago, Kölner Philharmonie, Leeds). Further the role Disinganno in Il trionfo del Tempo e del Disinganno at the Salzburg Whitsun Festival.

He has also appeared in several roles in contemporary works, among others as Oberon in Britten's A Midsummer Night's Dream (Opéra National de Lyon, Canadian Opera Company Toronto, Teatro all 'Opera di Roma, Aix-en-Provence Festival, Poly Theater Beijing, Hamburg State Opera, Scottish Opera), as Trinculo in The Tempest (Royal Opera House Covent Garden), as the Refugee in Flight (Glyndebourne Festival) and as Masha in Tri sestry (Three Sisters) (Opéra National de Lyon, La Monnaie, Theater an der Wien). He sang the role of Odysseus in the world premiere of Rolf Riehm's Sirenen (Oper Frankfurt). Furthermore he sang in the world premiere performance of Riehm's The Deaths of Orpheus and of Geoff Page's monodrama Paradise Lost based on John Milton's Paradise Lost.

== Discography ==
- 1995 Celebration of the Spirit, incl. Leonard Bernsteins "Chichester Psalms", DVD (Brilliant Classics) an CD (Columns Classics)
- 1995 Gloria (Brilliant Classics)
- 1996 Arianna, live-recording (NMC Records)
- 1996 Stabat Mater, CD (Brilliant Classics) and DVD (United Classics)
- 2001 Deborah, live recording (Naxos)
- 2003 Griselda (Harmonia Mundi)
- 2003 Rinaldo (Harmonia Mundi)
- 2004 Lotario (highlights), live recording (Oehms Classics)
- 2004 Serse (Virgin Classics)
- 2005 Partenope (Chandos Records)
- 2005 Saul (Harmonia Mundi)
- 2006 Messiah (Harmonia Mundi)
- 2007 Byrdland with the Paragon Saxophon Quartett (Landor)
- 2007 Fernando (Virgin Classics)
- 2008 Duetti amorosi with Nuria Rial (Harmonia Mundi)
- 2008 Riccardo Primo (Harmonia Mundi)
- 2010 Athalia (Harmonia Mundi)
- 2011 Lunarcy with Shizuku Noiri (lute) (Evil Penguin Records)
- 2012 Alessandro, live-recording (Pan Classics)
- 2012 Apollo et Hyacinthus (Linn Records)
- 2012 Giulio Cesare, live-DVD (Virgin Classics)
- 2012 Mozart In-Between (Sony Classical Records)
- 2014: Mitridate, re di Ponto (Signum Records)
- 2014: A Royal Trio (Harmonia Mundi USA)
- 2014: Messiah (BR-Klassik)
- 2018: Xerxes, Live-blu-ray (UNITEL)
- 2019: The Orchestral Music of Jonathan Dove (Orchid Classics)
- 2019: Gender Stories (Deutsche Harmonia Mundi)
- 2019: Handel uncaged (Inventa Records)
- 2020: Samson, live recording (Ricercar)
- 2021: Proud Songsters - English Solo Song King's College, Cambridge
- 2021: Semele, live recording (Ricercar)
- 2022: Ihr, meine und eines ruchlosen Vaters Kinder - Die Tode des Orpheus (Kreuzberg Records)
- 2024: Weeping Philosophers (Pan Classics)
