= Robert Wolak =

Polish mathematician

Robert Antoni Wolak
- Born: 19 September 1955 (age 70); Poland
- Education: Jagiellonian University(1979)
- Scientific career
- Fields: Mathematics
- Workplaces: Jagiellonian University
- Thesis: (PhD) 1982; Geometric Structures on Manifolds with Foliations (Habilitation) 1 January 1992; Professorship 8 January 2019
- Doctoral advisor: Andrzej Zajtz
- Website: apacz.matinf.uj.edu.pl/users/210-robert-wolak

Robert Antoni Wolak (born September 19, 1955) is a Polish mathematician, habilitated doctor of mathematical sciences. He specializes in differential geometry, foliation theory and differential topology. Associate professor of the Department of Geometry of the Institute of Mathematics, Faculty of Mathematics and Computer Science of the Jagiellonian University.
