= Ewa Wolak =

Polish politician (born 1960)

Member of the Sejm
- In office 25 September 2005 – 2015
- Constituency: 3 – Wrocław

Personal details
- Born: 1960 (age 65–66)
- Party: Civic Platform

Ewa Wanda Wolak (born 1 June 1960 in Wrocław) is a Polish politician. She was elected to the Sejm on 25 September 2005, getting 3465 votes in 3 Wrocław district as a candidate from the Civic Platform list. She ended her term in 2015.

== See also ==
- Members of Polish Sejm 2005-2007
