= Francesca Bertolli =

Italian opera singer

Francesca Bertolli (? Rome – 9 January 1767, in Bologna) was an Italian contralto of the 18th century. She is best remembered for her association with the composer George Frideric Handel, in whose operas she sang.

Details of her early career are not known, but by 1728 she was in service to the Grand Duchess of Tuscany, singing at Bologna and Livorno. After the initial Royal Academy folded, Handel set up a second company of the same name, based at the King's Theatre, and for this purpose, in 1729, he engaged Bertolli. She performed in approximately 15 of his operas, as well as works by Ariosti and a number of pasticcios. In 1733, however, she defected to the rival Opera of the Nobility, along with Senesino and Antonio Montagnana, where she sang in operas by Nicola Porpora (such as Polifemo) and Bononcini, in addition to Handel's Ottone.

In 1736, however, she returned to Handel for another year and performed in 4 or 5 of his works. Upon the conclusion of this second engagement, she returned to Italy, where she continued to sing until retiring from the stage in 1742. Her retirement was not total, for she is known to have sung in a private concert alongside Antonio Bernacchi at Bologna in 1746.

Her Handel roles included (amongst others) Armindo in Partenope, Medoro in Orlando, Ramisa in Arminio, and Selene in Berenice. She specialised in trouser roles, and was renowned for her good looks: Mrs Pendarves, a close friend of Handel and commentator on the operatic scene of the time, labelled her "a perfect beauty, quite a Cleopatra". Her physical excellence brought the fruitless attentions of the Prince of Wales in 1733, but her voice did not match her features. Mrs Pendarves thought little of her ability as a singer, and her roles indicate a lack of virtuosity and range. Despite this, no other singer apart from Senesino and Anna Maria Strada performed so often in Handel's operatic works.

== Sources ==
- Winton Dean: "Bertolli, Francesca", Grove Music Online ed L. Macy (Accessed 25 September 2009), grovemusic.com, subscription access.
