= Anna Maria Strada =

Italian soprano

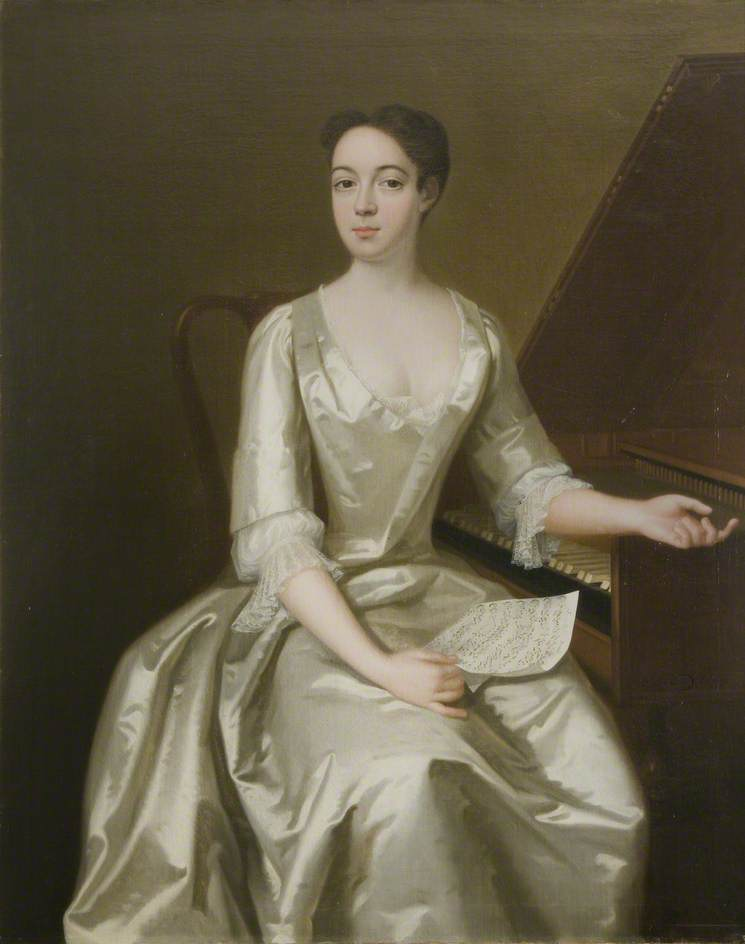
Anna Maria Strada by John Verelst (circa 1732)

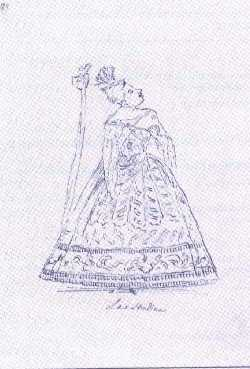
Caricature of Anna Strada by Antonio Maria Zanetti

Anna Maria Strada, also known as Anna Maria Strada del Pò, (* 1703 in Bergamo; † July 20, 1775 in Naples) was an Italian soprano. She is best remembered for her association with the composer George Frideric Handel, in whose operas Strada sang.

== Career ==
After an initial career in Italy that included performances at Venice — in Vivaldi's opera La verità in cimento (1720) — Milan, and Livorno, Strada moved to London in 1729 to sing for Handel after the composer engaged her for his operas. She made her début as Adelaida in Lotario and was prima donna in all his operas and oratorios until 1737. She sang in a minimum of 24 of Handel's operas and the opera-ballet Terpsicore, a new prologue to a revision of Il pastor fido. Her roles included Angelica in Orlando, the title role in Partenope, Elmira in Sosarme, Thusnelda in Arminio, and Ariadne in Giustino, and the title role of Atalanta.

Strada was the only singer of Handel's company who did not defect to the rival Opera of the Nobility in 1733, and in 1732 had turned down the opportunity to sing for Giovanni Bononcini. She left London, however, in 1738 and returned to Italy, where she sang at Naples and Turin before her retirement to Bergamo.

== Contemporary evaluations ==
18th-century music historian Charles Burney described Strada thus:

A singer formed by himself [Handel], and modelled on his own melodies. She came hither a coarse and awkward singer with improvable talents, and he at last polished her into reputation and favour … Strada’s personal charms did not assist her much in conciliating parties, or disposing the eye to augment the pleasures of the ear; for she had so little of a Venus in her appearance, that she was usually called the Pig. However, by degrees she subdued all their prejudices, and sung herself into favour.

Further evidence of Strada's unusual ugliness is provided by Mrs Pendarves — formerly known as Mary Granville and later Mrs Delany — a close friend of Handel.

La Strada is the first woman; her voice is without exception fine, her manner perfection, but her person very bad, and she makes frightful mouths.

Poet and librettist Paolo Rolli described her as "a copy of Faustina with a better voice and better intonation, but without her charm and brio". Her Handel parts reveal her vocal range to have been two octaves during the first part of her career, and the dramatic range required by these roles is varied. While in Naples during the first part of her career, Strada married theatre manager and librettist Aurelio del Pò, reputedly because he owed her a large sum of money and married her as a substitute for payment.
