= Opera of the Nobility =

The Opera of the Nobility (or Nobility Opera) was an opera company set up and funded in 1733 by a group of nobles (under Frederick, Prince of Wales) opposed to George II of Great Britain, in order to rival the (Second) Royal Academy of Music company under Handel (backed by George II and his queen).

Nicola Porpora was invited to be its musical director and Owen Swiny considered as its talent scout. The company had Senesino (who had fallen out with Handel) as its lead singer and was based at a theatre at Lincoln's Inn Fields under John Rich which had become available on Rich's opening of the Theatre Royal, Covent Garden. The company's first opera was Arianna in Nasso by Porpora, a direct challenge to Handel's Arianna in Creta.

The company was not a success in its initial 1733–34 season. Though Farinelli joined it late in the season and thus made it financially solvent, he was unable to prevent its eventual bankruptcy. At the end of its initial season it took over the King's Theatre from Handel.

The company went bankrupt and was dissolved in 1737 (shortly after appointing Giovanni Battista Pescetti its musical director), but not before it had poached some of Handel's best singers such as Francesca Cuzzoni and Antonio Montagnana and forced his company into bankruptcy too. The remnants of the two companies combined at the King's Theatre for the 1737–38 season. A second Opera of the Nobility was formed in 1741 by the Earl of Middlesex, but it did not survive for long.

== Sources ==
- A short history of opera
