= Livia Nannini Costantini =

Italian soprano of the Baroque period

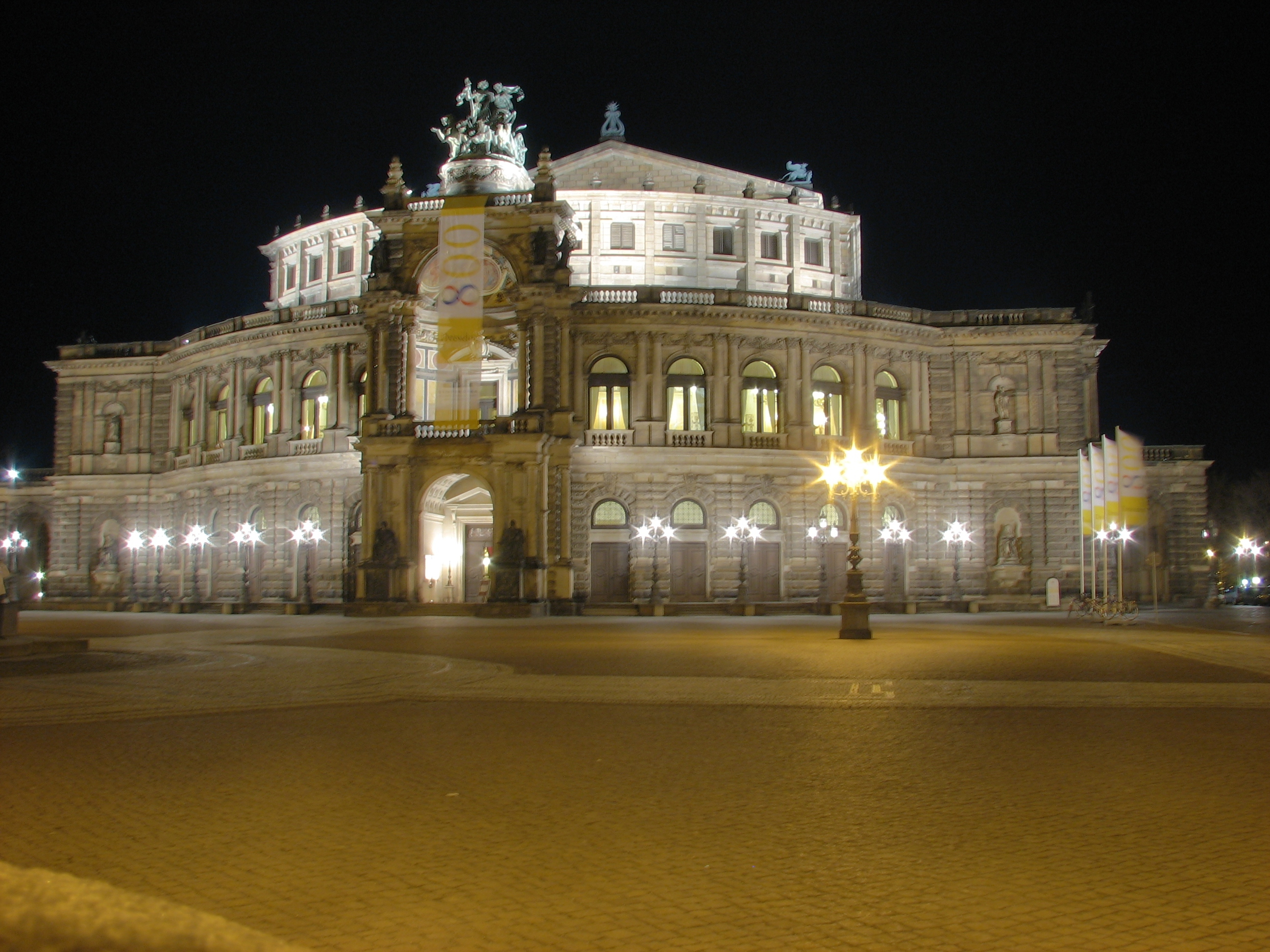
Semperoper

Livia Nannini Costantini (fl. 1695 – c. 1726) was an Italian soprano. She was one of four sopranos of her period known by the moniker "La Polacchina"; a situation which has led to some confusion in scholarship on the singer.

== Life ==
There is very little biographical information about this singer; we know that she was born in Bologna. The year of her birth is not known and the first records of the singer date to the year 1695.

The family was of Bolognese origin, Livia was the daughter of Giovanni Nannini, apparently connected in some way to the Court of Mantua, and of Margherita, who may also have been a singer; she had two sisters, the soprano Lucia Vittoria Nannini and the soprano Francesca Nannini and it seems that the three sisters were all known by the nickname "Le Polacchine", so much so that there is some confusion among music historians about this. According to the Italian historiographer Francesco Saverio Quadrio there were even four singers known as "Le Polacchine".

== Career ==
There is also no information on her musical training: the beginnings of her career were in Naples, where she had her first successes. There is news of the Neapolitan theatre season of 1697–1698, remembered as memorable because the king had beautiful scenery set and hired new singers, including Nannini. From about 1700 to 1705, her career was intense; in this period he seemed to assert himself particularly in the comic genre and it was in these years that he met and collaborated with some of the most famous singers of the time such as Nicolò Grimaldi, called Nicolini, Matteo Sassano known as Matteuccio, Vittoria Tarquini, known as la Bombace, Maria Maddalena Musi, known as la Mignatti, who would be her rival for a long time, the famous Neapolitan castrato Nicola Paris, known as Nicolino and the bass Giovanni Battista Cavana.

In 1697 she was Virginia in La Caduta de' Decemviri, in 1698 Muzio Scevola, in 1700 she played Livio in Eraclea and sang in Il Pastor di Corinto, both by Alessandro Scarlatti. In Naples in 1702 she performed in Tiberio imperatore Oriente and in Semiramide by Vivaldi in Modena, where a sonnet was dedicated in her honour as a token of appreciation. She returned again to Naples to interpret the part of Bellina in Il Più Fedel tra i vassalli by Giuseppe Aldrovandini, in 1705.

In 1709, there was a short interlude in her intense activity because Livia got married in Vienna to the famous actor Angelo Costantini, an established performer of the then emerging Commedia dell'arte, for whom it was his second marriage.

In 1710, she sang in Gli amanti generosi by Francesco Mancini with Nicolini in Genoa and in 1713 she performed in Cassandra Indovina by Nicola Fago. In the same year, with his colleague and favourite comic companion, the bass Cavana, she performed in Basilio, re d'Oriente by Nicola Porpora and sang the comic interludes of Domenico Sarro inserted in Il Comando non inteso ed ubbidito by Antonio Lotti at the Teatro dei Fiorentini.

== Dresden ==
Some sources indicate that in 1716 she moved to Madrid with the Costantini troupe, but according to others it is more likely that she went to Dresden, also because in Germany the best singers in Europe were being gathered at that time: Senesino, Santa Stella, Margherita Durastanti, Vittoria Tesi, Giuseppe Maria Boschi, Francesco Guicciardi etc. In 1717, he joined their singing company performing, among other works, Gli odii delusi dal sangue and Vespetta in Giove in Argo by Lotti. The official date of her stay in Dresden is 1718, according to the archives. Polacchina remained with them until 1720 when the company was disbanded because the castrati Senesino and Berselli had insulted the composer Johann David Heinichen. In 1724, she seems to have returned with her husband to Verona, where she had to survive on a rather low pension and therefore her stay there did not last long.

In the meantime, her musical characteristics had matured and only comic roles were not suitable for her, as she had proved herself capable of playing dramatic characters as well.

== London and Handel ==
It was probably for this reason that Handel noticed her and engaged her for the 1725–1726 season in London. It is possible that the composer had heard Nannini sing in Dresden in 1719. There, she found her Dresden colleague Senesino and sang as Matilda in Ottone and on 12 March 1726 was one of the performers at the premiere of the opera Scipione at Her Majesty's Theatre in London with Francesca Cuzzoni, the castrato Antonio Baldi and the bass Giuseppe Maria Boschi.

After 1726 there are no more records about Livia Nannini Costantini's activities or whereabouts. The date and place of her death are not known.
