= Royal Academy of Music (company) =

Company founded to support the performance of operas by Händel in London

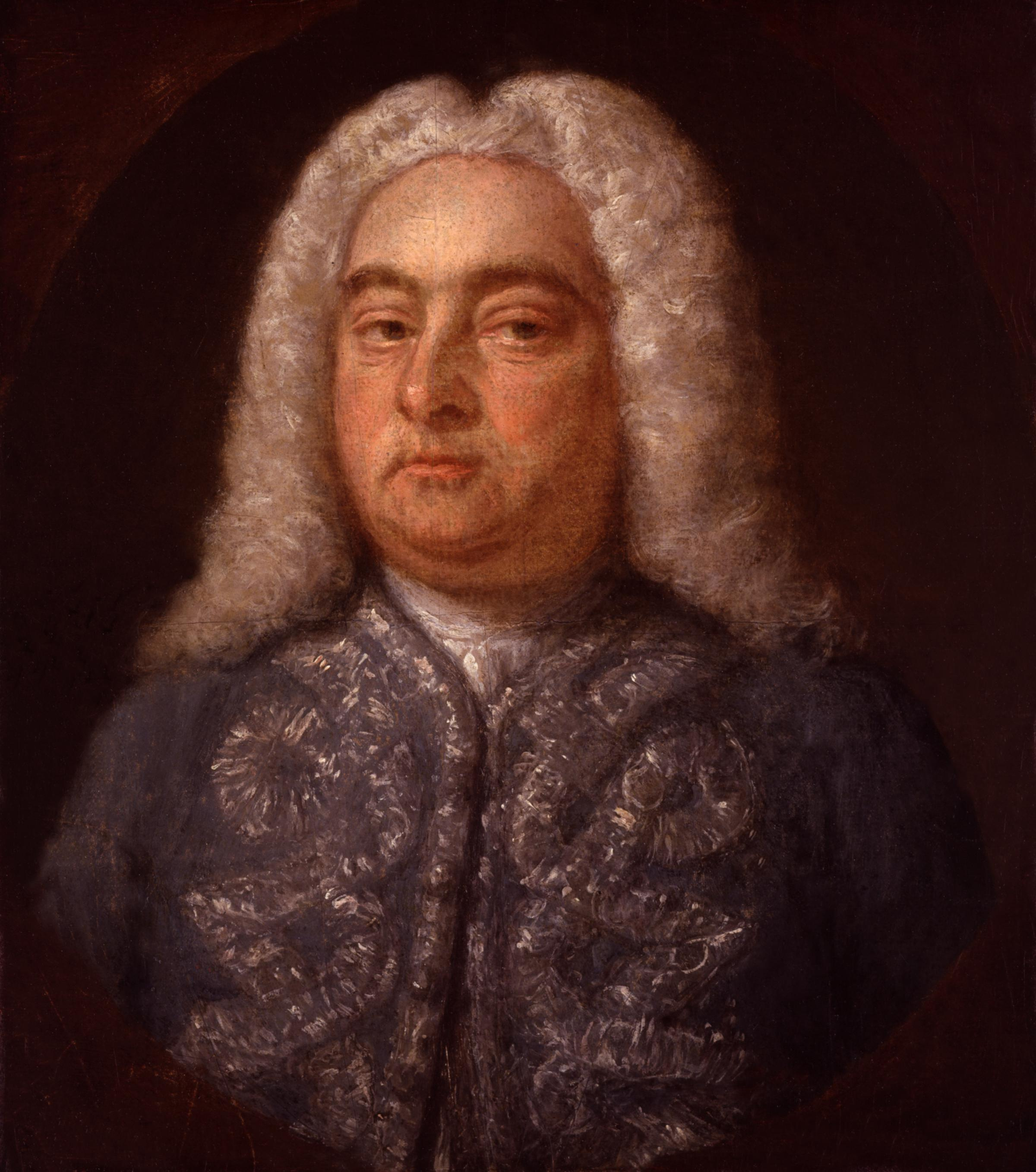
Handel by Francis Kyte (fl. 1710–1744), National Portrait Gallery.

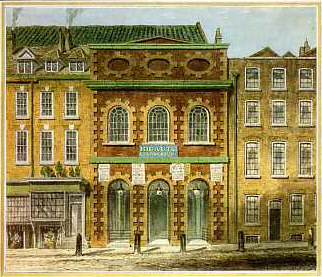
The King's Theatre on the Haymarket (London) by William Capon.

The Royal Academy of Music was a company founded in February 1719, during George Frideric Handel's residence at Cannons, by a group of aristocrats to secure themselves a constant supply of opera seria. It is not connected to the London conservatoire with the same name, which was founded in 1822.

It commissioned large numbers of new operas from three of the leading composers in Europe: Handel, Attilio Ariosti and Giovanni Bononcini. The Academy took the legal form of a joint-stock corporation under letters patent issued by George I of Great Britain for a term of 21 years with a governor, a deputy governor and at least fifteen directors. The (first) Royal Academy lasted for only nine seasons instead of twenty-one, but both the New or Second Academy and the Opera of the Nobility seem to have operated under its Royal Charter until the expiry of the original term.

Handel was appointed as Master of the orchestra responsible not only for engaging soloists but also for adapting operas from abroad and for providing possible libretti for his own use, generally provided from Italy.

Initially the librettist Paolo Antonio Rolli was the "Italian secretary of the Academy"; he was replaced by Nicola Francesco Haym within a few years.

== The subscribers ==
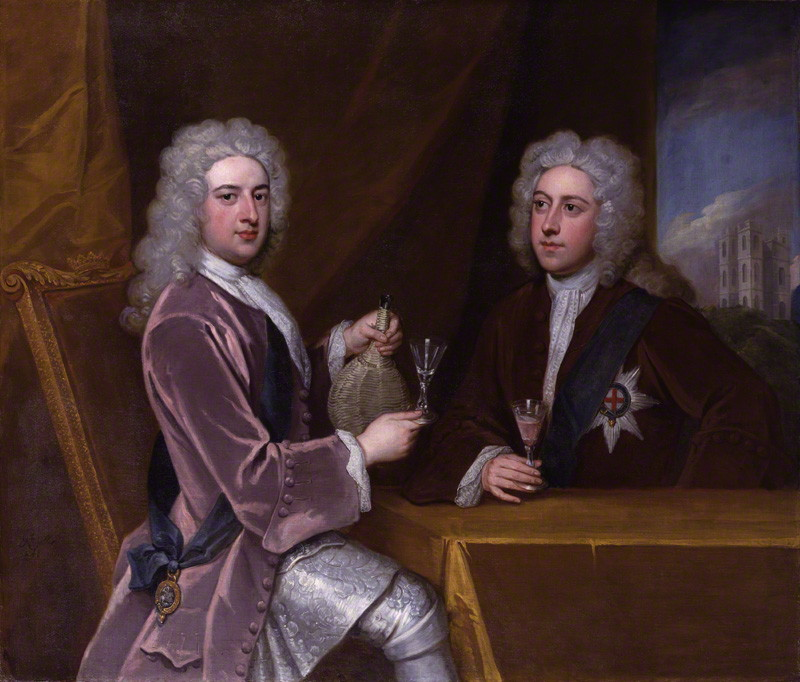
The duke of Newcastle (left) and the Earl of Lincoln, brothers-in-law as painted by Godfrey Kneller, c. 1721.

The capital of £10,000 was divided into 50 shares of £200 each. Sixty-three people initially subscribed for shares. The issue was rapidly oversubscribed: several took more than one share: Lord Burlington subscribed £1000. Otto Erich Deutsch printed a list of 63 names, a later list by Charles Burney carried 73 names. The extra ten were perhaps those admitted at the directors' meetings on 30 November and 2 December 1719. This would give a total capital of £17,600.

The first twelve and main subscribers listed, were the Lord Chamberlain Duke of Kent appointed as governor but never on duty as such, followed by the Duke of Newcastle as governor, the Duke of Grafton, the Duke of Portland, the Duke of Manchester the deputy governor, the Duke of Chandos, the Duke of Montrose, the Earl of Sunderland, the Earl of Rochester, the Earl of Berkeley, the Earl of Burlington, the Earl of Litchfield and the Earl of Lincoln. In 1723 the Academy paid a dividend of seven percent. It was the only dividend they ever paid.

== Directors ==
John Vanbrugh and Colonel John Blathwayt, noted for his musical talents who had studied harpsichord under Alessandro Scarlatti, seem to have been the only two competent directors. Other directors were Lord Bingley, Mr James Bruce, Mr Benjamin Mildmay, 1st Earl FitzWalter, Mr Bryan Fairfax, Mr George Harrison, Mr (Thomas?) Smith, Mr Francis Whitworth (a brother of Charles Whitworth), Doctor John Arbuthnot, Mr John James Heidegger, the Duke of Queensbury, the Earl of Stair, the Earl of Waldegrave, Lord Chetwind, Lord Stanhope, Thomas Coke of Norfolk, Conyers Darcy, Brigadier-General Dormer, Colonel O'Hara, Brigadier-General Hunter, William Poultney and Major-General Wade.

The dancing master and choreographer Anthony L'Abbé played a role in the founding of the Royal Academy of Music in 1719, and choreographed productions in 1719-1720.

== Musicians ==
On 14 May 1719 Handel was ordered by the Lord Chamberlain and governor of the corporation, the Duke of Newcastle, to look for new singers. Handel travelled to Dresden to attend the newly built opera house. He saw Teofane by Antonio Lotti, composed for the wedding of August III of Poland, and engaged leading members of the cast on behalf of the Royal Academy of Music. In April 1720 the Academy began producing operas. The orchestra consisted of seventeen violins, two violas, four cellos, two double basses, four oboes, three bassoons, a theorbo and a trumpet.

The brothers Prospero and Pietro Castrucci as well as Johan Helmich Roman and John Jones were violinists. Bononcini was a cellist, he and Handel presumably accompanied the recitatives in all the operas. Filippo Amadei, one of the composers of Muzio Scevola, also played cello, Pietro Giuseppe Sandoni, who would soon marry Francesca Cuzzoni, was the second harpsichord player. John Baptist Grano was the trumpeter, John Festing played oboe; Charles Frederick Weideman was the flautist and oboist and is also known from his appearance in The Enraged Musician.

The first opera staged by the Academy was Numitore composed by Giovanni Porta, the second was Radamisto by Handel and the third Narciso by Domenico Scarlatti.

== Operas and singers ==
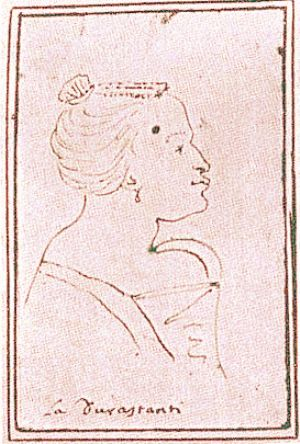
A caricature of Margherita Durastanti, drawn while she was prima donna at the Teatro San Giovanni Grisostomo, Venice, between 1709 and 1712.

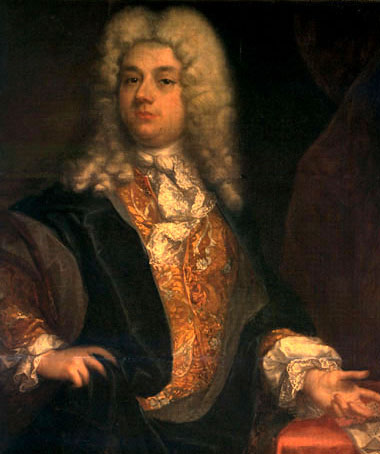
Senesino, c. 1720, engaged by the Academy for as long as possible.

Extravagant fees were offered to entice the best performers from Italy. For Margherita Durastanti in the role of Radamisto, Handel wrote one of his favourite arias, Ombra cara di mia sposa. The great singers who were to be the brightest stars of the Royal Academy during the next few years, such as the castrato Senesino and the soprano Francesca Cuzzoni, had not yet arrived in London. Senesino had obligations to fulfill and arrived in September 1720, accompanied by a group of outstanding singers: the castrato Matteo Berselli, the soprano Maddalena Salvai and the bass Giuseppe Boschi.

Handel used the libretto of Teofane for his Ottone, with Cuzzoni as prima donna. It became his most successful opera in the years of the Academy. In 1724 and 1725 Handel wrote several masterpieces: Giulio Cesare, (1724) with many da capo arias that became famous, and Anastasia Robinson as Cornelia. Not a castrato but a tenor, Francesco Borosini, sang the leading role of Bajazet in Handel's most powerfully tragic opera Tamerlano (also 1724). Insisting on adding the death of Bajazet he had a direct role in shaping the climax of the work. Charles Burney called the prison scene's "Chi di voi" in Rodelinda (1725) "one of the finest pathetic airs that can be found in all [Handel's] works." Eventually Bononcini was dismissed, and went into private service, Robinson retired and Joseph Goupy may have been employed as a scene-painter.

In February 1726 Handel revived his Ottone, which had been spectacularly successful at its first performances in 1723 and was again a hit at its revival, with a London newspaper reporting

Handel had the satisfaction of seeing an Old Opera of his not only fill the House, which had not been done for some time, but above three hundred turn'd away for want of room.

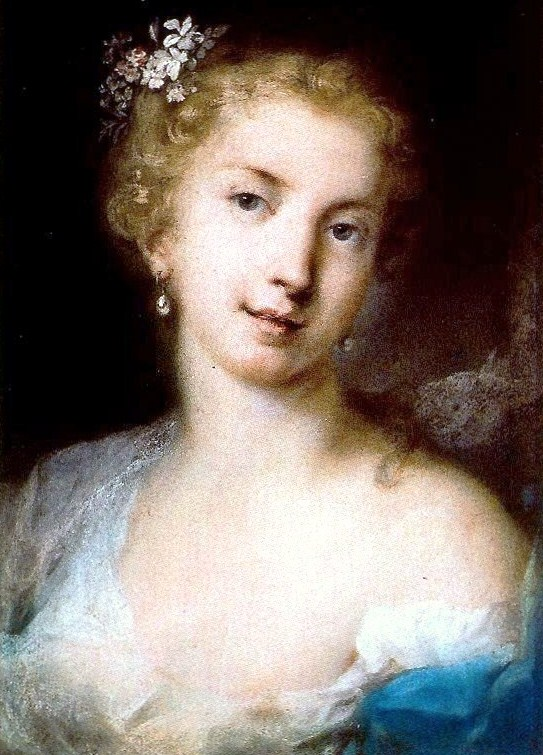
Francesca Cuzzoni (1696–1778).

As the newspaper notes, full houses were by no means a regular occurrence by that time, and the directors of the Royal Academy of Music decided to increase audiences' interest by bringing another celebrated international opera star, Italian soprano Faustina Bordoni, to join established London favourites Francesca Cuzzoni and the star castrato Senesino in the company's performances. Many opera companies in Italy featured two leading ladies in one opera and Faustina (as she was known) and Cuzzoni had appeared together in opera performances in various European cities with no trouble; there is no indication that there was any bad feeling or ill-will between the two of them prior to their London joint appearances.

The three stars, Bordoni, Cuzzoni and Senesino commanded astronomical fees, making much more money from the opera seasons than Handel did. The opera company would have been aware that the story of the two princesses in love with Alexander the Great chosen for the two prima donnas' first joint appearance in Handel's Alessandro was familiar to London audiences through a tragedy by Nathaniel Lee, The Rival Queens, or the Death of Alexander the Great, first performed in 1677 and often revived and it may be that they were encouraging the idea that the two singers were rivals. One of the agents who had arranged Faustina's appearances in London, Owen Swiny, explicitly warned against the choice of libretto as likely to cause "disorder" in a letter to the directors of the Royal Academy of Music, imploring them:

...never to consent to any thing that can put the Academy into disorder, as it must, certainly, if what I hear … is put in Execution: I mean the opera of Alexander the great; where there is to be a Struggle between the Rival Queen’s, for a Superiority.

The performances of Alessandro went off with no signs of animosity between Bordoni and Cuzzoni or their respective supporters, but it was not very long after that tension between the two erupted. As 18th century musicologist Charles Burney observed about the Cuzzoni / Faustina rivalry:

it seems impossible for two singers of equal merit to tread the stage a parte eguale, as for two people to ride on the same horse, without one being behind.

Handel's next opera, Admeto, again with roles for both sopranos, was well-received and had nineteen performances in its initial run, a mark of success for those times.

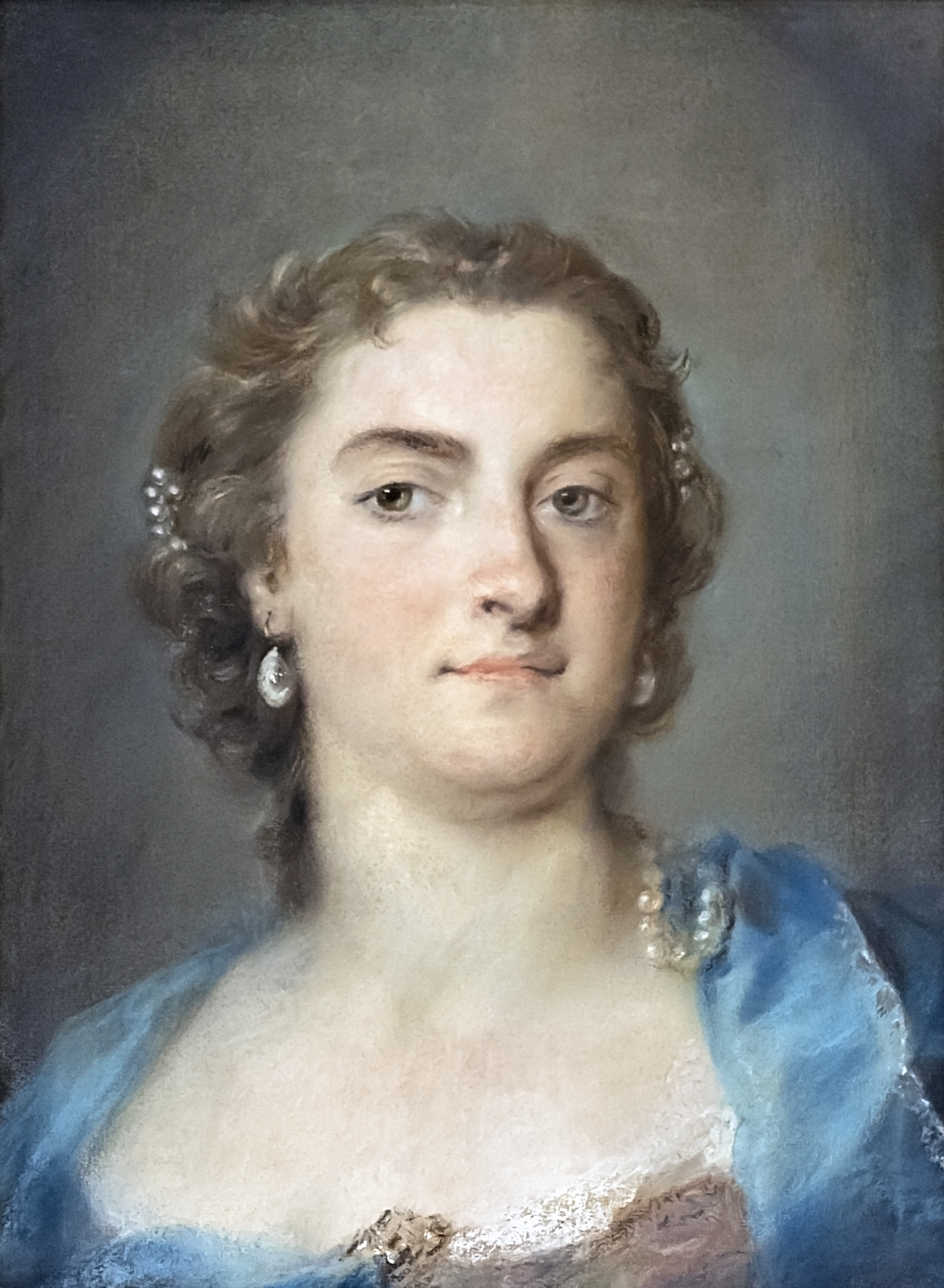
Faustina Bordoni (1697–1781).

Many audience members were extremely enthusiastic about the singers. At the conclusion of one of Cuzzoni's arias at a performance of the original run, a man in the gallery called out "Damn her: she has got a nest of nightingales in her belly".

However, some members of the London audience had become fiercely partisan in favouring either Bordoni or Cuzzoni and disliking the other and at the performance of Admeto on 4 April 1727 with members of the royal family present, elements of the audience were extremely unruly, hissing and interrupting the performance with cat-calls when the "rival" to their favourite was performing, causing public scandal. Cuzzoni issued a public apology to the royal family through one of her supporters:

...Cuzzoni had been publicly told...she was to be hissed off the stage on Tuesday; she was in such concern at this, that she had a great mind not to sing, but I...positively ordered her not to quit the stage, but let them do what they would...and she owns now that if she had not had that order she would have quitted the stage when they cat-called her to such a degree in one song, that she was not heard one note, which provoked the people that liked her so much, that they were not able to get the better of their resentment, but would not suffer the Faustina to speak afterwards.

These sorts of disturbances continued however, climaxing that June in a performance at the Academy of an opera by Giovanni Bononcini, Astianatte. With royalty again present in the person of the Princess of Wales, Cuzzoni and Faustina were onstage together and members of the audience who were supporters of one of the prima donnas were loudly protesting and hissing whenever the other one sang. Actual fist fights broke out in the audience between rival groups of "fans" and Cuzzoni and Faustina stopped singing, began trading insults and finally came to blows onstage and had to be dragged apart. The British Journal of 10 June reported:

On Tuesday-night last, a great disturbance happened at the Opera, occasioned by the Partisans of the Two Celebrated Rival Ladies, Cuzzoni and Faustina. The Contention at first was only carried on by Hissing on one side, and Clapping on the other; but proceeded at length to Catcalls, and other great Indecencies: And notwithstanding the Princess Caroline was present, no Regards were of force to restrain the Rudeness of the Opponents....(the two singers) pull'd each others' coiffs (hair)...it is certainly an apparent Shame that two such well-bred ladies should call each other Bitch and Whore, should Scold and Fight like any Billingsgates (fishmongers).

The performance was abandoned, creating an enormous scandal reported gleefully in newspapers and pamphlets, satirised in John Gay's The Beggar's Opera of 1728, and tainting the entire reputation of Italian opera in London with disrepute in the eyes of many. The most popular account of the onstage fight between the two prima donnas was The Devil To Pay at St. James's: Or, A Full And True Account of a Most Horrible And Bloody Battle Between Madam Faustina And Madam Cuzzoni, Etc, an anonymous poem in rhyming couplets.

Despite this fiasco, both ladies continued to appear together onstage in several more operas presented by the Academy, among them Siroe by Handel, the first time he used a libretto originally by Pietro Metastasio.

The Royal Academy of Music collapsed at the end of the 1728 – 29 season, partly due to the huge fees paid to the star singers, and Cuzzoni and Faustina both left London for engagements in continental Europe. Handel started a new opera company with a new prima donna, Anna Strada. One of Handel's librettists, Paolo Rolli, wrote in a letter (the original is in Italian) that Handel said that Strada "sings better than the two who have left us, because one of them (Faustina) never pleased him at all and he would like to forget the other (Cuzzoni)."

The death of George I caused the performance of Riccardo Primo to be postponed until the next season and prompted both librettist Paolo Rolli and composer to make significant changes to their work. They decided to give the patriotic drum a good thump by adding gratuitous references to British valour, justice and power. In 1728 John Gay's The Beggar's Opera premiered at Lincoln's Inn Fields Theatre and ran for 62 consecutive performances, the longest run in theatre history up to that time. It marked the beginning of a change in London musical taste and fashion, away from Italian opera in favour of something less highbrow, more home-grown, and more easily intelligible. The 1727–28 season boasted three new operas, but in 1729 the directors agreed to suspend activity after losing money. Not Handel, he had been the only one on their pay list. He immediately started a New or Second Academy of Music.

The Royal Academy produced 461 performances, 235 were works by Handel: 13 operas. Eight operas were by Bononcini (114 performances) and seven operas by Ariosti (54 performances).

== The New or Second Academy ==
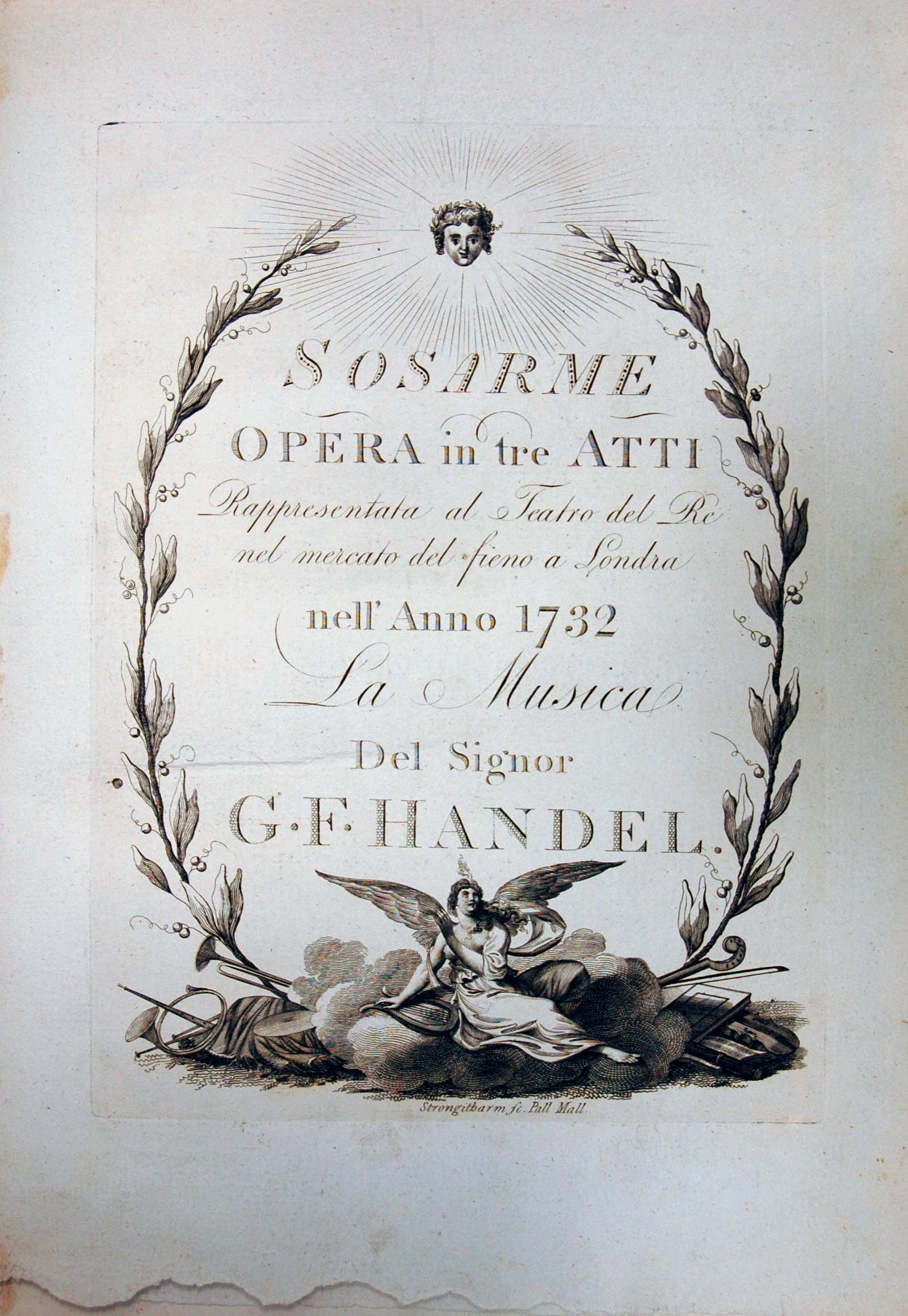
Sosarme, frontispiece to the score, 1732.

In 1729 Handel became joint manager of the King's Theatre with the Swiss aristocrat John James Heidegger. Handel travelled to Italy to engage seven new singers. In Bologna he met with Owen Swiny, a former theatre manager from London. Back home he composed seven more operas. On his way back he visited his mother and probably met with Wilhelm Friedemann Bach, sent by his father, as the story goes. Johann Sebastian Bach, working only 20 miles away in Köthen, arrived too late to meet with his famous colleague, who had left earlier that day. Back in London Handel produced Ezio, an expensive disaster. Charles Burney ranked the score of his next opera Sosarme among his most pleasing; Dean states the opera does more honour to Handel as a musician than as a dramatist. Handel composed Partenope, Poro, and Orlando, but with mixed success with the public. In the long run Handel failed to compete with the Opera of the Nobility, who had engaged musicians such as Johann Adolf Hasse, Nicolo Porpora and the famous castrato Farinelli.

Frederick, Prince of Wales and the anti-German faction of the English nobility who backed the Opera of Nobility sought to gain ground against the German court by attacking the foreigner Handel, little concerned about the paradox of the situation: the nationalistic faction fought with the weapon of the foreign Italian opera and summoned the aid of foreigners such as Hasse, himself an Italianized German like Handel.

Handel had composed about 30 operas for the Royal Academy. and moved his productions to Covent Garden. The Opera of the Nobility took over the King's Theatre.

The Academy survived until 1734, after which it encountered many difficulties: arguments between Handel and his singers, the dismissal of Paolo Rolli after quarrels with the directors, disagreement between the directors themselves, about the employment of new singers and squabbles on stage, but for all the Academy's problems, its success was enormous.

== See also ==
- Handel House Museum

== Sources ==
- Dean, W. & J.M. Knapp (1995) Handel's operas 1704–1726. Revised Edition. Oxford: Clarendon Press. ISBN 0-19-816441-6
- Dean, W. (2006) “Handel’s Operas, 1726–1741”, (The Boydell Press). Woodbridge. ISBN 1-84383-268-2
- Dean, W. (1993) "Handel's Sosarme, a Puzzle Opera". In: Essays on Opera. Oxford University Press. Oxford. ISBN 0-19-816384-3.
- Deutsch, O.E. (1955), Handel: A Documentary Biography. W.W. Norton & Company Inc Publishers. New York. Reprint 1974, Da Capo Press. ISBN 0-306-70624-5
- Bukofzer, M.F. (1948) Music in the Baroque Era. From Monteverdi to Bach. J.M. Dent & Sons Ltd. London, Toronto, Melbourne. Reprint 1983. ISBN 0-460-03431-6.
- Handel, A Celebration of his life and times, 1685–1759. Edited by Jacob Simon. Published by the National Portrait Gallery, London. ISBN 0-904017-68-0
