= Floridante =

1721 opera by Georg Friedrich Händel

George Frideric Handel

Floridante (HWV 14) is an opera seria in three acts by George Frideric Handel. The Italian-language libretto was by Paolo Antonio Rolli after Francesco Silvani's libretto for Marc'Antonio Ziani dramma per musica La costanza in trionfo of 1696.

The opera was first given at the King's Theatre in London on 9 December 1721 and was a success with audiences, being revived by Handel in several subsequent seasons. The plot involves dynastic struggles and love tangles in a fictionalised Ancient Persia and is notable for an exceptionally beautiful duet, "Ah, mia cara."

== Background ==
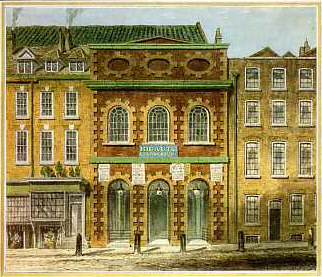
The King's Theatre, London, where Floridante had its first performance

The German-born Handel, after spending some of his early career composing operas and other pieces in Italy, settled in London, where in 1711 he had brought Italian opera for the first time with his opera Rinaldo. A tremendous success, Rinaldo created a craze in London for Italian opera seria, a form focused overwhelmingly on solo arias for the star virtuoso singers. In 1719, Handel was appointed music director of an organisation called the Royal Academy of Music (unconnected with the present day London conservatoire), a company under royal charter to produce Italian operas in London. Handel was not only to compose operas for the company but hire the star singers, supervise the orchestra and musicians, and adapt operas from Italy for London performance.

== Instrumentation ==
The instrumentation includes two oboes, two flutes, two trumpets in D, two horns in D, two bassoons, harpsichord and strings.

== Roles ==
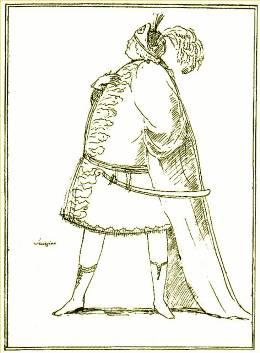
Caricature of Senesino, who created the role of Floridante

Rodrigo discography
Role	Voice type	Premiere Cast, 9 December 1721
Floridante, Prince of Thrace	alto castrato	Francesco Bernardi, called Senesino
Oronte, King of Persia	bass	Giuseppe Maria Boschi
Timante, Prince of Tyre	soprano castrato	Benedetto Baldassari
Rossane, Oronte's daughter	soprano	Maria Maddalena Salvai
Elmira	contralto	Anastasia Robinson
Coralbo, Persian satrap	bass	

== Synopsis ==
Scene: Persia, in antiquity.

Years before the action begins, Persian general Oronte had staged a coup, murdered the king, seized the throne himself and adopted the slain king's baby daughter, Elisa, bringing her up as his own daughter under the name Elmira by the side of his real daughter Rossane. Now the girls are of marriageable age, Elmira has been betrothed to Prince Floridante, a leader of Oronte's armies, and Rossane is to be married to a prince of a nearby kingdom, Timante, Prince of Tyre. However, Oronte has fallen in love with his adopted daughter himself and no longer wishes her to marry Floridante, and Tyre and Persia have gone to war, so Rossane's wedding to Timante (whom she has never met, the marriage having been arranged for reasons of diplomacy) is also looking unlikely.

=== Act 1 ===
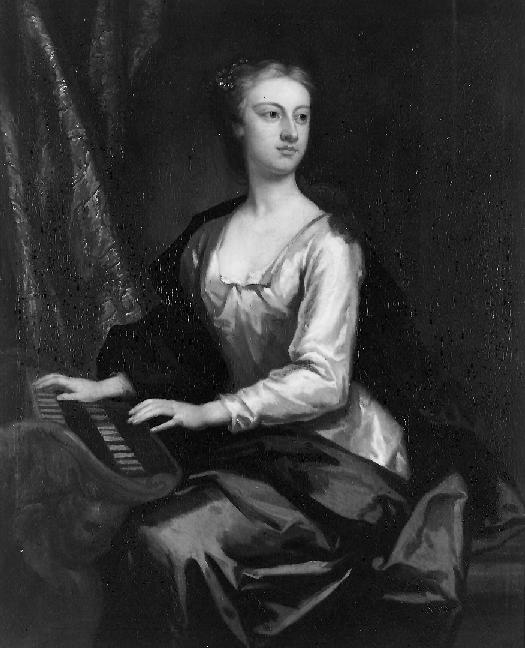
Anastasia Robinson, who created the role of Elmira

Floridante returns from battle, where he has just won a glorious victory over Tyre, and is greeted by the royal sisters (as they believe) Elmira and Rossane. Rossane, who has been upset because of the cancellation of her marriage to Timante, now at war with Persia, is presented by Floridante with a Tyrian captive from the battle, by name of Gilcore, who is actually none other than Timante in disguise. A letter from King Oronte is delivered to Floridante, which, much to the consternation of all assembled, orders him to leave the country immediately.

Rossane appeals to her father Oronte not to banish Floridante. Oronte agrees at least to see Floridante but says important state considerations now make his marriage to Elmira impossible. Rossane also has a discussion with "Gilcore" who tells her that Timante managed to escape from the battle unharmed and proclaimed that he would love her forever.

Floridante is brought before the king, who will not revoke his banishment despite Floridante's pleas or the tearful appeals of Elmira. Elmira and Floridante take a sad farewell of each other.

=== Act 2 ===
"Gilcore" assures Rossane that her betrothed, Timante, lives, and presents her with a portrait of him. She is overjoyed to recognise the picture as that of "Gilcore" himself.

Floridante has disguised himself as a Moor and plans to escape with Elmira, taking "Gilcore" and Rossane along with them, but before they can do that Oronte confronts Elmira and tells her that he wants to marry her himself, explaining that he is not really her father. She is nonetheless shocked and horrified by his suggestion and denounces him as monstrous.

The lovers are preparing to escape when Oronte catches them, sends Floridante to the dungeon and gives Elmira the choice of marrying him or being put to death.

=== Act 3 ===
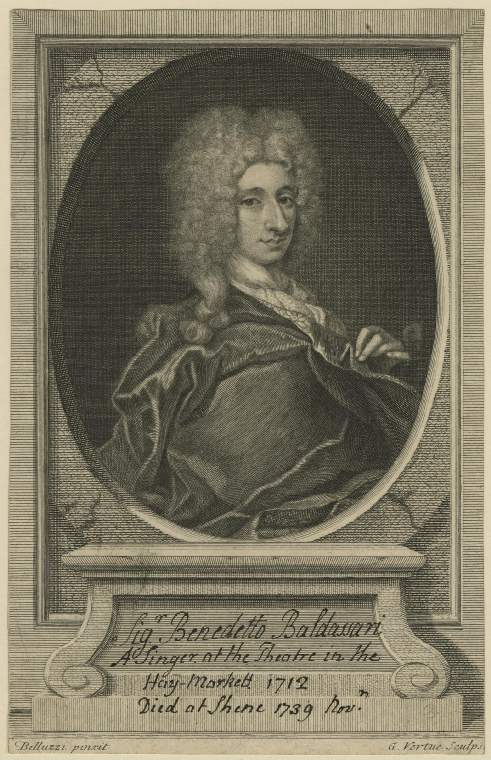
Benedetto Baldassari, who created the role of Timante

Rossane tells Elmira that even though they have now discovered they are not really sisters, as they had believed, she will always feel sisterly love for her. Oronte enters and tells Elmira that the "Moor" (Floridante) has died, at which she faints away. While she is unconscious, Oronte has Floridante brought to him in chains and tells him Elmira must either marry him or die. Oronte suggests Floridante save her life by advising her to marry him. Floridante attempts to do so when Elmira revives, but she insists she prefers to die by his side.

Rossana and Timante have decided to overthrow the cruel Oronte, who has ordered Elmira to bring a poisoned drink to Floridante in the dungeon. She does so, but is about to drink it herself rather than give it to him, when Oronte enters and dashes it from her hand. Timante and Rossane rush in, seize Oronte and announce that Elmira is rightful Queen of Persia.

The final scene takes place at the coronation celebrations of Elmira, now under her real name as Queen Elisa, with her beloved husband Floridante by her side. They swear to be faithful to each other and rule their empire justly. Rossane appeals to Elisa to pardon her father Oronte, which she does. Rossane and Timante will also wed and rule over Tyre.

== Musical features ==
Another composer who wrote operas for the Royal Academy of Music, Giovanni Bononcini, had had great success with his operas in the previous season and it is evident that in Floridante Handel has modified the style of his earlier Academy operas such as Radamisto to adopt a lighter and more straightforward melodic approach to compete with the other composer's popularity. Particularly notable in Floridante are two beautiful duets, one deeply tragic as Elmira and Floridante are forced to part at the end of the first act, the other light and amorous between the other pair of lovers, Rossane and Timante, in Act Two.

The opera is scored for two recorders, two oboes, two bassoons, two trumpets, two horns, strings and continuo (cello, lute, harpsichord).

== Reception and performance history ==
Handel had written the part of Elmira for soprano Margherita Durastanti, who had appeared in numerous of his other works, but she had been taken ill while on holiday in Italy and was unable to return to London for the premiere. Therefore, the directors of the Academy replaced her with Anastasia Robinson, who had a different vocal range to Durastanti, and Handel had to revise some of the music he had already composed. The opera was given fifteen performances that season, a mark of success at the time. A musical amateur who from 1715 made an effort to collect scores of all of Handel's music, Elizabeth Legh, wrote "Immortal!" over the music of the Act One duet in her copy of the score. Handel revived Floridante with revisions on 4 December 1722. It was performed in Hamburg in 1723 and revived in London with further revisions in 1727 and 1733. The next staging, and the first modern performance, took place at the Unicorn Theatre, Abingdon on 10 May 1962. As with all Baroque opera seria, the work went unperformed for many years, but with the revival of interest in Baroque music and historically informed musical performance since the 1960s, Floridante, like all Handel operas, receives performances at festivals and opera houses today. Among other performances, Floridante was produced by Cambridge Handel Opera in 1989 and at the Handel Festival, Halle in 2009.

The manuscript of the final chorus from the opera was discovered in the 1930s, and filled out the autograph manuscript in the Royal collection at the British Museum.

== Recordings ==
Floridante discography
Year	Cast Floridante, Elmira, Rossane, Oronte, Timante	Conductor, orchestra	Label
1990	Drew Minter, Annette Markert, Katalin Farkas, István Gáti, Mária Zádori,	Nicholas McGegan, Capella Savaria	Hungaroton «Antiqua» HCD 31304-06
1991	Catherine Robbin, Linda Maguire, Nancy Argenta, Mel Braun, Ingrid Attrot	Alan Curtis, Tafelmusik	CBC Records SMCD 5110
2005	Marjana Mijanovic, Joyce DiDonato, Sharon Rostorf-Zamir, Vito Priante, Roberta Invernizzi	Alan Curtis, Il Complesso Barocco	Archiv Production 477 6566
