= Ottone =

Opera by George Frideric Handel

George Frideric Handel

Ottone, re di Germania ("Otto, King of Germany", HWV 15) is an opera by George Frideric Handel, to an Italian–language libretto adapted by Nicola Francesco Haym from the libretto by Stefano Benedetto Pallavicino for Antonio Lotti's opera Teofane. It was the first new opera written for the Royal Academy of Music (1719)'s fourth season and had its first performance on 12 January 1723 at the King's Theatre, Haymarket in London. Handel had assembled a cast of operatic superstars for this season and the opera became an enormous success.

The story of the opera is a fictionalisation of some events in the lives of Adalbert of Italy, his mother Willa of Tuscany (called "Gismonda" in the opera), Otto II, and the Byzantine Princess Theophanu, who became the wife of Otto II in a state marriage intended to form an alliance between the Byzantine Empire and the Holy Roman Empire.

== Background ==
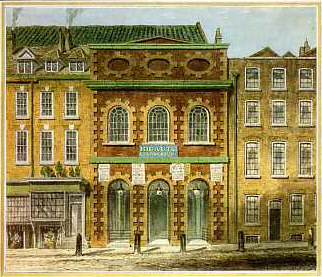
The King's Theatre, London, where Ottone had its first performance

The German-born Handel, after spending some of his early career composing operas and other pieces in Italy, settled in London, where in 1711 he had brought Italian opera for the first time with his opera Rinaldo. A tremendous success, Rinaldo created a craze in London for Italian opera seria, a form focused overwhelmingly on solo arias for the star virtuoso singers. In 1719, Handel was appointed music director of an organisation called the Royal Academy of Music (unconnected with the present day London conservatoire), a company under royal charter to produce Italian operas in London. Handel was not only to compose operas for the company but hire the star singers, supervise the orchestra and musicians, and adapt operas from Italy for London performance.

For the fourth season in 1723, for which his first opera was Ottone, Handel assembled a cast of star singers including the internationally famous castrato, Senesino, beginning a long and sometimes stormy association with Handel that included creating seventeen leading roles in his operas for London, at a vast salary. The star soprano Margherita Durastanti, who had sung in many of Handel's early works in Italy as well as his previous operas in London, joined the cast, as did English soprano Anastasia Robinson, who was unhappy about much of the music Handel had written for her to sing in Ottone, feeling that she could not portray, as he desired, scorn and anger, and appealed in a letter to one of the patrons of the Royal Academy to intervene with Handel to write gentler music for her to suit her abilities. Also in the cast was another internationally renowned castrato, Gaetano Berenstadt, in the first of three roles he created in Handel operas.

New to London for Ottone, in addition to Senesino, was celebrated Italian soprano Francesca Cuzzoni. She knew that Handel had written much of the music for the opera before he had hired her, and at the first rehearsal with the composer, indicated that she would like him to write a new entrance aria especially for her, to show her unique talents and make a good first impression with the London public. On being asked to replace the aria Falsa imagine with a new one, Handel, according to his first biographer John Mainwaring, flew into a rage:

Having one day some words with CUZZONI on her refusing to sing Falsa imagine in OTTONE; Oh! Madame, (said he), je sçais bien que Vous êtes une véritable Diablesse: mais je Vous ferai sçavoir, moi, que je suis Beelzebub le Chéf des Diables (I know that you are a very devil: but I must tell you, I am Beelzebub the Chief of the Devils).; With this he took her up by the waist, and, if she made any more words, swore that he would fling her out of the window.

Cuzzoni yielded and sang the aria Handel had written with enormous success, including it throughout her career in recitals and concerts.

Handel had seen Antonio Lotti's opera Teofane, to the same libretto as Ottone, at Opernhaus am Zwinger in Dresden in 1719 with three of the same singers in the same roles. With newly written music by Handel, Giuseppe Maria Boschi and Margherita Durastanti repeated their roles from the Lotti's Teofane in Handel's Ottone.

== Instrumentation ==
The instrumentation includes two oboes, two flutes, two bassoons, harpsichord, and strings.

== Roles ==
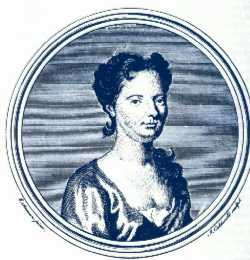
Francesca Cuzzoni, who created the role of Teofane

Roles, voice types, and premiere cast
Role	Voice type	Premiere Cast, 12 January 1723
Ottone, King of Germany, in love with Teofane	alto castrato	Senesino (Francesco Bernardi)
Teofane, daughter of the Byzantine Emperor	soprano	Francesca Cuzzoni
Emireno, a pirate, real name Basilio, brother of Teofane	bass	Giuseppe Maria Boschi
Gismonda, widow of Berengario, ruler of Italy	soprano	Margherita Durastanti
Adelberto, her son	alto castrato	Gaetano Berenstadt
Matilda, cousin of Ottone, betrothed to Adelberto	contralto	Anastasia Robinson

== Synopsis ==
Place: Rome and environs
Time: Around 970 AD

The opera is based on events from the lives of Adalbert of Italy and Otto II. The "Argument" to the opera provides the context of the events that precede the opera. It had been arranged that Ottone would marry Teofane, daughter of Romano, the Eastern Emperor. Basilio, Teofane's brother, had been driven into exile by a usurper. However, Basilio had become a pirate during his exile, and took on the name of Emireno.

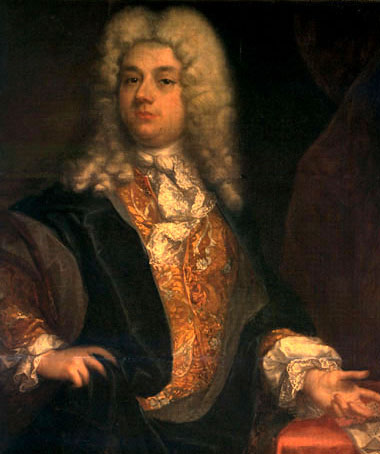
Senesino, who created the role of Ottone

=== Act 1 ===
A gallery adorned with statues

Gismonda's dream is to see her son Adelberto on the throne of Italy. (Arioso: Pur chi regni il figlio amato). When Adelberto comes to her, she informs him of her scheme to bring this to pass. Her deceased husband had ruled Italy illegally as the country was really a possession of the German King Ottone, who is now on the way to reclaim the territory and to marry Teofane, daughter of the Byzantine emperor, who is already in Rome and has been sent a portrait of her bridegroom-to-be, which has caused her to look forward to her marriage with delight. However Ottone has been delayed in his journey to Rome by an attack on his convoy of ships by pirates, necessitating a battle at sea. Gismonda instructs her son to present himself to Teofane as her bridegroom, and then marry her, pretending to be Ottone. Adelberto thinks this is a very clever plan and Gismonda joyfully anticipates her son's success. (Aria: La Speranza è Giunta in porto).

Teofane comes to meet, as she believes, her husband-to-be Ottone, and when Adelberto greets her, pretending to be Ottone, she cannot understand why he looks nothing like the handsome and noble young man she had imagined from the miniature portrait she had been sent and carries with her in a locket. Left alone, she accuses the portrait of cruelly misleading her (Aria: Falsa imagine).

Tents along the shore of the sea with ships at anchor

The true Ottone has arrived to claim his rightful kingdom and his bride, and has defeated the pirate Emireno, who is brought before him in chains. Emireno hints that he is really someone very mighty but refuses to reveal his true identity and is led away. (Aria: Del minacciar del vento). Ottone is now greeted by his enraged cousin Princess Matilda, who was officially engaged to Adelberto and is furious that he now proposes to marry Teofane instead. She informs Ottone that Gismonda and Adelberto are scheming against him. Ottone hopes that Teofane can still be his despite this (Aria: Ritorna, o dolce amore). Matilda, alone, yearns for revenge against Adelberto for his jilting of her (Aria: Diresti poi così).

Throne room of Gismonda's palace

Since her son Adelberto is now posing as Ottone, Gismonda poses as Ottone's mother Adelaide in a meeting with Teofane. "Adelaide" haughtily instructs Teofane to give her son her heart as well as her hand (Aria: Pensa ad amare), and leaves. Adelberto comes to lead Teofane to their wedding, but his mother reappears with the news that Ottone is invading with an army, thrusts a sword into her son's hand and sends him off to battle. Left alone, Teofane now realises that Adelberto is only pretending to be Ottone, and laments the position in which she finds herself (Aria: Affanni del pensier).

A battlefield

A sinfonia is played as an onstage battle shows the defeat of Adelberto's army and his capture by Ottone's forces. Adelberto is led away, defiant but in chains (Aria: Tu puoi straziarmi). Alone, Ottone is still hopeful of winning Teofane and the kingdom and ruling in peace, extending justice to all (Aria: Dell’onda ai fieri moti).

=== Act 2 ===
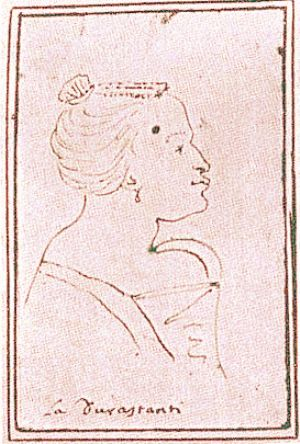
A caricature of Margherita Durastanti, who created the role of Gismonda

A brief orchestral sinfonia introduces the act.

A hallway in the palace

On his way to prison, Adelberto is encountered by Matilda, who tells him he should never have accepted being engaged to her if he really loved Teofane instead. They are joined by Gismonda, who reproaches her son for being defeated in battle by Ottone. Adelberto hopes that he will learn fidelity from Matilda's example, and is led away (Aria: Lascia, che nel suo viso). Matilda and Gismonda are both distraught at Adelberto's defeat and imprisonment. Matilda thinks they should beg Ottone for mercy, but Gismonda would prefer that she and her son both be put to death rather than thus abase themselves. Matilda says she will not allow that to happen, Adelberto must be freed (Aria: Ah! Tu non sai). When alone, Gismonda admits to herself that she too feels pity for her son and longs to console him in his distress (Aria: Vieni, o figlio, e mi consola).

Teofane and Ottone are about to meet face to face for the first time, both looking forward to this, but Matilda suddenly appears and throws herself at Ottone's feet, begging him for mercy for Adelberto. Teofane withdraws into an alcove and watches as Ottone declines to pardon Adelberto but embraces Matilda in an attempt to console her. Teofane misinterprets this gesture as a sign that Ottone is in love with Matilda. In any case, the embrace does nothing to cool Matilda; she fulminates against Ottone for his refusal to show clemency to Adelberto, calling on monsters and furies to pursue him (Aria: All’orror d’un duolo eterno). When Teofane and Ottone finally meet, she accuses him of falsely pretending he is not in love with another (Aria: Alla fama, dimmi il vero) and, once on his own, Ottone prays that this storm will subside (Aria: Dopo l’orrore).

A delightful garden by the Tiber with springs and caves, and an underground passage closed by a stone. Night

Teofane walks dejectedly in the garden, feeling utterly alone (Aria: S’io dir potessi). Emireno and Adelberto emerge from the tunnel, pushing the stone aside. They have escaped from prison with the help of a map sent to them by Matilda. Emireno looks forward to freedom and to vanquishing the enemies who have wronged him (Aria: Le profonde vie dell’onde). Emireno goes to find the boat Matilda has told him will be waiting, and Matilda herself, then Ottone arrive, Matilda looking for the tunnel and Ottone in search of Teofane. Adelberto and Teofane conceal themselves as Matilda guides Ottone away, telling him it is not safe for him to wander around at night alone. Ottone is more concerned about Teofane than himself (Aria: Deh! Non dir). Emireno has found the boat and returns, and Adelberto seizes Teofane, who swoons as he carries her into the boat and rows her away, together with Emireno and some of their men. Gismonda joins Matilda in the garden; they celebrate the night that saw the success of their plan to free Adelberto (Duet: Notte cara).

=== Act 3 ===
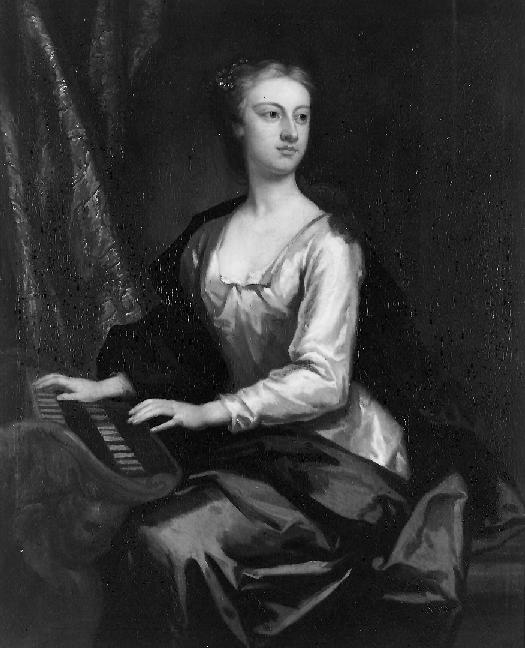
Anastasia Robinson, who created the role of Matilda

A room in the palace

Ottone is desolate that Teofane has vanished (Aria: Dove sei, dolce mia vita). Gismonda comes to him and gloats that her son has escaped (Aria: Trema, tiranno). Ottone feels betrayed and abandoned by everyone (Aria: Tanti affanni).

A wood with a view of the Tiber

After a brief orchestral sinfonia, Adelberto, Emireno and Teofane appear with their guards. Their escape has been stalled by a sudden squall that has blown up. Adelberto hopes both for better weather and for Teofane's love (Aria: D’innanlzar i flutti al ciel). He leaves to look for a dwelling where they can take refuge from the storm. Alone with Emireno, Teofane demands respect as the daughter of Romano, King of Byzantium. At this, Emireno attempts to embrace her, and Teofane, as well as Adelberto who returns just as this takes place, misinterpret the action as an attempt at seduction. Adelberto attacks Emireno but the guards seize him. Teofane is distraught and asks the guards to kill her, death will be a release (Aria: Benchè mi sia crudele). Emireno tells her she has no reason to be afraid (Aria: No, non temere, o bella). Teofane imagines Ottone in Matilda's arms, but even so, she swears she will love him always (Aria: Gode l’alma consolata).

A room in the palace

Matilda tells Ottone that Adelberto has abducted Teofane. Gismonda is triumphant at her son's actions, but Matilda tells her she will change her tune when she sees her son's head cut from his shoulders. Gismonda retorts by revealing to Ottone that it was due to Matilda that Adelberto managed to escape. Matilda admits this is true, but she is sorry she helped Adelberto and would now like to kill him herself (Aria: Nel suo sangue). Emireno comes in with Adelberto in chains. Ottone orders Adelberto to be executed, but Matilda demands the right to run him through herself. However she cannot bring herself to do it, realising that she still loves him. Gismonda grabs the knife from Matilda and is about to commit suicide, when Teofane rushes in and she and Ottone are joyfully reunited (Duet: A’ teneri affetti). Teofane explains that she now knows that Emireno is really her brother; Gismonda and Adelberto ask for and receive Ottone's forgiveness and pledge him their loyalty, and Matilda accepts Adelberto's offer of marriage. All celebrate the fortunate turn of events (Chorus: Faccia ritorno l’antica pace).

== Musical features ==
The arias in Ottone place less emphasis on bravura and dazzling virtuosity than in Handel's previous operas and are notable for expressive beauty. Many of the arias and instrumental movements from the piece became concert favourites, according to musical historian Charles Burney. The opera begins with a French overture in three sections, followed by a dance movement. This last section of the overture, according to Burney, became extremely popular all over England and was played on "every imaginable instrument". The aria for Senesino in the role of Ottone, Ritorna, o dolce amore, a siciliana in 12/8 time, is praised by musicologist Paul Henry Lang as "exquisitely turned...one of his most beguiling melodies". The three star roles for women singers are characterised by Handel with entirely different music. Teofane's music is pure and melting; her entrance aria Falsa imagine, with its "fine" cello obbligato is, according to Lang, one of Handel's greatest arias, and she too is given a "bewitching" siciliana to sing, the aria Affanni del pensier. The music for Matilda, as her mood swings wildly in the course of the action between hatred, anguish and love, is completely different in character from the "gentle and maidenly" music for Teofane. The scheming mother Gismonda is also characterised by Handel's music in the arias for her, bringing out the two sides of her nature - haughty and ruthlessly ambitious, as in the aria Giunt'in porto while at the same time feeling immense maternal love and devotion for her son (as for instance in the beautiful Vieni, o figlio.

The opera is scored for recorder, two oboes, two bassoons, strings and continuo (cello, lute, harpsichord).

== Reception and performance history ==
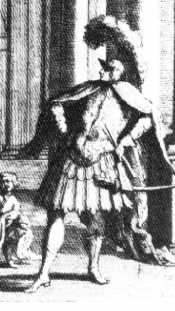
Caricature of Gaetano Berenstadt, who created the role of Adelberto

Handel had completed the first version of Ottone on 10 August 1722, but revised the opera before its first performance. The opera was a great success in Handel's lifetime, and received revivals in December 1723, 1726, 1727 and 1733, in some cases with additional music. After the first performances of the initial run, demand for tickets was so great that they were sold at much more than their face value, in an early example of ticket touting.

Not only the wealthy and aristocratic patrons of the opera were enthusiastic about the performance and the singers: their servants who were in attendance on them were allowed free admission to the gallery and such was their enthusiasm during the opera that a notice was inserted in the London press, as printed in the Daily Courant on 26 January 1723:

Upon Complaint to the Royal Academy of Musick, that Disorders have been of late committed in the Footmen's Gallery, to the Interruption of the Performance; This is to give Notice, That the next Time any Disorder is made there, that Gallery will be shut up.

18th century musicologist Charles Burney noted that "the number of songs in this opera that became national favourites was perhaps greater than in any other that was ever performed in England" and "the slow air Falsa imagine, (which Cuzzoni had at first not wished to perform), "the first which Cuzzoni sung in this country, fixed her reputation as an expressive and pathetic singer." John Gay complained in a letter to his friend Jonathan Swift that such was the craze for Italian opera created by Ottone that no one in London was interested in any other form of art or literature:

As for the reigning amusements of the town, it is entirely music...there is nobody allowed to say "I sing" but an eunuch or an Italian woman. Everybody is grown now as great a judge of music as they were in your time of poetry, and folks that could not distinguish one tune from another now daily dispute about the different styles of Handel [and other composers]. People have now forgot Homer, and Virgil, and Caesar, or at least, they have lost their ranks;for, in London and Westminster, in all polite conversations, Senesino is daily voted to be the greatest man that ever lived.

Ottone also is notable as the only Handel opera in which Farinelli appeared, in the role of Adelberto, in December 1734. In Germany, Ottone was staged in Brunswick (Braunschweig) and Hamburg in the 1720s. The next production in Germany, on 5 July 1921 in Göttingen, was the first revival of any Handel opera in the twentieth century. In the UK, the next production after 1734 was given by the Handel Opera Society on 19 October 1971 at Sadler's Wells Theatre. With the revival of interest in Baroque music and historically informed musical performance since the 1960s, Ottone, like all Handel operas, receives performances at festivals and opera houses today. Among other productions, Ottone was performed by the King's Consort at the Theater an der Wien in 2010. English Touring Opera presented the opera in London and toured to parts of the UK in the autumn of 2014, and the work was performed at the Festival de Beaune in 2017.

== Recordings ==
Rodrigo discography
date	Cast: Ottone, Teofane, Gismonda, Adelberto, Emireno, Matilda	Conductor, orchestra	Label
1992, studio: Stadthalle, Göttingen, June 9–12	Drew Minter, Lisa Saffer, Juliana Gondek, Ralf Popken, Michael Dean, Patricia Spence	Nicholas McGegan, Freiburger Barockorchester	CD: Harmonia Mundi, Cat: HMU907073.75
1993, studio: St Jude-on-the-Hill, Hampstead, Jan 27 to Feb 3	James Bowman, Claron Mcfadden, Jennifer Smith, Dominique Visse, Michael George, Catherine Denley	Robert King, The King's Consort	CD:Hyperion, Cat: CDS44511/3
2016, studio: Villa San Fermo, Lonigo, June 22 to July 2	Max Emanuel Cenčić, Lauren Snouffer, Ann Hallenberg, Xavier Sabata, Pavel Kudinov, Anna Starushkevych	George Petrou, Il Pomo d'Oro	CD: Decca Classics, Cat: 483 1814
