= Anastasia Robinson =

18th-century English singer (died 1755)

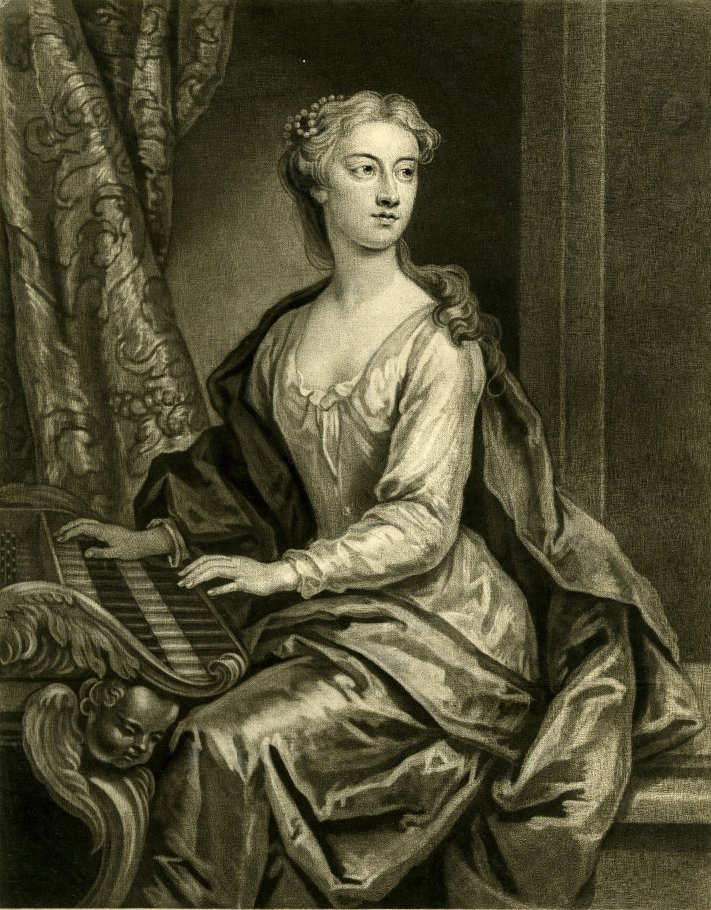
Anastasia Robinson seated at the harpsichord, proof for 1727 mezzotint by John Faber the Younger after 1723 painting by John Vanderbank, British Museum

Anastasia Robinson (c. 1692 – April 1755), later known as Anastasia, Countess of Peterborough, was an English soprano, later contralto, of the Baroque era. As a performer, she is best remembered for her association with the composer George Frideric Handel, in whose operas she sang. (Note: Note that Robinson is not to be confused with Ann Turner Robinson, another English soprano who was active during the same period, and who also sang for Handel. Though Turner Robinson was normally referred to as "Mrs Turner Robinson" in accounts of the time, it is not always easy to distinguish the two.) She created roles in the world premieres of several of Handel's operas, including Zenobia in Radamisto (1720), Irene in Muzio Scevola (1721), Elmira in Floridante (1721), Matilda in Ottone (1723), Teodata in Flavio (1723), and Cornelia in Giulio Cesare (1724).

Robinson's late career was overshadowed by a scandal in February 1724 involving the Italian castrato Senesino and Charles Mordaunt, 3rd Earl of Peterborough. Having secretly married the Earl in c. 1722–1723, Robinson was widely believed to be the Earl's mistress at the time of the scandal when she was in fact his wife. The scandal involved an altercation between Robinson and Senesino in which she accused the castrato of being too sexual in his acting towards her in their scenes together, and a subsequent altercation between the Earl and Senesino in which he defended the singer's honour. This event became the subject of gossip among the English public after the event was written about by the satirist Jonathan Swift. Swift's writing inspired a number of widely circulated misogynistic, sexually provocative and subversive epistles written about Robinson, Senesino, the Earl, and the castrato Farinelli between 1724 and 1736. These epistles have become the subject of study in the field of Restoration literature.

== Early life and initial career ==
Robinson was the eldest daughter of Thomas Robinson, a portrait painter who worked for a time in Italy (where she is thought to have been born). Initially her musical talent was privately trained, and her first performances were at private society concerts at Golden Square, where her father owned a property. At these concerts she both sang and accompanied herself on the harpsichord. In the early 1710s her father's eyesight began to fail and Robinson, forced to earn a living for herself and her family, turned professional.

== Professional career ==
Her association with Handel can be dated to 1714, when he wrote the solo soprano role in the Ode for the Birthday of Queen Anne for her. She joined his company early that year, making her debut in Creso, a pasticcio. As the year went on she sang in revivals of Arminio and Ernelinda (both pasticcios, possibly with music by Nicola Haym); on several occasions new music was written for her. London audiences clearly gave her a good reception, and her career continued to prosper; she played the role of Almirena in a 1715 revival of Rinaldo, and originated the role of Oriana in Handel's Amadigi. In a 1717 revival of this opera Handel created a new scene for her and Nicolini, the brilliant castrato who had earlier originated the title role in Rinaldo. The retired soprano Joanna Maria Lindehleim was one of her teachers at some point. Around 1719 it seems that an illness caused her voice to drop from that of a soprano to that of a contralto. Upon the formation of Handel's Royal Academy of Music in 1719, Robinson was engaged on a yearly salary of £1000 and originated many new roles, most notably Zenobia (Radamisto), Irene (Muzio Scevola), Elmira (Floridante), Matilda (Ottone), Teodata (Flavio) and, most famously of all, the pathos-filled role of Cornelia in Giulio Cesare. She also sang in works by Bononcini and Ariosti, as well as a number of pasticcios. Soon after the premiere of Giulio Cesare in February 1724 she retired from the stage. In 1722 (or possibly 1723) she had secretly married Charles Mordaunt, 3rd Earl of Peterborough, although he did not acknowledge her status as his wife until 1735, just before his death; until then they lived separately, and society regarded her as his mistress. Robinson seems to have come out of retirement in some capacity by 1745 as evidenced by her originating the role of Dejanira in Handel's Hercules.

== Personal life, scandal, and life in retirement ==
In 1722 (or possibly 1723) Anastasia Robinson secretly married Charles Mordaunt, 3rd Earl of Peterborough, although he did not acknowledge her status as his wife until 1735, just before his death; until then they lived separately, and society regarded her as his mistress.

Robinson's career was marked by scandal involving an altercation with the Italian castrato Senesino in February 1724 in which Robinson complained Senesino's acting had become too sexually forward. Her honor was defended by her husband, the Earl of Peterborough, but the fact that the marriage was secret subjected Robinson to scandal. Robinson, Senesino, and the Earl became topical fodder for the Irish satirist Jonathan Swift who widely circulated the story beyond that city. The English public, unaware of the Earl and Robinson's marriage, gossiped widely on the hypocrisy of a woman who was a mistress complaining of sexual impropriety on the opera stage.

Swift's writing in turn inspired the creation of a number of obscene, misogynistic, and at times sexually subversive epistles written about Robinson, Senesino, the Earl of Peterborough, and the castrato Farinelli between 1724 and 1736. These satyrical epistles were penned by anonymous authors, and were written from the perspective of one of the individuals involved in the scandal. The first of these was An Epistle from Senesino to Anastasia Robinson which was dated 17 February 1724. Soon after, the dramatist Aaron Hill in his literary periodical The Plain Dealer published a response to this letter entitled An Answer from Mrs. Robinson. Thus began a chain of literary epistles that extended over a twelve-year period. These epistles have become a subject of study by scholars of Restoration literature.

After Robinson's retirement she lived in Parsons Green, supported by Peterborough and her earnings from the opera. She did not detach herself from the musical world; she retained a close friendship with Bononcini, who had taught her in the past, and her house became a sort of academy-in-miniature at which Bononcini, Pier Francesco Tosi, and other musicians of the day frequently performed. For Bononcini she obtained a pension of £500 per annum from the Duchess of Marlborough. A Roman Catholic, she was also a friend of the poet Alexander Pope. After Peterborough's death in 1735, she lived at his family residence near Southampton. Lady Peterborough died in Bath, and her remains were interred in Bath Abbey.

== Reputation ==
As a singer Robinson was noted for sweetness of tone, expressiveness and charisma rather than any particular virtuosic gifts. Handel was careful to use the orchestra to support the music he wrote for her, but the dramatic demands of her roles in Giulio Cesare and Flavio suggest that she possessed a not inconsiderable talent as an actress. De Fabrice, a Hanoverian diplomat visiting London in the early 1720s, compared her favourably to the extraordinary Margherita Durastanti (Sesto to Robinson's Cornelia in Cesare). Part of her correspondence is preserved for posterity in the Campori collection at Modena, and these, in addition to her personal popularity in society, suggest an attractive character.

== See also ==
- List of entertainers who married titled Britons

== Bibliography ==
- "Robinson, Anastasia" . Dictionary of National Biography. London: Smith, Elder & Co. 1885–1900.
