= Santa Stella =

Italian soprano

Santa Stella (c. 1686 – 18 September 1759) was an Italian soprano. She was also known as Santa Stella Scarabelli and after her marriage to Antonio Lotti on 12 February 1714 as Santa Lotti or La Santini.

== Life ==
=== Early career ===
Her birthplace and origins are unknown, but her stage debut as Santa Stella was as Silene in Antonio Caldara's opera Gli equivoci del sembiante, which opened the 1703 carnival season at the Teatro Nuovo in Casale Monferrato. In 1704 she took the lead role in the premiere of Il gran Pompeo (an opera by an unknown composer) at the same theatre. She sang in Genoa in 1705 and in various productions at Venice's Teatro San Giovanni Grisostomo and Teatro San Cassiano between 1706 and 1708, almost always taking the lead role or primadonna part. From 1706 to 1714 she also appeared as a singer for the camera del duca di Mantova in La Partenope by Antonio Caldara. In 1707 she also appeared in that work at Venice's Teatro San Giovanni Grisostomo. No sources survive to show she sang between her marriage and 1717, when she performed in Semiramide by Pollarolo.

=== Dresden ===
In 1717 she and her husband moved to Dresden, probably both recruited by the Elector of Saxony, the future Augustus III, who wished to found an Italian opera house in Dresden. They each received a payment of 9975 thalers, the same amount as was later paid to primadonna Faustina Bordoni and her husband Johann Adolf Hasse as musical director of the electoral court in Saxony.

Her Dresden debut was as Iside in her husband's Giove in Argo on 25 October 1717. Two years later, on 3 September 1719, she sang in the 'Festival of the planets' mounted to celebrate Augustus' marriage to Maria Josepha, daughter of Joseph I, Holy Roman Emperor. The Archduchess of Austria and the Princess of Hungary and Bohemia both attended the new purpose-built opera house. A year later she performed Silvia in Ascanio ovvero Gl'odi delusi dal sangue (premiered in February 1718 in Dresden in the Redoutensaal). The peak of Santa Stella's career was in the title role of her husband's Teofane, premiered on 13 September 1719 as one of the main musical attractions of the Festival of the Planets, during which she also reprised roles in the two earlier works Giove in Argo (3 September 1719) and Ascanio ovvero Gl'odi delusi dal sangue (7 September 1719).

The end of the 'Festival of the Planets' also marked the end of Italian opera at the electoral court in Saxony. Stella and her husband's contracts were not renewed and in October 1719 they left Dresden, receiving 160 ducats as travel expenses for the trip back to Venice. Most of the other singers in Dresden were recruited by Georg Friedrich Händel for his second London opera season, including the castrato Senesino, the soprano Margherita Durastanti, the alto Vittoria Tesi and the bass Giuseppe Maria Boschi (who had sung in Handel's Agrippina in Italian in 1709).

=== Post-Dresden ===
Stella's career after 1719 remain unclear. She may be identifiable with an artiste named 'Santa Santini' who performed in La costanza nel trionfo ovvero l'Irene by Francesco Peli in 1737 in Munich and in Ciro riconosciuto by Leonardo Leo in Turin in 1739.

== Selected roles (1705-1714) ==
From 1705 to 1714 she sang in several works by Tomaso Albinoni, Carlo Francesco Pollarolo and her husband Antonio Lotti.

=== Albinoni ===
- Elisa in Astarto (November 1708, Teatro San Cassiano)
- Engelberta in Engelberta (January 1709, Venice, Teatro San Cassiano)
- Emilia in Il tiranno eroe (December 1710, Venice, Teatro San Cassiano)

=== Pollarolo ===
- Igene in Igene, regina di Sparta (May 1708, Vicenza, Teatro nuovo di Piazza)
- Lavinia in Il falso Tiberino (January 1709, Venice, Teatro San Cassiano)
- Anagilda in Publio Cornelio Scipione (January 1712, Venice, Teatro San Giovanni Grisostomo )
- Semiramide in Semiramidi (January 1714, Venice, Teatro San Giovanni Grisostomo )

=== Lotti ===
- Argene in Sidonio (Pietro Pariati), 'dramma per musica' in 5 acts (20 November 1706, Venice, Teatro San Cassiano)
- Elena in Achille placato (Urbano Rizzi), 'tragedia per musica' in 5 acts (5 February 1707, Venice, Teatro San Cassiano)
- Zoe in La forza del sangue (Francesco Silvani), dramma per musica in 3 atti (14 November 1711, Venice, Teatro San Giovanni Grisostomo )
- Irene in Irene augusta (Francsco Silvani), 'dramma per musica' in 3 acts (22 November 1713, Venice, Teatro San Giovanni Grisostomo )

== Analysis ==
She was praised by her contemporaries as one of the most-important and best-known lyrical singers of her time, as shown by her inclusion under the sub-heading Opera in Allgemeine Theorie der schönen Künstedi by Johann Georg Sulzer.

A long analysis and description of her speaking and singing voice is to be found in the curriculum vitae by Johann Joachim Quantz as part of the "historical-critical contribution to the registration of music" by Friedrich Wilhelm Marpurg. The castrato Pier Francesco Tosi wrote in his Opinioni de' cantori antichi e moderni that "with a penetrating Sweetness of Voice, [Santa Stella had] gained the Hearts of all her Hearers".
