= Muzio Scevola =

1721 opera by Amadei, Bononcini and Handel

George Frideric Handel

Muzio Scevola (Italian pronunciation: [ˈmuttsjo ʃˈʃɛːvola]; HWV 13) is an opera seria in three acts about Gaius Mucius Scaevola. The Italian-language libretto was by Paolo Antonio Rolli, adapted from a text by Silvio Stampiglia. The music for the first act was composed by Filippo Amadei (sometimes given as Mattei), the second act by Giovanni Bononcini, and the third by George Frideric Handel. Collaborations of groups of composers were common in the 18th century, though this is the only one done in London. Bononcini had written the music for two earlier treatments of this story on his own, works dating from 1695 and 1710.

== Performance history ==
The opera's initial run of performances began at the King's Theatre in London on 15 April 1721. Handel revived the work on 7 November 1722 when it received a further five performances. It was also performed in Hamburg. The first modern performance was in Essen in 1928. The work receives occasional concert performances and stagings today. Among other performances, it featured in the Lucerne Festival of 2008.

== Roles ==
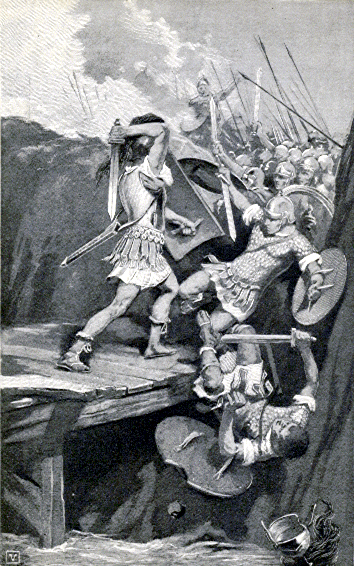
Horatius (called "Orazio" in the opera) at the Bridge

Rodrigo discography
Role	Voice type	Premiere Cast, 15 April 1721 (Conductor:)
Fidalma	soprano	Maria Maddalena Salvai
Clelia (Cloelia)	soprano	Margherita Durastanti
Tarquinio (Lucius Tarquinius)	soprano (en travesti)	Caterina Galerati
Irene, daughter of Porsena	contralto	Anastasia Robinson
Orazio (Horatius Cocles)	soprano castrato	Matteo Berselli
Muzio Scevola	alto castrato	Francesco Bernardi "Senesino"
Porsena, King of Etruria	bass	Giuseppe Maria Boschi

== Synopsis ==
- Scene: Rome, about 509 B.C.

=== Act 1 ===
The tyrant Tarquinio has recently been deposed from the throne of Rome for his many abuses of power and has allied with King Porsena of the neighbouring kingdom of Etruria. Together they have marched on Rome with their armies and are attacking the city to restore Tarquinio as King of Rome. The good natured and trusting King Porsena has been duped by Tarquinio and does not see with what a scoundrel he has allied himself- indeed, Porsena has even promised his daughter, Princess Irene, in marriage to Tarquinio. Irene has no interest in marrying Tarquino however as she is secretly in love with young Roman army officer Oratio, and he with her, and Irene advises Oratio to fight against her father and Tarquinio and try to stop the despot being restored to the throne.

At the Sublican Bridge in Rome, Oratio single-handedly fights off far higher numbers of invading Etruscans and then, wounded, and seeing his efforts failing, sets fire to the bridge, leaps into the Tiber and swims ashore, saving Rome and earning acclaim as a hero.

=== Act 2 ===
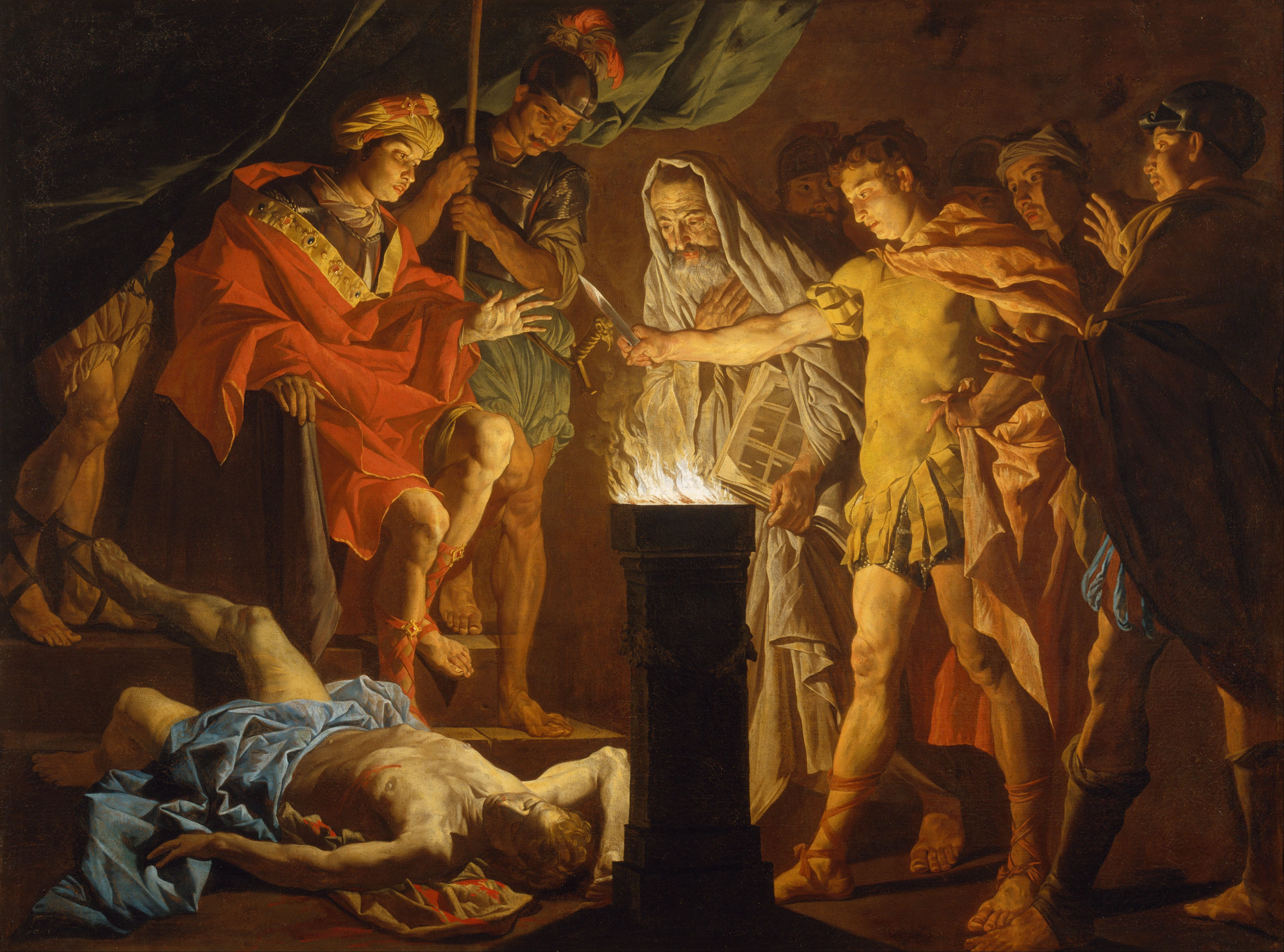
Mucius Scaevola in the Presence of Lars Porsenna by Matthias Stom, (early 1640s), Art Gallery of New South Wales

The young Roman soldier Muzio is anxious to prove that he too is brave enough to risk his safety for his country. His sweetheart is Clelia, beautiful and equally valorous in the service of her country. Muzio disguises himself as an Etruscan and steals into the enemy camp, determined to assassinate King Porsena. When the King appears on a platform with other dignitaries to make a speech to his troops, Muzio does not recognise the King and kills the wrong person. Porsena has him arrested and interrogates him. Muzio proudly proclaims that he is as ready to die as he was to kill and bodily pain means nothing to him. To demonstrate this, he thrusts his right hand into the fire on a sacrificial altar and holds it there, earning the last name "Scevola" (left-handed) for himself and his descendants. Porsena is so impressed with the young man's courage that he releases him without penalty.

Clelia is not content to leave all the fighting to the men but leads troops into battle herself. Porsena takes her captive and is smitten by her beauty and fighting spirit.

=== Act 3 ===
Porsena offers to sign a truce with Rome if his lovely captive Clelia will be his new queen. She hesitates but rejects him and manages to escape his camp, fling herself into the Tiber, and swim across the river to safety.

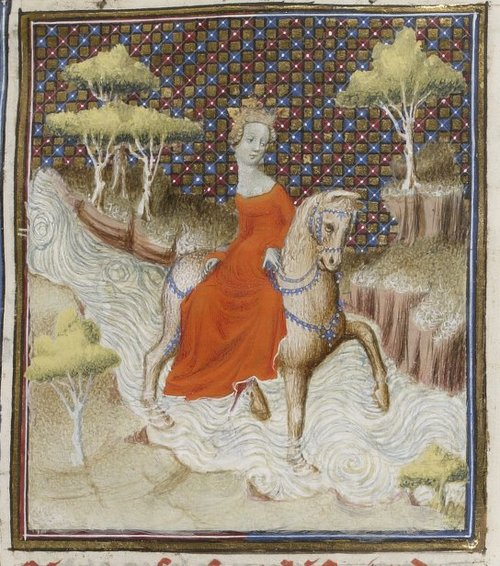
Cloelia crossing the Tiber, 15th century French illuminated manuscript

Tarquinio is defeated in battle by Oratio.

Porsena is at first furious at Clelia's escape, but when he finally learns the truth about what a villain Tarquinio is, he decides to sign a truce with Rome. At the Capitol, Porsena recognises that Muzio and Clelia truly love each other and renounces her so they may marry. His daughter Irene will marry the man of her heart also, the hero Oratio, whom Porsena names as his heir. All celebrate the fortunate outcome of events.

== Context and analysis ==
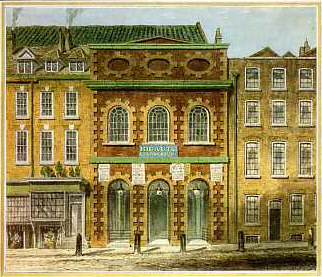
The King's Theatre, London, where Muzio Scevola had its first performance

The German-born Handel, after spending some of his early career composing operas and other pieces in Italy, settled in London, where in 1711 he had brought Italian opera for the first time with his opera Rinaldo. A tremendous success, Rinaldo created a craze in London for Italian opera seria, a form focused overwhelmingly on solo arias for the star virtuoso singers. In 1719, Handel was appointed music director of an organisation called the Royal Academy of Music (unconnected with the present day London conservatoire), a company under royal charter to produce Italian operas in London. Handel was not only to compose operas for the company but hire the star singers, supervise the orchestra and musicians, and adapt operas from Italy for London performance.

But Handel was not the only composer to write operas for the Academy. The Italian composer Giovanni Bononcini had also been resident in London and composing operas for the Academy since 1719 and some music lovers preferred his lighter, more Italianate style with straightforward melodies to Handel's more weighty music. The rivalry between those who supported one of the composers more than the other inspired a satirical ditty from John Byrom:

Some say, compared to Bononcini
That meinherr Handel's but a ninny.
Others aver that he to Handel
Is scarcely fit to hold a candle.
Strange all this difference should be
Twixt Tweedledum and Tweedledee!

To capitalise on this rivalry, according to Handel's first biographer John Mainwaring, which was not between the composers themselves but their "fans", the Academy decided to have both of them write an act each of an opera, with the third Academy composer Filippo Amadei composing the first act. Such collaborative efforts in opera composition were quite usual in Italy at the time, but Muzio Scevola was unique in England in being composed in that way. Handel was generally considered to have "won" this "competition" with most audience members rating his music far more highly than the others.

Handel's Act Three is scored for two oboes, bassoon, two trumpets, two horns, strings and continuo instruments. (cello, lute, harpsichord).

== Recordings ==
- Newport Classic NPD 85540/260125, recorded 1991: D'Anna Fortunato (Muzio), Julianne Baird (Clelia), John Ostendorf (Porsena), Jennifer Lane (Irene), Andrea Matthews (Fidalma), Erie Mills (Orazio), Frederick Urrey (Tarquinio) Brewer Baroque Chamber Orchestra; conductor Rudolph Palmer (excerpts).
