= Ann Turner Robinson =

Ann Turner Robinson (née Turner; died 5 January 1741, London) was an English soprano of the 18th century.

== Life ==
She was the youngest daughter of William Turner, a composer and countertenor who was a contemporary of Henry Purcell, and is best remembered for her association with the composer George Frideric Handel, in whose operas she sang.

On 6 September 1716 she married the organist John Robinson. They had a daughter who had a singing career, and other children who died young.

Her first public performances were in 1718: in the April of that year she sang a cantata by Ariosti at the King's Theatre, and the year after she performed in a private concert, accompanied by Handel, as a replacement for Jane Barbier. The librettist John Hughes commented at the time that

her late improvement has I think plac'd her in the first Rank of our English Performers.

Evidently the concert did nothing to harm Handel's opinion of her, for in 1720 she performed (alongside Anastasia Robinson, with whom she is often confused) in the first season of the Royal Academy, where she performed in Porta's Numitore, Domenico Scarlatti's Narciso, and, most famously, created the role of Polissena in Handel's Radamisto, a role that shows Handel's confidence in her abilities: the role calls for a range of e' to a'' and for some virtuosic excellence at a high tessitura.

It is likely that Turner Robinson was the "Mrs Robinson" who would regularly sing between the acts in the dramas at Drury Lane (late 1725 to late 1726), and who performed seven of Handel's operatic arias in her benefit on 28 April 1726. In a later benefit in March 1729 she included no fewer than 14 of Handel's works (the majority of which had been originally composed for Faustina Bordoni or Francesca Cuzzoni). In 1732 she sang in the first London performances of Handel's oratorios, as an Israelite woman in Esther.
