= Anthony L'Abbé =

French-born English Dancing Master

Anthony L'Abbé (born c. 1667 - died 1753 or later), sometimes written as L'abbé, was a dancer, dance composer, and dancing master who spent the best part of his career in England.

== Biography ==
It is believed that Anthony L'Abbé was born in Paris in 1667; although it is possible he was born in 1666. Details of his parentage are unknown. He began dancing at the Paris Opera (then known as the Académie royale de musique) in 1688. He was 21 years old when he was appointed to this position.

In 1698 L'Abbé was brought to London by the English theatre manager Thomas Betterton who put him to work at Lincoln's Inn Fields Theatre. Early on in his time England he danced the virtuosic duet to a Loure, taken from Acis et Galatée, act II, #6, that he composed and performed before William III together with his dance partner Claude Balon. He worked for Betterton as a dancer in his theaters until June 1703 after which he was active as a dancer in subscription concerts.

In December 1704 he was contracted by the dramatist John Vanbrugh as a dancer at the Queen's Theatre in the Haymarket, and in the years following was a featured dancers in the English court at a series of birthday celebrations given for Anne, Queen of Great Britain. He worked as a dancer and choreographer in a variety of London theatres through 1714. He became the dancing master to the 3 daughters of George II, and he composed and published an annual series of ball dances for George I's birthday starting in 1715 with The Princess Royal, dedicated to Princess Anne, the eldest daughter. His salary as their dancing master was higher than that of their music teacher, the composer George Frideric Handel.

In 1719 he collaborated with Handel on the establishment of the Royal Academy of Music opera company, and was involved with the composer in the staging of operas in 1719-1720. Around 1725 A New Collection of Dances was published containing 13 theatrical solos and duets, composed by L'abbé, which were performed by a number of the leading dancers in England between the time of William III, as mentioned above, to at least 1721. These dances were published using Beauchamp-Feuillet notation. Collectively there are 27 known notated dances composed by him in the course of his career, thus ranking him among the most prolific dance composers of the early 18th century.

In 1738 L'Abbé left England and returned to Paris. His address in Paris is known for the years 1750 to 1753 while he was in his 80s. After this he disappears from the record. It is unclear when and how he died.
