= John Robinson (organist) =

English composer and organist

John Robinson (1682 – 30 April 1762) was an English composer and organist; for many years organist of Westminster Abbey.

== Early life and career ==
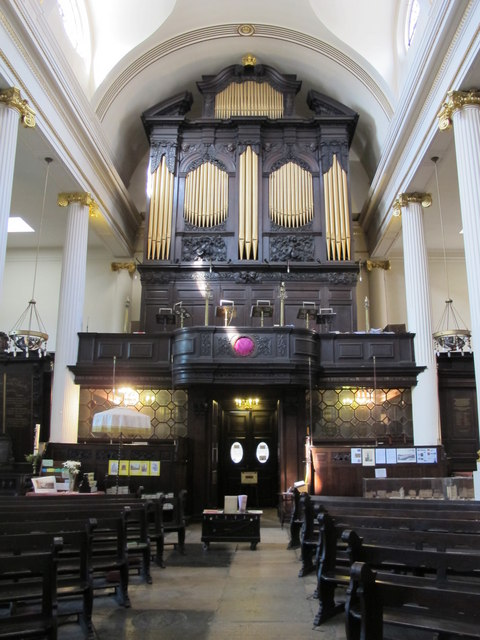
The organ of St Magnus, London Bridge

Robinson was born in 1682; in 1700 he was a chorister of the Chapel Royal, under John Blow. In 1710 he was appointed organist at St Lawrence Jewry in London, and in 1713 he became organist at St Magnus, London Bridge. The organ there, built in 1712, was the first in England to have a swell box, and in February 1712 it was first played in public by Robinson.

On 20 September 1727, after many years as assistant to William Croft, he became organist of Westminster Abbey, remaining in the post until his death. Benjamin Cooke became his assistant in 1746. Robinson was also a teacher of the harpsichord. As a composer, there has survived the double chant in E flat at the end of volume 1 of Boyce's Cathedral Music.

John Hawkins, in his book A General History of the Science and Practice of Music, wrote that Robinson had a florid style of playing the organ, which was popular with audiences; it was "calculated to display the agility of his fingers in allegro movements" rather than displaying "the full and noble harmony" of the organ.

He left a few organ compositions; among them two-part Voluntaries are the most common.

== Personal life ==
On 6 September 1716 he married Ann, daughter of the composer William Turner; she had a singing career. They had a daughter who became a singer, and other children who died young. After Ann's death in 1741 he married Mary, and they had a son, John Daniel.

Robinson died on 30 April 1762, aged 80, and was buried on 13 May in the north choir aisle of Westminster Abbey. John Blow and William Croft are buried nearby.

Cultural offices
Preceded by William Croft	Organist and Master of the Choristers of Westminster Abbey; 1727–1762	Succeeded by Benjamin Cooke
