= Filippo Amadei =

Italian composer

Filippo Amadei, also known as Pippo del Violoncello (fl. 1690–1730) was an Italian composer from Reggio Emilia, who was active in Rome and London.

He appears to have worked as composer of cantatas, oratorios, and as a cellist for Cardinal Ottoboni from 1690 to 1711, the year of his oratorio Teodosio il giovane (1711), then again from 1723 to 1729.

From 1719 to 1722, he was in London, where he wrote the first act of the opera Muzio Scevola (1721), with the second act by Giovanni Bononcini and the third by George Frideric Handel.

== Works ==
Oratorio:

- Teodosio il giovane Rome, 1711 on the story of Byzantine emperor Theodosius II (401–450)

Operas

- Arsace London, Royal Academy of Music, 1st Feb. 1721.
- Muzio Scevola Act 1, London, Royal Academy of Music, 15 April 1721.

== Recordings ==
- Muzio Scevola. Palmer.
- Handel's Rivals
