= Lisa Saffer =

American opera singer and teacher

- Born: June 3, 1960 (age 65)
- Known for: soprano; opera singer

Lisa Saffer (born June 3, 1960) is a soprano singer of opera, particularly Bach, Handel and modern works. She also teaches voice at the New England Conservatory.

== Early life and education ==
Saffer originates from Madison, Wisconsin, USA. She was awarded a bachelor's degree from Oberlin Conservatory of Music and a Master of Music, with Artist Diploma from the New England Conservatory.

== Voice ==
Saffer is a soprano. Her voice has been described as "Her silvery, brainy vocalism was world-class throughout and in the last celebratory aria, she brought the house down, rocketing off coloratura with flourish and showing off a splendid high C." (The Boston Globe, when she performed Cleopatra in Handel's Giulio Cesare).

== Career ==
Her career has led to acclaim for her interpretation of contemporary scores and as well as Bach, Handel and other baroque music. She has performed in the US and worldwide. Notable performances of modern works have been with the Royal Philharmonic (2002) and English National Opera (2005) as Lulu in Berg's eponymous opera, recorded in 2005 and the role of Marie in Zimmermann's Die Soldaten with the English National Opera, Opéra Bastille and New York City Opera. Her performances of classical works have included Handel's Messiah with the Philadelphia Orchestra, and Mendelssohn's A Midsummer Night's Dream with the New York Philharmonic.

Her performances have been recorded by several organisations including Harmonia Mundi, Warner Classics, New World Records and Chandos Records.

In 2010 she joined the New England Conservatory and teaches voice.

== Awards ==
In May 2003 she received the Singer Award from the Royal Philharmonic Society in recognition of her performance in live classical music in the UK. She has been awarded the Anna Case Mackay Memorial Award, one of the annual Outstanding Apprentice Awards from the Santa Fe Opera, U.S.A and has been nominated for a Laurence Olivier Award for outstanding achievement in Opera for her performance with the English National Opera as Lulu in Berg's eponymous opera. She is a recipient of a National Music Theater Institute grant.
