= The Plain Dealer (periodical) =

The Plain Dealer was a bi-weekly literary periodical established by the English dramatist Aaron Hill. Published in London between March 23, 1724, and May 7, 1725, Hill served as co-editor of the periodical with the poet William Bond (died 1735). Several well known English writers of 18th century published works in the periodical, including John Dennis, Martha Fowke, Richard Savage, and Edward Young. The paper was known for its strong criticism of the slave trade and its advocacy of the Bible as a source of poetic inspiration and beauty. It was also critical of oppressive patriarchy in the home and strongly opposed women being forced to marry by their parents against their wills. While not feminist and at times sexist by 21st century standards, the periodical was progressive for its time period in its overall attitudes toward women and support of women writers.
