= John Mainwaring =

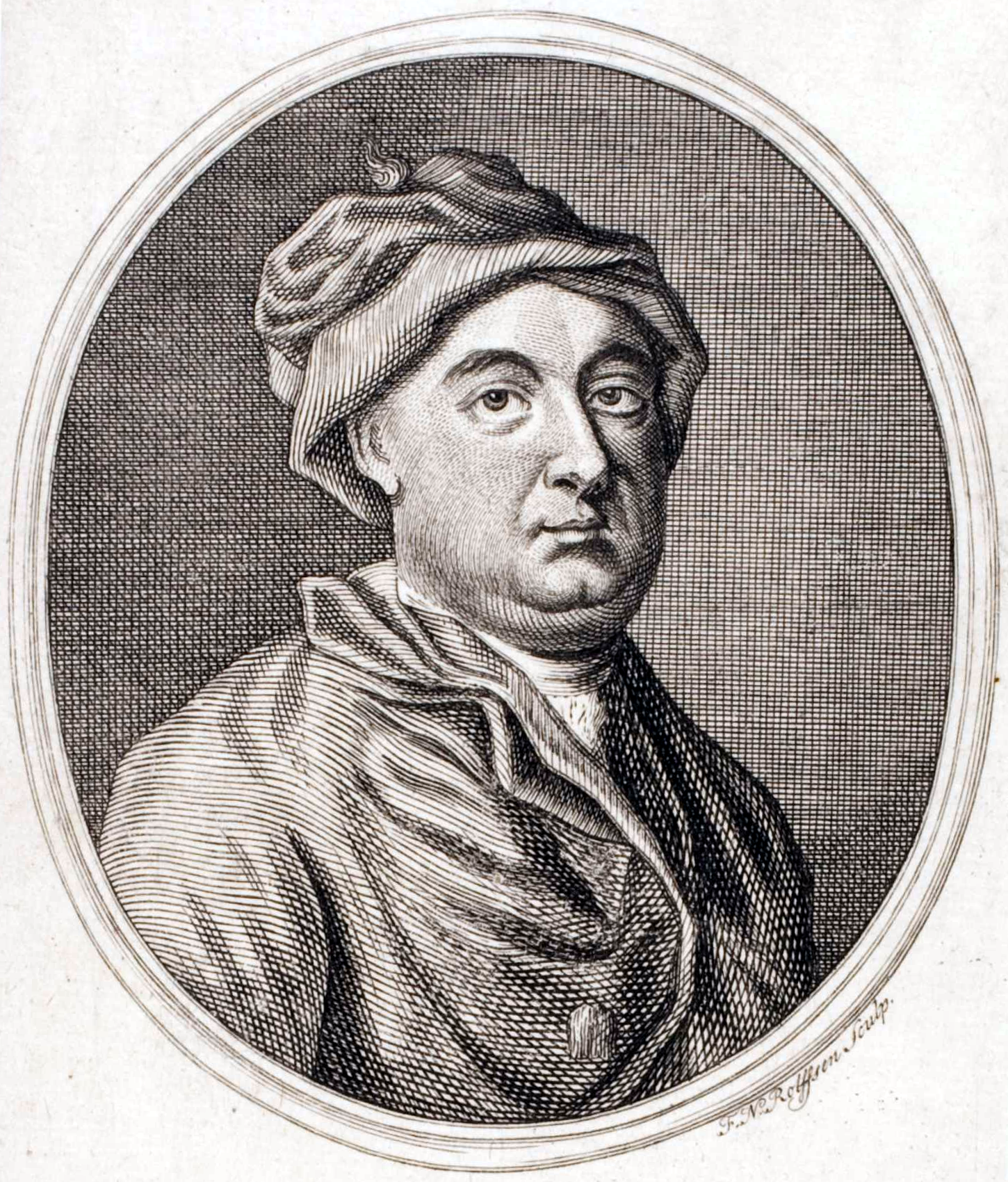
Handel on the frontispiece of John Mainwaring's Memoirs of the Life of the Late George Frederic Handel, London 1760

John Mainwaring (1724 – 15 April 1807) was an English theologian and the first biographer of the composer Georg Friedrich Händel in any language. He was a Fellow of St. John's College, Cambridge, and parish priest, and later a professor of Divinity at Cambridge.

== Life ==
He was the son of Gilbert Mainwaring of Staffordshire, and attended schools in Marlborough, Wiltshire and Tamworth, Staffordshire. He matriculated at St John's College, Cambridge in 1742, graduating B.A. in 1746, M.A. in 1750, and B.D. in 1758. It has been suggested that his university friendship with Sir Edward Littleton, 4th Baronet, who matriculated in 1744, was significant in the genesis of his Handel biography: Fisher Littleton, Edward's brother, introduced him to John Christopher Smith, Benjamin Stillingfleet and Richard Price (1717–1761) who were enthusiastic for the project.

Mainwaring became a Fellow of St John's in 1748, in which year he was ordained, continuing for 40 years until he became Lady Margaret Professor of Divinity. He was rector of Church Stretton, Shropshire from 1749, and died there on 15 April 1807.

== Biographer ==
In 1760, one year after Handel was buried in Westminster Abbey, Mainwaring published anonymously a biography Memoirs of the Life of the Late George Frederic Handel. It is not only the first biography of Handel in any language, but is claimed to be the first full length biography of any composer to appear.

More than half of this biography is focused on the years before 1712, when Handel moved to London. Therefore, it is supposed he received information from Handel himself on his early life or from John Christopher Smith. The Catalogue and the Observations are additions to the Memoirs by other authors. Charles Jennens owned a copy of the Memoirs, and provided the book with critical remarks on Semele and Benedetto Pamphili.

In 1761 Johann Mattheson published an extended translation with sharp remarks on the biography of Mainwaring.

Facsimile reprints of the "Memoirs" were published in 1964 and 1975.

== Bibliography ==
- Memoirs of the Life of the Late George Frederic Handel: To which is Added a Catalogue of His Works and Observations Upon Them, R. and J. Dodsley, 1760.
