= Senesino =

Italian castrato (1686-1758)

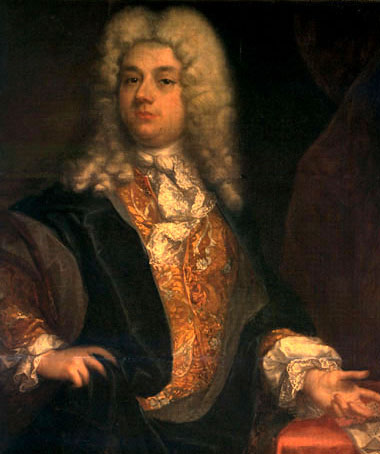
Senesino c. 1720

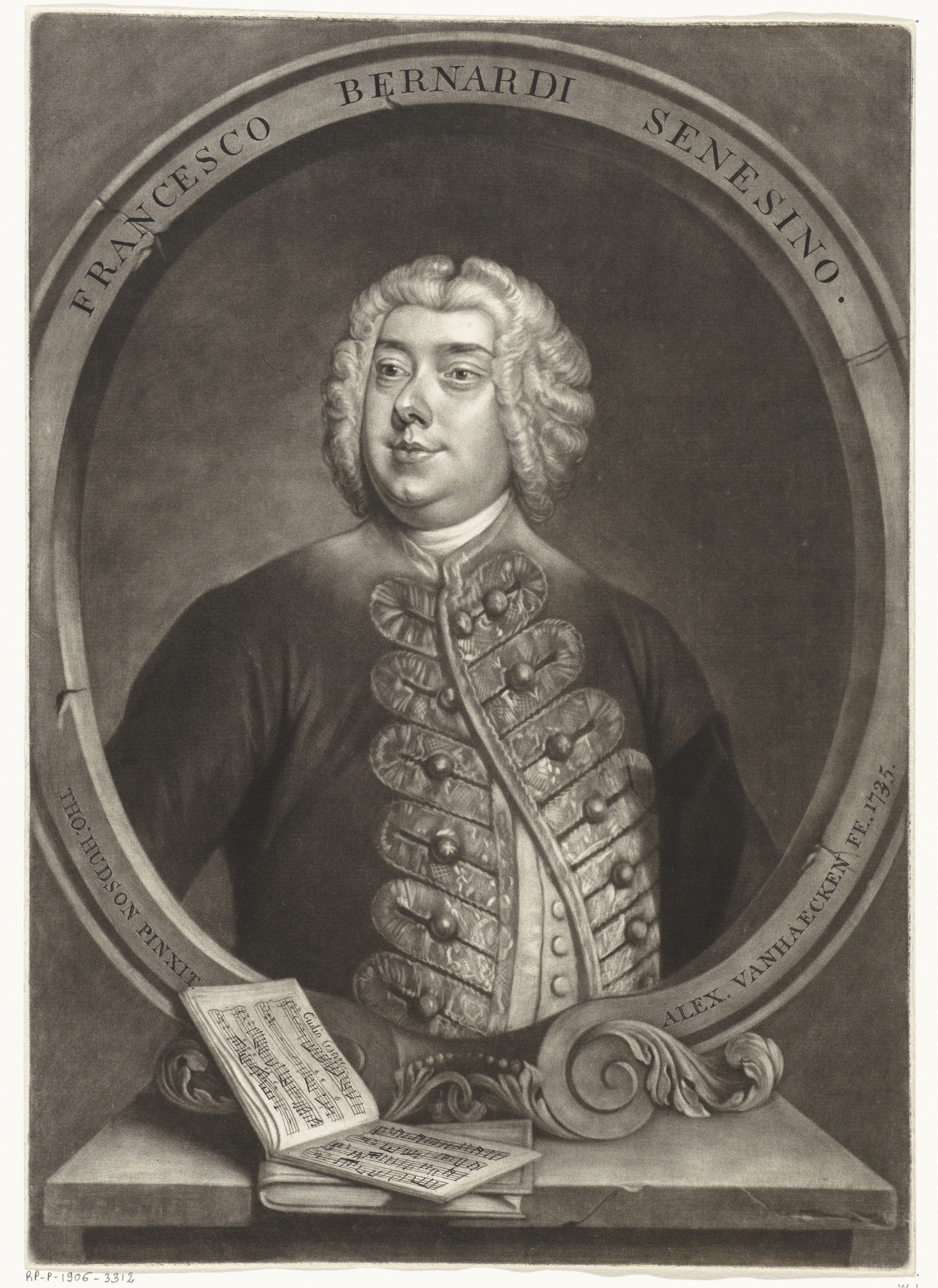
Senesino in 1735, by Van Haecken after Hudson

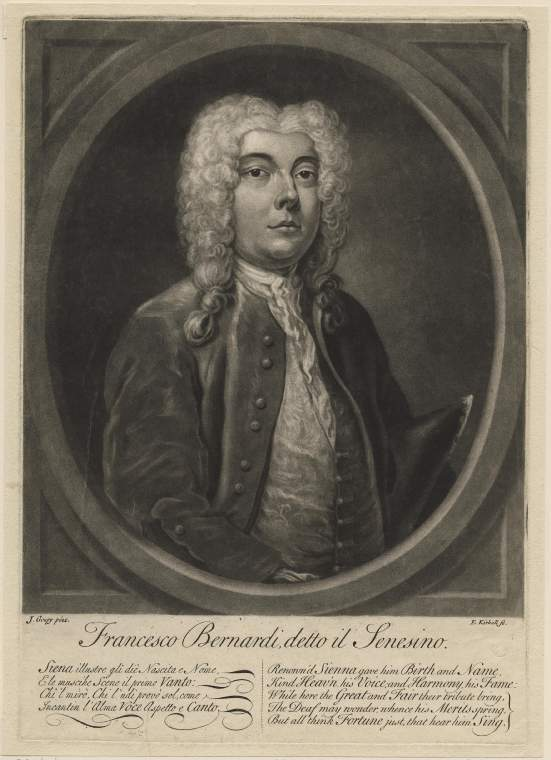
Portrait of the contralto castrato Francesco Bernardi, better known under his stage name Senesino; at the same time a parody of the castrati and their singing – and the wealth they earned with it. The lines beneath the portrait read, in Italian and English: "Renown'd Sienna gave him birth and name / Kind Heaven his Voice and Harmony his Fame / While here the Great and Fair their Tribute bring / The Deaf may wonder whence his Merits spring / But all think Fortune just, that hear him sing".

Francesco Bernardi (pronounced [franˈtʃesko berˈnardi]; 31 October 1686 – 27 November 1758), known as Senesino (pronounced [seneˈziːno] or traditionally [seneˈsiːno]), was an Italian contralto castrato, particularly remembered today for his long collaboration with the composer George Frideric Handel. He was also involved in a public scandal with the soprano Anastasia Robinson in 1724, which was circulated widely by the satirist Jonathan Swift, and inspired a number of anonymously-written obscene, misogynistic, and at times sexually subversive epistles written between 1724 and 1736 which have become a topic of study among scholars of Restoration literature.

== Early life and career ==
Senesino was the son of a barber from Siena (hence his stage-name). He joined the cathedral choir there in 1695 and was castrated at the comparatively late age of thirteen. His debut was at Venice in 1707, and during the next decade he acquired a European reputation and, by the time he sang in Lotti's Giove in Argo in 1717 at Dresden, a commensurately enormous salary.

As with many castrati, reports of Senesino's acting were not always positive, to say the least. The impresario Count Francesco Zambeccari wrote of his performance in Naples in 1715: "Senesino continues to comport himself badly enough; he stands like a statue, and when occasionally he does make a gesture, he makes one directly the opposite of what is wanted." Of the singer's vocal abilities, however, there was no doubt. In 1719, the composer Quantz heard him in Lotti's Teofane at Dresden, and stated: "He had a powerful, clear, equal and sweet contralto voice, with a perfect intonation and an excellent shake. His manner of singing was masterly and his elocution unrivalled. … he sang allegros with great fire, and marked rapid divisions, from the chest, in an articulate and pleasing manner. His countenance was well adapted to the stage, and his action was natural and noble. To these qualities he joined a majestic figure; but his aspect and deportment were more suited to the part of a hero than of a lover."

== Senesino and Handel ==
Following a dispute with the court composer Johann David Heinichen in 1720, over an aria in the opera Flavio Crispo, which led to his dismissal, Senesino was engaged by Handel as primo uomo (lead male singer) in his company, the Royal Academy of Music. He made his first appearance in a revival of Radamisto on 28 December, and his salary was variously reported as between £2000 and 3000 guineas: both vast sums. Senesino remained in London for much of the succeeding sixteen years. He became a friend and associate of many in the highest levels of society: these included the Duke of Chandos, Lord Burlington and the landscape designer William Kent. In addition, Senesino amassed a fine collection of paintings, rare books, scientific instruments, and other treasures, including a service of silver made by the famous Paul de Lamerie.

Despite creating seventeen leading roles for Handel (including Giulio Cesare, Orlando, and Bertarido in Rodelinda), his relationship with the composer was frequently stormy: "The one was perfectly refractory; the other was equally outrageous," according to the contemporary historian Mainwaring. After the break-up of Handel's Royal Academy in 1728, Senesino sang in Paris (1728) and Venice (1729), but was re-engaged by Handel in 1730, singing in four more new operas and in the oratorios Esther, Deborah, and, in its 1732 bilingual version, Acis and Galatea. His antipathy to Handel eventually became so great that, in 1733, Senesino joined the rival Opera of the Nobility. This meant that he came to sing alongside the great soprano castrato Farinelli, and their meeting on stage (in the pasticcio Artaserse) led to a famous anecdote of Senesino breaking character, as reported by the music historian Charles Burney.

Senesino had the part of a furious tyrant, and Farinelli that of an unfortunate hero in chains; but in the course of the first air, the captive so softened the heart of the tyrant, that Senesino, forgetting his stage-character, ran to Farinelli and embraced him in his own.

Both Senesino and Farinelli also appeared in Nicola Porpora's opera Polifemo in 1735.

== Senesino and scandal with Anastasia Robinson ==
In February 1724, a scandal involving Senesino and the soprano Anastasia Robinson erupted which had long-lasting impact on both singers, more particularly Robinson. Although the exact details of the initial incident are unknown, scholars suspect that the incident occurred during a performance of Attilio Ariosti's Vespasiano e Artaserse which had its world premiere earlier on 14 January 1724. In this opera, Robinson's character Gesilla embraces Senesino's character Titus while they share mutual sentiments of love. The incident in question involved a public altercation of some kind in which Robinson accused Senesino of being too sexually forward in his acting, and Senesino responding with some sort of insulting remarks that attacked her virtue and beauty. This in turn resulted in Robinson's husband, Charles Mordaunt, 3rd Earl of Peterborough, coming to her defence. The Earl, however, was not publicly known to be Robinson's husband, as they had secretly married in c. 1722–1723: in view of Robinson's lower social status as a stage performer, he refused to acknowledge her publicly as his wife. Therefore, it was generally believed in society that Robinson was the Earl's mistress.

The event of this public exchange between Senesino, Robinson, and the Earl became topical fodder for Irish satirist Jonathan Swift who circulated the story. The subject was widely gossiped about in British society, and Robinson in particular was labelled a hypocrite for complaining of sexual impropriety while simultaneously being the Earl's mistress. Swift's writing in turn inspired the creation of a number of obscene, misogynistic, and at times sexually subversive epistles written about Robinson, Senesino, the Earl of Peterborough, and the castrato Farinelli between 1724 and 1736. These satirical epistles were penned by anonymous authors, and were written from the perspective of one of the individuals involved in the scandal. The first of these was An Epistle from Senesino to Anastasia Robinson which was dated 17 February 1724. Soon after, the dramatist Aaron Hill in his literary periodical The Plain Dealer published a response to this letter entitled An Answer from Mrs. Robinson. Thus began a chain of literary epistles that extended over a twelve-year period. These epistles have become a subject of study by scholars of Restoration literature.

== Return to Italy and retirement ==
Senesino left Britain in 1736, and appeared in a few more productions in Italy: he sang in Florence from 1737 to 1739, and then in Naples until 1740, making his final appearance in Porpora's Il trionfo di Camilla at the Teatro San Carlo. By this time his singing style was regarded by the public as rather old-fashioned. He retired to the city of his birth, building a fine town-house there which he filled with English furniture and effects - he enjoyed tea (he ran his entire household on English lines, or at least attempted to do so), and kept a black servant, a pet monkey and a parrot. A somewhat eccentric and difficult personality, the latter years of his life were plagued by disputes with members of his family, particularly his nephew and heir, Giuseppe.
