= Margherita Durastanti =

Italian singer

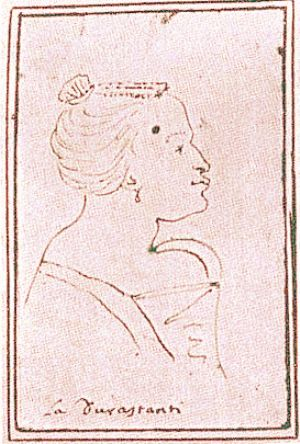
A caricature of Margherita Durastanti, drawn while she was prima donna at the Teatro San Giovanni Grisostomo, Venice, between 1709 and 1712.

Margherita Durastanti (active 1700–1734) was an Italian singer of the 18th century. Vocally, she is best described as a soprano, though later in her career her tessitura descended to that of a mezzo-soprano. First heard of professionally in Mantua in 1700–01, she later appeared in Bologna and Reggio Emilia (1710), Milan and Reggio (1713) and Florence (1715). Today she is particularly remembered for her association with the composer George Frideric Handel: indeed she enjoyed a longer personal association with the composer than any other musician.

As well as performing many of his early Italian solo cantatas, Durastanti's first roles for Handel included Mary Magdalene in his oratorio La resurrezione (1708) and the title role in Agrippina (1709), in her capacity as prima donna of the S Giovanni Grisostomo Theatre in Venice, where she sang from 1709 to 1712. After singing at Parma, Florence, Naples (where she appeared in operas by Scarlatti), and, in 1719, Dresden, she came to London in 1720. News of her imminent arrival evinced the following unflattering comment from the librettist Rolli:

It is said for certain that Durastanti will be coming for the operas. Oh! What a bad choice for England! I shall not enter into her singing merits, but she really is an Elephant!

However, she received a strong recommendation from Steffan Benedetto Pallavicini, court poet at Dresden:

You will find my recommendation not only trustworthy, but even superfluous, because this worthy virtuosa will recommend herself, for she is among the most excellent actresses who have appeared in the theatre here in recent years.

She was offered her contract by the Royal Academy company rather late in the day, so was probably not the Academy's first choice as a member of it. Handel on the other hand stayed in Dresden until her contract arrived. The roles Handel wrote for her during the next five years demonstrate her considerable abilities as a musician and actress, displaying a wide range of characters, both male and female, and an ability to cope with wide dissonant leaps in vocal lines and other difficulties, such as chromaticism and dramatic pauses.

== First period in England ==
Though engaged as the first prima donna in the new company, she in effect began as primo uomo ("first man"), creating the name-part in Radamisto in April 1720. She was gradually demoted as more vocally gifted singers arrived, though even her lower-status roles, such as that of Sesto in Giulio Cesare (1724) made considerable vocal and theatrical demands. In 1721 she gave birth to a girl, and King George I and the Princess Royal were among the child's godparents; in the autumn of that year she sang in Germany, and then in Italy during the spring of 1722. She returned to London in October 1722, but found herself superseded as "first woman" by the new sensation Francesca Cuzzoni. Clearly not particularly disconcerted by this turn of events, she remained in Handel's company for a further two seasons. Her final performance for him was a revival of Ariosti's Coriolano (March 1724), given for her benefit. In it she sang an English cantata to a text by Pope containing the lines "But let old charmers yield to new; /Happy soil, adieu, adieu!".

== Second period in England ==
Handel brought Durastanti back to England for his 1733–34 season, when she sang in revivals of Ottone and Il pastor fido, as well as several pasticcios. By this time she was probably in her fifties, and had been singing professionally for over thirty years. It is testimony to her enduring abilities that an aristocratic opera-lover of the time, Lady Bristol, was moved to comment:

... Carestini, ... I can find to be an extreme good singer; the rest are all scrubs except old Durastante, that sings as well as she ever did.

Although there is little surviving contemporary opinion of Durastanti's singing, Charles Burney wrote insightfully, though at second hand, of her performance in the first revival of Handel's Floridante in 1722:

When this opera was afterwards revived, and the Durastanti performed Mrs Robinson's part, additional airs were composed to display her peculiar powers; and we find by these, that her abilities as a singer and musician were greatly superior to those of her predecessor, though perhaps less amiable and captivating to an audience, or at least to the spectators. One of these airs, Dolce mia speranza, is the most pathetic and beautiful of the slow Siciliana kind I ever heard.
