= Attilio Ariosti =

Italian composer

Attilius Ariosti
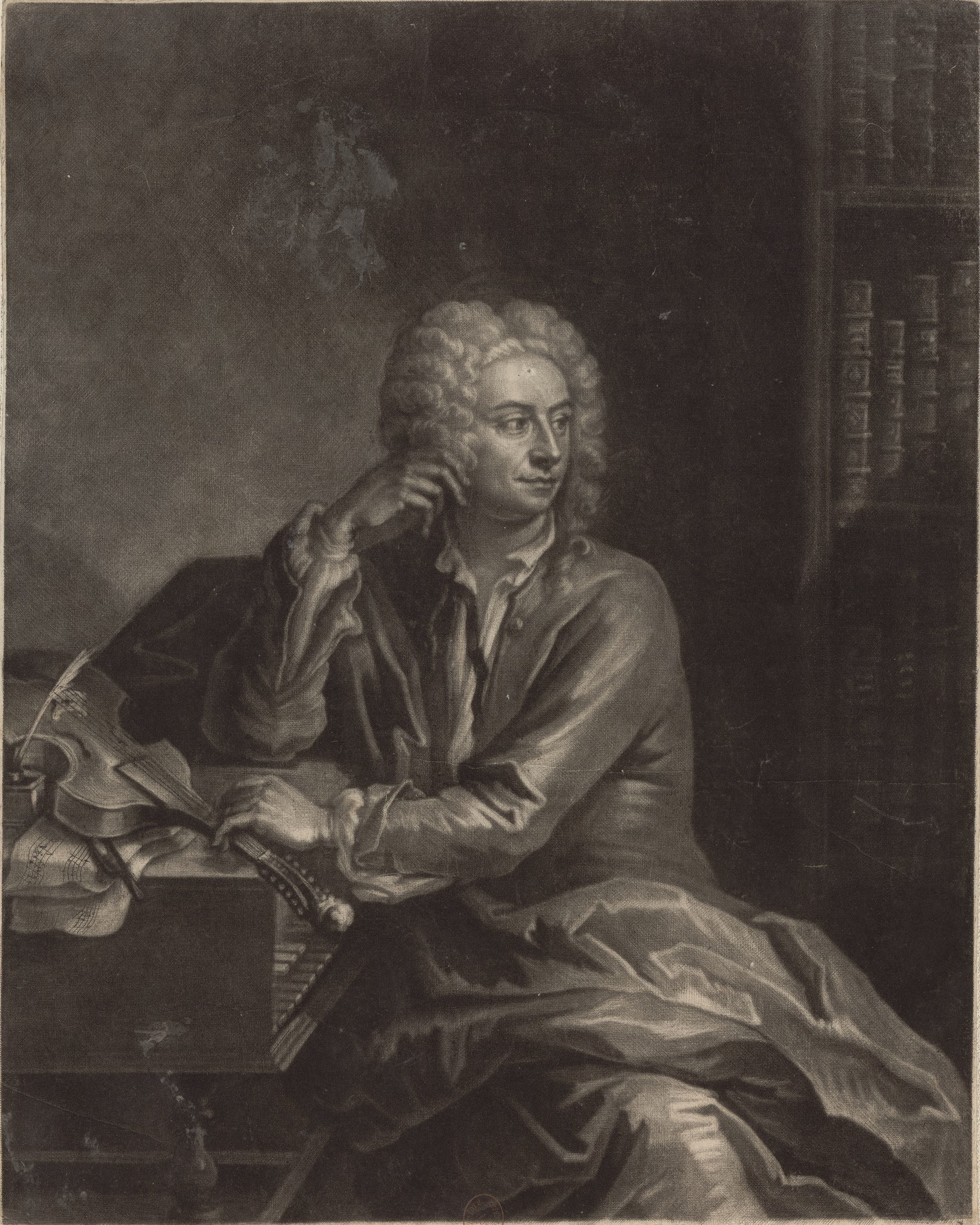
- Born: 5 November 1666; Bologna, Italy
- Died: 1729 (aged 62–63)
- Occupations: Composer; Cellist

Attilio Malachia Ariosti (or Frate Ottavio) (5 November 1666 – 1729) was a Servite Friar and Italian composer in the Baroque style. He produced more than 30 operas and oratorios, numerous cantatas and instrumental works.

== Life ==
Ariosti was born in Bologna into a middle-class family. He became a monk in 1688 at age 22, but he soon obtained permission to leave the order and become a composer in the court of the Duke of Mantua and Monferrato. He became a deacon in 1692, the same year he achieved the post of organist at Santa Maria dei Servi in Bologna.

In 1697, he went to Berlin at the request of Sophia Charlotte of Hanover, Queen of Prussia, a great-granddaughter of James I of England and daughter of the Electress Sophia of Hanover, an enlightened patroness of the arts with a keen interest in music. After enjoying the favor of the Queen, Ariosti wrote and collaborated in the writing of a number of stage works performed for the court in Berlin. He resided in Berlin as the court composer until 1703. A portrait painting of Ariosti, by Anthoni Schoonjans (1655–1726), is still present in Charlottenburg Palace.

His first opera was performed in Venice in 1697. From 1703 to 1709, he was the General Austrian Agent for Italy, during the reign of Joseph I. After 1716, he achieved enormous success in Paris and London. In London, he shared with Georg Frideric Handel and Giovanni Bononcini the directorship of the Royal Academy of Music, and he played the viola d’amore in an entr’acte in Handel's Amadigi di Gaula. In 1724, he published a Collection of Cantatas, and Lessons for the Viola d'Amour, which he sold by subscription. This publication may have been the most successful sale of music by subscription in the 18th century.

Although he could sing and write drama, as well as play the violoncello and the harpsichord; his favorite instrument was the viola d'amore, for which he wrote 21 solo sonatas. These are usually called the Stockholm Sonatas, as the sole surviving source for most of them is in the Statens Musikbibliotek in Stockholm, Sweden. The Stockholm Sonatas display Ariosti's liking for surprising harmonies, his inventive use of silence, and his wit.

== Works ==
=== Instrumental music ===
- Concerts (lost)
- Six published sonatas (or Lessons) and a large collection of pieces in manuscript (commonly grouped to form 15 sonatas) for viola d'amore and basso continuo.

=== Oratorios ===
The best known is "La Passione di Cristo" (Vienna, 1709)

=== Operas ===
Altogether 23 operas, among them:

- "La festa di Imeneo" - (Berlin) balletto.
- "Atys" - (Berlin).
- "La fede nei tradimenti" - (Berlin, 1701).
- "Marte e Irene" - (Berlin, 1703).
- "I gloriosi presagi del Scipione Africano" - (Vienna, 1704).
- "La profezia d'Eliseo nell'assedio di Samaria" - (Vienna, 1705).
- "Marte placato" - (Vienna, 1707).
- "La gara delle antiche eroine ne' campi elisi" - (Vienna, 1707).
- "Amor tra nemici" - (Vienna, 1708).
- "La Placidia" - (Vienna, 1709).
- "Coriolano" - (London, 1723).
- "Lucio Vero" - (London, 1726).
- "Vespasiano e Artaserse" - (London, 1724).
- "Dario" - (London, 1725).

=== Librettos ===
- "Gli amori di Polifemo", music by Giovanni Bononcini.

=== Recordings ===
- "The Stockholm Sonatas, Sonatas for Viola d’ Amore", performed by Chiara Massini, Giorgia Veneziano, and Ute Groh ( 2022, Da Vinci Classics CD 7.46160913759)
