= Giuseppe Maria Boschi =

Italian opera singer

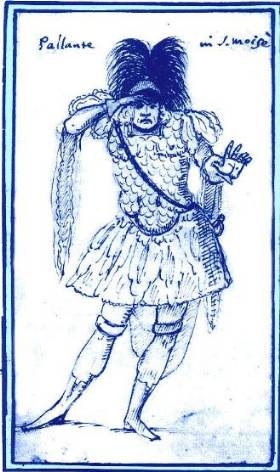
A caricature of Boschi

Giuseppe Maria Boschi (born Viterbo[?]; fl 1698–1744) was an Italian bass singer – though in modern terms a baritone – of the 18th century. He is best remembered for his association with the composer George Frideric Handel, whom he worked for in both Italy and London.

During the first decade of the century he is known to have performed at Casale Monferrato, Vicenza, Ferrara, Vienna, Bologna and at Venice, where he created the role of Pallas in Handel's Agrippina for the 1709–1710 Carnevale season. He made his London début in 1710 and, after 1711, returned to northern Italy, where he appeared in Venice, Verona, Bologna and Genoa. From 1717 to 1720 he was active primarily in Dresden. From 1720 to 1728 he was engaged by the Handel's Royal Academy of Music in London, where he sang in all of the 32 operas that the organisation produced during that time. These included 7 each by Bononcini and Ariosti, and 13 by Handel. Subsequently, he returned to Venice.

Boschi's tessitura was, in modern terms, that of a high baritone. Typically, it seems as though he excelled at so-called "rage arias", most of which Handel provided with energetic counterpoint. He created the roles of Achilla in Giulio Cesare, Garibaldo in Rodelinda, Lotario in Flavio, and Araspe in Tolomeo. Most of the parts he played were those of rulers or villains. In 1698 he married the contralto Francesca Vanini-Boschi.
