= Antonio Barbieri =

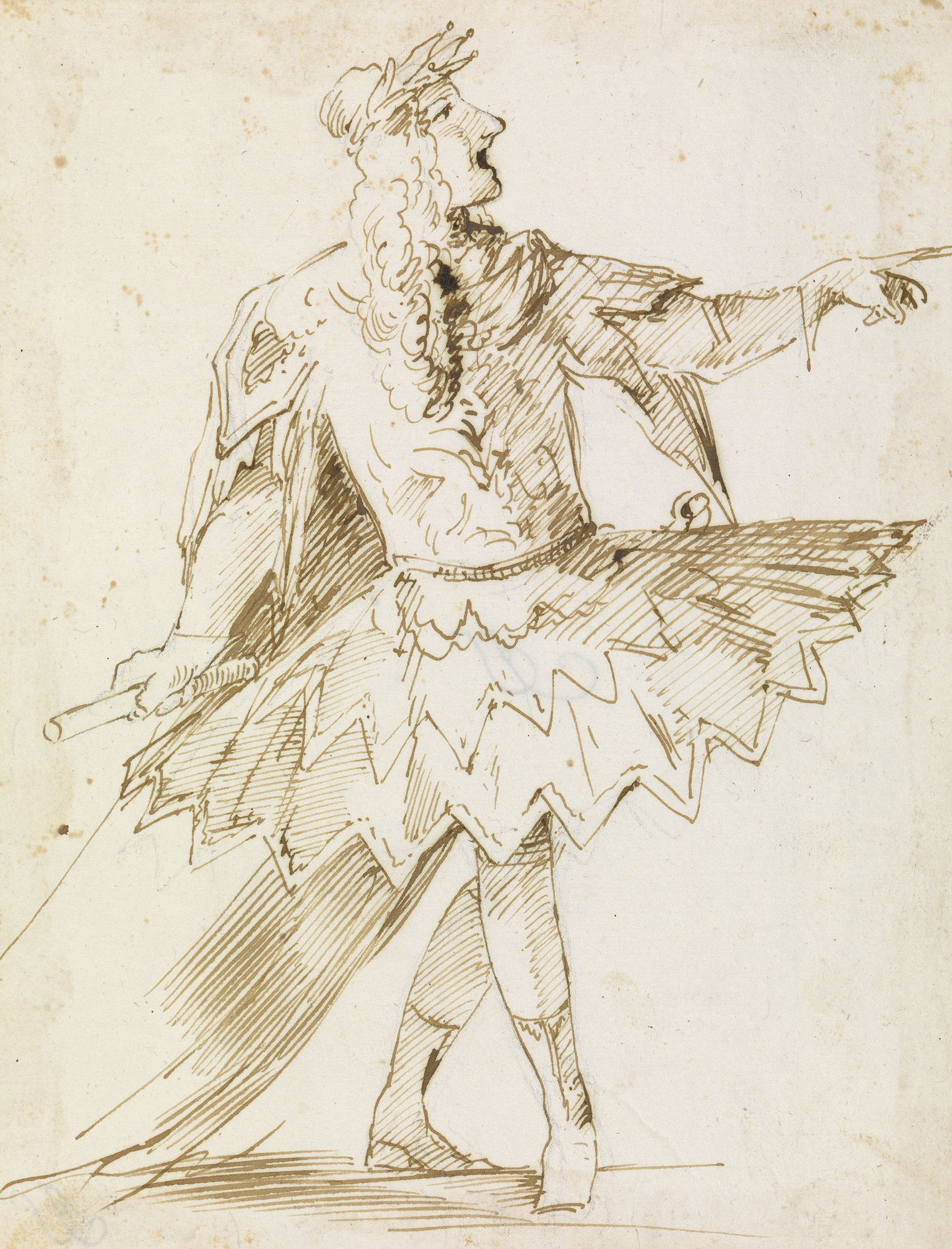
1725 caricature of Antonio Barbieri by Marco Ricci.

Antonio Barbieri (fl. 1720 – c. 1767) was an Italian tenor.

== Biography ==
A native of Reggio Emilia, the exact year of Antonio Barbieri's birth is unknown. He may have been related to the operatic contralto Santi Barbieri. From 1720 to 1732 Antonio Barbieri was a court singer in the service to Philip of Hesse-Darmstadt, the governor of Mantua. His earliest known performance was in the premiere of Antonio Vivaldi’s opera La Candace, o siano Li veri amici (1720) at the Teatro Arciducale in Mantua. He performed regularly in Venetian theaters from 1720 to 1738 with a repertoire encompassing 23 different operas. He made his Venice debut as Mamud in Vivaldi's La verità in cimento at the Teatro San Angelo (TSA) in October 1720. In 1721 he portrayed Creon in Giuseppe Maria Orlandini's Antigona at the TSA.

Some of the other operas Barbieri sang in Venice included Vivaldi's Filippo re di Macedonia (1720, as Antigono), Giovanni Porta's Venceslao (1722, as the King of Poland), Fortunato Chelleri's L'amor tirannico (1722, as Tiridate), Giuseppe Maria Orlandini's Berenice (1725, as Flaviano), Leonardo Vinci's La Rosmira fedele (1725, as Armindo), Vinci's Gismondo, Re di Polonia (1727, as Primislao), Vinci's Siroe, Re di Persia (1731, as Cosroe), Luca Antonio Predieri's Scipione il giovane (1731, as Antioco), Geminiano Giacomelli's Epaminonda (1732, as Epaminonda), Johann Adolph Hasse's Il Demetrio (1732, as Fenicio), Giacomelli's Adriano in Siria (1733, as Emperor Hadrian), and Nicola Porpora's Lucio Papirio (1737, as Lucio Papirio).

Barbieri also worked as an opera singer in theaters in other cities on the Italian peninsula from 1720 to 1740. These included performances in Reggio Emilia (1720), Rome (beginning in 1724), Parma and Florence (both 1725 and 1734–1735), and Naples (1727–1729). With his wife, the opera singer Livia Bassi Barbieri, he performed in Vivaldi’s Farnace in Pavia in 1731. He also performed with her in Venice and Florence in 1734-1735. Some of his final opera performances were in Turin in 1739-1740.

From 1736 to 1767 Barbieri held the post of maetro di manieri at the Ospedale di San Lazaro e dei Mendicanti in Venice. Karl-Josef Kutsch and Leo Riemens speculate that he may have died in 1767, but this is not for certain.
