= Argippo =

Opera by Antonio Vivaldi

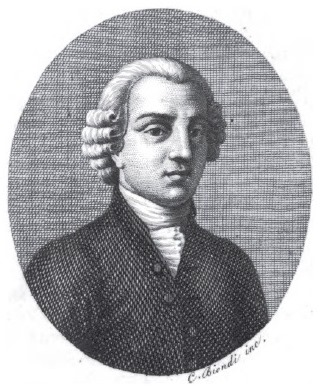
Domenico Lalli, author of the Argippo libretto, which had previously been set as Il gran Mogol by Francesco Mancini (1713).

Argippo is an opera libretto by Domenico Lalli, which in Giovanni Porta's setting premiered in Venice in 1717. Claudio Nicola Stampa's reworked version of the libretto was set as L'Argippo by Andrea Stefano Fiorè. This opera was performed in Milan in 1722.

Antonio Vivaldi's Argippo, RV 697, based on Stampa's version of the libretto, was staged in two different versions in 1730, first in Vienna (RV 697-A), and later in Prague (RV 697-B). The music of both of these versions was lost until Czech composer Ondřej Macek rediscovered it. The opera was then performed in 2008 for the first time since the first half of the 18th century. Vivaldi's setting of the Argippo libretto partially survives in a pasticcio, RV Anh. 137, which, in the 21st century, was the basis for a reconstruction of the Prague version of Vivaldi's opera.

== Libretto ==
Domenico Lalli's Il gran Mogol libretto was set by Francesco Mancini, and performed in the Teatro San Bartolomeo, Naples, in December 1713. In the next two decades this libretto was set as Argippo by several composers:

- Setting by Giovanni Porta, performed in 1717 in Venice.
- L'Argippo, a setting by Andrea Stefano Fiorè of Claudio Nicola Stampa's reworked version of the libretto, was staged in Milan in 1722.
- Antonio Vivaldi based his Argippo, RV 697-A, which premiered in Vienna in 1730, on Stampa's adaptation of Lalli's libretto (music lost).
- Vivaldi used a variant of this libretto for his Argippo, RV 697-B, staged in Prague in the autumn of 1730 (music lost).
- Vivaldi's setting of the text based on Lalli's libretto was partially preserved in a pasticcio, Argippo, RV Anh. 137.
- Another Argippo pasticcio, credited to Antonio Costantini, and based on Lalli's libretto, was performed in the 1733 carnival season in Brno.

=== Roles ===
Role	Porta 1717		Fiorè 1722	Vivaldi 2008 (rec.)	
Role	Voice t.	Cast	Cast	Voice t.	Cast
Argippo, king	soprano	Valentino Urbani	Giuliano Albertini	mezzo	Veronika Mráčková Fučíková
Tisifaro, mogol	tenor	Gaetano Borghi	Gio. Battista Pinacci	baritone	Zdeněk Kapl
Zanaida, daughter of Tisifaro	alto	Diana Vico	Vittoria Tesi	mezzo	Pavla Štěpničková
Osira, wife of Argippo	soprano	Antonia Gavazzi	Anna Guglielmina	soprano	Jana Bínová-Koucká
Silvero, secretly married to Zanaida	alto	Gio. Battista Minelli	Carlo Scalzi	soprano	Barbora Sojková
Mesio, in love with Osira	bass	Antinoro Claudii	Maria Antonina Tozzi	—	—

=== Synopsis ===
The opera, in three acts, is set in an Indian royal court and centers around a young princess smitten by a dishonest suitor.

== 1717–1722 ==
Porta's setting of Lalli's Argippo libretto was first performed in Venice in 1717. Fiorè's setting of Stampa's adaptation of the Argippo libretto was first performed in Milan in 1722.

=== Porta ===
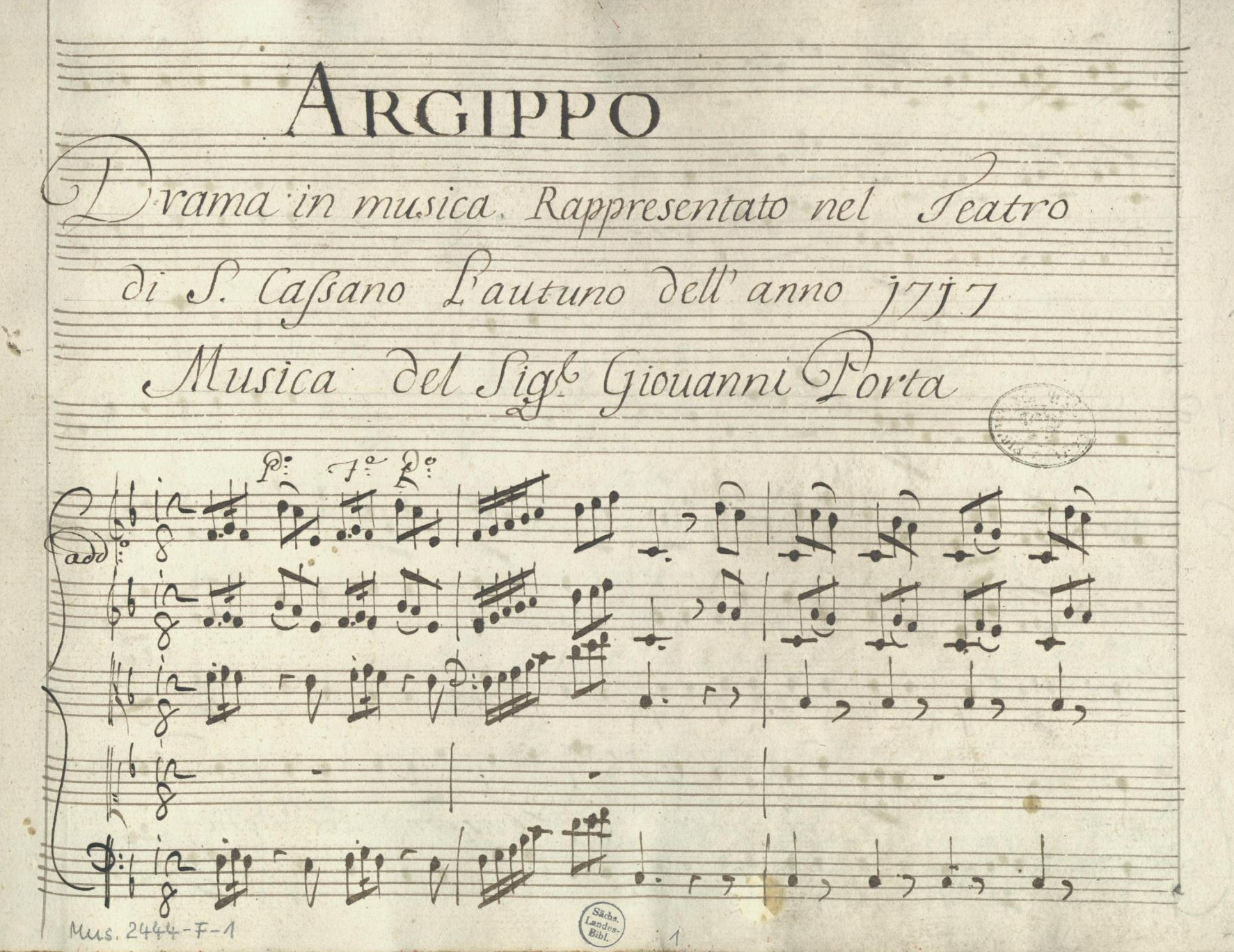
First page of the manuscript score of Giovanni Porta's Argippo (1717).

Porta's Argippo was first performed on 31 October 1717 in Venice, in the Teatro San Cassiano. Both the printed libretto (titled L'Argippo: Drama per musica) and the manuscript score (titled Argippo) of this performance survive. A four-page dedication by Lalli precedes the text of his libretto. There is no sinfonia (overture) in the score. There are fifteen scenes in the first act, fourteen in the second act, and nine in the last act. The text in the score closely follows the original libretto. The printed libretto contains text variants for nine arias, but it is not known whether these alternative texts were set by Porta.

In 1722, Porta's opera was re-staged in Venice, this time in the Teatro San Moisè. Also for this production, Lalli wrote a dedication in the printed libretto.

=== Fiorè ===
L'Argippo was staged in the Regio Ducal Teatro in Milan in honour of the 31st birthday of Elisabeth Christine of Brunswick-Wolfenbüttel, Holy Roman Empress, which fell on 28 August 1722. The dedication, dated 27 August 1722 in the extant libretto, was written by Giuseppe Ferdinando Brivio and addressed at Girolamo di Colloredo-Waldsee, who was the then-time Austrian governor of the Duchy of Milan. Stampa added an introduction to this revised version of Lalli's libretto, which was set by Fiorè.

The libretto describes three stage settings for the fourteen scenes of the first act, while the second act (twelve scenes) and the third act (eleven scenes) each have two different stage settings. A reprint of the libretto was published in 2018.

== Vivaldi's RV 697, pasticcios and a reconstruction ==
Basis for "Gelido in ogni vena" aria of RV 697
Vivaldi's L'inverno (Winter), First movement, Allegro non molto (3:18)
Performed by the United States Air Force Band

In a letter he wrote in 1737, Vivaldi mentions he had been called to Vienna: according to Michael Talbot, this was likely on invitation by the Theater am Kärntnertor where the first version of his Argippo, RV 697, was presented as an intermezzo in 1730. Later that year, a somewhat more extended version of this opera was performed by a company of mostly Italian performers in the theatre of Franz Anton von Sporck in Prague. A few years later, this Italian ensemble performed in Regensburg, where a score with at least six arias from Vivaldi's Argippo was recovered.

=== 1730 ===
Two closely related German versions of the Argippo libretto were published in 1730:

- one for a performance in the Theater am Kärntnertor in Vienna, translated by Heinrich Rademin;
- a more extended one for the Sporck Theater in Prague.

Both contain an aria titled "Gelido in ogni vena", on a text extracted from Metastasio's Siroe, re di Persia libretto, and which Vivaldi had for instance also inserted in his Farnace opera, there based on music from his L'Inverno concerto. The libretto variants were based on Stampa's adaptation of Lalli's text, but were transmitted without their respective settings. Only the Prague libretto names Vivaldi as composer: because of the similarities between both texts Vivaldi is however considered the composer in both cases. The Vienna version, which was probably performed before the Prague version, received the RV 697-A number, and RV 697-B was assigned to the opera performed in the Sporck Theater.

=== Pasticcios ===
RV Anh. 137 is an Argippo pasticcio that survives in two manuscripts:

- A complete score, Mus.ms 245 of the Universitäts- und Landesbibliothek Darmstadt.
- An extract of 19 arias of this pasticcio, the score of which is preserved at the Fürst Thurn und Taxis Hofbibliothek und Zentralarchiv in Regensburg (D-Rtt Prota 4).

This pasticcio contains at least six arias by Vivaldi.

Another Argippo pasticcio was performed in Brno in 1733. The libretto of this production survives without music: as a pasticcio it may have contained arias by Vivaldi.

Arias in RV Anh. 137 and RV 697 (text matches highlighted)
RV Anh. 137			RV 697		Other Vivaldi
sc	Aria	Composer	#	Aria	Other Vivaldi
I sc1	Se lento ancora il fulmine	Vivaldi	I, 1	Se lento ancora il fulmine	
I sc2	Rege son che combattuto	Hasse	—		
I sc3	Del fallire il rimorso	Vivaldi	I, 2	Del fallire il rimorso	
I sc4	Anche in mezzo a perigliosa	Galeazzi	I, 3	Tuona spesso all'aer cieco	
I sc5	Qual disarmata nave	Pescetti	I, 4	Vidi appena un sol baleno	
I sc6	Dov'è la morte per me	Pescetti	I, 5	Non v'è perdono	
II sc1	Che gran pena trafigge	Hasse	II, 1	Del giusto mio dolore	
II sc2	Non temer e dati pace	?	II, 2	Chi quel Timor condanna	
II sc3	Bell'idolo amato	Porpora	—		
II sc4	Un certo non so che	Vivaldi	II, 3	Un certo non so che	
II sc5,6	—		II, 4	Io vorrei col sangue, e vita	
II sc7	Io son rea dell'onor mio	Vivaldi	II, 5	Io son rea dell'onor mio	
II sc8	A piedi miei svenato	?	II, 6	Suole ancora lamentarsi	
II sc[9]	Da più venti combattuta	Galeazzi	—		
III sc1	Mi sento nel core un raggio	Pescetti	III, 1	Mi sento nel core	
III sc2	Vado a morir per te	Fiorè	III, 2	Vado a morir per te	
III sc3	Vi sarà stella clemente	Pescetti	III, 3	Gelido in ogni vena	RV 711-D/II:6
III sc4	Se d'un amor tiranno	Vinci	III, 4	L'incerto tuo pensiere	
III sc5	Se la bella tortorella	?	III, 5	Un pensiero	
III sc6	—		III, 6	In bosco romito	RV 702-B/III:7
III sc7	Che farai perdonerai	Vivaldi	III, 7	Che farai? Perdonerai	

=== Recovering Argippo music ===
In 2008 Ondřej Macek presented his reconstruction of Vivaldi's Argippo, which he had based on extant librettos, on the Vivaldi arias in the Regensburg pasticcio score—which he had recovered two years earlier—, and on other music the Venetian composer had written around 1730. Macek performed this opera with the Hofmusici Baroque Ensemble, first in Prague, and later in Venice. A live recording of the Venice performance, which with inclusion of sinfonias derived from Vivaldi concertos lasts around two hours, was issued on CD in 2009. Argippo Resurrected is a 2009 Czech documentary about Macek's recovery, reconstruction and performance of Vivaldi's Argippo music.

The full version of the RV Anh. 137 pasticcio was recovered in Darmstadt, where it had previously been classified under an erroneous title, and misattributed to Ernst Christian Hesse. A digitized facsimile of this score was made available on the website of the Universitäts- und Landesbibliothek Darmstadt.
