= List of operas by Nicola Porpora =

This is a complete list of the operas written by the Italian composer Nicola Porpora (1686–1768).

== List ==
Title	Genre	Subdivisions	Libretto	Première date	Place, theatre
Agrippina	opera seria	3 acts	Nicola Giuvo	4 November 1708	Naples, Palazzo Reale
Flavio Anicio Olibrio	opera seria	3 acts	Apostolo Zeno and Pietro Pariati	January 1711	Naples, Teatro San Bartolomeo
Basilio, re di Oriente	opera seria		after Giovanni Battista Neri	24 June 1713	Naples, Teatro dei Fiorentini
Arianna e Teseo	opera seria		Pietro Pariati	1714	Vienna, Hof
Berenice regina d'Egitto, ovvero Le gare di amore	opera seria	3 acts	Antonio Salvi	carnival 1718	Rome, Teatro Capranica
Temistocle	opera seria	3 acts	Apostolo Zeno	1 October 1718	Vienna, Hof
Faramondo	opera seria		Apostolo Zeno, after Gautier de Costes de La Calprenède	19 November 1719	Naples, Teatro San Bartolomeo
Angelica	serenata		Metastasio, after Ludovico Ariosto	28 August 1720	Naples, Palazzo del Principe di Torella
Eumene	opera seria		Apostolo Zeno	carnival 1721	Rome, Teatro Alibert
Gli orti esperidi	serenata		Metastasio	28 August 1721	Naples, Palazzo Reale
Flavio Anicio Olibrio (revision)	opera seria	3 acts	Apostolo Zeno and Pietro Pariati	carnival 1722	Rome, Teatro Alibert
Adelaide	opera seria		Antonio Salvi	carnival 1723	Rome, Teatro Alibert
Amare per regnare	opera seria		after Francesco Passarini's Amore e fortunata	12 December 1723	Naples, Teatro San Bartolomeo
Imeneo	componimento drammatico	2 acts	Silvio Stampiglia	1723	Naples
Semiramide regina dell'Assiria	opera seria	3 acts	after Ippolito Zanelli's Nino	spring 1724	Naples, Teatro San Bartolomeo
Damiro e Pitia	opera seria		Domenico Lalli	12 October 1724	Munich
Siface	opera seria	3 acts	Metastasio	carnival 1725	Milan, Ducale
Didone abbandonata	opera seria	3 acts	Metastasio	Ascension 1725	Reggio Emilia, Pubblico
La verita nell'inganno	opera seria	3 acts	Francesco Silvani	carnival 1726	Milan, Regio Ducal
Meride e Selinunte	opera seria	3 acts	Apostolo Zeno	carnival 1726	Venice, Teatro San Giovanni Cristostomo
Siroe, re di Persia	opera seria	3 acts	Metastasio	February 1727	Rome, Teatro delle Dame
Arianna e Teseo (revised)	opera seria	3 acts	Pietro Pariati	autumn 1727	Venice, Teatro San Giovanni Cristostomo
Ezio	opera seria	3 acts	Metastasio? and Domenico Lalli	20 November 1728	Venice, Teatro San Giovanni Cristostomo
Semiramide riconosciuta	opera seria	3 acts	Metastasio, revised by Domenico Lalli?	carnival 1729, 20 January 1739	Venice, Teatro San Giovanni Cristostomo, revised for Naples, Teatro di San Carlo
Ermenegilda	opera seria			1729	Naples
Mitridate	opera seria	3 acts	Apostolo Zeno and Filippo Vanstryp	carnival 1730	Rome, Teatro Capranica
Tamerlano	opera seria	3 acts	Agostino Piovene, after Jacques Pradon	carnival 1730	Turin, Regio
Poro	opera seria	3 acts	after Metastasio's Alessandro nell'Indie	carnival 1731	Turin, Regio
Annibale	opera seria	3 acts	Filippo Vanstryp	autumn 1731	Venice, San Angelo
Germanico in Germania	opera seria	3 acts	Nicola Coluzzi	February 1732	Rome, Teatro Capranica
Issipile	opera seria	3 acts	Metastasio	carnival 1733	Rome, Rucellai
Arianna in Nasso	opera seria	3 acts	Paolo Antonio Rolli	29 December 1733	London, Lincoln's Inn Fields Theatre
Enea nel Lazio	opera seria	3 acts	Paolo Antonio Rolli	11 May 1734	London, Lincoln's Inn Fields Theatre
Polifemo	opera seria	3 acts	Paolo Antonio Rolli	1 February 1735	London, King's Theatre
Ifigenia in Aulide	opera seria	3 acts	Paolo Antonio Rolli, after Apostolo Zeno	3 May 1735	London, King's Theatre
Mitridate	opera seria	3 acts	Gavrado da Gavrado (pseudonym of Colley Cibber)	24 January 1736	London, King's Theatre
Orfeo	pasticcio with J. A. Hasse, F. M. Veracini & others	3 acts	Paolo Antonio Rolli	2 March 1736	London, King's Theatre
La festa d'Imeneo	componimento drammatico		Paolo Antonio Rolli	4 May 1736	London, King's Theatre
Lucio Papirio	opera seria	3 acts	Antonio Salvi, revised by Giovanni Boldoni	carnival 1737	Venice, San Cassiano
Rosbale	opera seria	3 acts	after Claudio Nicola Stampa's Eumene	autumn 1737	Venice, Teatro San Giovanni Cristostomo
Carlo il Calvo	opera seria	3 acts	anonymous	spring 1738	Rome, Teatro delle Dame
Il barone di Zampano	opera buffa		Pietro Trinchera	spring 1739	Naples, Teatro Nuovo
L'amico fedele	opera buffa		Giuseppe di Pietro	autumn 1739	Naples, Teatro dei Fiorentini
Intermezzo for the marriage of the Infante D Filippo				1739	Madrid
Il trionfo di Camilla	opera seria		Silvio Stampiglia	20 January 1740	Naples, Teatro San Carlo
Tiridate	opera seria	3 acts	after Metastasio's Zenobia	19 December 1740	Naples, Teatro San Carlo
Il trionfo del valore	comedia per musica		Antonio Palomba	winter 1741	Naples, Teatro Nuovo
Giascone	serenata?			1742	Naples
Statira	opera seria	3 acts	Francesco Silvani	carnival 1742	Venice, Teatro San Giovanni Cristostomo
Partenope	opera seria			1742	Naples
La Rosmene	opera seria	3 acts		1742	Vienna
Temistocle	opera seria	3 acts	Metastasio	22 February 1743	London, Haymarket Theatre
Le nozze d'Ercole e d'Ebe	opera seria			carnival 1744	Venice, Teatro San Giovanni Cristostomo
Filandro-Philander	opera seria	3 acts	after Vincenzo Cassani's L'incostanza schernita	18 July 1747	Dresden, Hof
Il trionfo di Camilla (second version)	opera seria		Silvio Stampiglia, revised by Giovanni Battista Lorenzi	30 May 1760	Naples, Teatro San Carlo
