= Semiramide riconosciuta (Porpora) =

1729 dramma per musica by Nicola Porpora

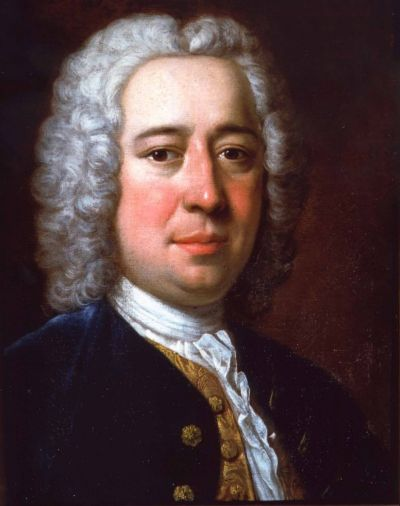
Nicola Antonio Porpora

Semiramide riconosciuta (Semiramis Recognized) is an Italian opera with serious action, or dramma per musica, by Nicola Porpora, set to a libretto by Metastasio with some textual changes, possibly by Domenico Lalli. The opera was written for some of the finest contemporary singers, and includes a technically demanding series of da capo arias.

== Performance history ==
The opera was first performed on 26 December 1729 at the Teatro San Giovanni Grisostomo in Venice. Metastasio's libretto had been used in Rome, on 6 February that same year, for another setting of the same title by Leonardo Vinci.

== Roles ==
Roles, voice types, premiere cast
Role	Voice type	Premiere cast, 26 December 1729
Semiramide, an Egyptian princess	soprano	Lucia Facchinelli
Merteo, an Egyptian prince, brother of Semiramide	soprano castrato	Carlo Maria Broschi "Farinelli"
Sibari, also formerly in love with Semiramide	alto castrato	Domenico Gizzi
Idreno/Scitalce, an Indian prince, former lover of Semiramide	soprano castrato	Nicolò Grimaldi "Nicolini"
Tamiri, princess of Bactria	soprano	Antonia "Anna" Negri
Ircano, a Scythian prince	bass	Giuseppe Maria Boschi

== Synopsis ==
The Egyptian princess Semiramide rules Assyria disguised as a man. Princess Tamiri prepares to choose a husband from three candidates, setting in motion a series of events that lead to Semiramide being reunited with her lover Scitalce, and the exposure of the villainy of his rival Sibari.

== Revivals and recordings ==
- Semiramide riconosciuta: Stefano Montanari at Le Festival International d’Opéra Baroque de Beaune
- Excerpts Carnevale 1729 Ann Hallenberg Montanari, Il pomo d'Oro Pentatone
