= L'Eraclea =

1724 opera by Leonardo Vinci

Eraclea
- Opera by Leonardo Vinci
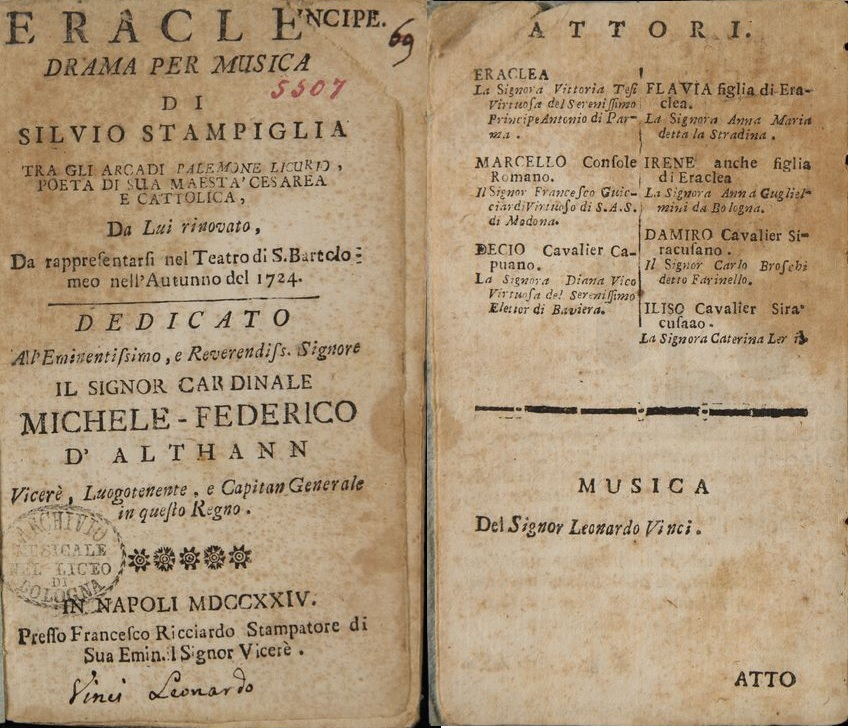
- Frontispiece and cast from the libretto of the 1724 Naples premiere of l'Eraclea by Leonardo Vinci
- Librettist: Silvio Stampiglia
- Language: Italian
- Premiere: 1 October 1724; Teatro San Bartolomeo, Naples

Eraclea ("Heraclea") is an opera (dramma per musica) composed by Leonardo Vinci on a libretto by Silvio Stampiglia.

It was first performed in Naples, at the Teatro San Bartolomeo on 1 October 1724.

The castrato Farinelli, then only 19 years old, sang one of his first roles in it.

== Roles ==
Roles, voice types, premiere cast
Role	Voice type	Premiere cast
Eraclea	contralto	Vittoria Tesi, aka La Moretta
Flavia Daughter of Eraclea	soprano	Anna Maria Strada, aka La Stradina
Marcello Roman consul	tenor	Francesco Guicciardi
Irene Other daughter of Eraclea	soprano	Anna Guglielmini
Decio Capuan knight	contralto	Diana Vico
Damiro Syracusan knight	castrato	Carlo Broschi, aka Farinelli
Iliso Syracusan knight	contralto	Caterina L[...]

== Recordings ==
- Io gelosa non sono... Il ruscelletto amante (Flavia, act I, sc.15)

on Amate Stelle - Arias For Anna Maria Strada: Marie Lys (soprano), Abchordis Ensemble, Andrea Buccarella. Glossa, GCD923536, 2023.

- Aprirti il seno (Iliso, act II, sc.4)

on Leonardo Vinci: Alto Arias: Filippo Mineccia (alto) & Francesca Cassinari (soprano), Stile galante, Stefano Aresi. Pan Classics, PC10297, 2014.

- In questa mia tempesta

on Leonardo Vinci: Alto Arias: Filippo Mineccia (alto) & Francesca Cassinari (soprano), Stile galante, Stefano Aresi. Pan Classics, PC10297, 2014.

and on Max Emanuel Cencic: Arie Napoletane: Max Emanuel Cencic (countertenor), Il Pomo D'Oro, Maxim Emelyanychev. Decca, 2015.
