= Gismondo, Re di Polonia =

1727 opera by Leonardo Vinci

Gismondo, Rè di Polonia
- Opera by Leonardo Vinci
- Frontispiece from the libretto of the 1727 Rome premiere of Gismondo, Rè di Polonia
- Librettist: Francesco Briani
- Language: Italian
- Premiere: 11 January 1727; Teatro delle Dame, Rome

Gismondo, rè di Polonia ossia il vincitor generoso ("Sigismund, King of Poland or the Generous Victor") is an opera (dramma per musica) whose libretto was written by Francesco Briani and with music composed by Leonardo Vinci.

It was first performed in Rome, at the Teatro delle Dame on 11 January 1727 as part of the festivities of the Carnival.

The original libretto, written for Lotti's opera of the same name, is an homage to Frederick IV of Denmark lauding monarchic values and diplomatic virtues. In the same spirit, Vinci's opera is dedicated to "Giacomo III, Rè della Gran Brettagna &c.", i.e. James Francis Edward Stuart.

== Synopsis ==
In order to put an end to their war, the king of Poland (Gismondo) and the duke of Lithuania (Primislao) are trying to negotiate a peace alliance in the form of a marriage between Otone (son of Gismondo) and Cunegonda (Primislao’s daughter) who happen to be in love. But when the peace process is sabotaged Primislao believes Gismondo responsible for his public humiliation and the war starts again. After a particularly violent battle Primislao is believed dead, leading Cunegonda to seek revenge on Otone. However it is revealed that Giuditta, Otone's sister, who, from the start, was secretly in love with Primislao, has rescued the latter and peace can now be made.

== Roles ==
The original cast were all castrati, as the opera was produced in Rome, where women were forbidden to appear on stage.

Roles, voice types, premiere cast
Role	Voice type	Premiere cast
Gismondo King of Poland	castrato	Giovanni Battista Minelli
Primislao Duke of Lituania	tenor	Antonio Barbieri
Otone Gismondo's son, Cunegonde's lover.	castrato	Filippo Balatri
Cunegonda Primislao's daughter. Otone's lover.	castrato soprano	Giacinto Fontana, aka Farfallino
Giuditta Gismondo's daughter. Primislao's lover.	castrato soprano	Giovanni Maria Morosi, aka Morosino
Ernesto Prince of Livonia, Giuditta's lover.	castrato	Giovanni Ossi
Ermano Prince of Moravia, General of Gismondo's army, also Giuditta's lover.	castrato	Giovanni Andrea Tassi

== Recordings ==
- Vinci, Leonardo: Gismondo, re di Polonia. Max Emanuel Cenčić (Gismondo), Yuriy Mynenko (Otone), Sophie Junker (Cunegonda), Aleksandra Kubas-Kruk (Primislao), Jake Arditti (Ernesto), Dilyara Idrisova (Giuditta), Nicholas Tamagna (Ermano), {oh!} Orkestra Historyczna, Martyna Pastuszka. Parnassus Arts, 2020.
