= Rosmira fedele =

Rosmira fedele may refer to:

- Partenope (Vinci) 1725
- Rosmira fedele, pasticcio by Vivaldi 1738
