= Felice Salimbeni =

Italian opera singer

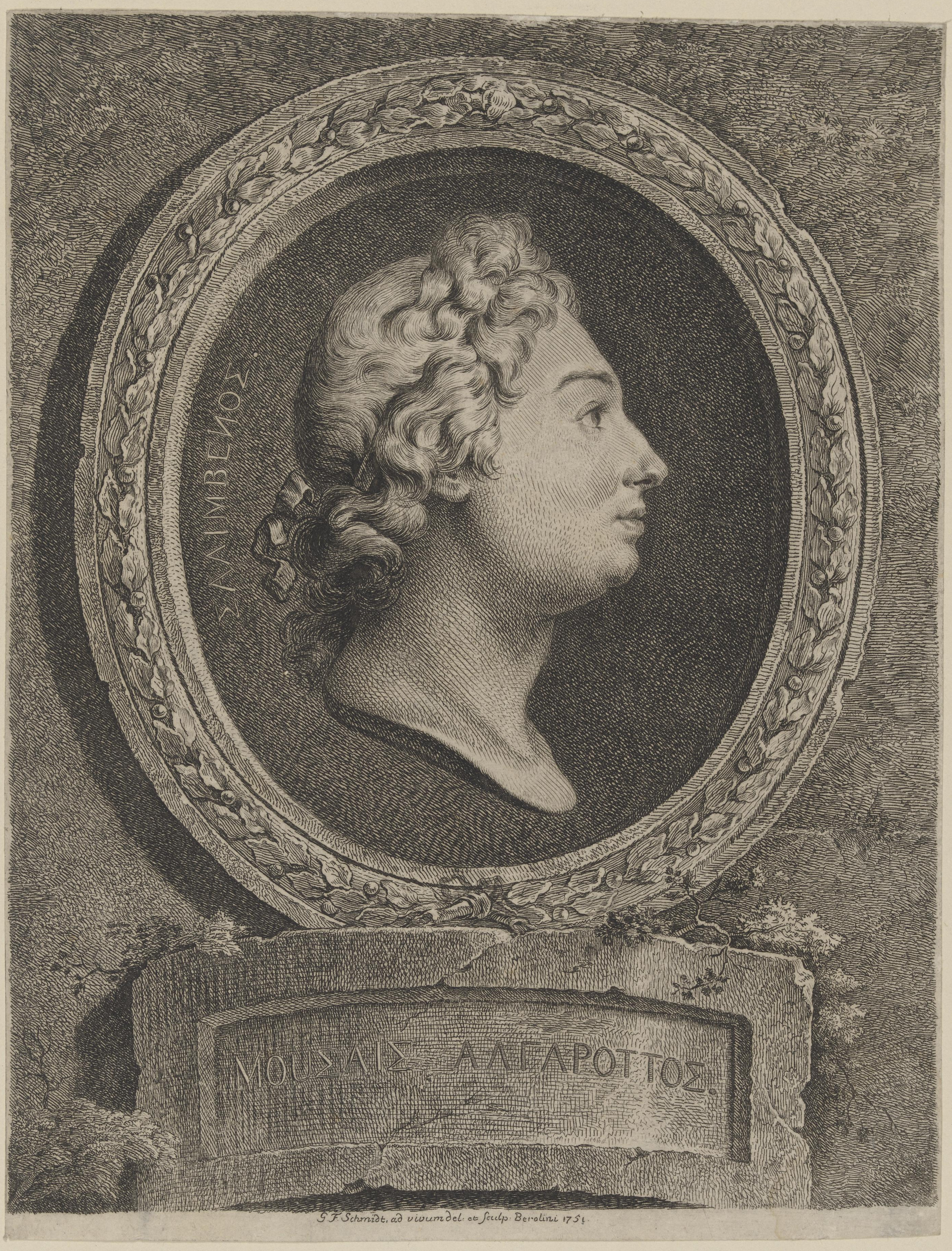
Portrait of Felice Salimbeni by Georg Friedrich Schmidt (1751)

Felice Salimbeni (c. 1712 - 16 October 1755) was an Italian castrato opera singer. Born in Milan, his singing teachers included Nicola Antonio Porpora and Christoph Schaffrath. He sang in venues in Rome, Vienna, Berlin and Dresden, singing the title parts in operas by Porpora and Antonio Caldara. He died in 1755 in the Slovenian town of Vrhnika, then part of the Habsburg monarchy.
