= Francesco Scarlatti =

Italian composer

Francesco Scarlatti (5 December 1666 – c.1741) was an Italian Baroque composer and musician and the younger brother of the better known Alessandro Scarlatti.

Francesco was ever to live under the shadow of his better known relatives, Alessandro Scarlatti (his elder brother) and his nephew, Domenico. However, Francesco himself was an accomplished musician and held a number of appointments.

== Biography ==
Scarlatti was born in Palermo, Sicily. Due to the island being under the control of the Kingdom of Naples, Francesco went to study at the well-known Conservatorio in the city. His first appointment, following his studies, was as a violinist at the Chapel Royal in Naples. His appointment was controversial: a number of Neapolitan musicians resented the young provincial's influence at court.

In 1690, he married Rosalina Albano who died in 1706 after having given birth to five children.

Francesco later travelled around Europe. He moved to London in 1719; some sources suggest that this was on the invitation of Handel, whom he had met some years before in Italy. Hardly anything is known of his time in London. It is thought that he probably worked in theatre orchestras. Scarlatti was recommended to James Brydges, 1st Duke of Chandos by John Arbuthnot. Chandos, a patron of Handel, maintained a musical establishment at his main house, Cannons in Middlesex, but Scarlatti appears not to have joined it.

At some point between 1724 and 1733 Francesco Scarlatti moved to Dublin, where he may have married a woman by the first name of Jane. A notice in Faulkner's Dublin Journal of 11 August 1733 disclaims debts incurred by her: "Jane Scarlatti, wife of Francis Scarlatti, Master of Musick, hath eloped from her said husband. This is to desire that nobody may give any credit to the said Jane Scarlatti on account of her said husband; for he will not pay any debts that she shall contract; nor answer any bills she may draw on him."

The last record of Francesco Scarlatti is in January 1741, when he was apparently unavailable for a concert due to ill-health. No further record remains of Scarlatti. It is believed that he died in Dublin shortly afterwards.

== Selected works ==
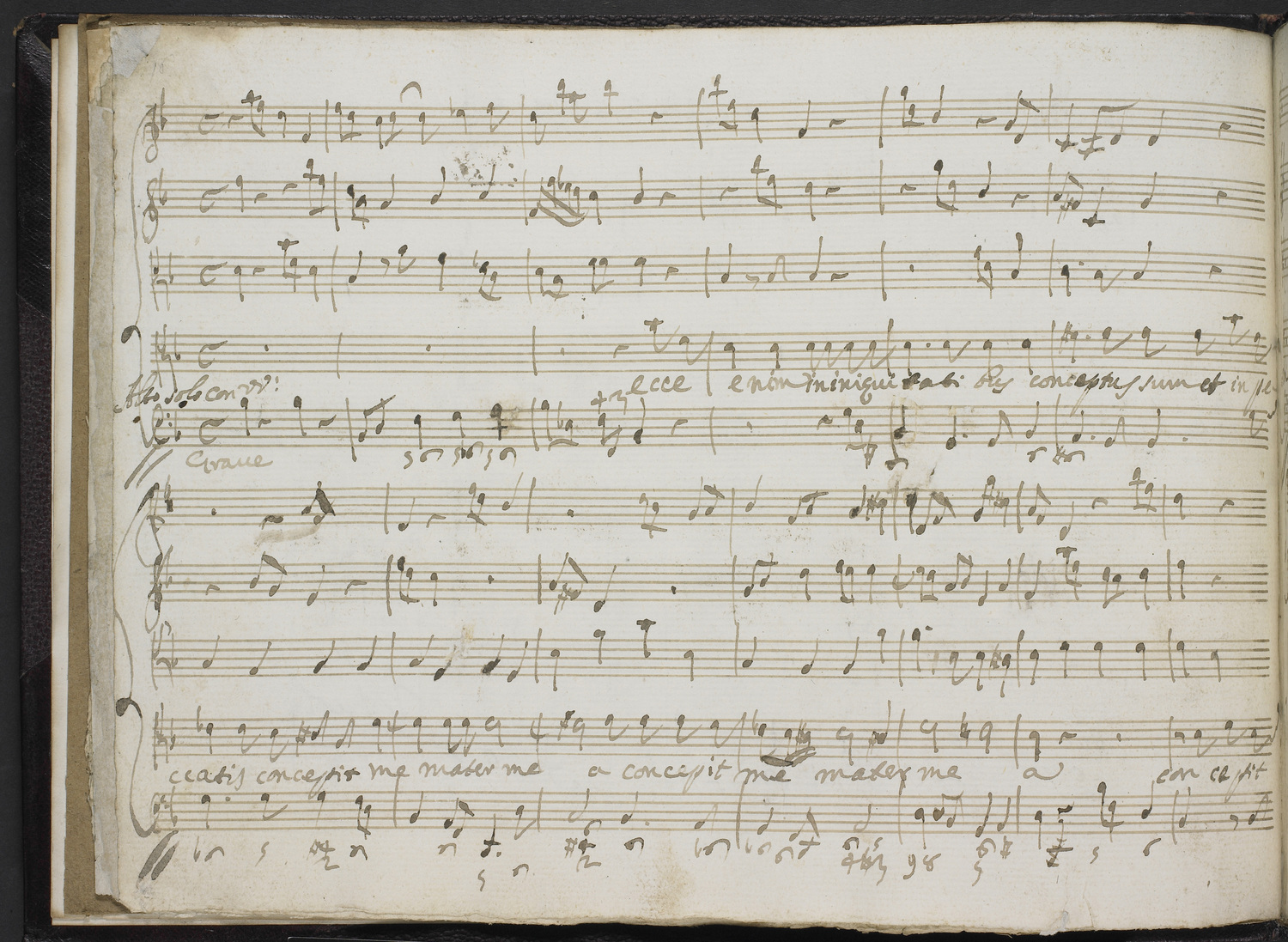
Autograph manuscript of Scarlatti's Miserere mei Deus

- Laetatus sum (Psalm 122) for SSATB with strings and continuo
- Dixit dominus (Psalm 110) for sixteen singers with orchestra (1702)
- Messa, Kyrie and Gloria mass for 16 singers with instruments (1703)
- Miserere (Psalm 51) for SSATB chorus with instruments (1714)

The autographed manuscripts for the "Messa" and "Dixit Dominus" are now at the Bodleian Library, Oxford. An authorized copy of the "Miserere" is kept in the Österreichische Nationalbibliothek, Vienna.

== Selected recordings ==
- Dixit Dominus, Mass, and Miserere (incomplete), performed by Emma Kirkby (soprano), Armonico Consort, Concerto Gallese, the English Cornett and Sackbutt Ensemble, Christopher Monks (conductor); Deux-Elles DXL 1096 (CD, 2004).
- Miserere mei, Deus (Psalm 50), performed by Ensemble Ex Tempore, Florian Heyerick (cond); Etcetera KTC 1298 (CD, 2005).
- five Concerti grossi for violin and orchestra, performed by Martyna Pastuszka (violin, conductor), Małgorzata Malke (violin), Orkiestra Historyczna, Muso mu-030 (CD, 2019).
- Dixit Dominus, Mass, performed by Armonico Consort, Christopher Monks (conductor); Signum Classics SIGCD 740 (CD, 2023).
