= Carlo il Calvo =

Opera seria by Nicola Porpora

Carlo il Calvo (Charles the Bald) is an opera seria in 3 acts by Nicola Porpora that premiered in the spring of 1738 at Rome's Teatro delle Dame.

== Recording ==
- 2022: Julia Lezhneva, Suzanne Jerosme, Max Emanuel Cenčić, Franco Fagioli, Bruno de Sá, Petr Nekoranec, Nian Wang, Armonia Atenea; conductor: George Petrou 3 CDs Parnassus
