= Tigrane (Scarlatti) =

Opera by Alessandro Scarlatti

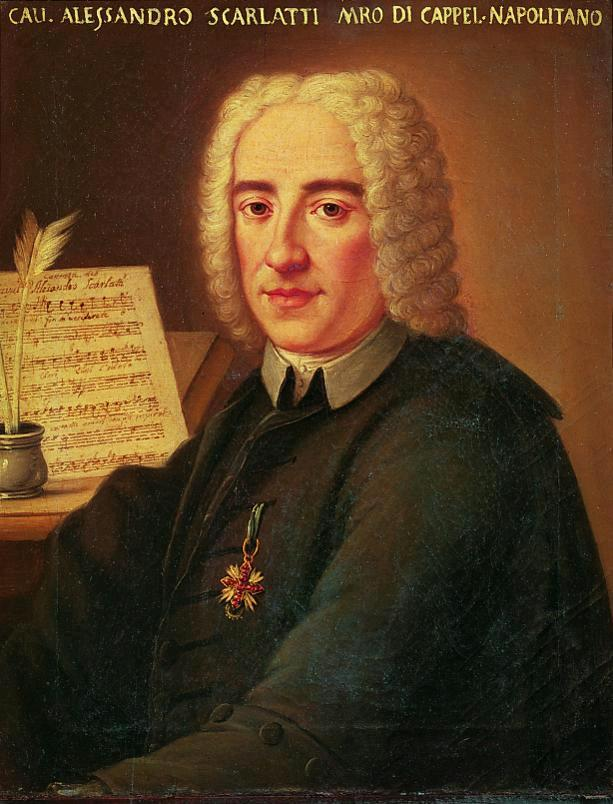
Alessandro Scarlatti

Tigrane, o vero L'egual impegno d'amore e di fede (Tigranes or The Equal Ties of Love and Faith) is an opera seria in three acts by the Italian composer Alessandro Scarlatti with a libretto by Domenico Lalli (loosely based on the Histories of Herodotus). It was first performed at the Teatro San Bartolomeo, Naples, on 16 February 1715. It is regarded as one of Scarlatti's finest operas. As well as the serious main plot, there are also comic scenes involving the servants Dorilla and Orcone.

== Roles ==
Roles, voice types, premiere cast
Cast	Voice type	Premiere cast, 16 February 1715
Tigrane, Prince of Armenia	soprano castrato	Nicolò Grimaldi, "Nicolini"
Tomiri, Queen of the Massagetae	soprano	Marianna Benti Bulgarelli, "la Romanina"
Meroe, daughter of the late King of Persia	soprano	Angiola Augusti
Policare, King of Lydia	contralto (en travesti)	Giovanna Albertini, "la Reggiana"
Doraspe, King of Damascus	tenor	Gaetano Borghi
Oronte, captain of Tomiri's guards	soprano castrato	Nicola Ippolito Cherubini
Dorilla, Tomiri's maid	contralto	Santa Marchesini
Orcone, a slave	bass	Gioacchino Corrado
The echo	soprano	Angiola Augusti

== Synopsis ==
=== Act 1 ===
Queen Tomiri (Tomyris in Herodotus) has two sons. One has been kidnapped and brought up as the Armenian prince, Tigrane. The other has been killed by Ciro, King of Persia. To avenge his death, Tomiri has fought and defeated Ciro with the aid of Policare and Doraspe. In return for their help, she has promised to marry one of them, but she is reluctant to come to a decision as she finds herself attracted to Tigrane, a commander in the allied army, unaware he is her son. Ciro's daughter, Meroe, is also in love with Tigrane and arrives at Tomiri's court in disguise, bent on avenging her father. Tomiri entrusts the choice of her husband to Tigrane, who says that whichever of the two kings can beat him in combat will win Tomiri's hand. Policare and Doraspe plot against Tigrane.

=== Act 2 ===
Tomiri reconciles the two kings and Tigrane. Meroe is about to kill Tomiri as she sleeps when she is prevented by Tigrane. Tigrane, surprised with Meroe's dagger in his hand, is accused of trying to murder Tomiri. Unwilling to reveal the truth, which would endanger Meroe, Tigrane is condemned to death.

=== Act 3 ===
As Tigrane faces execution, Meroe reveals her true identity. She is led away in chains and Tigrane is freed. The truth about Tigrane's parentage is finally discovered and Tomiri is reunited with her son. She pardons Meroe and allows her to marry Tigrane while the queen herself chooses Policare as her husband.

== Recordings ==
- Sinfonia, and arias "Il fiero aspetto", "Reo mi credi", "Esser degg'io come un scoglio" on Il Primo Uomo: Arias for Nicolini, sung by Dmitry Egorov with La Stagione Frankfurt, Michael Schneider DHM 2011
