= Nicholas Tamagna =

Opera Countertenor

Nicholas Tamagna (born July 30, 1982) is an Italian-American countertenor. He performs primarily in Baroque and contemporary opera and has appeared at venues including the Metropolitan Opera, San Francisco Opera, Theater an der Wien, the Israeli Opera, and the Bayreuth Baroque Opera Festival.

== Early life and education ==
Tamagna was born in Cortlandt Manor, New York, and holds dual Italian and American citizenship. In 2010, he was awarded first prize at the inaugural Nico Castel International Mastersinger Competition, presented by the New York Opera Studio and Distinguished Concerts International New York. The following year, he received the 2nd Jury Prize at the Arkadi Foundation Opera Competition.

== Career ==
=== Early career (2009–2019) ===
Tamagna's early career was based in New York. In 2009, he sang the title role in Handel's Giulio Cesare with Bel Cantanti Opera in Washington, D.C. The production was reviewed in The Washington Post and Opera Britannia.

In 2010, he sang the title role of Orpheus in Gluck's Orfeo ed Euridice with Opera Memphis, conducted by Michael Ching.

In 2011, he appeared as Farnace in the New York stage premiere of Mozart's Mitridate, re di Ponto with the Little Opera Theater of New York. The production was reviewed in The New York Times.

During the 2012–13 season, Tamagna performed the title role in Philip Glass's Akhnaten with Indianapolis Opera. The production was filmed and broadcast.

In 2013, he sang the title role in the North American premiere of Handel's Rodrigo with Operamission at the Gershwin Hotel in New York. The production received coverage in The New York Times, Opera Today, and The Classical Review.

In 2014, Tamagna began performing regularly in Europe. He sang Oronte in Handel's Riccardo Primo opposite Franco Fagioli at the Karlsruhe Händelfestspiele, at the Badisches Staatstheater Karlsruhe, conducted by Michael Hofstetter with the Deutsche Händel-Solisten. The production was revived in February 2015.

He subsequently appeared at the Oldenburgisches Staatstheater, where his roles included the Refugee in Jonathan Dove's Flight and the title role in Hasse's Siroe, Re di Persia, the latter a co-production with the Nederlandse Reisopera conducted by George Petrou. With the Nederlandse Reisopera, he also sang Tolomeo in Handel's Giulio Cesare.

In 2016, Tamagna sang Goffredo in Handel's Rinaldo with Operamission at Merkin Concert Hall. The performance was reviewed in The New York Times.

Tamagna developed an association with the French early music ensemble Le Poème Harmonique under Vincent Dumestre, performing in their Purcell/Shakespeare programme at the Philharmonie de Paris and recording the album Son of England (2017) on the Alpha Classics label.

In 2019, he sang Ruggiero in Handel's Alcina with the Lautten Compagney Berlin at the Händelfestspiele Halle, and Silvio in Handel's Il Pastor Fido at the Händelfestspiele Halle with {oh!} Orkiestra Historyczna and Parnassus Arts Productions. That same year, he sang Ottone in Monteverdi's L'incoronazione di Poppea with Florentine Opera.

=== Metropolitan Opera debut and international career (2020–present) ===
In February 2020, Tamagna made his Metropolitan Opera debut as Narciso in Handel's Agrippina, directed by David McVicar and conducted by Harry Bicket, alongside Joyce DiDonato in the title role. The production was broadcast in HD cinemas worldwide as part of the Met's Live in HD series.

In 2020 and 2023, Tamagna appeared at the Theater an der Wien in Vienna, singing Turrio in Hasse's Cajo Fabrizio and Casimiro in Caldara's Il Venceslao, both in productions directed by Max Emanuel Cencic.

In 2022, he sang Timagene in Leonardo Vinci's Alessandro nell'Indie at the Bayreuth Baroque Opera Festival, directed by Max Emanuel Cencic. The production was broadcast on ARTE and BR Klassik. That same year, he sang Tolomeo in Handel's Giulio Cesare and Adalberto in Handel's Ottone at the Göttingen International Handel Festival, and the title role of Ruggiero in Vivaldi's Orlando furioso RV 819 at the Konzerthaus Dortmund, conducted by George Petrou. He also performed Apollo in Albinoni's Il nascimento dell'aurora at the Bayreuth Baroque Opera Festival.

In 2023, Tamagna made his Australian debut in the title role of Legrenzi's Giustino with Pinchgut Opera in Sydney. That same year, he sang Polinesso in Handel's Ariodante at the Israeli Opera in Tel Aviv, conducted by Jean-Christophe Spinosi in a production directed by David McVicar.

In 2024, he made his San Francisco Opera debut as Armindo in Handel's Partenope, directed by Christopher Alden. Later that year, he sang Hamor in Handel's Jephtha at the Elbphilharmonie in Hamburg with Concerto Köln. He also returned to the Israeli Opera as Orfeo in Gluck's Orfeo ed Euridice, directed by Yehezkel Lazarov.

Tamagna has also been engaged as a cover artist at the Vienna State Opera and the Salzburg Festival.

== Repertoire ==
Tamagna's repertoire centres on Baroque opera, particularly the works of Handel, in which he has sung more than 20 roles including Giulio Cesare, Ruggiero (Alcina), Orlando (Orlando), Rodrigo (Rodrigo), Armindo (Partenope), Tolomeo (Giulio Cesare), Narciso (Agrippina), Goffredo (Rinaldo), Adalberto (Ottone), Oronte (Riccardo Primo), Polinesso (Ariodante), and Silvio (Il Pastor Fido).

He has also performed in operas by Gluck (Orfeo ed Euridice), Vivaldi (Orlando furioso), Monteverdi (L'incoronazione di Poppea), Hasse (Siroe, Cajo Fabrizio), Caldara (Il Venceslao), Leonardo Vinci (Alessandro nell'Indie, Gismondo), Legrenzi (Giustino), Albinoni (Il nascimento dell'aurora), and Gassmann (L'opera seria), as well as contemporary works including Glass (Akhnaten) and Dove (Flight, Itch).

== Discography ==
=== Audio recordings ===
Year	Title	Role / Contribution	Label	Notes
2017	Son of England: Music of Henry Purcell and John Blow	Alto soloist	Alpha Classics	With Le Poème Harmonique, Les Cris de Paris, cond. Vincent Dumestre
2019	Ring Out (Jessica Meyer)	Countertenor	Bright Shiny Things	Debuted at No. 1 on the Billboard Traditional Classical Chart.
2019	Where Should This Music Be? Songs of Lola Williams	Countertenor	New World Records (NW 80818)	World premiere recording. Winner of The American Prize, Ernst Bacon Memorial Award (2019).
2020	Gismondo, re di Polonia (Leonardo Vinci)	Ermano	Parnassus Arts Productions	World premiere recording. 3-CD set. Named to the Bestenliste (Quarterly Critics' Choice) of the Preis der deutschen Schallplattenkritik. Nominated for Opus Klassik 2021 (Orchestra/Ensemble of the Year).
2023	Un'alma innamorata (Raphael Fusco)	Countertenor	Pentatone	World premiere recording. Cantata commissioned by Tamagna. With I Porporini, cond. Gerd Amelung.
2024	DONNE ALL'OPERA	Soloist	Arion Music	With Vivica Genaux, Francesca Ascioti, ENEA Barock Orchestra, cond. Valeria Montanari
2024	Sultans of the Opera (Dream of the Orient)	Soloist	MCY-Music	With Pera Ensemble

=== Video recordings ===
Year	Title	Role	Format	Notes
2015	Dido and Aeneas (Purcell)	The Spirit	DVD (Outhere Music)	With Le Poème Harmonique, cond. Vincent Dumestre
2020	Agrippina (Handel)	Narciso	Met Opera HD Live (cinema broadcast)	Metropolitan Opera. Cond. Harry Bicket
2022	Alessandro nell'Indie (Leonardo Vinci)	Timagene	ARTE / BR Klassik (television broadcast)	Bayreuth Baroque Opera Festival

== Teaching ==
Tamagna has served as a guest teacher at the Baroque Vocal Academy at the University of Mainz and has given masterclasses at institutions in Europe and the United States.
