= Diana Vico =

Italian opera singer

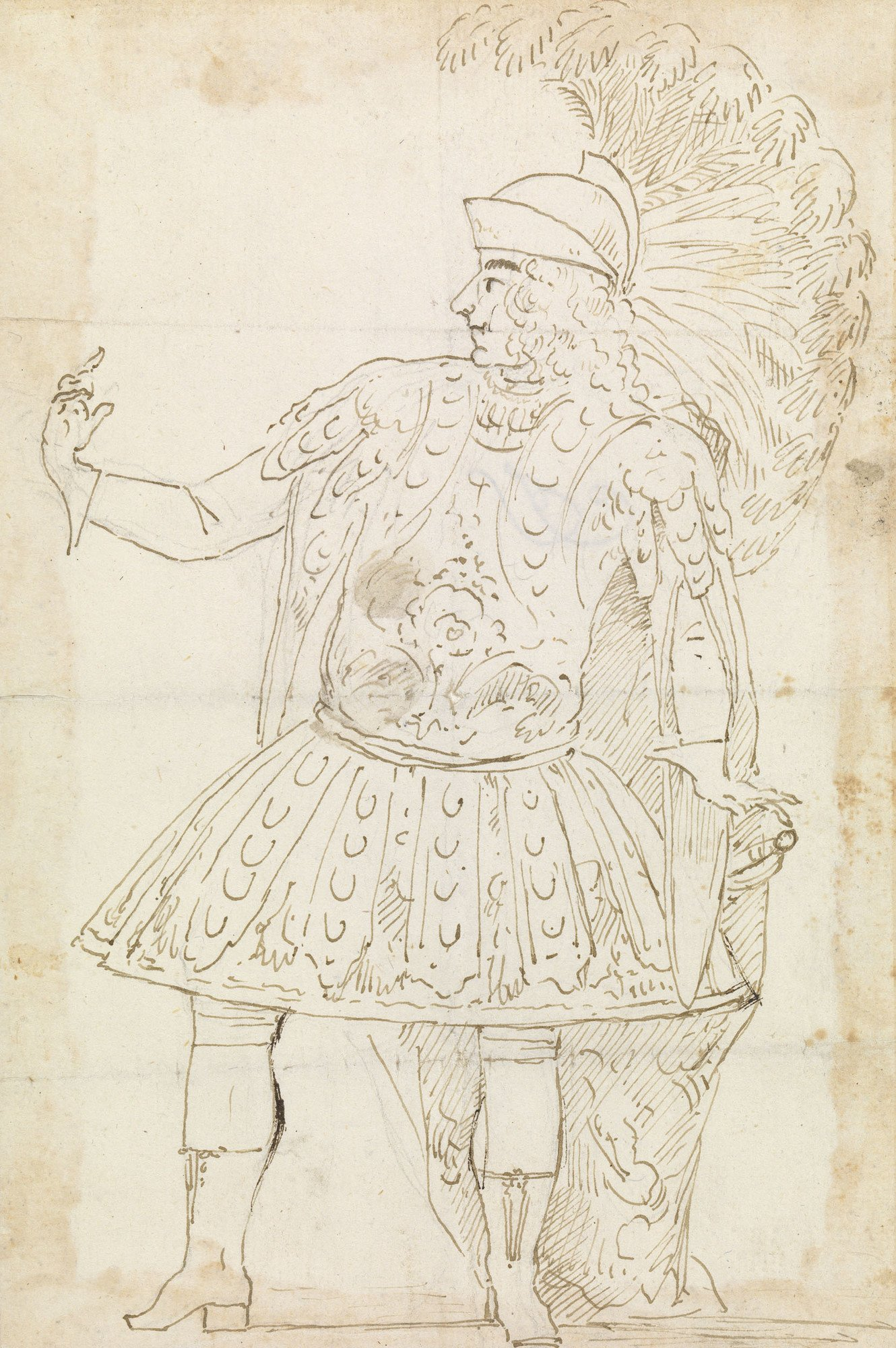
Caricature of Diana Vico by Antonio Maria Zanetti

Diana Vico was an 18th-century Italian contralto who had an active performance career in Europe from 1707 through 1732. Performing primarily in operas, she sang in opera houses in Italy, Germany, and England. She specialized in portraying male characters on stage, and appeared in the world premieres of operas by prominent composers of the Baroque period, including works by Antonio Vivaldi and George Frideric Handel among others.

== Life and career ==
Born in Venice sometime in the latter part of the 17th century, the years of Diana Vico's birth and death are not known. She began performing professionally as an opera singer in Venice in 1707; making her debut in Girolamo Polani’s Vindice la pazzia della vendetta. She performed in operas periodically in her native city for the next 19 years, and by 1726 had performed 26 roles on the Venetian opera stage in works by such composers as Francesco Gasparini, Antonio Lotti, Giuseppe Maria Orlandini, Carlo Francesco Pollarolo, Antonio Pollarolo, and Giovanni Porta. Her final opera performance in Venice was in Nicola Porpora’s Meride e Selinunte.

Other Italian cities in which Vico appeared in operas included Verona(1708), Ferrara (1711), Padua (1712 and 1718), Mantua (1714), Bologna (1718 and 1721), Genoa (1718 and 1724), Florence (1718–19), Turin (1719), Reggio nell’Emilia (1718–20), Modena (1720) and Milan (1720, 1722, 1726, 1729 and 1732). She notably created the title role of Ottone in the world premiere of Antonio Vivaldi’s Ottone in villa at the Teatro delle Grazie in Vicenza on 17 May 1713. From 1724 through 1726, she was primarily active as an opera singer in Naples; appearing in nine operas.

Outside of Italy, Vico was a resident artist of the King's Theatre in London from 1714 to 1716. She made her debut there in the pastiche Ernelinda. She had success in several operas by George Frideric Handel, including portraying the title role in a revival of Rinaldo (1714) and creating the role of Dardano in the world premiere of Amadigi di Gaula (1715). Her penchant for crossing and challenging gender lines both on and off stage, led the London impresario Owen Swiny to dismiss her as "some He-she-thing or other". She was engaged by Maximilian II Emanuel, Elector of Bavaria for performances at the Bavarian court in 1720, and returned frequently to Munich over the next decade.

After performances in Milan in 1732, there is no further known record of her activities and whereabouts.
