= Emanuele d'Astorga =

Italian composer

- Born: 20 March 1680; Augusta, Kingdom of Sicily
- Died: 1757 (aged 76–77); Madrid, Kingdom of Spain
- Occupation: Italian composer

Emanuele Gioacchino Cesare Rincon, baron of Astorga (20 March 1680 – 1757, by one report) was an Italian composer known mainly for his Stabat Mater.

== Biography ==
He was born on 20 March 1680 in Augusta, Sicily. No authentic account of Astorga's life can be successfully constructed from the obscure and confusing evidence that has been until now handed down, although historians have not failed to indulge many pleasant conjectures. According to Volkmann, his father, a baron of Sicily, took an active part in the attempt to throw off the Spanish yoke, but was betrayed by his own soldiers and publicly executed. His wife and son were compelled to be spectators of his fate; and such was the effect upon them that his mother died on the spot, and Emanuele fell into a state of gloomy despondency, which threatened to deprive him of reason. By the kindness of the Princess of Ursini, the unfortunate young man was placed in a convent at Astorga, in León, where he completed a musical education which is said to have been begun in Palermo under Francesco Scarlatti. Here, he recovered his health, and his admirable musical talents were cultivated under the best masters. On the details of this account no reliance can safely be placed, nor is there any certainty that in 1703, he entered the service of the Duke of Parma.

Equally untrustworthy is the story that the duke, suspecting an attachment between his niece Elizabeth Farnese and Astorga, dismissed the musician. The established facts concerning Astorga are indeed few enough. They are: that the opera Dafne was written and conducted by the composer in Barcelona in 1709; that he visited London, where he wrote his Stabat Mater, possibly for the society of "Antient Musick"; that it was performed in Oxford in 1713; that in 1712, he was in Vienna. Around 1723, he was in Lisbon, where in 1726, he published Cantate da camera, his only published piece, and that he retired at an uncertain date to Bohemia. According to the Encyclopædia Britannica Eleventh Edition, he died on 21 August 1736, in a castle which had been given to him in the domains of Prince Lobkowicz, in Roudnice. However, according to a manuscript in the Santini collection in Münster he died in 1757 in Madrid.

Emanuele d'Astorga is known for his Stabat Mater and for his numerous chamber cantatas for one or two voices. His chamber works are often associated with the tradition of Italian chamber cantatas developed by Alessandro Scarlatti, and he is regarded by some music historians as among the later composers to continue that tradition.
