= Ottone in villa =

Opera by Antonio Vivaldi

- Opera by Antonio Vivaldi
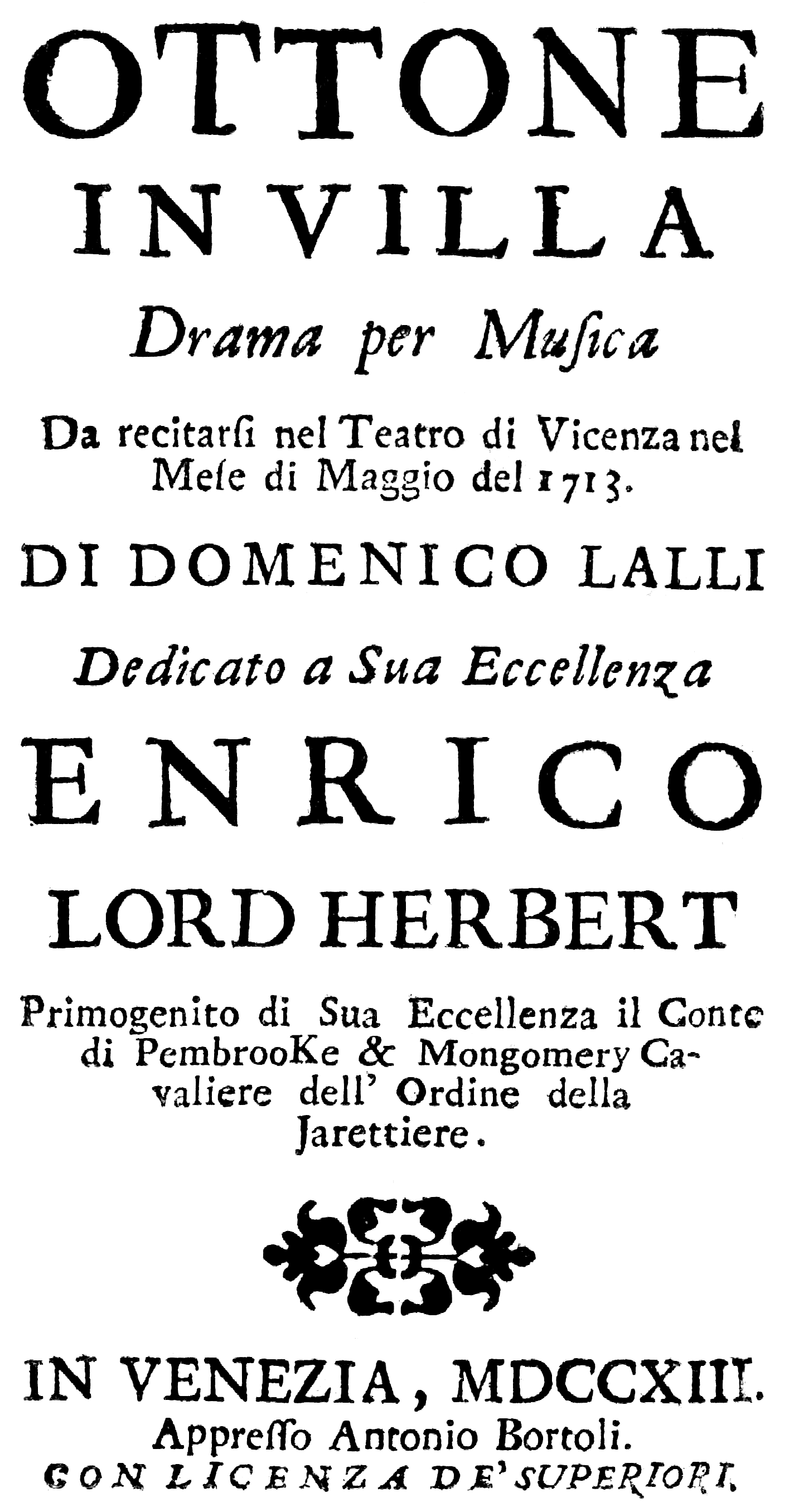
- Title page of the libretto, 1713, dedication to Henry Herbert, 9th Earl of Pembroke
- Librettist: Domenico Lalli
- Language: Italian
- Premiere: 17 May 1713; Teatro delle Grazie, Vicenza

Ottone in villa (Otho at his villa, RV 729) is an opera in three acts by Antonio Vivaldi to an Italian libretto by Domenico Lalli (the pseudonym of Sebastiano Biancardi). It was Vivaldi's first opera and premiered on 17 May 1713 at the Teatro delle Garzerie in Vicenza. Lalli's pastoral drama is set in ancient Rome and was a condensed adaptation of Francesco Maria Piccioli's satirical libretto for Carlo Pallavicino's opera Messalina (1679). However, Lalli changed several of the characters in Piccioli's libretto. Messalina became an invented character, Cleonilla. The Roman Emperor Claudius became another emperor, Otho (Ottone), who had already appeared as a protagonist in Monteverdi's L'incoronazione di Poppea (1642) and in Handel's Agrippina (1709).

== Roles ==
Roles, voice types, premiere cast
Role	Voice type	Premiere cast, 17 May 1713
Cleonilla	soprano	Anna Maria Giusti "La Romanina"
Ottone	contralto (en travesti)	Diana Vico
Caio Silio	soprano castrato	Bartolomeo Bartoli
Decio	tenor	Gaetano Mossi
Tullia (in disguise as "Ostilio")	soprano	Margherita Fazzoli

== Synopsis ==
The Roman Emperor Ottone is in love with Cleonilla, who can't resist flirting with two young Romans, Ostilio and Caio. Ostilio is in reality a woman, Tullia, who disguised herself because she's in love with Caio. She plans to kill Cleonilla out of jealousy, but she first tries to dissuade her from her relation with Caio. Caio sees the meeting and misinterprets it as a romantic encounter. He warns Ottone, who commands him to kill Ostilio. Before he can execute the order, Ostilio reveals himself to be Tullia. Cleonilla claims to have always known it, to conciliate Ottone. He believes her and the opera closes with the marriage of Tullia and Caio.

== Recordings ==
- Vivaldi: Ottone in Villa – Patrizia Pace (Cleonilla, soprano), Anna Maria Ferrante (Tullia, soprano), Aris Christofellis (Caio, male soprano), Jean Nirouët (Ottone, countertenor), Luigi Petroni (Decio, tenor); Ensemble Seicentonovecento; Flavio Colusso (conductor). Recorded September 1993. Label: Bongiovanni 10016/18.
- Vivaldi: Ottone in Villa – Susan Gritton (Cleonilla, soprano), Monica Groop (Ottone, mezzo-soprano), Nancy Argenta (Caio Silio, soprano), Mark Padmore (Decio, tenor), Sophie Daneman (Tullia, soprano); Collegium Musicum 90; Richard Hickox (conductor). Performing Edition (1997) by Eric Cross. Label: Chandos Chaconne 0614.
- Vivaldi: Ottone in Villa – Maria Laura Martorana (Cleonilla, soprano), Tuva Semmingsen (Ottone, mezzo-soprano), Florin Cezar Ouatu (Caio Silio, countertenor), Luca Dordolo (Decio, tenor), Marina Bartoli (Tullia, soprano); L'Arte dell'Arco; Federico Guglielmo (conductor). Performing edition by Federico Guglielmo (2008 revision) from the manuscript by Vittorio Bolcato. Label: Brilliant Classics 94105.
- Vivaldi: Ottone in Villa – Veronica Cangemi (Cleonilla, soprano), Roberta Invernizzi (Tullia, soprano), Julia Lezhneva (Caio, soprano), Sonia Prina (Ottone, contralto), Topi Lehtipuu (Decio, tenor); Il Giardino Armonico; Giovanni Antonini (conductor). Performing edition by Eric Cross. Label: Naïve B004215TO0. (2010)
