= Martyna Pastuszka =

Polish violinist

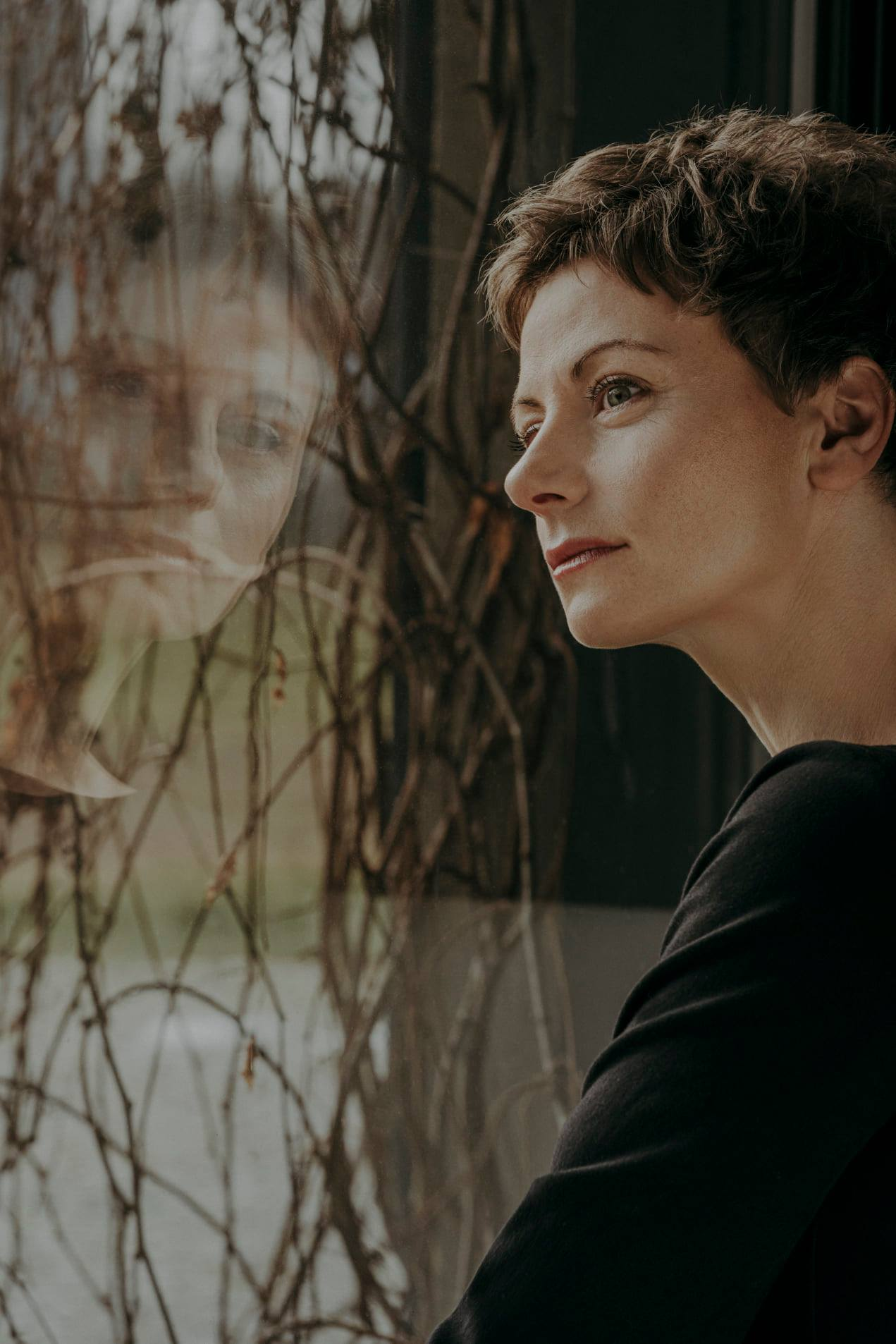
- Born: 1980 (age 45–46); Ruda Śląska, Poland
- Occupations: Musician, lecturer, concertmaster

Martyna Pastuszka (born 1980) is a Polish violinist, concertmaster, chamber musician, academic lecturer and orchestra leader.

== Career ==
Martyna Pastuszka was born in 1980 in Ruda Śląska, Poland to a family of musicians: her grandfather was an avid mandolinist, while her father was a professional hornist who worked with the Silesian Philharmonic. She studied contemporary violin at the Karol Szymanowski Academy of Music in Katowice (Roland Orlik's class), graduating in 2004.

In 2001, she started working with the then leading Polish Baroque band Arte dei Suonatori and pursued a career as a chamber musician. In the following years, she worked with Le Concert de la Loge, Concerto Copenhagen, Collegium 1704, Hofkapelle München, Capella Cracoviensis, Le Parlement de Musique, Le Concert Lorrain, Collegium Marianum, and others.

In 2012, Pastuszka founded {oh!} Orkiestra, an ensemble focused on baroque, historical opera and oratorio repertoire. It became the first professional orchestra in Silesia playing historical instruments and rose to international prominence. In 2019, the orchestra released Leonardo Vinci’s ‘Gismondo, Re di Polonia’, which was awarded the ‘Preis der deutschen Schallplattenkriti’. {oh!} Orkiestra cooperates with the most important Polish institutions and festivals. By 2020, {oh!} Orkiestra had released five studio albums, performed extensively in Poland and abroad, and received two nominations to the Fryderyk award.

Since 2007, she teaches baroque violin at her alma mater, Karol Szymanowski Academy of Music. In 2017, she defended there her doctoral thesis on Johann Friedrich Schreyfogel.

For three years in a row (2019, 2020, 2021), she was nominated for the prestigious Koryfeusz Muzyki Polskiej award in the “Personality of the Year”.

A documentary dedicated to Pastuszka and her {oh!} Orkiestra was released by public Polish television TVP Kultura in 2021. Through the years, such international stars as Vincent Dumestre, Barthold Kuijken and Lorenzo Coppola, had led the orchestra.

In 2022, Pastuszka served as an artistic director of the Misteria Paschalia festival in Kraków.

In 2023, she started a collaboration with Theodor Currentzis’s Utopia Orchestra. In the same year, she received a prestigious Coryphaeus of Polish Music award.

Her credits include more than 60 albums, 10 of them as a soloist. As a conductor, she worked with the Klaipeda Chamber Orchestra, Sinfonia Iuventus, and Polish Chamber Opera. Pastuszka is a resident artist to the Bayreuth Baroque Opera Festival and serves as artistic director-in-residence at the Misteria Paschalia Festival.
