= Ifigenia in Tauride (Vinci) =

18th century opera by Leonardo Vinci

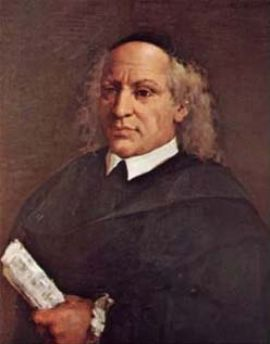
Leonardo Vinci

Ifigenia in Tauride is an opera in five acts composed by Leonardo Vinci to a libretto by Benedetto Pasqualigo. It premiered on 26 December 1724 at the Teatro San Giovanni Grisostomo in Venice, with Faustina Bordoni in the title role. The opera was Vinci's first success in Venice and his only five-act opera.
