= Pera Ensemble =

The Pera Ensemble (founded 2005) is a Turkish early music group specializing in music of the Ottoman Empire. The group was founded by oud player Mehmet Cemal Yeşilçay (b. 1965) and psaltery player Mehmet İhsan Özer (b. 1961). The name "Pera" comes from the old Greek name (literally "across") of the cosmopolitan Beyoğlu district on the European side of Istanbul, Turkey. The instrumental ensemble includes oud, qanun, kemençe, and European medieval and baroque instruments: viola d'amore, viola da gamba, theorbo, shawm, and percussion.

The ensemble has a wide circle of collaborators. Mehmet Cemal Yeşilçay himself is also known as a member of the German-Turkish ensemble Sarband. The Pera Ensemble regularly performs and records with the German L'arte del mondo baroque ensemble, founded in 2004 and led by Werner Erhardt. Although it does not include permanent singers, Yeşilçay's ensemble has invited guest singers such as Ahmet Özhan (b. 1941) a renowned Turkish traditional music singer. Their collaboration with Romanian-born German countertenor Valer Barna-Sabadus (b. 1986) won a special "Klassik Ohne Grenzen" prize at the German Echo Klassik Awards in 2012. A larger project, co-funded by the Turkish and German governments, includes Sufi, Sephardic and Armenian cantors and choirs in reconstructions of Muslim, Jewish, and Christian music of the Ottoman Empire.

== Discography ==
- Café - Orient meets Occident. Compositions by Italian baroque composers, Geldi cevher tiğ-i ateş bağrına ayineden (Eviç Karçe) tr:Eyyübi Bekir Ağa (1685-1759), Murad IV (1612-1640). Valer Barna-Sabadus. Berlin Classics 2012
- Amor Oriental - Händel alla turca Juanita Lascarro (soprano, Colombia), Florin Cezar Ouatu (countertenor, Romania), Ahmet Özhan. Arte del Mondo, Erhardt. DHM 2012.
- Baroque Oriental - Compositions by Sufi composers, and Ali Ufkî (born Wojciech Bobowski), Angelo Michele Bartolotti. Valer Barna-Sabadus. Berlin Classics 2012.
- One God - Jewish, Muslim and Christian compositions from Constantinople. Ludi Musici 2011
- Harem - Les Fêtes du Sérailles - Christian Cannabich's ballet for prince Carl Theodor of Mannheim, recreated in the Schlosstheater Schwetzingen. With other music alla Turca by Mozart. L'arte del mondo, Werner Erhardt. Ludi Musici 2007.
