= Giovanni Porta =

Italian composer (c. 1675–1755)

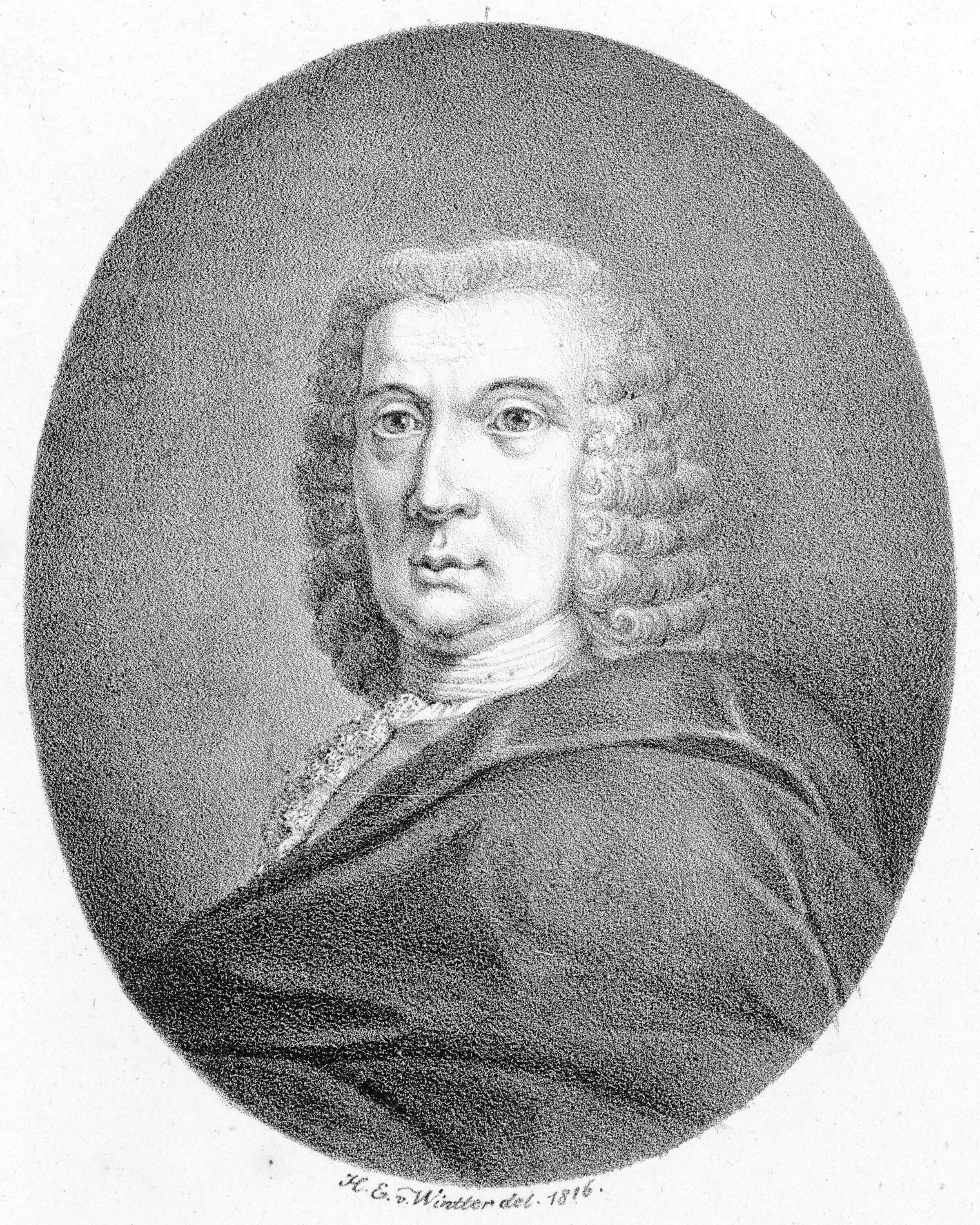
Giovanni Porta

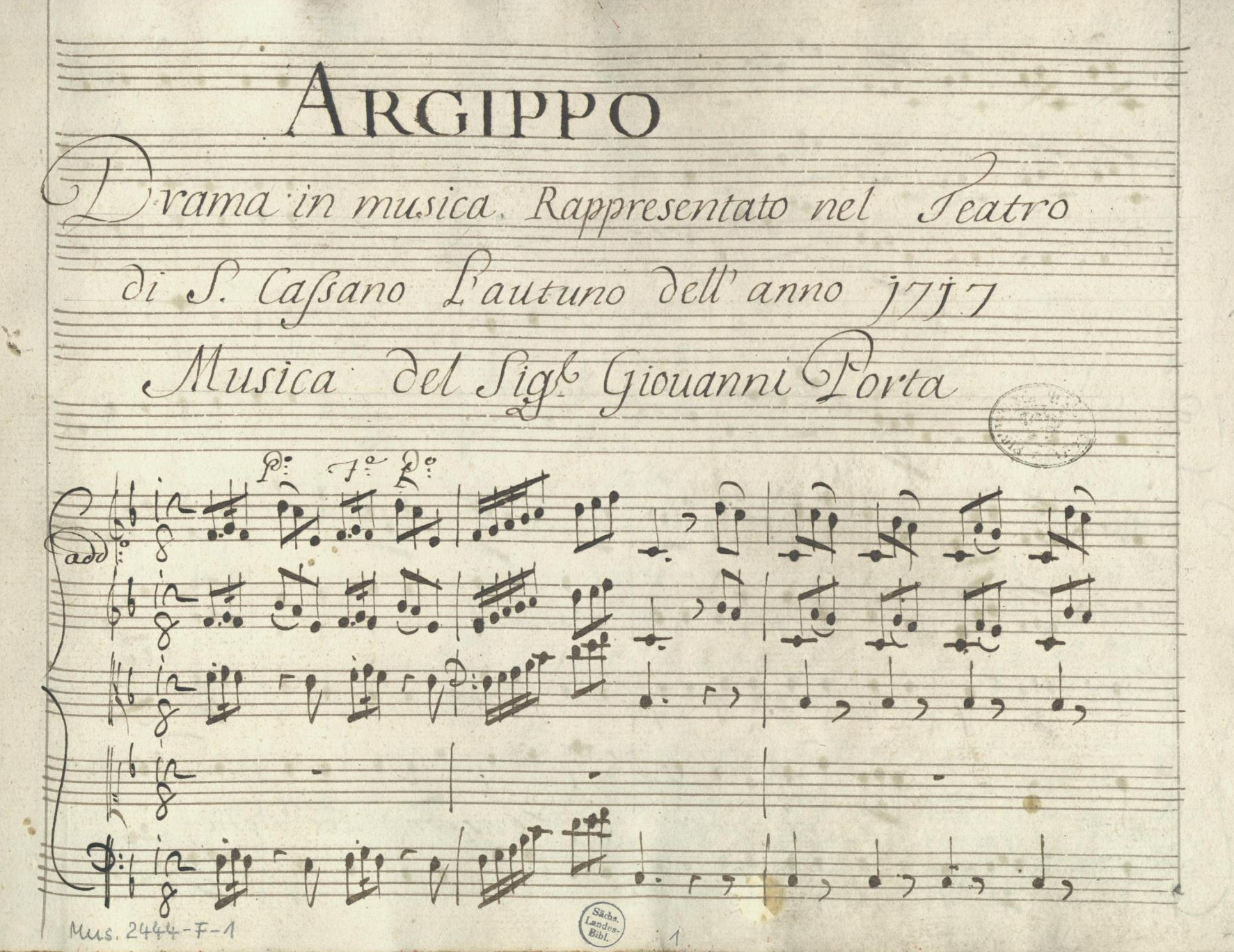
First page of Porta's Argippo score.

Giovanni Porta (c. 1675 – 21 June 1755) was an Italian opera composer. His opera Argippo, to a libretto by Domenico Lalli, was premiered in Venice in 1717.

Porta is believed to have been born in Venice. One of the masters of early 18th-century opera and one of the leading Venetian musicians, Porta made his way from Rome, to Vicenza, to Verona, then London where his opera Numitore was performed in 1720 by the Royal Academy of Music (1719), and eventually back to Venice and Verona, and finally Munich, where he spent the last 18 years of his life.

== Selected recordings ==
- Aria Madre diletta (from Ifigenia in Aulide) on Drama Queens Joyce DiDonato Alan Curtis (conductor) Virgin Classics 2012
- Aria Mormorando quelle fronde (from La costanza combattuta in amore) on Venezia recital Max Cencic Virgin Classics 2013
- Sinfonia for trumpet, strings & continuo in D on Il Diario di Chiara Europa Galante and Fabio Biondi Glossa Music 2014
