= Partenope (Vinci) =

1725 opera by Leonardo Vinci

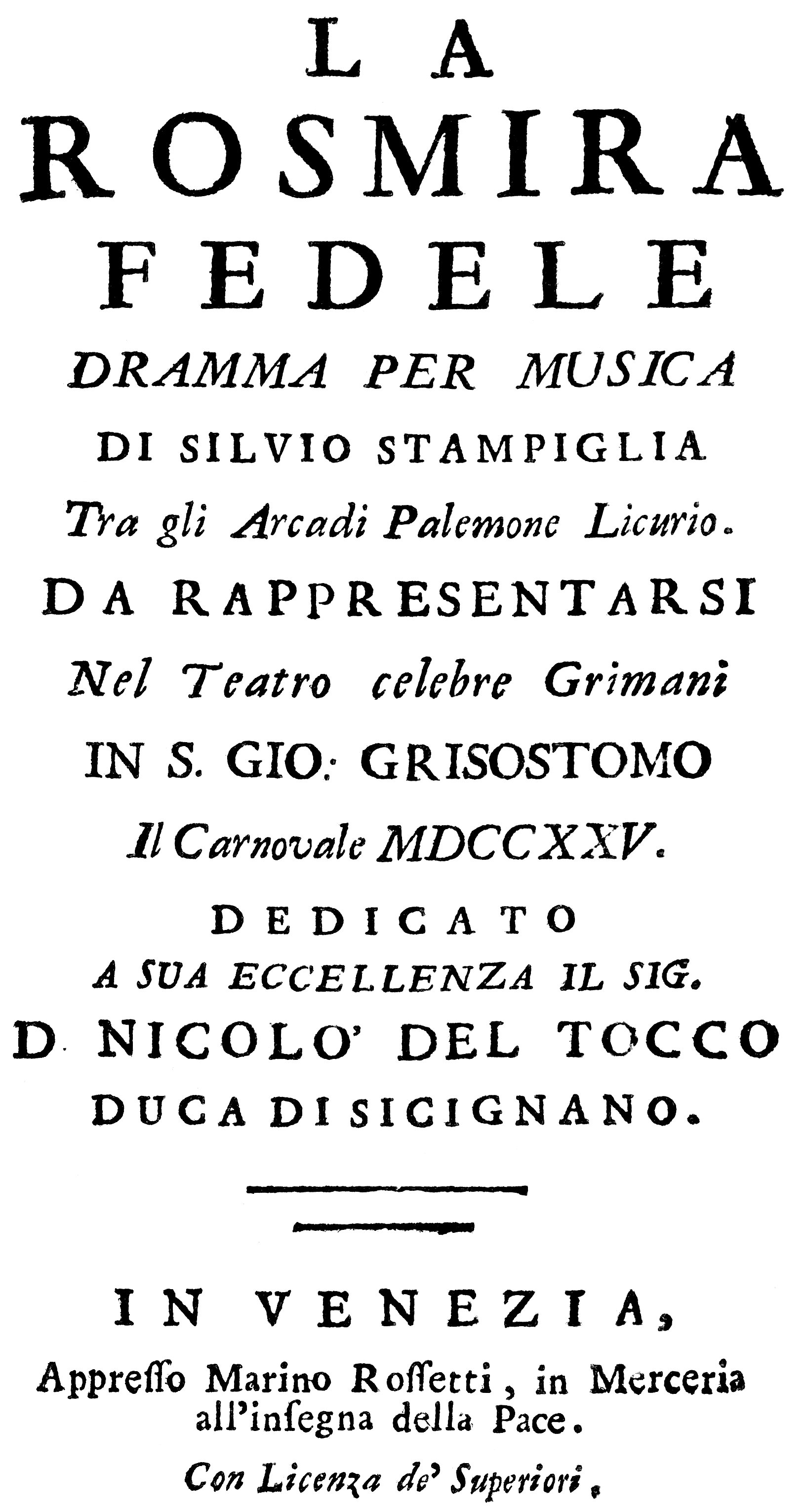

La Rosmira fedele, also known in modern revivals as Partenope, is a 1725 opera by Leonardo Vinci. It is largely based on Domenico Sarro's 1707 setting of Silvio Stampiglia's libretto Partenope but with new arias by Vinci. It was premiered 31 January with Antonia Merighi as Queen Partenope and Faustina Bordoni as Rosmira. Vivaldi set Stampiglia's libretto as a pasticcio Rosmira Fedele in 1738 using arias by Handel, Hasse, Pergolesi, and minor local Venetian composers.

== Recording ==
- Partenope Sonia Prina, Maria Grazia Schiavo, Maria Ercolano, Eufemia Tufano, Stefano Ferrari, Antonio Florio, Dynamic 2DVD 2013
