= Leonardo Vinci =

Italian opera composer (1690–1730)

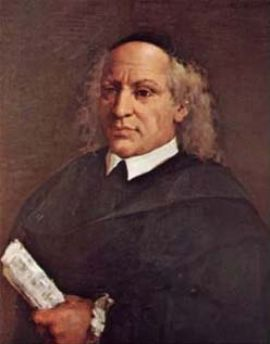
- Portrait of Vinci, perhaps a late 18th/early 19th-century copy (Note: See note 51 in Markstrom (2007, pp. 341–342) for discussion on the uncertainty surrounding the portrait.)
- Born: Leonardo Vinci; 1690; Strongoli, Kingdom of Sicily
- Died: 27 May 1730 (aged 39–40); Naples
- Occupation: Composer

Leonardo Vinci (1690 – 27 May 1730) was an Italian Baroque composer known chiefly for his 40 or so operas. Comparatively little of his work in other genres survives. A central proponent of the Neapolitan School of opera, his influence on subsequent opera composers such as Johann Adolph Hasse and Giovanni Battista Pergolesi was considerable.

== Life and career ==
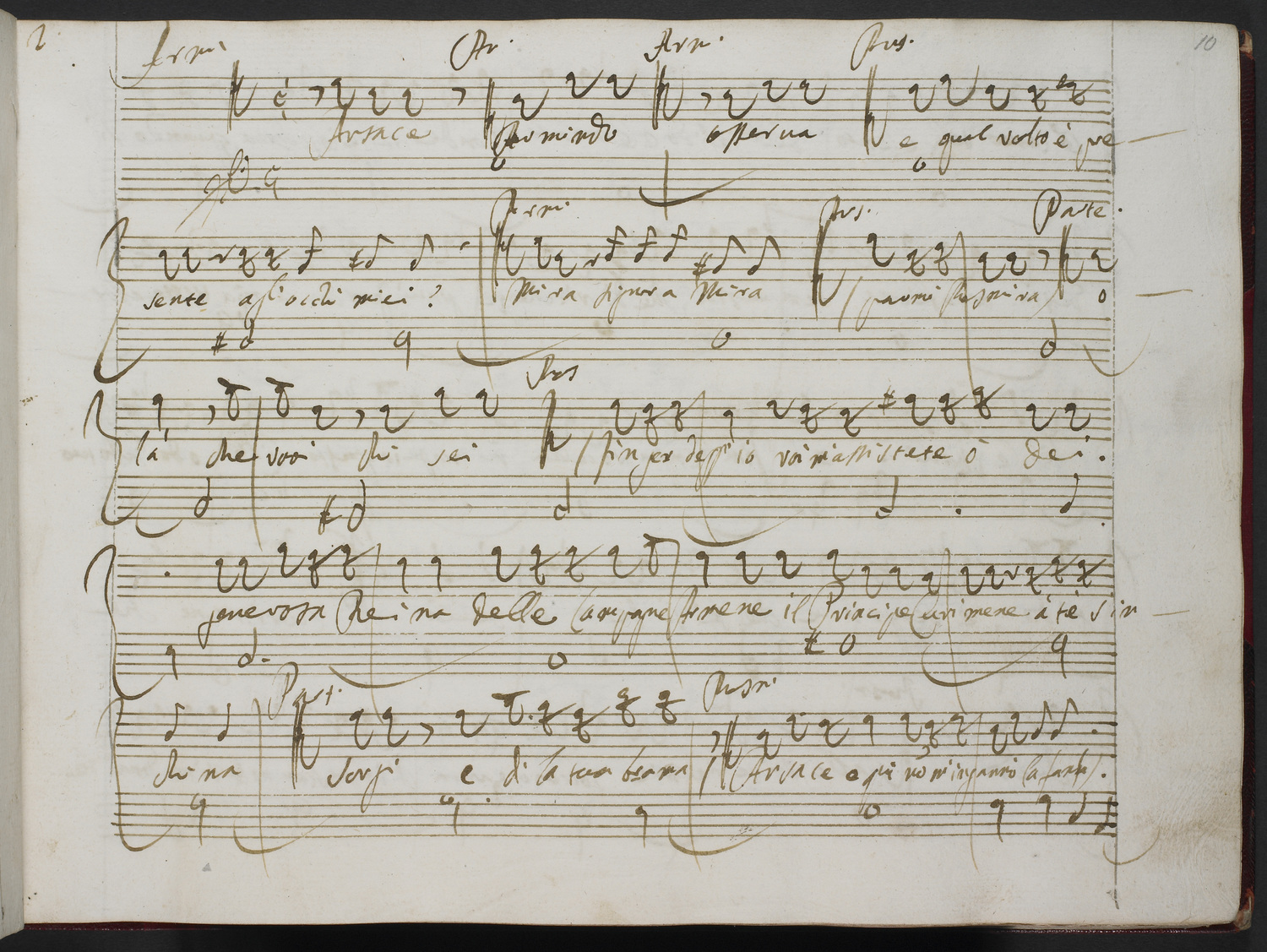
Vinci's manuscript of Partenope

He was born at Strongoli and educated at Naples under Gaetano Greco in the Conservatorio dei Poveri di Gesù Cristo. He first became known for his opere buffe (comic operas) in the Neapolitan language in 1719; he also composed many opere serie (dramatic operas). He was received into the Congregation of the Rosary, a lay religious and burial fraternity, at Formiello in 1728. He died in May 1730. Vinci is rumoured to have been poisoned by a jealous husband in the wake of an ill-advised affair, a story which is given by several reliable authorities without evident contradictions. (Note: Markstrom (2007, p. 344) noted that "..causes, such as poison. Although the story of Vinci's poisoning cannot be proven, it cannot be disproved, as is the case of similar stories connected with the deaths of Pergolesi and Mozart. Because we have this story from several reliable authorities without any obvious contradictions, one must let the story stand as is, within the realm of possibility.")

== Music ==
Vinci's opere buffe, of which Li zite 'ngalera (1722) is generally regarded as the best, are full of life and spirit; his opere serie, of which Didone Abbandonata (Rome, 1726) and Artaserse (Rome, 1730) are the most notable, have an incisive vigour and directness of dramatic expression praised by music historian Charles Burney. According to Burney,

"Vinci seems to have been the first opera composer who, without degrading his art, rendered it the friend, though not the slave to poetry, by simplifying and polishing melody and calling the audience's attention to the voice part by liberating it from fugue, complication, and labored contrivance ".

— Charles Burney, A General History of Music (1789)

The well-known aria "Vo solcando," from Artaserse, is a good example of his style.

== Works ==
=== Operas ===
- Le doje lettere (1719)
- Lo cecato fauzo (1719)
- Lo scagno (1720)
- Lo scassone (1720)
- Lo Barone di Trocchia (1721)
- Don Ciccio (1721)
- Li zite 'ngalera (1722)
- La festa di Bacco (1722)
- Publio Cornelio Scipione (1722)
- Lo castiello sacchiato (1722)
- Lo labberinto (1723)
- Semiramide (1723)
- Silla dittatore (1723)
- L'Eraclea (1724)
- Farnace (1724)
- La mogliera fedele (1724)
- Turno Aricino (1724)
- Ifigenia in Tauride (1725)
- La Rosmira fedele (1725) also known as Partenope (1725)
- Il trionfo di Camilla (1725)
- Elpidia (1725)
- L'Astianatte (1725)
- Didone abbandonata (1726)
- Siroe, Re di Persia (1726)
- L'asteria (1726)
- Ernelinda (1726)
- Gismondo, Rè di Polonia (1727)
- La caduta dei Decemviri (1727)
- Il Medo (1728)
- Catone in Utica (1728)
- Flavio Anicio Olibrio (1728)
- Alessandro nell'Indie (1729)
- Farnace (1729)
- La Contesa dei Numi (1729)
- Massimiano (1729)
- Artaserse (1730)

=== Other works ===
In addition to operas, Vinci wrote a few cantatas, sonatas, a serenata, and two oratorios (Oratorio di Maria dolorata ca. 1723 and Oratorio per la Santissima Vergine del Rosario ca. 1730). His sonata in D major for flute and basso continuo is still played today. He composed two sonatas for the recorder in addition to a recorder concerto in A minor.

== Selected recordings ==
- Fileno – Soprano Cantatas Mesta Oh Dio, tra queste selve. Mi costa tante lacrime. Amor di Citerea. Parto, ma con qual core. Emanuela Galli & Francesca Cassinari, Stile Galante, Stefano Aresi. With work wrongly attributed to Vinci by Alessandro Scarlatti Fille, tu parti? Oh Dio! Pan Classics 2011.
- In 2015 Decca released a Parnassus Arts Productions recording of his 3-act opera seria, Catone in Utica (Rome, 1728).

== Sources ==
- Markstrom, Kurt (2001). "Vinci, Leonardo". Grove Music Online. Oxford: Oxford University Press. doi:10.1093/gmo/9781561592630.article.29423. ISBN 978-1-56159-263-0. (subscription, Wikilibrary access, or UK public library membership required)
- Markstrom, Kurt Sven (2007). The Operas of Leonardo Vinci, Napoletano. Hillsdale: Pendragon Press. ISBN 978-1-57647-094-7.
- "Leonardo Vinci | Italian composer". Encyclopædia Britannica. Chicago: Encyclopædia Britannica, Inc. 1 January 2021.
