= Nicola Porpora =

Italian composer (1686–1768)

Nicola Antonio Porpora
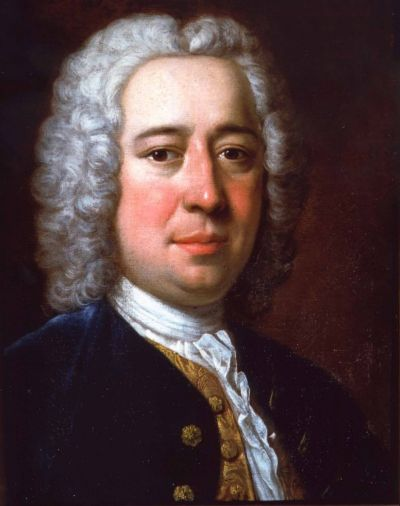
- Born: 17 August 1686; Naples
- Died: 3 March 1768 (aged 81); Naples
- Education: Poveri di Gesù Cristo
- Occupations: Composer; voice teacher
- Organizations: Conservatorio di Sant'Onofrio; Poveri di Gesù Cristo
- Works: List of operas

Nicola (or Niccolò) Antonio Giacinto Porpora (17 August 1686 – 3 March 1768) was an Italian composer and teacher of singing of the Baroque era, whose most famous singing students were the castrati Farinelli and Caffarelli. Other students included composers Johann Adolph Hasse, Matteo Capranica and Joseph Haydn.

== Biography ==
Porpora was born in Naples, Italy. He graduated from the music conservatory Poveri di Gesù Cristo of his native city, where the civic opera scene was dominated by Alessandro Scarlatti. Porpora's first opera, Agrippina, was successfully performed at the Neapolitan court in 1708. His second, Berenice, was performed at Rome. In a long career, he followed these up by many further operas, supported as maestro di cappella in the households of aristocratic patrons, such as the commander of military forces at Naples, prince Philip of Hesse-Darmstadt, or of the Portuguese ambassador at Rome, for composing operas alone did not yet make a viable career. However, his enduring fame rests chiefly upon his unequalled power of teaching singing. At the Neapolitan Conservatorio di Sant'Onofrio and with the Poveri di Gesù Cristo he trained Farinelli, Caffarelli, Salimbeni, and other celebrated vocalists, during the period 1715 to 1721. In 1720 and 1721 he wrote two serenades to libretti by a gifted young poet, Metastasio, the beginning of a long, though interrupted, collaboration. In 1722 his operatic successes encouraged him to lay down his conservatory commitments.

After a rebuff from the court of Charles VI at Vienna in 1725, Porpora settled mostly in Venice, composing and teaching regularly in the schools of La Pietà and the Incurabili. In 1729 the anti-Handel clique invited him to London to set up an opera company as a rival to Handel's, without success, and in the 1733–1734 season, even the presence of his pupil, the great Farinelli, failed to save the dramatic company in Lincoln's Inn Fields (the "Opera of the Nobility") from bankruptcy.

An interval as Kapellmeister at the Dresden court of the Elector of Saxony and Polish King Augustus from 1748 ended in strained relations with his rival in Venice and Rome, the hugely successful opera composer Johann Adolph Hasse and his wife, the prima donna Faustina, and resulted in Porpora's departure in 1752.

As his accompanist and valet he hired the youthful Joseph Haydn, who was making his way in Vienna as a struggling freelancer. Haydn later remembered Porpora thus: "There was no lack of Asino, Coglione, Birbante [ass, cullion, rascal], and pokes in the ribs, but I put up with it all, for I profited greatly from Porpora in singing, in composition, and in the Italian language." He also said that he had learned from the maestro "the true fundamentals of composition".

In 1753 Porpora spent three summer months, with Haydn in tow, at the spa town Mannersdorf am Leithagebirge. His function there was to continue the singing lessons of the mistress of the ambassador of Venice to the Austrian Empire, Pietro Correr.

Porpora returned in 1759 to Naples.

From this time Porpora's career was a series of misfortunes: his florid style was becoming old-fashioned, his last opera, Camilla, failed, his pension from Dresden stopped, and he became so poor that the expenses of his funeral were paid by a subscription concert. Yet at the moment of his death, Farinelli and Caffarelli were living in splendid retirement on fortunes largely based on the excellence of the old maestro's teaching.

A linguist, recognized for the idiomatic fluency of his recitatives, and a man of considerable literary culture, Porpora was also known for his conversational wit. He was well-read in Latin and Italian literature, wrote poetry and spoke French, German, and English.

Besides some four dozen operas, there are oratorios, solo cantatas with keyboard accompaniment, motets and vocal serenades. Among his larger works, his 1720 opera Orlando, oratorio Gedeone (1737), one mass, his Venetian Vespers, and the operas Germanico in Germania (1732) and Arianna in Nasso (1733 according to HOASM) have been recorded.

== Works ==
=== Vocal music ===
==== Operas ====
See List of operas by Nicola Porpora.

==== Oratorios ====
- Davide e Bersabea (P. Rolli; London 1734)
- Il Gedeone (text by A. Perrucci; Vienna March 28, 1737) recorded in 1999 on CPO 999 615-2
- Il Verbo in carne (anon.; Dresden 1748)

==== Cantatas ====
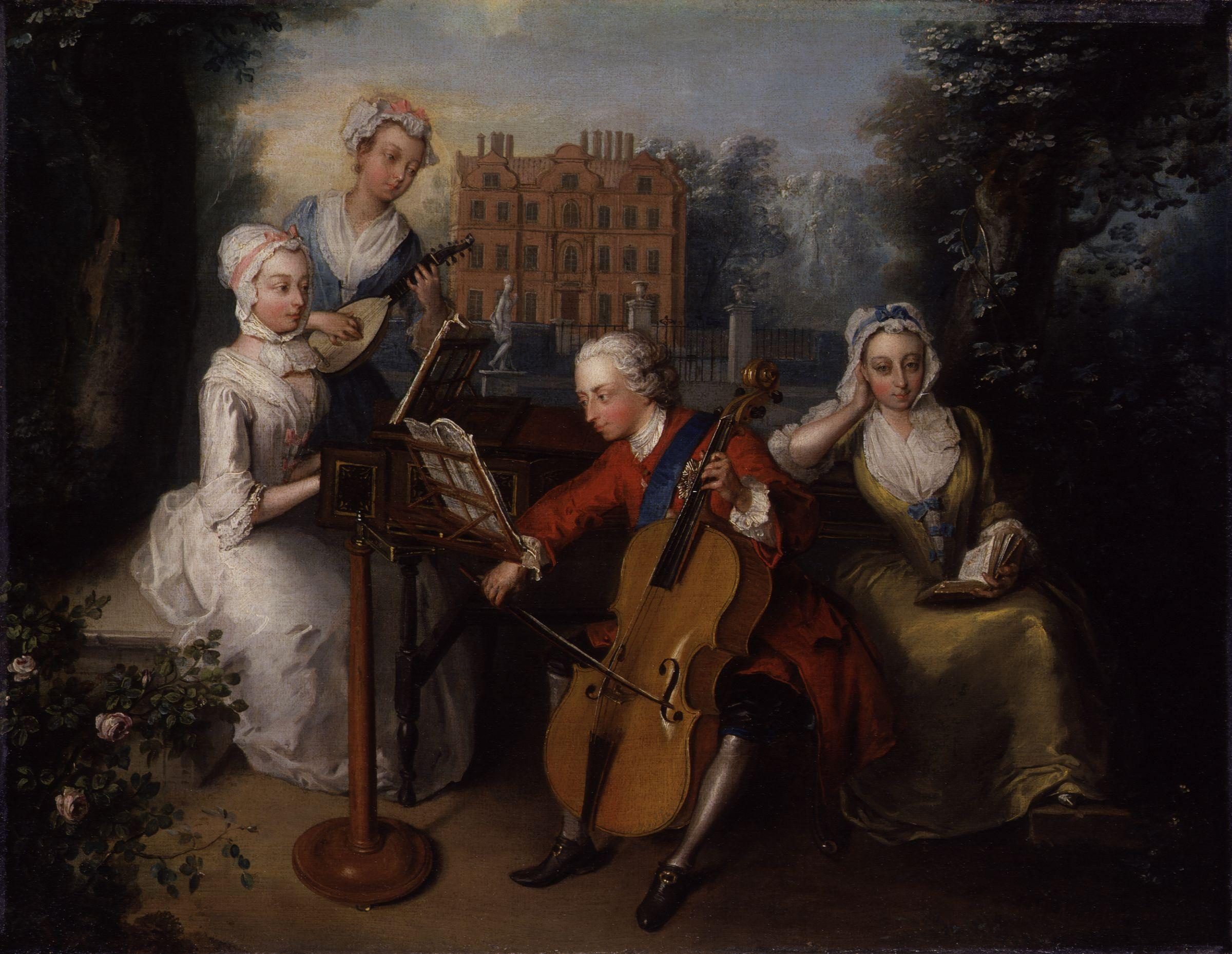
The Music Party by Philippe Mercier, 1733: Frederick, Prince of Wales with his younger sisters Anne, Caroline and Amelia

- 12 cantatas for solo voice and continuo dedicated to Frederick, Prince of Wales (London, 1735)

I. D'amore il primo dardo
II. Nel mio sonno almen (Il sogno)
III. Tirsi chiamare a nome
IV. Queste che miri o Nice
V. Scrivo in te l'amato nome (Il nome)
VI. Già la notte s'avvicina (La pesca)
VII. Veggo la selva e il monte
VIII. Or che una nube ingrata
IX. Destatevi destatevi o pastori
X. Oh se fosse il mio core
XI. Oh Dio che non è vero
XII. Dal pover mio core

=== Instrumental music ===
- 6 Sinfonie da camera op. 2 (London 1736)
- 12 Sonatas for violin and bass op. 12
- 12 Triosonatas for 2 violins and bass (Vienna 1754)
- Sonatas for cello, violins, and Bass
- Concerto for cello, strings and bass
- Concerto for cello, 3 violins and bass

== Bibliography ==
- Griesinger, Georg August (1810). Biographical Notes Concerning Joseph Haydn. Leipzig: Breitkopf und Härtel. English translation by Vernon Gotwals, in Haydn: Two Contemporary Portraits, Milwaukee: University of Wisconsin Press.
