= Tolomeo =

Opera by Georg Friedrich Händel

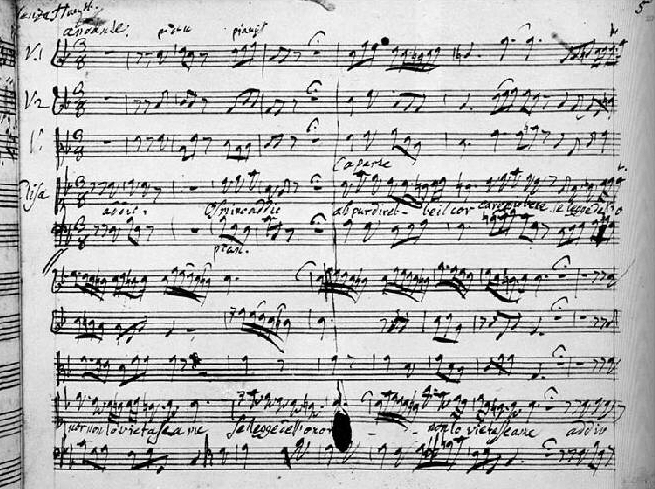
Autograph of Tolomeo, 1728

Tolomeo, re d'Egitto ("Ptolemy, King of Egypt", HWV 25) is an opera seria in three acts by George Frideric Handel to an Italian text by Nicola Francesco Haym, adapted from Carlo Sigismondo Capece's Tolomeo et Alessandro. It was Handel's 13th (or 14th if the one act Handel contributed to the collaborative opera Muzio Scevola is counted) and last opera for the Royal Academy of Music (1719) and was also the last of the operas he composed for the triumvirate of internationally renowned singers, the castrato Senesino and the sopranos Francesca Cuzzoni and Faustina Bordoni.

The story of the opera is a fictionalisation of some events in the life of Ptolemy IX Lathyros, king of Egypt.

An aria from the opera, Non lo dirò col labbro, was adapted by Arthur Somervell (1863–1937) as the popular English-language classic "Silent Worship" in 1928.

== Performance history ==
Tolomeo was first performed at the King's Theatre, London on 30 April 1728 and received seven performances. It was revived with revisions on 19 May 1730 and 2 January 1733, a mark of the work's popularity. The first production of modern times was conducted by Fritz Lehmann at Göttingen on 19 June 1938. As with all Baroque opera seria, Tolomeo went unperformed for many years, but with the revival of interest in Baroque music and historically informed musical performance since the 1960s,Tolomeo, like all Handel operas, receives performances at festivals and opera houses today. Among other productions, Tolomeo was performed at the Handel Festival in Halle in 1996, by English Touring Opera in 2006, and by Glimmerglass Opera in 2010.

== Roles ==
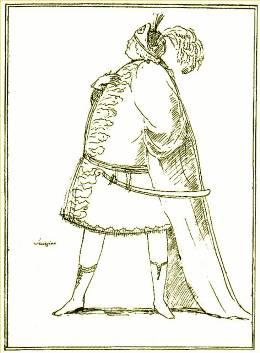
Caricature of Senesino, who created the role of Tolomeo

Roles, voice types, and premiere cast
Role	Voice type	Premiere Cast, 30 April 1728
Tolomeo, former ruler of Egypt	alto castrato	Francesco Bernardi, called "Senesino"
Seleuce, wife of Tolomeo	soprano	Francesca Cuzzoni
Elisa, sister of Araspe	soprano	Faustina Bordoni
Alessandro, brother of Tolomeo	alto castrato	Antonio Baldi
Araspe, King of Cyprus	bass	Giuseppe Maria Boschi

== Synopsis ==
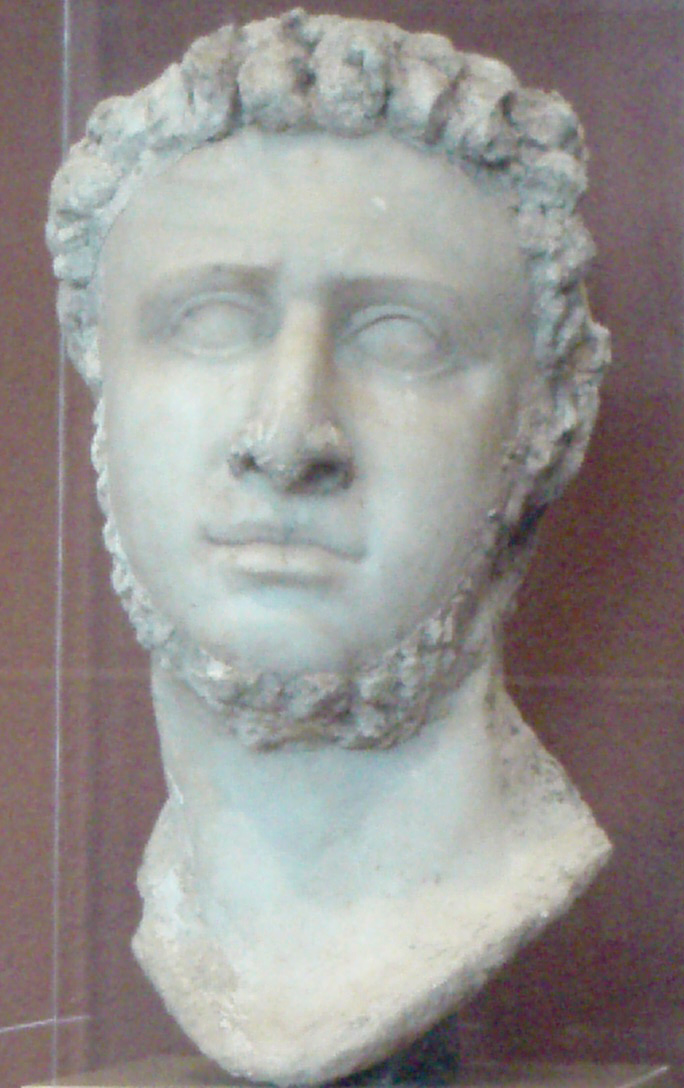
Ptolemy IX

Place: Cyprus
Time: around 108 BC

The action takes place at the time of Ptolemy IX (Tolomeo), who was deposed by his mother and joint ruler of Egypt Cleopatra III in favour of his younger brother Ptolemy X (Alessandro). Its themes include revenge, lust, lost love, devotion, and eventually, reconciliation.

=== Act 1 ===
The action opens with Tolomeo on the beach of Cyprus, where he meets his shipwrecked brother, Alessandro. Alessandro has come under orders from Cleopatra to kill his own flesh and blood. Tolomeo becomes aware of Alessandro's identity and is tempted to kill him, but can't bring himself to do so. Tolomeo (going under the name of Osmin to protect himself from the wrath of King Araspe, an ally of Cleopatra) hides, and Elisa, sister of the king, turns up. Alessandro wakes, thinks she is like a goddess, and declares his love for her. She, however, loves "Osmin." She is very flirtatious. But as she and "Osmin" talk, it becomes clear that her feelings are not requited, that Tolomeo loves another (Seleuce, his wife, who he thinks is lost). Alone, he considers taking his own life.

We are then introduced to Seleuce who is also going under an alias, "Delia." She sings of her dispossession, then sees Tolomeo on the shore, but she runs away when Araspe arrives. Araspe is furious at Seleuce, whom he pursues with amorous intent. Act One closes with Tolomeo visualising his wife, wishing that she could appear before him and ease his pain.

=== Act 2 ===
Tolomeo loses his temper and declares to Elisa that he is not "Osmin" but is indeed the deposed joint ruler of Egypt. Elisa tells the resentful Araspe to bring "Delia" before them. This is done and Tolomeo rapturously declares his love to Seleuce. She, in order to protect Tolomeo, pretends she doesn't know what he is talking about, while in typical operatic fashion voicing her inner thoughts in parentheses; how this deception is painful to her and she longs for her husband.

Tolomeo reiterates that he cannot love Elisa and she rages at this. Tolomeo leaves and Alessandro enters, reiterating his love for Elisa. Elisa claims that the only way she can love him in return is if he murders his brother. Seleuce sings another lament and Tolomeo echoes her words in the background. Araspe bursts onto the scene and tries to rape Seleuce. Tolomeo can't bear the sight and rushes to defend his wife. He reveals their true identities, and Araspe sings ruggedly of how he will punish the lovers. The couple are left alone at the end of act two and touchingly sing synchronised for the first time of how their love for one another will doom them both.

=== Act 3 ===
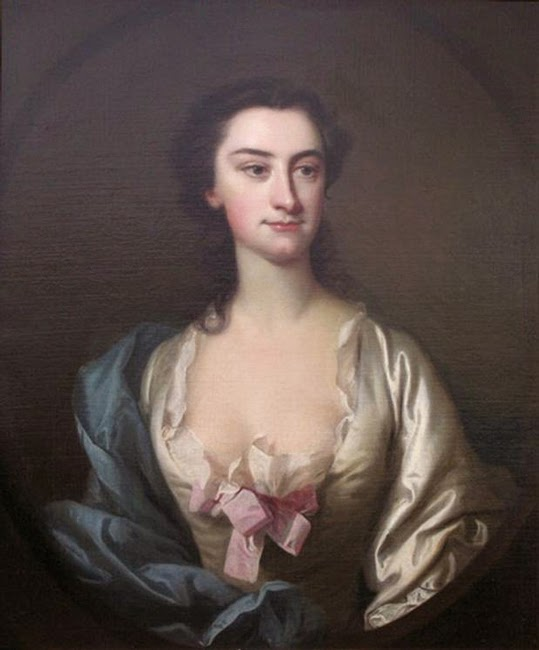
Francesca Cuzzoni, who created the role of Seleuce

Alessandro has a letter positing the death of Cleopatra. He says she has paid the price for her cruelty. Somehow Araspe interprets Alessandro saying he wants to go home to Egypt with Tolomeo as meaning he wants his brother slain, but wants someone else to do it. Araspe, of course, thinks himself the very man for the job and delights in avenging the jealousy he feels.

Elisa forces Seleuce to cede Tolomeo to her, saying he'll die otherwise. Tolomeo rejects Elisa once more. She says if he is so brave and intent on rejecting her, then he should drink some poison. This he does. He describes the effect the poison is having, and then, apparently, dies. Alessandro comes to the desperate Seleuce in the remotest part of the wood and promises to reunite her with Tolomeo. Araspe triumphantly reveals the body of Tolomeo to Alessandro. He is sure that Seleuce is his but Elisa reveals the potion was actually a sleeping draught and she will torture Seleuce and put her to death. At this point Tolomeo wakes up and Alessandro presents Seleuce to him. Husband and wife are reunited and Alessandro declares Tolomeo as Egypt's rightful ruler. The opera ends with a joyous quartet expounding that when suffering turns into joy, all can be forgiven.

== Context and analysis ==
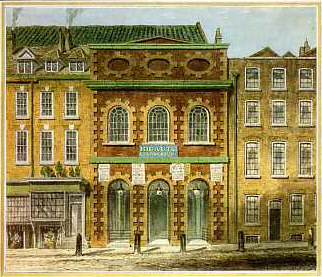
The King's Theatre, London, where Tolomeo had its first performance

The German-born Handel, after spending some of his early career composing operas and other pieces in Italy, settled in London. Therein, in 1711, Handel composed the first opera specifically-written for the London stage, Rinaldo. A tremendous success, Rinaldo intensified in London the enthusiasm for Italian opera seria, a form that focused overwhelmingly on solo arias for the star virtuoso singers. In 1719, Handel was appointed music director of an organisation called the Royal Academy of Music (unconnected with the present day London conservatoire), a company under royal charter to produce Italian operas in London. Handel was not only to compose operas for the company but hire the star singers, supervise the orchestra and musicians, and adapt operas from Italy for London performance.

Handel had composed numerous Italian operas for the Academy, with varying degrees of success; some were enormously popular. The castrato Senesino and the soprano Francesca Cuzzoni had appeared in a succession of Handel operas for the Academy (he was not the only composer who composed operas for the company) most of which had been successful with audiences, and in 1726 the directors of the Academy brought over another internationally renowned singer, Faustina Bordoni, to add to the company's attractions. The two prima donnas had appeared in continental European countries in operas together without incident, but in London they developed rival groups of fans that interrupted the performances with rowdy displays of partisanship for one lady or another. This came to a climax on 6 June 1727 during a performance at the King's Theatre of Astianatte by Giovanni Bononcini with both singers onstage and royalty in the audience. Fist fights and disorder between rival groups of fans broke out in the audience and the two sopranos exchanged insults and came to blows onstage. The rest of the opera was cut, the performers going straight to the short final chorus, and the scandal was gleefully repeated in the newspapers, in satirical skits on other stages, and in mock-heroic verse, bringing the entire form of Italian opera into a certain amount of disrepute in London.

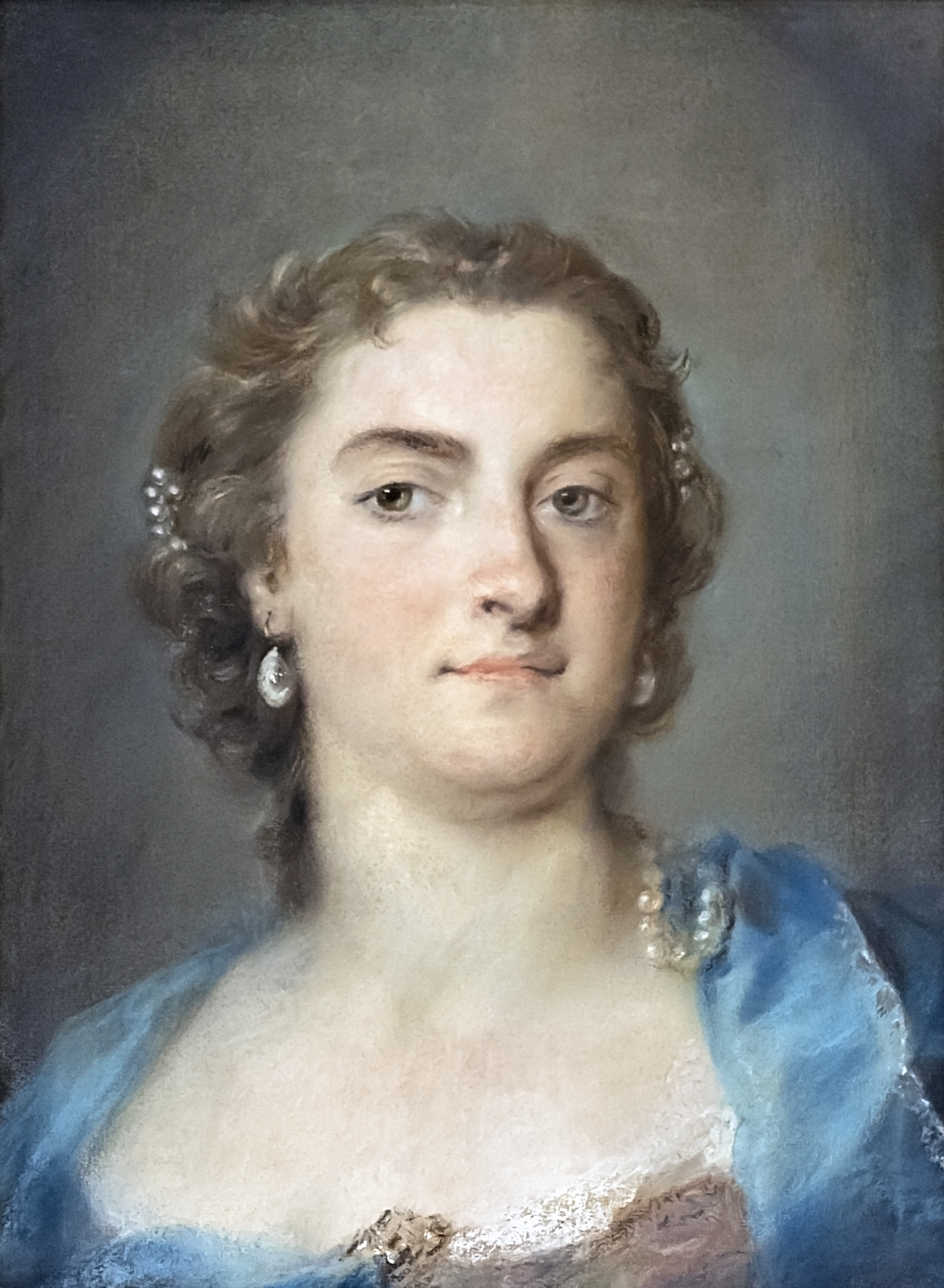
Faustina Bordoni, who created the role of Elisa

Handel continued to supply operas for the trio of star singers, Senesino, Cuzzoni and Faustina (as she was known) however, even though these singers received astronomical fees, much more than he received for composing the works, which combined with declining audience numbers caused at least in part by the ridicule brought upon Italian opera by the rival sopranos' public spat, was causing severe financial difficulty for the Royal Academy of Music.

After the 1728 season closed, the Royal Academy of Music was dissolved, but Handel went into partnership with John James Heidegger, the theatrical impresario who held the lease on the King's Theatre in the Haymarket where the operas were presented, and Handel set out to Italy to find singers for his 1729 season, Cuzzoni, Senesino and Faustina having all left London for engagements on the continent of Europe.

Handel found a new prima donna, Anna Strada, for his 1729 season. One of Handel's librettists, Paolo Rolli, wrote in a letter (the original is in Italian) that Handel said that Strada "sings better than the two who have left us, because one of them (Faustina) never pleased him at all and he would like to forget the other (Cuzzoni).

The aria for Alessandro in the opera, No.3 in the score, '' Non lo dirò col labbro", with an English text as "Silent Worship", is featured in the 1996 film adaptation of Jane Austen's novel Emma. Although Somervell's English translation was done more than a century after Austen's novel, the original Italian aria was recorded in Jane Austen's own handwritten songbooks.

The opera is scored for two recorders, flute, two oboes, bassoon, two horns, strings, and continuo (cello, lute, harpsichord).

== Recordings ==
Tolomeo discography
Year	Cast: Tolomeo, Seleuce, Elisa, Alessandro, Araspe	Conductor, orchestra	Label
1995	Jennifer Lane, Brenda Harris, Andrea Matthews, Mary Ann Hart, Peter Castaldi	Richard Auldon Clark; Manhattan Chamber Orchestra	CD:Vox; Cat:3 7530
2006	Ann Hallenberg, Karina Gauvin, Anna Bonitatibus, Romina Basso, Pietro Spagnoli	Alan Curtis; Il Complesso Barocco	CD:DG Archiv, Cat:477 710-6
