= Flavio =

Opera in three acts by Handel

George Frideric Handel

Flavio, re de' Longobardi ("Flavio, King of the Lombards", HWV 16) is an opera seria in three acts by George Frideric Handel. The Italian-language libretto was by Nicola Francesco Haym, after Matteo Noris's Flavio Cuniberto. It was Handel's fourth full-length opera for the Royal Academy of Music. Handel had originally entitled the opera after the character of Emilia in the opera.

Flavio is unusually concise for an opera by Handel of this period. It is also notable as a skillful blend of tragedy and comedy, both in the text and the music, and for being one of Handel's few operas to feature leading roles for all major voice categories of his day – soprano, contralto, castrato, tenor and bass. The Act III Scene VII duet, "Deh, perdona, o dolce bene", sung by Guido and Emilia is a well known excerpt from the opera.

== Performance history ==
Handel completed the score only seven days before the premiere, at the King's Theatre in the Haymarket on 14 May 1723. There were eight performances in the premiere run. The work was revived on 18 April 1732, under the direction of the composer, for four performances.

There were no further revivals until it was rediscovered and performed in Göttingen on 2 July 1967. The first UK performance since Handel's time was on 26 August 1969 at the Unicorn Theatre in Abingdon-on-Thames, England. As with all Baroque opera seria, Flavio went unperformed for many years, but with the revival of interest in Baroque music and historically informed musical performance since the 1960s, Flavio, like all Handel operas, receives performances at festivals and opera houses today. Among other productions, Flavio was performed at the New York City Opera in 2007 and by English Touring Opera in 2009.

== Roles ==
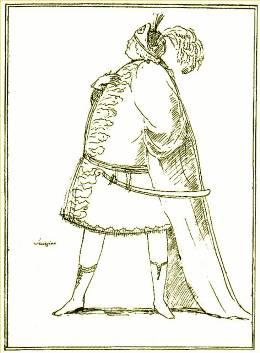
Caricature of Senesino, who created the role of Guido

Roles, voice types, and premiere cast
| Roles | Voice type | Premiere cast, 14 May 1723 |
|---|---|---|
| Flavio | alto castrato | Gaetano Berenstadt |
| Guido | alto castrato | Francesco Bernardi, called Senesino |
| Emilia | soprano | Francesca Cuzzoni |
| Vitige | soprano | Margherita Durastanti |
| Teodata | contralto | Anastasia Robinson |
| Lotario | bass | Giuseppe Maria Boschi |
| Ugone | tenor | Alexander Gordon |

== Synopsis ==
Scene:Lombardy, in legendary times.

Flavio, King of Lombardy, is also King of Britain. He has two trusted, elderly counsellors, Lotario and Ugone. Lotario's daughter Emilia is engaged to Ugone's son, Guido. Ugone has another daughter, Teodata, who is young and famous for her great beauty. Teodata has a secret boyfriend, Vitige, courtier of the King.

=== Act 1 ===
Vitige slips away from his sweetheart Teodata's bedroom as dawn breaks. The two take a tender farewell of each other.

Guido and Emilia are married in a ceremony with their immediate families present. The newly married couple sing of their happiness and look forward to the wedding party that evening.

Ugone presents his daughter Teodata to the King. Flavio is greatly struck by her beauty and suggests she become lady-in-waiting to the Queen (who does not appear in the opera). King Flavio receives word that his governor in Britain has become incapacitated through illness and needs to be replaced. The King offers the position to his counsellor Lotario, but changes his mind and offers the job to Ugone instead, thinking that with her father out of the way, he will more easily be able to seduce his lovely daughter Teodata. Lotario is furious that the King has backtracked on the prime position he was offered.

Flavio praises the beauty of Teodata to his courtier Vitige, whom the King does not realise is Teodata's secret lover. Vitige tries to play down her attraction, telling the King that he doesn't think she is at all pleasing to look at. This produces no effect on the King's ardour, however.

Ugone tells his son Guido that he has been gravely insulted by Lotario, who has slapped him across the face. His honour demands that he fight a duel, but he is too old now, and demands that his son do so in his stead. Guido has to agree that his duty demands that he kill the father of his new bride. When Emilia meets up with Guido, he is too ashamed to look her in the eye. She does not understand what is wrong, but declares she will always love him, no matter what.

=== Act 2 ===
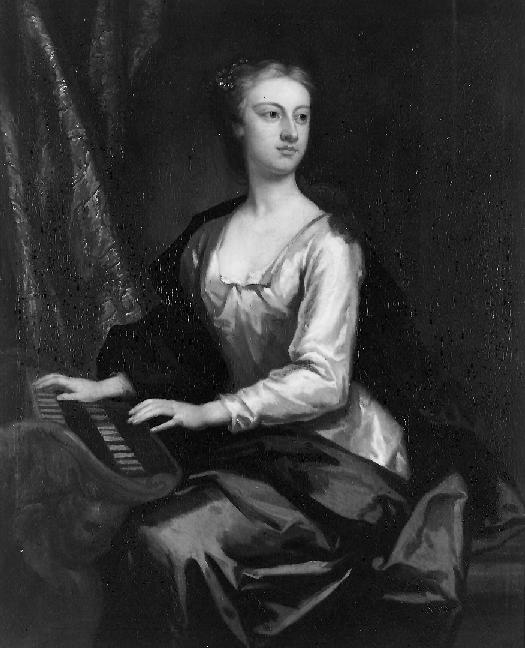
Anastasia Robinson, who created the role of Teodata

Flavio has ordered the lovely Teodata to come to him and is working on seducing her when her father bursts into the room, protesting about the loss of his honour. The King leaves Ugone with his daughter, who believes, mistakenly, that he must have discovered her clandestine relationship with Vitige and confesses all. This only makes Ugone bewail the loss of his family honour even more.

Lotario tells his daughter Emilia that her marriage to Guido is null and void and demands that she abandon him. She tells Guido what her father is asking her to do, but says she will never cease to love Guido. Guido is torn by his love for her and his duty to avenge the insult to his father.

The King orders his courtier Vitige to go to Teodata, tell her that the King loves her, and bring her to him. Vitige and Teodata decide the best strategy in this difficult situation will be for her not to reject the King but to play along with him.

Guido challenges Lotario to a duel. The older man scornfully accepts, feeling that his greater experience will allow an easy victory, but is mortally wounded. The horrified Emilia finds her dying father in a pool of his own blood. He tells her Guido was responsible, and expires. Emilia vows to be revenged.

=== Act 3 ===
Emilia and Ugone both go to the King, she demanding justice for her father's murder, he justifying his son's action by his vindication of the insult to him. Flavio says he will consider the matter; really he is more concerned at the moment with trying to seduce Teodata.

Vitige brings Teodata to the King and has to listen as Flavio declares she will be his real Queen, which makes him enraged with jealousy.

Emilia confronts Guido, who gives her his sword and tells her to run him through. She takes the sword but is unable to kill him and leaves.

Vitige and Teodata have a quarrel about her treatment of the King as Flavio listens unobserved. She points out that Vitige told her to play along with Flavio, but Vitige says he did not mean that she should go that far. Flavio comes out of his hiding place, declares they have both deceived him and they will be punished.

Flavio now realises that he will have to show wise judgement like a good King. He sends for Emilia and tells her that he has followed her desire; he has had Guido decapitated for killing her father and in fact she can see the severed head right away. Emilia swoons away and while she is unconscious the King has Guido come to her side so that when she revives they are joyously reunited.

He sends for Vitige and tells him that his punishment will be that he will have to marry the girl who he does not think is nice to look at, Teodata, and presents her to him.

So both pairs of lovers will marry, Ugone will go to Britain to take up his position as governor, and Flavio remain faithful to his wife.

== Context and analysis ==
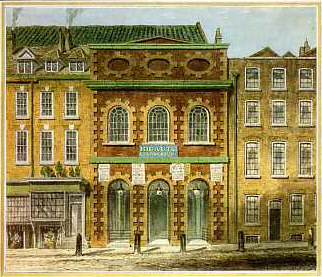
The King's Theatre, London, where Flavio had its first performance

The German-born Handel, after spending some of his early career composing operas and other pieces in Italy, settled in London, where in 1711 he had brought Italian opera for the first time with his opera Rinaldo. A tremendous success, Rinaldo created a craze in London for Italian opera seria, a form focused overwhelmingly on solo arias for the star virtuoso singers. In 1719, Handel was appointed music director of an organisation called the Royal Academy of Music (unconnected with the present day London conservatoire), a company under royal charter to produce Italian operas in London. Handel was not only to compose operas for the company but hire the star singers, supervise the orchestra and musicians, and adapt operas from Italy for London performance.

Ottone, an opera by Handel presented for the Academy in January 1723, was the first time London audiences had seen the operatic superstars, castrato Senesino and soprano Francesca Cuzzoni, performing together in an opera, and had been an immense success, with demand for tickets far outstripping supply

Flavio, following Ottone in the same year and with the same leading singers, did not create such a sensation as Ottone had, although it was successful enough with audiences to be revived by Handel in a subsequent season. One reason for this may have been Flavio's comparative brevity, as announced in the playbills by the Academy

At the King's Theatre...this present Tuesday...will be performed a New Opera call'd, FLAVIUS...By reason of the shortness of the Opera, to begin exactly at Eight a-Clock.

Flavio also mixes high tragedy with amorous intrigue and comic interludes, which was perhaps not what London audiences, who had become accustomed to heroic dramas on a consistent note of serious drama in Italian opera, were expecting.

The work is lightly scored mostly for strings and continuo instruments only, with woodwinds being used sparingly. Handel's music treats some of the complications of the plot with mock-heroic irony, but the more serious passages produce intense dramatic music from the composer. 18th century musicologist Charles Burney praised the aria " Amor, nel mio penar" written for Senesino as Guido, torn between love and duty, as "extremely pathetic" and the aria for Emilia, "Amante stravagante" became a popular success as a separate song with English words fitted to it as "See, see, my charmer flyes me".

During rehearsals for Flavio, the tenor Alexander Gordon became frustrated with Handel's direction of the music from the harpsichord and threatened to jump on the instrument, to which Handel replied "Oh! Let me know when you will do that and I will advertise it. For I am sure more people will come to see you jump than to hear you sing."

=== The engraving of a scene from Flavio ===
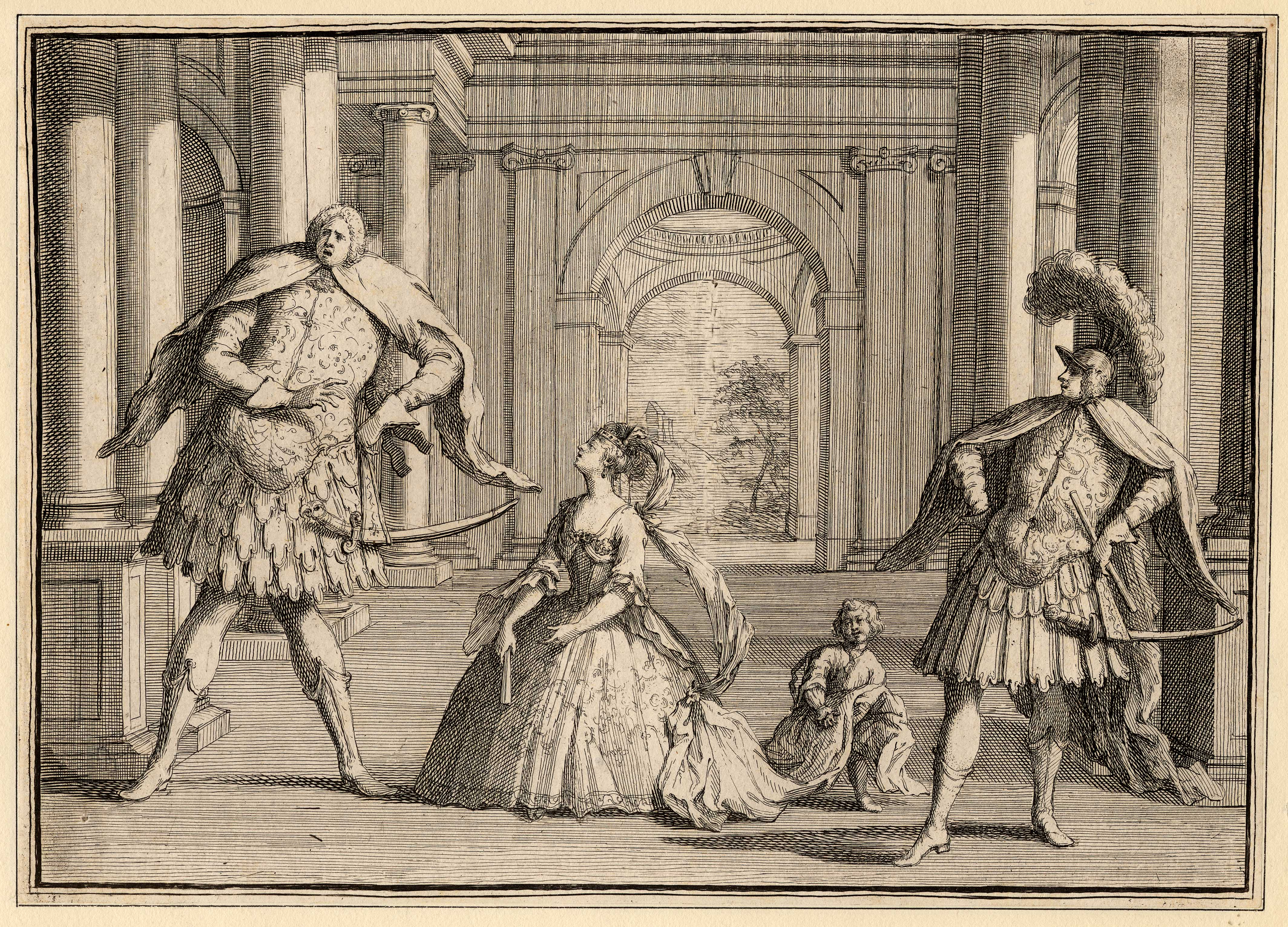
Senesino, Cuzzoni and Berenstadt, probably in a scene from Flavio

Although a caricature, the contemporary engraving of Senesino on the left, Francesca Cuzzoni and castrato Gaetano Berenstadt on the right, provides valuable information about the visual aspect of the original performances of Handel operas. The illustration is probably of a scene from Flavio. The elongated bodies of the castrati tower over Cuzzoni, who was described by Horace Walpole as "short and squat". The set is architectural and generic, not a specific locale, and the costumes for the men are also generic, with some inspiration from ancient Roman military attire, breastplates and leg armour, combined with plumes on the headdresses. Such costumes were worn by the leading men in Handel operas whether the setting was ancient Rome or Gothic Europe. Cuzzoni, in contrast, wears a contemporary gown such as might have been suitable for presentation at court, with a dwarf to serve as her train-bearer.

== Recordings ==
Flavio discography
| Year | Cast: Flavio, Guido, Emilia, Teodata, Vitige, Ugone, Lotario | Conductor, orchestra | Label |
|---|---|---|---|
| 1989 | Jeffrey Gall, Derek Lee Ragin, Lena Lootens, Bernarda Fink, Christina Högman, Gianpaolo Fagotto, Ulrich Messthaler | René Jacobs, Ensemble 415 | CD: Harmonia Mundi, Cat: 2901312/13 |
| 2010 | Tim Mead, Iestyn Davies, Rosemary Joshua, Hilary Summers, Renata Pokupić, Thomas Walker, Andrew Foster-Williams | Christian Curnyn, Early Opera Group | CD: Chandos, Cat: CHAN0773(2) |
