= Admeto =

Opera by George Frideric Handel

George Frideric Handel

Admeto, re di Tessaglia ("Admetus, King of Thessaly", HWV 22) is a three-act opera written for the Royal Academy of Music with music composed by George Frideric Handel to an Italian-language libretto prepared by Nicola Francesco Haym. The story is partly based on Euripides' Alcestis. The opera's first performance was at the Haymarket Theatre in London on 31 January 1727. The original cast included Faustina Bordoni as Alcestis and Francesca Cuzzoni as Antigona, as Admeto was the second of the five operas that Handel composed to feature specifically these two prime donne of the day.

The opera was very successful at its first performances. However the presence of two prima donnas in the London operas had created factions of very partisan supporters of either one or the other ladies, and some performances were disrupted by hisses and loud cat calls by supporters of one of the star sopranos whenever the other one was singing, creating public scandal.

== Background ==
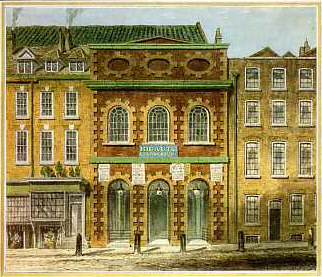
The King's Theatre, London, where Admeto had its first performance.

The German-born Handel, after spending some of his early career composing operas and other pieces in Italy, settled in London, where in 1711 he had brought Italian opera for the first time with his opera Rinaldo. A tremendous success, Rinaldo created a craze in London for Italian opera seria, a form focused overwhelmingly on solo arias for the star virtuoso singers. In 1719, Handel was appointed music director of an organisation called the Royal Academy of Music (unconnected with the present day London conservatoire), a company under royal charter to produce Italian operas in London. Handel was not only to compose operas for the company but hire the star singers, supervise the orchestra and musicians, and adapt operas from Italy for London performance.

Handel had composed numerous Italian operas for the academy, with varying degrees of success; some were enormously popular. The star soprano Francesca Cuzzoni had partnered with internationally renowned castrato Senesino as the leading performers in a long series of Italian operas by Handel and other composers for the academy, and to increase audience interest, the directors decided to import another celebrated singer from Italy, soprano Faustina Bordoni, so that the operas would have not one but two leading ladies onstage. This was a common practice in opera houses of the day in Italy; Cuzzoni and Faustina (as Bordoni was called) had appeared together in various European cities without incident.

== Roles ==
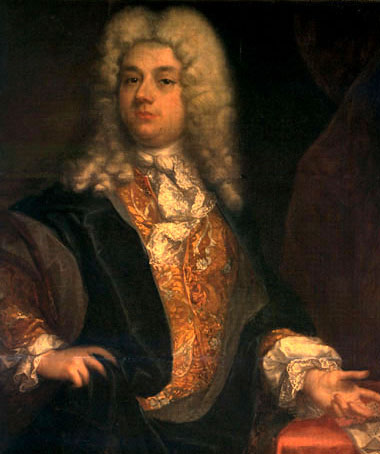
Senesino, who created the role of Admeto

Roles, voice types, and premiere cast
Role	Voice type	Premiere cast 31 January 1727
Alceste (Alcestis)	soprano	Faustina Bordoni
Antigona	soprano	Francesca Cuzzoni
Admeto (Admetus)	alto castrato	Francesco Bernardi ("Senesino")
Ercole (Heracles)	bass	Giuseppe Maria Boschi
Trasimede (Thrasymedes)	alto castrato	Antonio Baldi
Orindo	contralto	Anna Vincenza Dotti
Meraspe	bass	Giovanni Battista Palmerini
Apollo	bass	
A voice	baritone	

== Synopsis ==
=== Act 1 ===
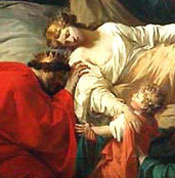
The Death of Alceste by Pierre Peyron (1785).

Scene:Greece, in legendary times.

In a room of his palace, dominated by a statue of the god Apollo, King Admetus of Thessaly lies dying, tormented by terrible dreams. He is told by a courtier, Orindo, that his brother, Trasimede, is also in a bad way, obsessed with the portrait of a woman. The hero Hercules, on his never ending mission to perform glorious deeds to increase his fame, has come to pay a visit to his friend King Admetus. As her husband the king sleeps, his wife Alceste prays to Apollo to spare his life. The statue speaks and informs her that only if a close relative dies in his place will Admetus be permitted to continue to live. Alceste resolves to sacrifice her life for her husband.

Living in a nearby wood, disguised as shepherds, are Princess Antigona of Troy (which was burnt to the ground by Hercules) and her tutor Merapse. King Admetus had been betrothed to marry Antigona, but jilted her in favour of Alceste. This rejection of her is the reason, Antigona believes, why he is being punished with a mortal illness. She sends Merapse to the palace, instructing him to pretend that he is her father.

In the gardens of the palace, Alceste holds a dagger, preparing to die in her husband's place as she bids farewell to her grieving ladies-in-waiting, and then retires. Admetus, rejuvenated, enters with his friend Hercules, celebrating his recovery. Lamentations are heard from within and Admetus is horrified to see his wife's dead body. Admetus knows that Hercules once descended into the underworld and brought the hero Theseus back to the land of the living and asks him to do the same for Alceste, to which Hercules agrees.

Merapse returns to Antigona in the woods and tells her about Alceste's death and Admetus' recovery. They are glad that now there seems to be nothing in the way of Admetus making Antigona his wife, as he had promised. A hunting party approaches, led by Trasimede, who recognises Antigona as the woman whose portrait he carries about with him at all times, never ceasing to gaze at it. She insists, however, that he is mistaken; her name is Rosilda, she tells him, and the man with her is her father, called Fidalbo. Trasimede offers her a job at the palace, working as a gardener, which Antigona is glad to accept as she will be able to be close to Admetus that way and hopes to teach him a lesson.

=== Act 2 ===
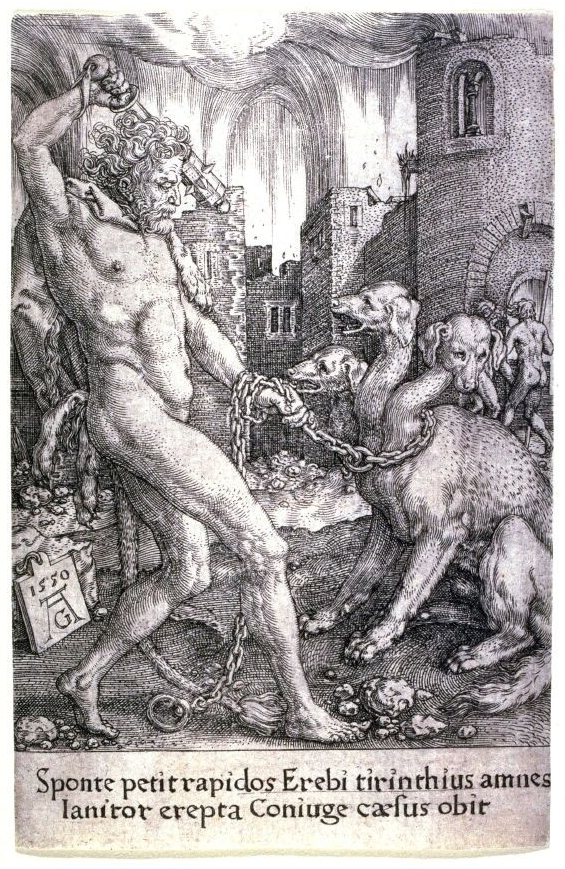
Hercules and Cerberus.

The second act opens in Hades, where Alceste, tormented by the Furies, is chained to a rock. Hercules appears, fights with Cerberus the guard dog of hell, overcomes the Furies and breaks the fetters tying Alceste to the rock. She joyfully looks forward to being reunited with her husband.

Antigona is working at her new job as a gardener at the palace, where she has attracted the unwelcome attentions of the courtier Orindo, whom she spurns. Trasimede has lost interest in the portrait he was so obsessed with now he sees "Rosilda" who so closely resembles it, and tosses the portrait aside, whereupon Orindo picks it up. Antigona / "Rosilda" is not interested in anyone but King Admetus, however, and rejects Trasimede also.

Orindo takes the portrait to Admetus and tells him that Trasimede had not been honest when he had shown him another portrait of the Trojan princess he had been engaged to; Trasimede had obviously substituted a portrait of a far less attractive girl. Admetus is astonished by the resemblance of the portrait to his new gardener "Rosilda"; she tells him that Princess Antigona is dead and asks him if she were still alive, would he marry her. Admetus gives no satisfactory answer, leaving "Rosilda" still very unhappy.

In the woods, Alceste, returned to life, is now disguised as a male soldier, worried that her husband, thinking her dead, may have fallen in love with someone else or even married another woman. When she sees the lovely "Rosilda" working in the palace gardens, she worries her fears were well-founded.

=== Act 3 ===
Trasimede, madly in love with "Rosilda", has abducted her. Meraspe tells Admetus who "Rosilda" really is and that she still loves the king. Hercules, not wanting to give Alceste's disguise away, tells Admetus that he was unable to find her in Hades. It seems to Admetus that his duty is now to marry Antigona.

Trasimede, feeling guilty about abducting "Rosilda", has released her. When the disguised Alceste sees "Rosilda" sighing over a portrait of King Admetus, she snatches it from her hand. Admetus and Antigona make plans for their wedding, watched by the jealous Trasimede and Alceste in disguise. Trasimede decides to kill his brother but Alceste dashes his weapon from his hand, saving her husband's life. When Admetus realises Alceste has been restored to life, he is undecided as to the honourable course for him to take - should he return to his wife, whom he thought dead, or keep his pledge to Antigona? Antigona solves this dilemma for him by taking his hand and putting it in that of Alceste, telling the king to return to the woman who has now saved his life twice. Trasimede begs his brother for forgiveness, which is granted. Alceste rejoices once more in her husband's love.

== Musical features ==
The opening of the opera, with Admeto on his deathbed tormented by a ballet of demons representing his inner physical and mental agony, is very striking in its use of unusual harmonies, dissonance and chromaticism, followed by a dramatic accompanied recitative for the suffering king. 18th century musicologist Charles Burney wrote that he was "told by persons who heard this opera performed when it first came out, that Senesino never sung or acted better, or more to the satisfaction of the public, than in this scene." The opening of Act Two, with an orchestral piece depicting Hercules rescuing Alceste in hell, is also very unusual for Handel operas of the period. Handel's music, according to Jonathan Keates, succeeds in making the character of the king "a fully realised human figure. Handel, as in Alessandro, is careful to give his two leading ladies equal opportunity to shine in their arias, which are, in the opinion of Paul Henry Lang, music of "surpassing" quality.

The opera is scored for flute, two oboes, bassoon, two horns, strings and continuo (cello, lute, harpsichord).

== Reception and performance history ==
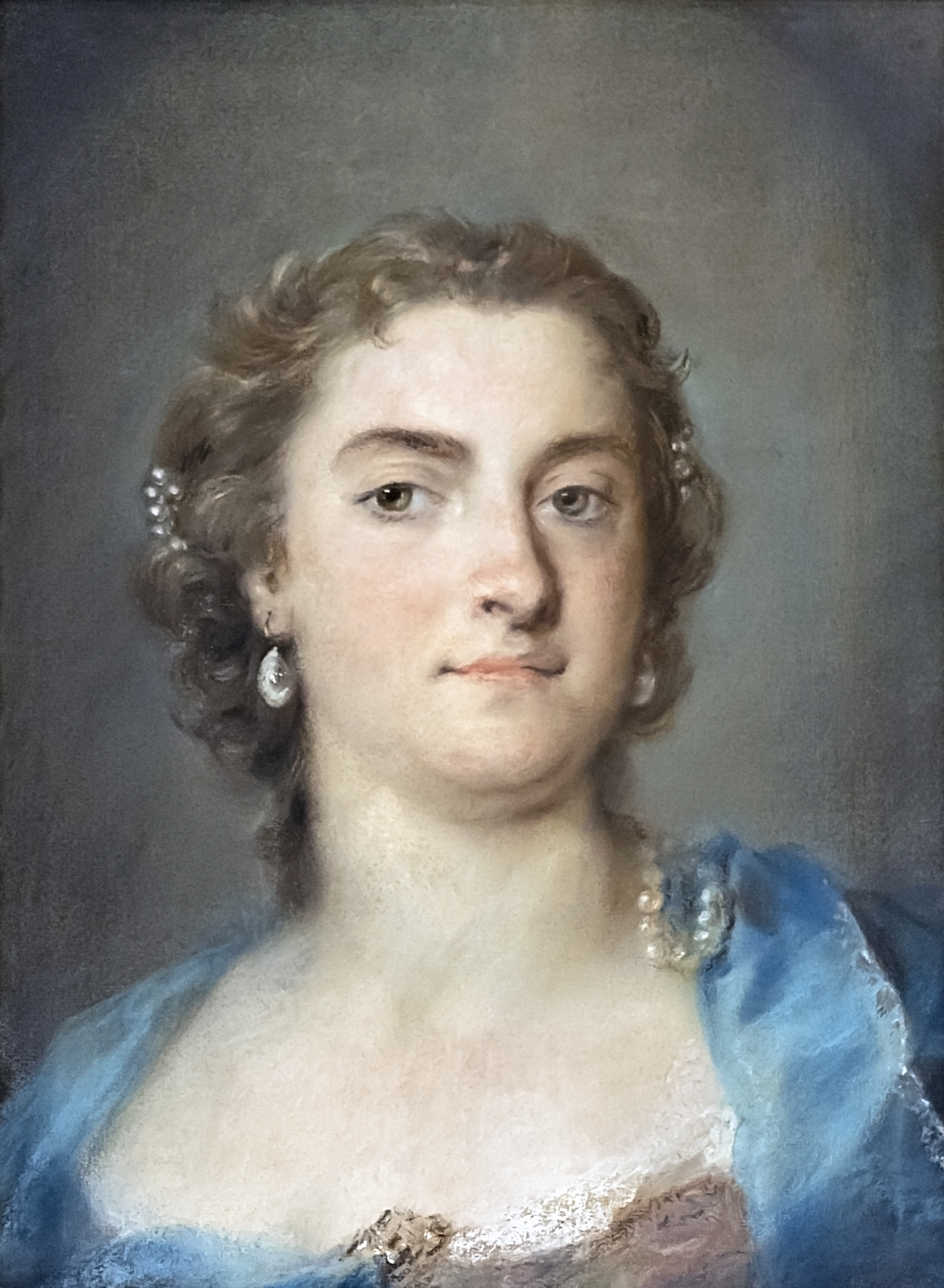
Faustina Bordoni, who created the role of Alceste.

The opera was well-received and had nineteen performances in its initial run, a mark of success for those times. Many audience members were extremely enthusiastic about the singers. One of Handel's most loyal supporters, Mary Delany, wrote to her sister that she had attended Admeto with a friend who "was driven out of her senses" by the singing of Faustina, Cuzzoni and Senesino. At the conclusion of one of Cuzzoni's arias at a performance of the original run, a man in the gallery called out "Damn her: she has got a nest of nightingales in her belly", while one aristocratic patron wrote in her programme beside Cuzzoni's name "She is a devil of a singer".

However, some members of the London audience had become fiercely partisan in favouring either Bordoni or Cuzzoni and disliking the other and at the performance of Admeto on 4 April 1727 with members of the royal family present, elements of the audience were extremely unruly, hissing and interrupting the performance with cat-calls when the "rival" to their favourite was performing, causing public scandal. Cuzzoni issued a public apology to the royal family through one of her supporters:

..Cuzzoni had been publicly told...she was to be hissed off the stage on Tuesday; she was in such concern at this, that she had a great mind not to sing, but I...positively ordered her not to quit the stage, but let them do what they would...and she owns now that if she had not had that order she would have quitted the stage when they cat-called her to such a degree in one song, that she was not heard one note, which provoked the people that liked her so much, that they were not able to get the better of their resentment, but would not suffer the Faustina to speak afterwards.

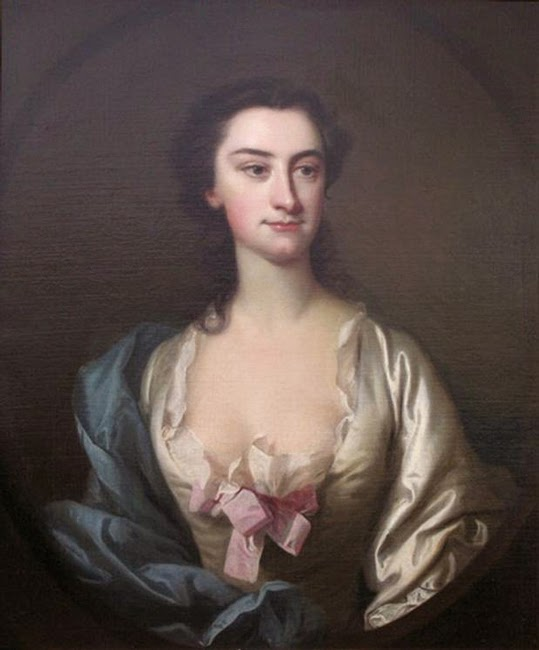
Francesca Cuzzoni, who created the role of Antigona.

This sort of disturbance continued however, climaxing that June in a performance at the academy of an opera by Giovanni Bononcini, Astianatte. With royalty again present in the person of the Princess of Wales, Cuzzoni and Faustina were onstage together and members of the audience who were supporters of one of the prima donnas were loudly protesting and hissing whenever the other one sang. Actual fist fights broke out in the audience between rival groups of "fans" and Cuzzoni and Faustina stopped singing, began trading insults and finally came to blows onstage and had to be dragged apart. The performance was abandoned, creating an enormous scandal reported gleefully in newspapers and pamphlets, satirized in John Gay's The Beggar's Opera of 1728, and tainting the entire reputation of Italian opera in London with disrepute in the eyes of many.

After the 19 performances in its first season, over the time from September 1727 to January 1732, the opera received 16 additional performances. Admeto was revived in 1754 and received 5 additional performances. The last, 6 April 1754, proved to be the last opera performance that Handel saw of his own operas in his lifetime. As with all Baroque opera seria, Admeto went unperformed for many years, but with the revival of interest in Baroque music and historically informed musical performance since the 1960s,Admeto, like all Handel operas, receives performances at festivals and opera houses today. Among other performances, Admeto was produced at the Handel Festival, Halle in 2006, at the Göttingen International Handel Festival in 2009, at the Leipzig Opera in 2010, and was performed at the Theater an der Wien in 2014.

The Royal Academy of Music collapsed at the end of the 1728 - 29 season, partly due to the huge fees paid to the star singers, and Cuzzoni and Faustina both left London for engagements in continental Europe. Handel started a new opera company with a new prima donna, Anna Strada. One of Handel's librettists, Paolo Rolli, wrote in a letter (the original is in Italian) that Handel said that Strada "sings better than the two who have left us, because one of them (Faustina) never pleased him at all and he would like to forget the other (Cuzzoni)."

== Recordings ==
=== Audio recording ===
Admeto discography
Year	Cast Admeto, Alceste, Antigona, Ercole, Trasimede	Conductor, orchestra	Label
1978	René Jacobs, Rachel Yakar, Jill Gomez, Ulrik Cold, James Bowman	Alan Curtis, Il Complesso Barocco	EMI Classics 1C 163-30 808/812

=== Video recordings ===
Year	Cast Admetus, Alceste, Antigona, Ercole, Trasimede	Conductor, orchestra	Producer	Label
2006	Matthias Rexroth, Romelia Lichtenstein, Mechthild Bach, Raimund Nolte, Tim Mead	Howard Arman, Händelfestspielorchester Hallé	Axel Köhler	Arthaus Musik 101257
2009	Tim Mead, Marie Arnet, Kirsten Blaise, William Berger, David Bates	Nicholas McGegan, Göttingen Festival Orchestra	Doris Doerrie	C Major 702008
