= Antonio Baldi (singer) =

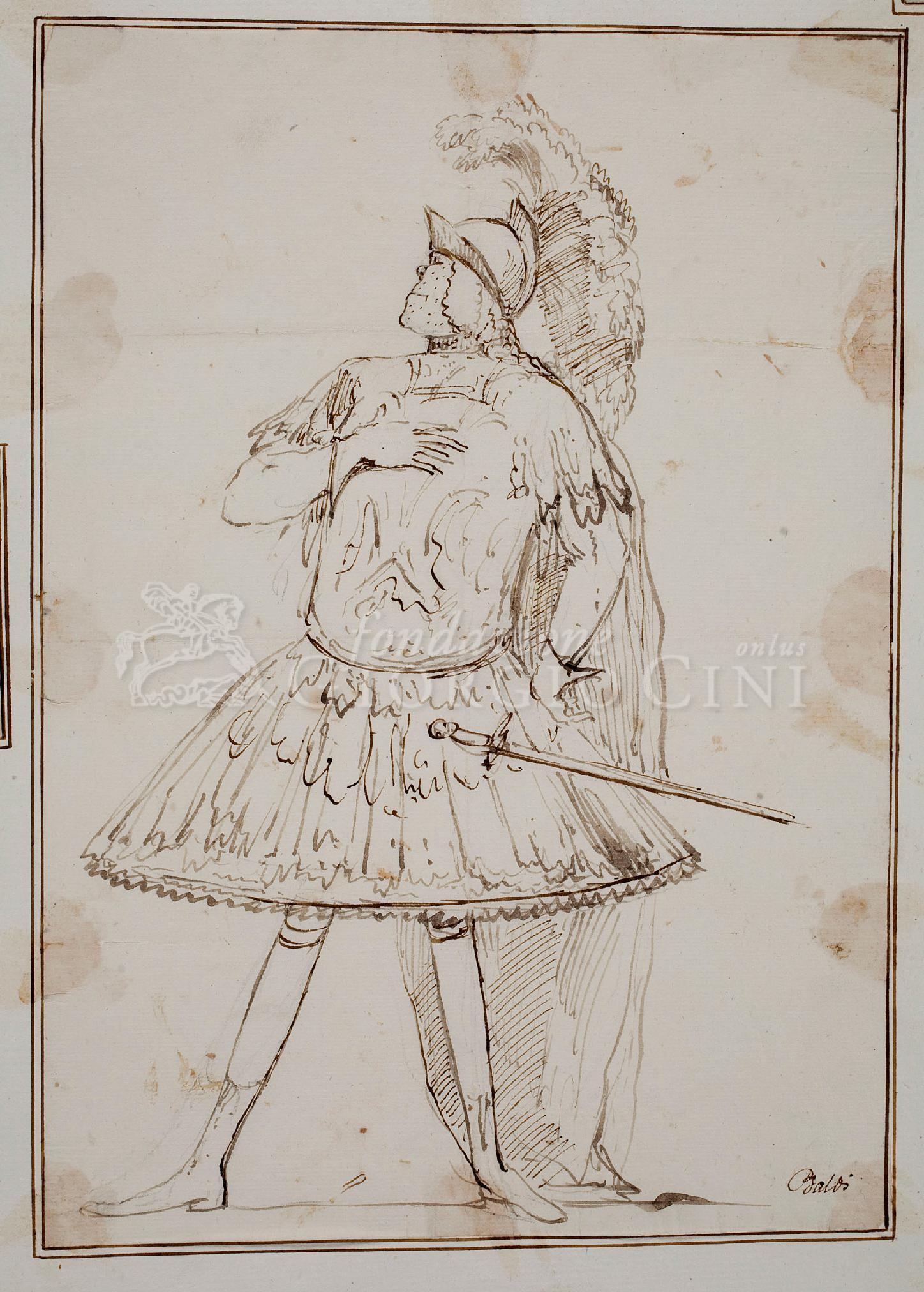
c. 1730 caricature of Antonio Baldi. Drawing by Antonio Maria Zanetti.

Antonio Baldi (fl. 1714 – c. 1735) was an Italian alto castrato.

== Biography ==
Antonio Baldi was born in Cortona in an unknown year. In 1714 he starred as Berardo in Andrea Stefano Fiorè's La innocenza giustificata at the Teatro Santa Cecilia, Palermo. He was active as a singer in Palermo through 1716; also performing there as Zoroastro in Il Nino (1715, possibly composed by Carlo Francesco Pollarolo) and Nino in Apostolo Zeno and Pietro Pariati's L'Astarto (1716, unknown composer). He worked in operas in Venice from 1722-1724 at the Teatro San Giovanni Grisostomo; performing in the premieres of Carlo Grua's Romolo e Tazio (1722, as Tatius), Giovanni Maria Capelli's Mitridate, re di Ponto (1723, as Pharnaces), Francesco Gasparini's Gli equivoci d'amore e d'innocenza (1723, as Ernesto), and Michelangelo Gasparini's Il più fedel tra gli amici (1724, as Araspe).

In 1723 Baldi portrayed Cosroe in the pastiche Ormisda at the Teatro del Falcone in Genoa. From 1725 to 1728 he was an opera singer at the King's Theatre, Haymarket in London. At that theatre he performed as a member of George Frideric Handel's Royal Academy of Music company; making his debut in the pastiche Elpidia by Leonardo Vinci and Giuseppe Maria Orlandini. He performed in the world premieres of several of Handel's operas; including Scipione (1726, as Scipione), Alessandro (1726, as Tassile), Riccardo Primo (1727, as Oronte), Admeto (1727, as Trasimede), Siroe (1728, as Medarse), and Tolomeo (1728, as Alessandro). He also performed the role of Tigrane in the premiere of the revised version of Handel's Radamisto (1728).

From 1729 to 1735 Baldi sang regularly in Venice. In 1734 he portrayed Anassandro in the premiere of Geminiano Giacomelli's Merope, and Megabise in Johann Adolph Hasse's Artaserse in Venice. After 1735 nothing is known of the singer, including when and where he died.
