= Gaetano Berenstadt =

Italian opera singer

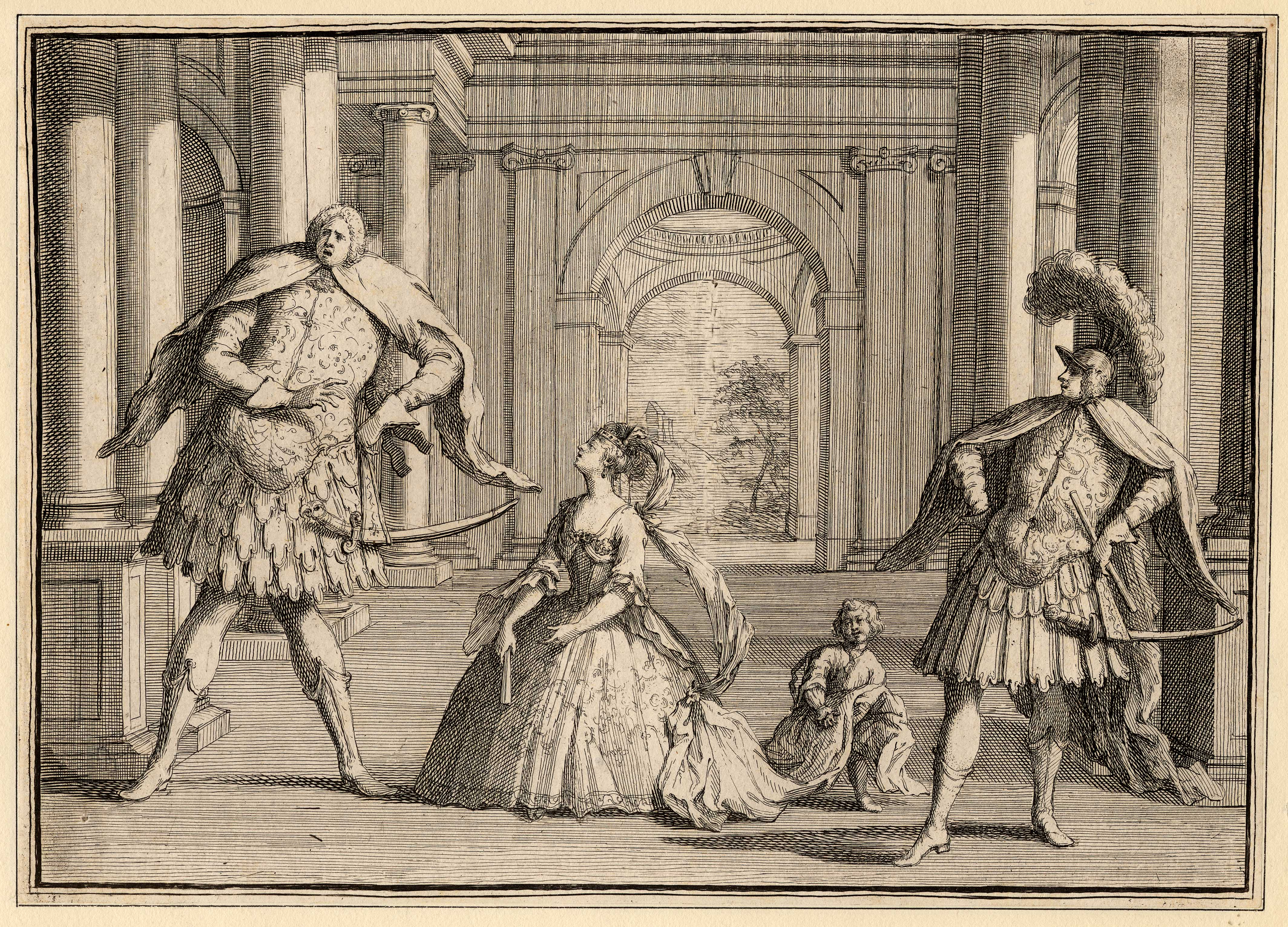
A caricature of a performance of Handel's Flavio, featuring Berenstadt on the far right, the soprano Francesca Cuzzoni in the centre and Senesino on the left.

Gaetano Berenstadt (7 June 1687 – buried 9 December 1734) was an Italian alto castrato who is best remembered for his association with the composer George Frideric Handel. Berenstadt created roles in three of Handel's operas. Berenstadt's parents were German and his father was timpanist to the Grand Duke of Tuscany. By the end of his 27-year-long career Berenstadt had sung in 55 dramatic works, 33 of which were newly composed.

Berenstadt was born in Florence. A pupil of Francesco Pistocchi, after singing at Naples and Bologna, Berenstadt visited London in 1717, where he performed the role of Argante in a revival of Handel's Rinaldo. The original bass part, sung by Giuseppe Maria Boschi, was transposed up for Berenstadt's alto voice and in this revised version the character has three new arias composed for Berenstadt to sing. After returning to Italy to sing at Rome and Milan Berenstadt came back to London in 1722 to sing for the composers of the Royal Academy of Music (1719). It was at this time that he created the roles of Tolomeo in Handel's Giulio Cesare, the title role in Flavio, and the role of Adelberto in Ottone. He also performed in operas by Bononcini and Ariosti.

Berenstadt left London in 1724 and returned to Italy. In 1726 he began to sing music by well-known galant composers at Rome and other Italian cities. He created roles in three works by Leonardo Vinci and two in new compositions by Johann Adolph Hasse. His final stage appearances were at Florence in 1734. He published some music in his last years, during which he also suffered from rheumatism. He died and was buried in Florence.

42 of Berenstadt's letters survive. They are mostly concerned with his love of obscure books and fine arts: he was a frequent buyer and seller of both, and compiled an extensive library that contained many incunabula. The librettist and poet Apostolo Zeno described him as possessing "an excellent knowledge of our best authors and superb taste in the realms of Italian poetry and eloquence".

18th-century musicologist Charles Burney described Berenstadt as an "evirato of a huge unwieldy figure". In operas, he usually took the role of villainous tyrants: it would seem that his physical bulk made him unsuitable as a portrayer of a young lover or a woman, and he never portrayed a female character. The arias composed for him show that his voice possessed only a limited range but considerable vocal virtuosity. Stepwise movement is often avoided in these arias, which consist of sudden, quick leaps. The character's roles contain very few slow or pathetic arias. In London his roles consisted of three arias, though the parts composed for him in Italy contain four to eight solo arias or duets.
