= Handel Festival, Halle =

Music festival in Halle, Germany

Handel Festival
- Genre: Music mostly by G. F. Handel
- Frequency: annual
- Locations: Halle an der Saale, many locations
- Inaugurated: 1922; 104 years ago
- Website: www.haendelfestspiele.halle.de/en/festspiele/

The Handel Festival (in German: Händel-Festspiele) in Halle an der Saale, Saxony-Anhalt, is an international music festival concentrating on the music of George Frideric Handel in the composer's birthplace. It was founded on May 25, 1922 and it grew into a center of Handel studies and performance in Europe. Especially Handel's operas have been staged regularly, some of them as first revivals.

== History ==
The first Handel Festival in Halle was conducted in 1922, three years after the Handel Festival in Göttingen. It showed the oratorios Semele and Susanna, the opera Orlando furioso arranged by Hans Joachim Moser, and smaller works by Handel and other Halle composers of the 16th, 17th and 18th century. A Händel-Gesellschaft (Handel Society) was founded in 1925 and staged a second festival in 1929, directed by Hermann Abert. The 250th anniversary of the composer in 1935 was the occasion for a third festival, termed "Reichs-Händelgedenktage" by the Nazis. After World War II Erich Neuß, Max Schneider, Herbert Koch and others founded a Hallische Händel-Gesellschaft (Halle Handel Society), which organized a fourth festival in 1948 in collaboration with the Landestheater, the Evangelische Kirchenmusikschule (Academy of Protestant Church Music) and the Musikhochschule. It took place in the Handel House, completed shortly before.

Since 1952 the festival has been organized annually by the city of Halle, in collaboration with scholars of the Martin-Luther-Universität Halle-Wittenberg and the Hallische Händel-Ausgabe. The Handel Prize has been awarded as part of the festival first in 1956, since 1993 annually.

The Opernhaus Halle has contributed at least one of Handel's operas each time, in addition a regular guest performance has been staged at the Goethe-Theater in Bad Lauchstädt, the only extant theater from the poet's time. The festival's orchestra is since 1993 the Händel-Festspielorchester, playing period instruments, conducted by Howard Arman until 2007, when Bernhard Forck took over. An additional feature of the festival is the performance of works of composers from Sachsen-Anhalt who were close to Handel.

Since 1922, 34 of Handel's 42 operas have been staged in more than 100 productions. The first modern professional performance of Rinaldo in 1954 was conducted by Horst-Tanu Margraf; Radamisto followed in 1955, Poro in 1956, Imeneo in 1960, Scipione in 1965. Faramondo was revived in 1976. Handel's first opera Almira was performed in the Goethe-Theater in 1994. Tolomeo was produced and recorded in 1998, probably the first performance of the work with period instruments, conducted by Howard Arman. The 2006 production of Admeto, directed by Axel Köhler and conducted by Arman, was recorded. The pasticcio Giove in Argo was performed in 2007 after its premiere that season at the Handel Festival, Göttingen. The 2009 festival staged the operas Floridante and Serse, the pastiche Anaesthesia, also the oratorios Theodora, Messiah, Belshazzar and Israel in Egypt.

The festival was cancelled in 2013 because of the widespread floods that year.

== Literature ==
- Karin Zauft: Händel und die Händel-Festspiele in Halle, German/English, Mitteldeutscher Verlag, Halle 2001
