= Luigi Antinori =

Italian opera singer

Luigi Antinori (c. 1697 – before 6 March 1734) was an Italian operatic tenor.

Antinori was born at Bologna about 1697. He was one of the best tenor singers of the beginning of the 18th century, with a voice of pure and penetrating quality, and having acquired an excellent method of using it.

He came to London in 1725 and sang in Elisa, an anonymous opera, and in Elpidia, by Leonardo Vinci and others, a pasticcio given by George Frideric Handel, in which Antinori took the place of Borosini, who sang in it at first. In the season of 1726 he appeared in Handel's Scipione and Alessandro. After that season, he returned to Italy. He sang in Venice (1726 in Nicola Porpora’s Imeneo in Atene, and again 1731), Livorno (1725, 1730–31), Turin (1728), Genoa (1728, 1732), Mantua (1729), and Reggio nell’Emilia (1732). In the 1733/34 season he performed at the Teatro della Pergola, Florence in operas by Giovanni Battista Pergolesi and Alessandro Scarlatti. In a letter dated 6 March 1734, the impresario of the Pergola, Luca Casimiro degli Albizzi, gives a record of Antinori's recent death.
