= Faustina Bordoni =

Italian opera singer (1697–1781)

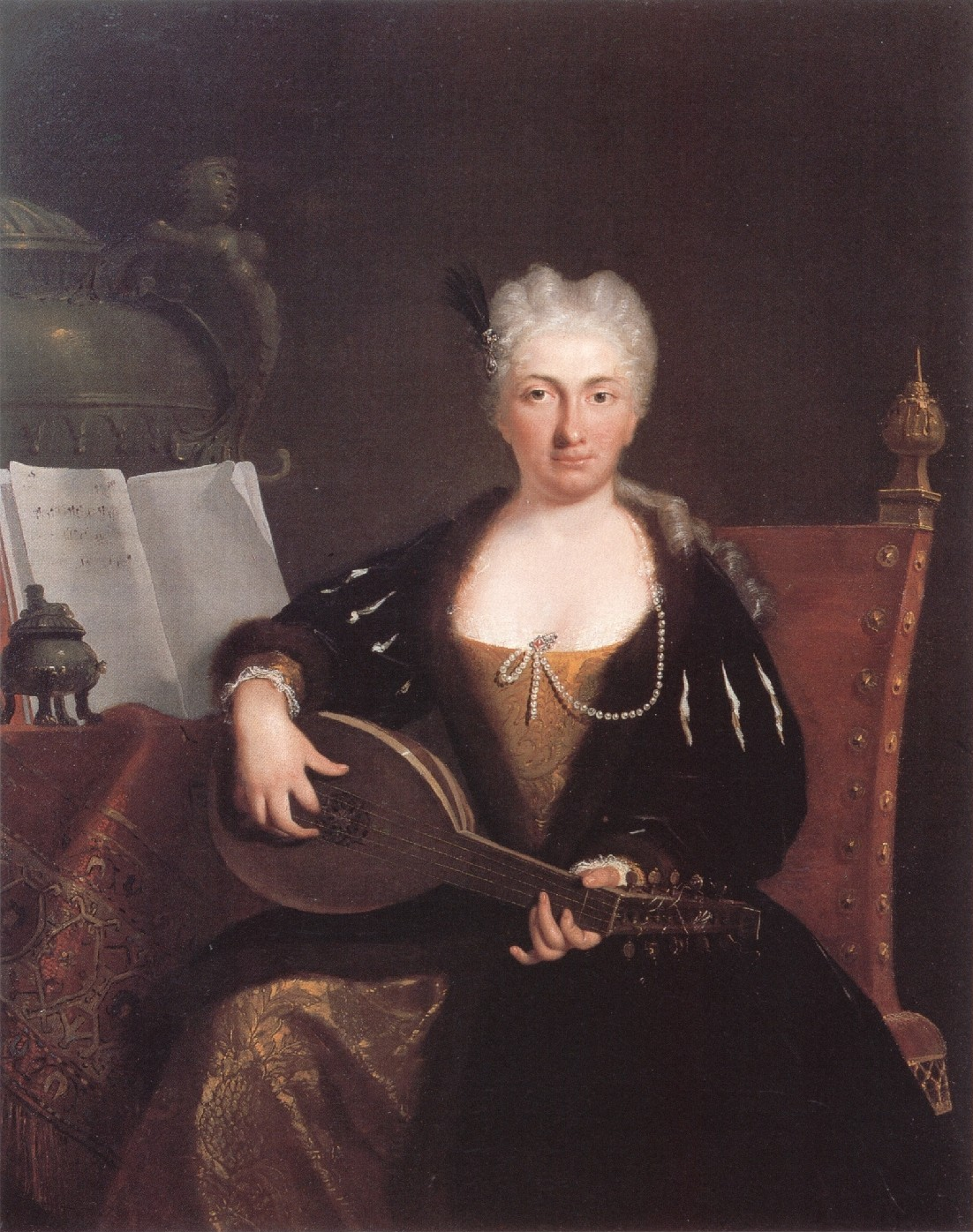
Faustina Bordoni, by Bartolomeo Nazari

Faustina Bordoni (30 March 1697 – 4 November 1781) was an Italian mezzo-soprano. Her husband was the German composer Johann Adolph Hasse; the Johann Adolph Hasse Museum in Hamburg is dedicated to him and partly to Bordoni.

== Early career ==
She was born in Venice and brought up under the protection of the aristocratic brother composers Alessandro and Benedetto Marcello. Her singing teacher was another composer, Michelangelo Gasparini. For many years in the service of the Elector Palatine, she made her operatic debut at Venice in 1716 in Carlo Francesco Pollarolo's Ariodante, singing in her home city until 1725 in operas by Albinoni, the Gasparini brothers, Giacomelli, Leonardo Leo, Giuseppe Maria Orlandini, the Pollarolos, father and son, and Leonardo Vinci, amongst others. In 1718 and 1719 in Venice she sang alongside Francesca Cuzzoni, later to become her great rival. During this period she also performed several times at Reggio nell'Emilia, Naples and Parma, and at least once in Milan, Modena and Florence. After her German début in 1723, singing in Pietro Torri's Griselda at Munich, she was a great favourite north of the Alps during the 1720s, also enjoying great success in Vienna (1725–26). Her nickname was the "new siren", and she was commonly known simply as "Faustina".

== "The Rival Queens" ==
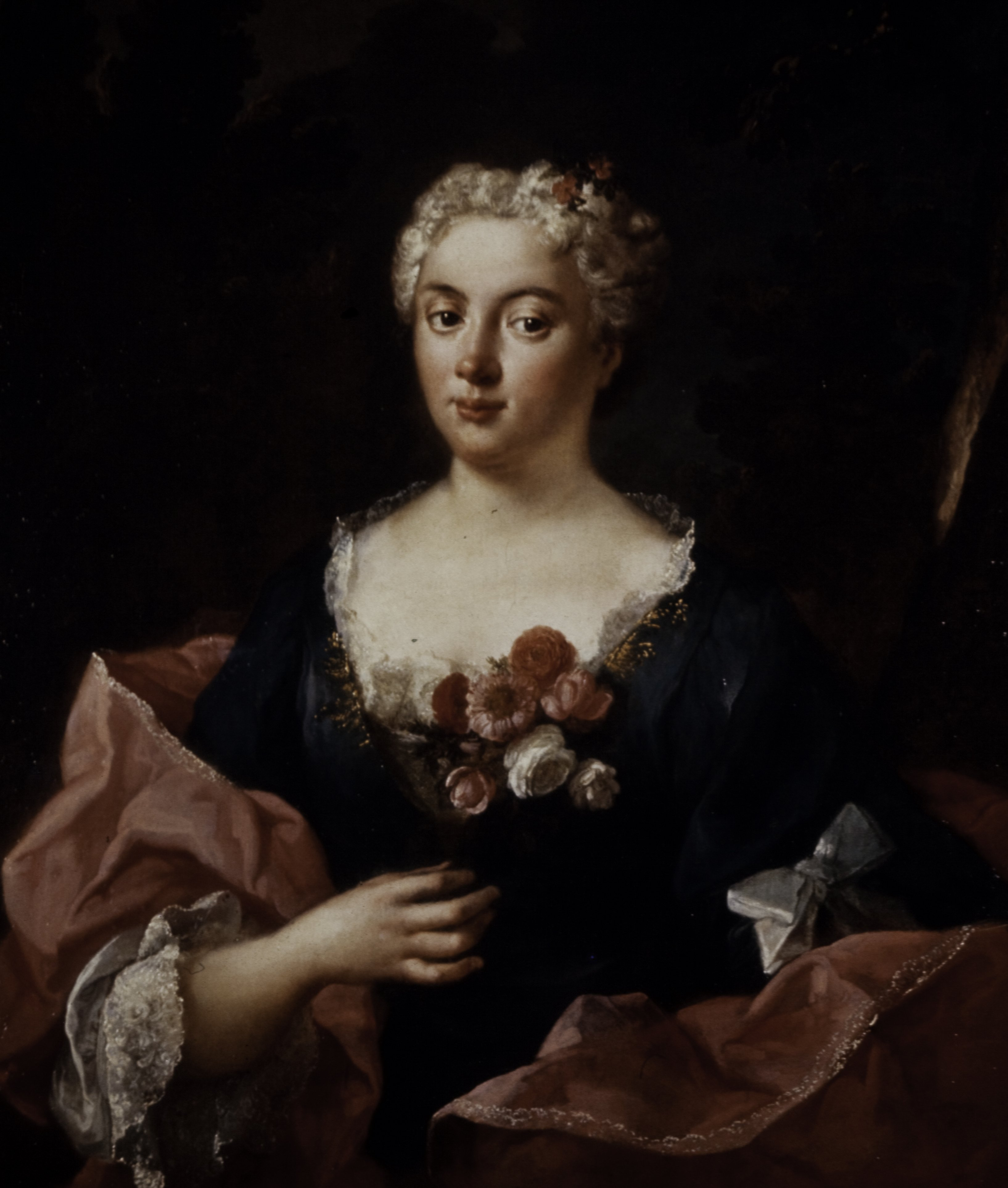
Portrait of Faustina Bordoni, by Ludovico Mazzanti. (1740) Minneapolis Institute of Art.

Her London début, as Rossane in Handel's Alessandro, took place on 5 May 1726, alongside Senesino and Cuzzoni. During the next two seasons she created four more Handel roles: Alceste in Admeto and Pulcheria in Riccardo Primo (both 1727), and Emira in Siroe and Elisa in Tolomeo (1728). She also sang in a revival of Radamisto, and in operas by Ariosti and Giovanni Bononcini. In a performance of the latter's Astianatte on 6 June 1727, a riot broke out in the audience between her followers and those of her 'rival' Cuzzoni in the King's Theatre, Haymarket, in front of Caroline, Princess of Wales. This furore seized the public imagination and a great deal of journalistic exaggeration – the pamphleteer John Arbuthnot published "The DEVIL to pay at St. JAMES's: Or A full and true ACCOUNT of a most horrid and bloody BATTLE between Madam FAUSTINA and Madam CUZZONI", in which he lambasted the two ladies: "TWO of a Trade seldom or ever agree … But who would have thought the Infection should reach the Hay-market and inspire Two Singing Ladies to pull each other's Coiffs, to the no small Disquiet of the Directors, who (God help them) have enough to do to keep Peace and Quietness between them. … I shall not determine who is the Aggressor, but take the surer Side, and wisely pronounce them both in Fault; for it is certainly an apparent Shame that two such well bred Ladies should call Bitch and Whore, should scold and fight like any Billingsgates." Recent research has shown, however, that it was the singers' supporters who were behaving badly, rather than the singers themselves, who had worked together before in Italy and continued to work together for the Royal Academy until the directors were forced to dissolve it in 1728 owing to mounting debts.

== Later career ==
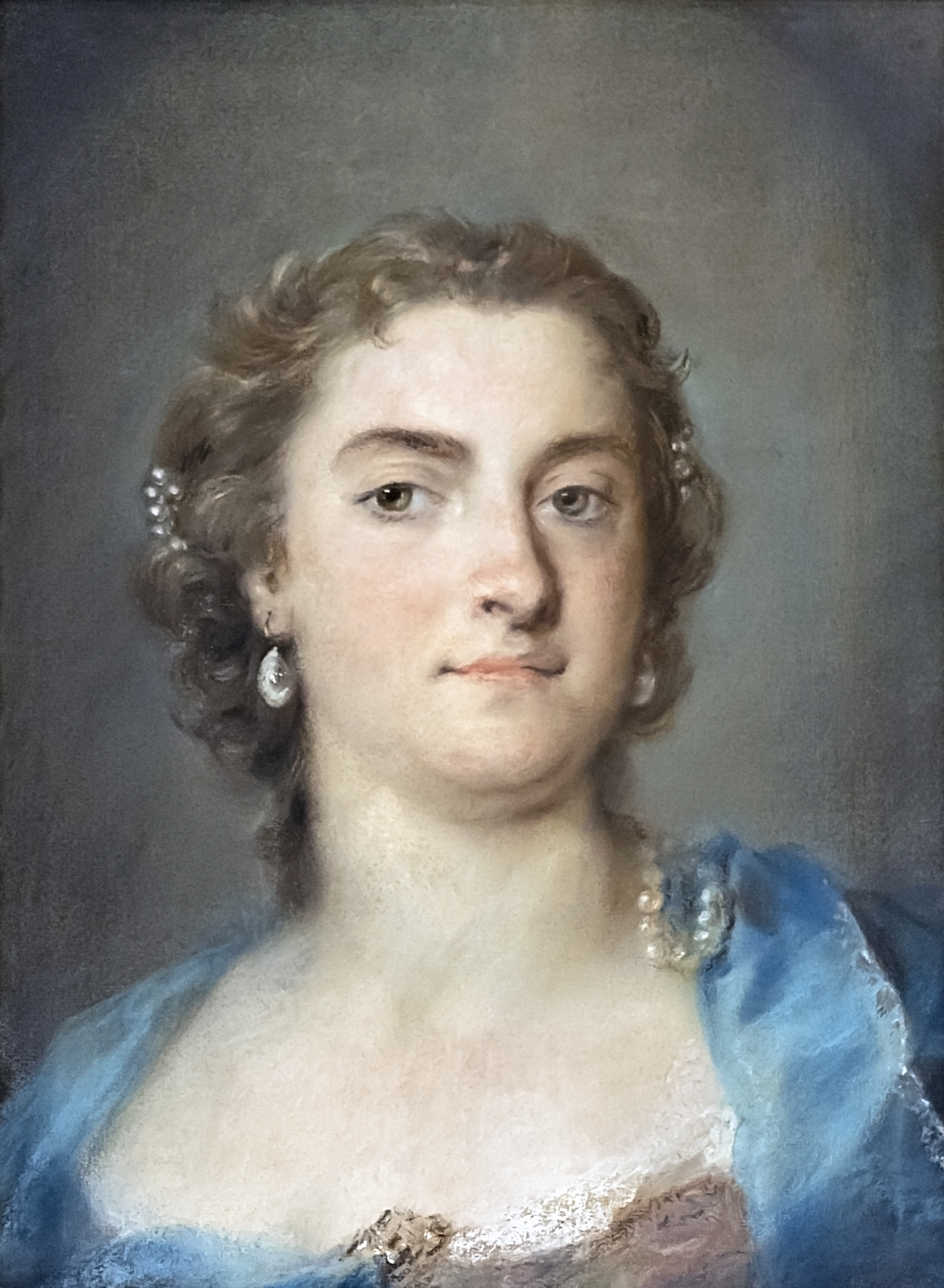
Faustina Bordoni by Rosalba Carriera

Unlike Cuzzoni, Faustina never returned to England. During the years 1728–1732, she was again much in evidence on the stages of major Italian cities, especially Venice. In 1730, she married the German composer, Johann Adolf Hasse, and the following year the couple were summoned to the court of Augustus the Strong at Dresden, where Faustina enjoyed a great success in her husband's opera Cleofide. They were described by the famous librettist Metastasio as "truly an exquisite couple".

Hasse remained at the Saxon court for more than thirty years, and his wife sang in at least fifteen of the operas he composed between Caio Fabricio in 1734 and Ciro riconosciuto (1751). Faustina was, however, permitted to make many long trips to Italy, appearing again in Naples, Venice, Parma and elsewhere in operas by Pergolesi, Porpora and Vinci, alongside those of her husband. Though she retired from the theatre in 1751, Faustina kept her salary and title of virtuosa da camera to the Elector until the death of Augustus' successor, Frederick Augustus II in 1763.

At this point, she and her husband moved to Vienna, before removing finally to Venice in 1773. Mozart gave her a visit in 1769. They had two daughters, both trained singers. On a visit in 1772, Charles Burney described Faustina as "a short, brown, sensible, and lively old woman ... with good remains … of that beauty for which she was so much celebrated in her youth." Unlike her rival Cuzzoni, who died in poverty, Faustina had a happy and prosperous old age. She is buried together with his husband in the church of San Marcuola.

== Bordoni as an artist ==
The composer Quantz gave a description of Bordoni's qualities, as given to Charles Burney:

Faustina had a mezzo-soprano voice, that was less clear than penetrating. Her compass now was only from B flat to G in alt; but after this time she extended its limits downward. She possessed what the Italians call un cantar granito; her execution was articulate and brilliant. She had a fluent tongue for pronouncing words rapidly and distinctly, and a flexible throat for divisions, with so beautiful a shake that she put it in motion upon short notice, just when she would. The passages might be smooth, or by leaps, or consisting of iterations of the same note; their execution was equally easy to her as to any instrument whatever. She was, doubtless, the first who introduced with success a swift repetition of the same note. She sang adagios with great passion and expression, but was not equally successful if such deep sorrow were to be impressed on the hearer as might require dragging, sliding, or notes of syncopation and tempo rubato. She had a very happy memory in arbitrary changes and embellishments, and a clear and quick judgment in giving to words their full value and expression. In her action she was very happy; and as her performance possessed that flexibility of muscles and face-play which constitute expression, she succeeded equally well in furious, tender, and amorous parts. In short, she was born for singing and acting.

Burney himself remarked on the strength of the note E (E5) in her voice, and that half of the arias written for her by Handel are in E or A (minor or major), keys which could give this note particular prominence.
