= Francesca Cuzzoni =

Italian operatic soprano

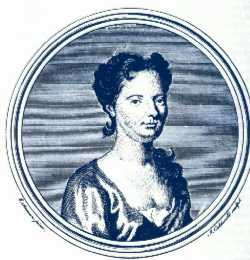
Francesca Cuzzoni, by Caldwell after Seeman

Francesca Cuzzoni (2 April 1696 – 19 June 1778) was an Italian operatic soprano of the Baroque era.

== Early career ==
Cuzzoni was born in Parma. Her father, Angelo, was a professional violinist, and her singing teacher was Francesco Lanzi. She made her debut in her home city in 1714, singing in La virtù coronata, o Il Fernando by an unknown composer. In 1716–17 she sang at Bologna in operas by Bassani, Buini, Gasparini and Giuseppe Maria Orlandini. By the 1717–18 season she had been appointed virtuosa da camera ("chamber soloist") to Violante Beatrice, Grand Princess of Tuscany, performing at Florence, Siena, Genoa, Mantua, and Reggio nell'Emilia in operas by Orlandini and Carlo Francesco Pollarolo, and in Vivaldi's Scanderbeg . She also made her Venetian debut in 1718, singing the role of Dalinda in Pollarolo's Ariodante, in which, for the first time, she appeared on the same stage as Faustina Bordoni, later her great rival. They also sang together in Venice the following year in Michelangelo Gasparini's Il Lamano, and in Il pentimento generoso by Stefano Andrea Fiorè, in which the redoubtable duo were joined by the famous castrato Antonio Maria Bernacchi. Having appeared at Florence and Milan (1719), Bologna, Florence and Turin (1720), and Padua (1721), she returned to Venice for the season of 1721–22, singing in five operas, including Orlandini's Nerone: she sang Poppea, Faustina Octavia, while the fine contralto Diana Vico was Agrippina.

== Cuzzoni's first visit to London ==
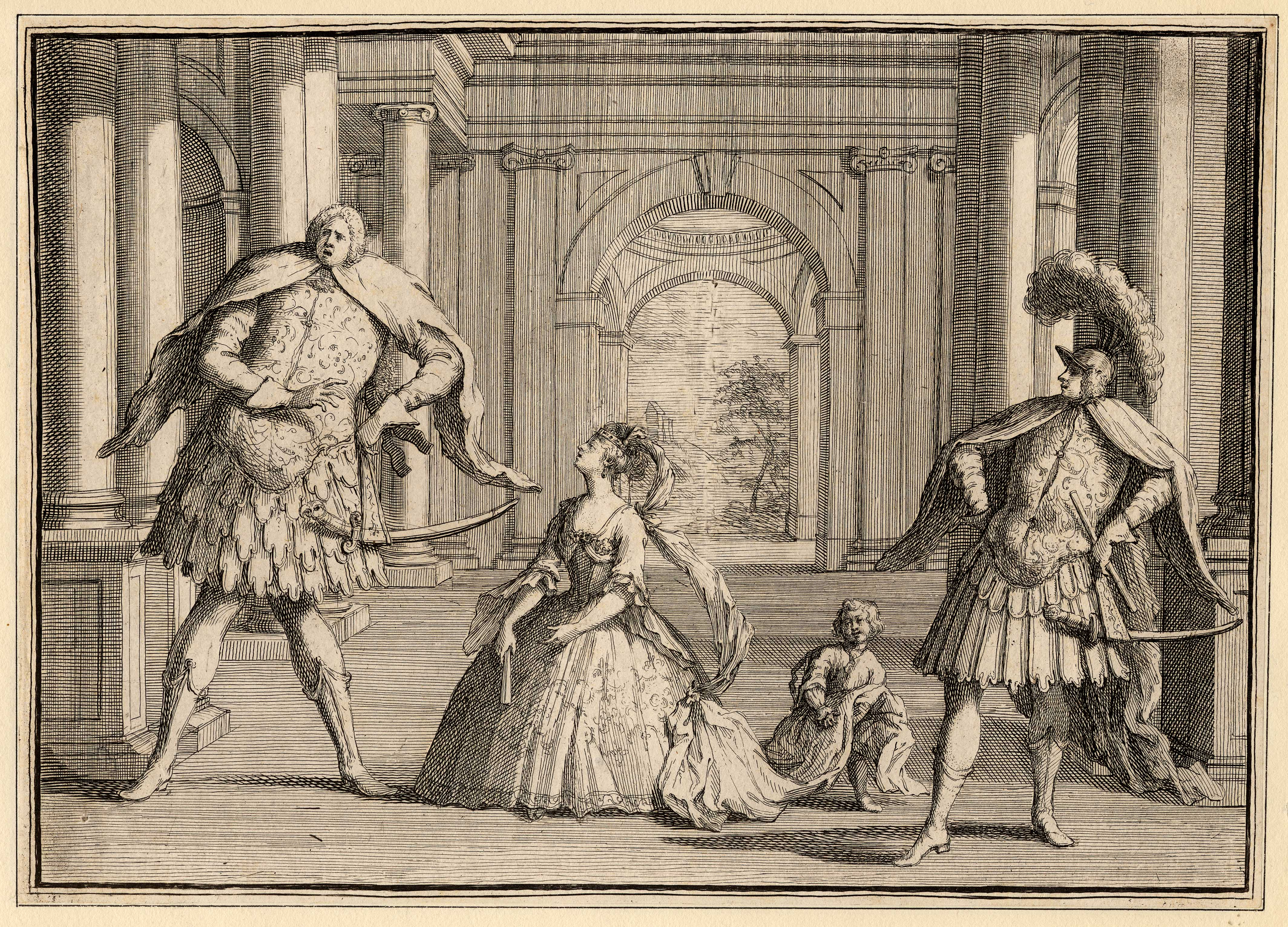
A caricature of a performance of Handel's Flavio, featuring Gaetano Berenstadt on the far right, Cuzzoni in the centre and Senesino on the left.

Cuzzoni's arrival in the English capital was keenly anticipated in the press. Though the "London Journal" for 27 October 1722 reported that "Mrs. Cotsona [sic], an extraordinary Italian Lady, ... is expected daily", she apparently found time to marry Pietro Giuseppe Sandoni during her journey, and did not make her debut in London until 12 January 1723, creating the role of Teofane in Handel's Ottone at the King's Theatre, Haymarket. To an aria in her role, "Falsa immagine", there is attached a famous story, vividly illustrating both her character and that of the composer. The part not having been originally intended for her (but perhaps for Maddalena Salvai), at rehearsal she refused to sing this, her first aria. According to the historian John Mainwaring, Handel replied: "Oh! Madame I know well that you are a real she-devil, but I hereby give you notice, me, that I am Beelzebub, the Chief of Devils." Mainwaring continued: "With this, he took her up by the waist, and, if she made any more words, swore that he would fling her out of the window." According to Burney, her singing of this aria "fixed her reputation as an expressive and pathetic singer", and her success was such that the price of half-guinea opera tickets reportedly shot up to four guineas. By the time of her benefit concert only two months later, some noblemen were believed to be giving her fifty guineas a ticket. Her salary was also large: £2000 a season. Her appearance was no recommendation: Burney described her as "short and squat, with a doughy cross face, but fine complexion; ... not a good actress; dressed ill; and was silly and fantastical."

Cuzzoni was a member of Handel's Royal Academy of Music (1719) for its remaining five years. He created nine roles for her, the most famous today being Cleopatra in Giulio Cesare and the title-role in Rodelinda. In the latter, she wore a brown silk dress trimmed with silver, "with the vulgarity and indecorum of which all the old ladies were much scandalized, the young adopted it as a fashion, so universally, that it seemed a national uniform for youth and beauty" (Burney). For this company she also sang in seven operas by Attilio Ariosti, four by Giovanni Bononcini and two pasticcios. The enthusiasm of her supporters led to quarrels with the fans of Senesino, and later with those of Faustina Bordoni, whose London debut was in Handel's Alessandro (1726). In this opera the importance of the two ladies' roles had to be very carefully balanced, which at one point in the opera's plot made Senesino, playing the name part, look a complete fool. Her rivalry with Faustina, fanned by the press, eventually became scandalous when, in a performance of Bononcini's Astianatte (6 June 1727), attended by princess Caroline, "Hissing on one Side, and Clapping on the other" gave rise to "Catcalls, and other great indecencies". Such was the rumpus that the performance, and the rest of that opera season, were abandoned. The satirical pamphleteers had a field day, depicting the two prime donne exchanging insults and pulling at one another's head-dresses, though recent research has revealed that it was the ladies' rival supporters, rather than the singers themselves, who were the cause of the disturbance. They were further lampooned in John Gay's The Beggar's Opera, which was premiered on 29 January 1728. In spite of such fracas they continued to sing together for Handel until his company's demise in June of that year.

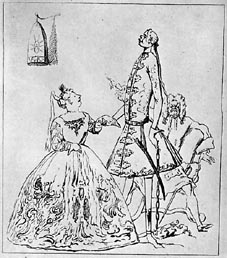
A caricature of Cuzzoni, Farinelli and Heidegger, by Goupy after Ricci, c1729-30. In the accompanying verse Cuzzoni is referred to as "thou warbling bird", Farinelli as "thou tuneful scarecrow".

== A continental interlude ==
Cuzzoni spent the winter of 1728-29 in Vienna at the invitation of Count Kinsky (Imperial Ambasasador to London), but, in spite of her great success there was not engaged by the opera because she demanded too high a salary. Later in 1729 she sang at Modena and Venice, and in the autumn of that year, Handel's impresario Heidegger wished to engage both her and Faustina for the new "Second Royal Academy". Handel had had enough of both of them, however, and so Cuzzoni went instead to Bologna, Naples, Piacenza and Venice during 1730-31, and Bologna and Florence again during the following season, when, amongst others, she sang in operas by her husband (she never performed under his name). Their association continued during the carnival seasons of 1733 and 1734, when she appeared at Genoa.

== In London again ==
In 1733, a group of English aristocrats wished to set up an opera company to rival Handel's, and Cuzzoni was one of the first singers they approached. She returned in April 1734, joining the cast of Porpora's Arianna a Nasso. For this company, known as the "Opera of the Nobility", she sang in four more operas by Porpora, and others by Sandoni, Hasse, Orlandini, Veracini, Ciampi, the pasticcio Orfeo and even a version of Handel's Ottone. It would seem that she made less of an impression during this visit, not least due to the presence of the incomparably famous Farinelli in the same company.

== Later career ==
Nonetheless, Cuzzoni was still a force to be reckoned with. After the collapse of the Nobility Opera, she returned to the continent, singing in Florence in 1737-38, and at Turin the following year, when, for one carnival season, she received the huge fee of 8,000 lire. Later that year she sang at Vienna, and seems to have made her last operatic appearances in Hamburg in 1740. On 17 September 1741 the "London Daily Post" reported that Cuzzoni was to be beheaded for poisoning her husband, but, though they had separated by 1742, he did not die until 1748. She sang concerts in Amsterdam in 1742, and by December 1745 had become a court singer in Stuttgart. In debt, a condition she frequently suffered in her later life, she absconded from there to Bologna in 1748. Still needing to perform to pay her creditors, she was again in London in 1750, where Burney heard her "thin cracked voice" in a concert on 18 May. On 2 August of that year Horace Walpole wrote that "old Cuzzoni" had been arrested for a debt of £30, and bailed by the Prince of Wales. On 20 May 1751, the "General Advertiser" gave notice of a final benefit concert for Cuzzoni, accompanied by a letter from the singer in which she wrote: "I am so extremely sensible of the many Obligations I have already received from the Nobility and Gentry of this Kingdom ... that nothing but extreme necessity and a desire of doing justice, could induce me to trouble them again, but being unhappily involved in a few Debts, am extremely desirous of attempting every Thing in my Power to pay them, before I quit England ..."

Of her last years, little is known, save that she returned once more to the continent, and lived a poverty-stricken existence, eking out a living, it is said, making buttons. She died in Bologna. Of the two children she seems to have had by Sandoni, nothing is known - they may have died in infancy.

== Cuzzoni as an artist ==
Clearly, in her prime, Cuzzoni was a singer and artist of the first class. The well-known writer on singing, Giovanni Battista Mancini, gave a glowing testament to her art:

"It is difficult to decide whether she excels more in slow or in rapid airs. A "native warble" enabled her to execute divisions with such facility as to conceal their difficulty. So grateful and touching was her natural tone that she rendered pathetic whatever she sang, when she had the opportunity to unfold the whole volume of her voice. Her power of conducting, sustaining, increasing, and diminishing her notes by minute degrees acquired for her the credit of being a complete mistress of her art. Her trill was perfect: she had a creative fancy, and a command of tempo rubato. Her high notes were unrivaled in clearness and sweetness, and her intonation was so absolutely true that she seemed incapable of singing out of tune. She had a compass of two octaves, C to C in alt. Her style was unaffected, simple, and sympathetic."

Quantz wrote that "her style of singing was innocent and affecting" and that her ornaments "took possession of the soul of every auditor, by her tender and touching expression".
