= List of operas by George Frideric Handel =

Chronological list of George Frideric Handel's musical dramas

George Frideric Handel's operas comprise 42 musical dramas that were written between 1705 and 1741 in various genres. Though his large scale English-language works written for the theatre are technically oratorios and not operas, several of them, such as Semele (1744), have become an important part of the opera repertoire. Other English-language oratorios which are sometimes fully staged as operas include Saul, Samson, Hercules, Belshazzar, Theodora and Jephtha.

Parnasso in festa, a festa teatrale composed by Handel to an Italian text and performed in London to celebrate the royal wedding of Anne, Princess Royal and Prince William of Orange in 1734, has many characteristics of an opera.

== List of works ==
List of operas by George Frideric Handel. All are opera seria in three acts, unless otherwise stated.
HWV	Title	Libretto	Première date	Première place, theatre	Modern revival	Notes
1	Almira (Der in Krohnen erlangte Glücks-Wechsel, oder: Almira, Königin von Castilien)	Friedrich Christian Feustking, after Giulio Pancieri	8 January 1705	Hamburg, Oper am Gänsemarkt	4 June 1994, Handel Festival, Bad Lauchstädt	Some music lost; announced as a Singspiel but has no spoken dialogue
2	Nero (Die durch Blut und Mord erlangete Liebe)	Friedrich Christian Feustking	25 February 1705	Hamburg, Oper am Gänsemarkt		Music lost
3	Florindo (Der beglückte Florindo)	Hinrich Hinsch	January 1708	Hamburg, Oper am Gänsemarkt		1 arias preserved
4	Daphne (Die verwandelte Daphne)	Hinrich Hinsch	January 1708	Hamburg, Oper am Gänsemarkt		A sequel to Florindo, intended to be performed on the day after it. 1 aria and 1 chorus preserved
5	Rodrigo (Vincer se stesso è la maggior vittoria)	After Francesco Silvani's II duello d'Amore e di Vendetta; Italian libretto	Autumn 1707	Florence, Teatro di via del Cocomero	1984, Innsbruck	Some music is lost
6	Agrippina	Vincenzo Grimani	26 December 1709	Venice, Teatro San Giovanni Grisostomo	1943, Halle	
7a/b	Rinaldo	Giacomo Rossi, after Aaron Hill, after Tasso, La Gerusalemme liberata Italian libretto	24 February 1711	London, Queen's Theatre	June 1954, Handel Festival, Halle	HWV 7b is the 1731 revision; the libretto of a revision of 1717 also exists
8a/b/c	Il pastor fido	Giacomo Rossi, after Giovanni Battista Guarini; 8b Italian libretto, 8c Italian libretto	22 November 1712	London, Queen's Theatre	20 June 1948, Handel Festival Göttingen (third, November 1734 version); 14 September 1971, Abingdon, (first, 1712 version)	HWV 8c designates the version of May 1734 and its November revival. The prologue Terpsicore added to the November 1734 revival is 8b.
9	Teseo	Nicola Francesco Haym, after Philippe Quinault's libretto for Thésée; Italian libretto	10 January 1713	London, Queen's Theatre	29 June 1947, Handel Festival Göttingen	5 acts
10	Silla	Giacomo Rossi, after Plutarch's Life of Sulla; Italian libretto	2 June 1713?	London, Queen's Theatre? (or Burlington House?)		Much of the music was re-used in Amadigi
11	Amadigi di Gaula	Rossi or Haym (?), after Antoine Houdar de la Motte's Amadis de Grèce, 1699; Italian libretto	25 May 1715	London, King's Theatre	Osnabrück, 1929	Various additions during the initial run and the revivals of 1716 and 1717
12a/b	Radamisto	Haym (?), after Domenico Lalli's L'amor tirannico, o Zenobia; Italian libretto	27 April 1720	London, King's Theatre	27 June 1927, Handel Festival Göttingen	Librettos of the revised versions of December 1720 and 1728 exist
13	Muzio Scevola	Paolo Antonio Rolli, after a reworking of a Nicolò Minato libretto by Silvio Stampiglia; Italian libretto	15 April 1721	London, King's Theatre	1928, Essen (Act 3 only)	only Act 3 is by Handel
14	Floridante	Rolli, after Francesco Silvani's La costanza in trionfo Italian libretto	9 December 1721	London, King's Theatre	10 May 1962, Unicorn Theatre, Abingdon	Revised versions premiered in 1722, 1727 and 1733
15	Ottone	Haym, after Stefano Benedetto Pallavicino's libretto for Antonio Lotti's opera Teofane; Italian libretto	12 January 1723	London, King's Theatre	5 July 1921, Handel Festival Göttingen	Revised versions premiered in 1726 and 1733
16	Flavio	Haym, after M. Noris's Il Flavio Cuniberto; Italian libretto	14 May 1723	London, King's Theatre	2 July 1967, Handel Festival Göttingen	The libretto of the revised version of 1732 exists
17	Giulio Cesare	Haym; Italian libretto	20 February 1724	London, King's Theatre	1922, Handel Festival Göttingen	
18	Tamerlano	Haym, after Agostin Piovene and Nicholas Pradon; Italian libretto	31 October 1724	London, King's Theatre	7 September 1924, Karlsruhe	
19	Rodelinda	Haym, after Antonio Salvi, after Pierre Corneille's play Pertharite, roi des Lombards; Italian libretto	13 February 1725	London, King's Theatre	26 June 1920, Handel Festival Göttingen	
20	Scipione	Rolli; Italian libretto	12 March 1726	London, King's Theatre	1937, Handel Festival Göttingen	
21	Alessandro	Rolli, after Ortensio Mauro; Italian libretto	5 May 1726	London, King's Theatre	1959, Stuttgart (in German)	
22	Admeto	Haym; Italian libretto	31 January 1727	London, King's Theatre	1964, Abingdon	
23	Riccardo Primo	Rolli, after Francesco Briani; Italian libretto	11 November 1727	London, King's Theatre	8 July 1964, Sadler's Wells Theatre (Handel Opera Society), London	
24	Siroe	Haym, after Metastasio; Italian libretto	17 February 1728	London, King's Theatre	December 1925, Gera	
25	Tolomeo	Haym, adapted from Carlo Sigismondo Capece; Italian libretto	30 April 1728	London, King's Theatre	19 June 1938, Handel Festival Göttingen	
26	Lotario	After Antonio Salvi; Italian libretto	2 December 1729	London, King's Theatre	3 September 1975, Kenton Theatre, Henley-on-Thames	
27	Partenope	After Silvio Stampiglia; Italian libretto	24 February 1730	London, King's Theatre	23 June 1935, Handel Festival Göttingen	
28	Poro	After Metastasio; Italian libretto	2 February 1731	London, King's Theatre	1928, Braunschweig	
29	Ezio	Metastasio; Italian libretto	15 January 1732	London, King's Theatre	30 June 1926, Handel Festival Göttingen	
30	Sosarme	After Salvi; Italian libretto	15 February 1732	London, King's Theatre	1970, Abingdon	First draft, Fernando, Re Di Castiglia, revived in 2007 by Il Complesso Barocco
31	Orlando	After Capece, after Ludovico Ariosto's Orlando furioso Italian libretto	27 January 1733	London, King's Theatre	6 May 1959, Abingdon	
32	Arianna in Creta	After Pietro Pariati's Arianna e Teseo	26 January 1734	London, King's Theatre		
A 11	Oreste	After Giangualberto Barlocci	18 December 1734	London, Covent Garden Theatre	1990, Karlsruhe	Pasticcio
33	Ariodante	After Salvi, after Ariosto's Orlando Furioso; Italian libretto	8 January 1735	London, Covent Garden Theatre		
34	Alcina	After Ariosto's Orlando Furioso; Italian libretto	16 April 1735	London, Covent Garden Theatre	1928, Leipzig	
35	Atalanta	After Belisario Valeriani; Italian libretto	12 May 1736	London, Covent Garden Theatre	1970, Hintlesham Festival, Hintlesham	
36	Arminio	After Salvi; Italian libretto	12 January 1737	London, Covent Garden Theatre	23 February 1935, Leipzig (in German)	
37	Giustino	Adapted from Pariati's Giustino, after Nicolo Beregan's Il Giustino; Italian libretto	16 February 1737	London, Covent Garden Theatre	21 April 1963, Abingdon	
38	Berenice	After Salvi	18 May 1737	London, Covent Garden Theatre		
39	Faramondo	Adapted from Apostolo Zeno's Faramondo; Italian libretto	3 January 1738	London, King's Theatre	5 March 1976, Handel Festival, Halle	
A 13	Alessandro Severo	After Apostolo Zeno	25 February 1738	London, King's Theatre	18 March 1997, Britten Theatre, Royal College of Music, London	Pasticcio
40	Serse	After Stampiglia; Italian libretto	15 April 1738	London, King's Theatre	5 July 1924, Handel Festival Göttingen	Also known as Xerxes
A 14	Giove in Argo	Antonio Maria Lucchini	1 May 1739	London, King's Theatre	15 September 2006, Markgräfliches Opernhaus, Bayreuth	Pasticcio
41	Imeneo	After Stampiglia's Imeneo	22 November 1740	London, theatre in Lincoln's Inn Fields	13 March 1960, Handel Festival, Halle	
42	Deidamia	Rolli; Italian libretto	10 January 1741	London, theatre in Lincoln's Inn Fields		

== See also ==
- Handel House Museum at 25 Brook Street and BBC Radio 3 worked in partnership to celebrate Handel's life and music in 2009, with BBC Radio 3 broadcasting the complete 42 operas, 8 January – 25 July 2009
- Handel's lost Hamburg operas
- List of compositions by George Frideric Handel
- Handel Reference Database
