= Handel's lost Hamburg operas =

Operas of 1703–1706 that have been lost

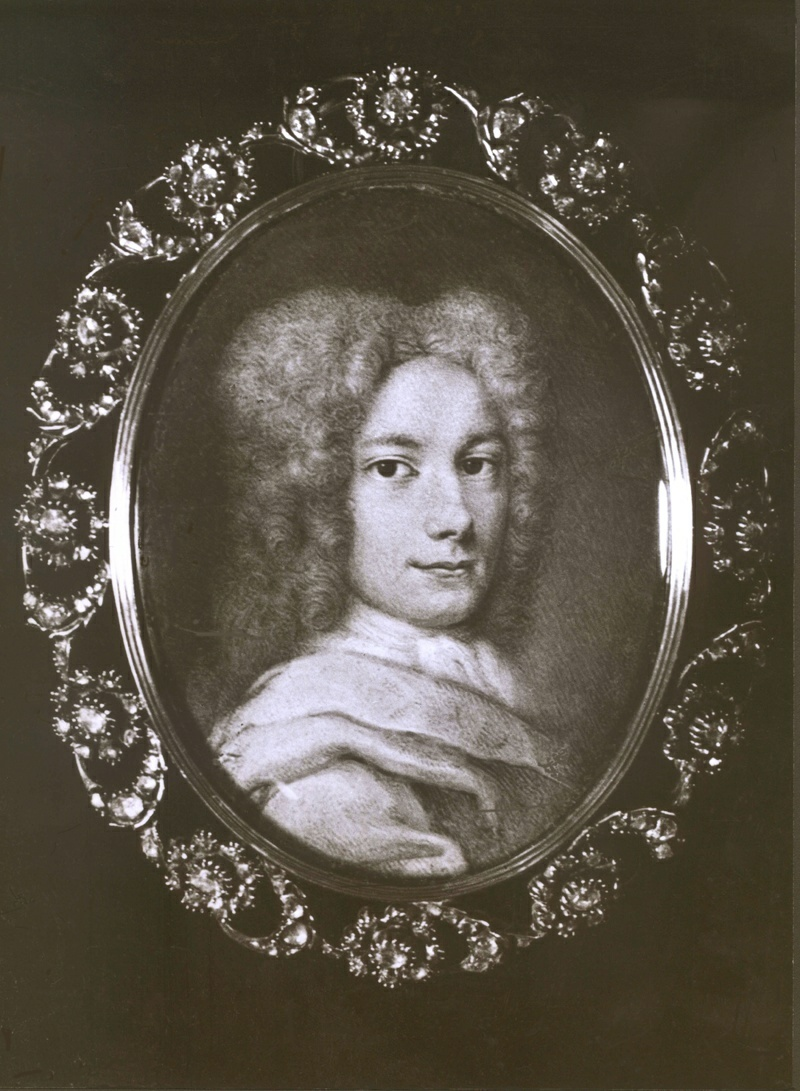
Handel c. 1710

In 1703, the 18-year-old composer George Frideric Handel took up residence in Hamburg, Germany, where he remained until 1706. During this period he composed four operas, only the first of which, Almira, has survived more or less intact. Of the other three, the music for Nero is lost, while only short orchestral excerpts from Florindo and Daphne survive.

Handel was born and grew up in Halle an der Saale, where he received his early musical education and became an accomplished organist. In Hamburg he obtained employment as a violinist at the Oper am Gänsemarkt, the city's famous opera house. Here, he learned the rudiments of opera composition, mainly under the influences of Reinhard Keiser, the theatre's music director, and Johann Mattheson, its leading vocalist. The Gänsemarkt was largely dedicated to Keiser's compositions; his temporary absence in 1704 gave Handel his chance, and in quick succession he wrote Almira and Nero using librettos by Friedrich Christian Feustking. Almira was successful, Nero less so and was never performed after its initial run of three performances. Handel's final Hamburg operas, Florindo and Daphne, based on librettos by Heinrich Hinsch and originally conceived as a giant single entity, were not produced at the Gänsemarkt before Handel left Hamburg for Italy in 1706.

No music that can be definitively traced to Nero has been identified, although Handel scholars have speculated that some of it may have been used in later works, particularly Agrippina which has a related storyline and some of the same characters. Fragments of music from Florindo and Daphne have been preserved, although without the vocal parts, and some of these elements have been incorporated into an orchestral suite first recorded in December 1997.

== Background ==
=== Halle ===
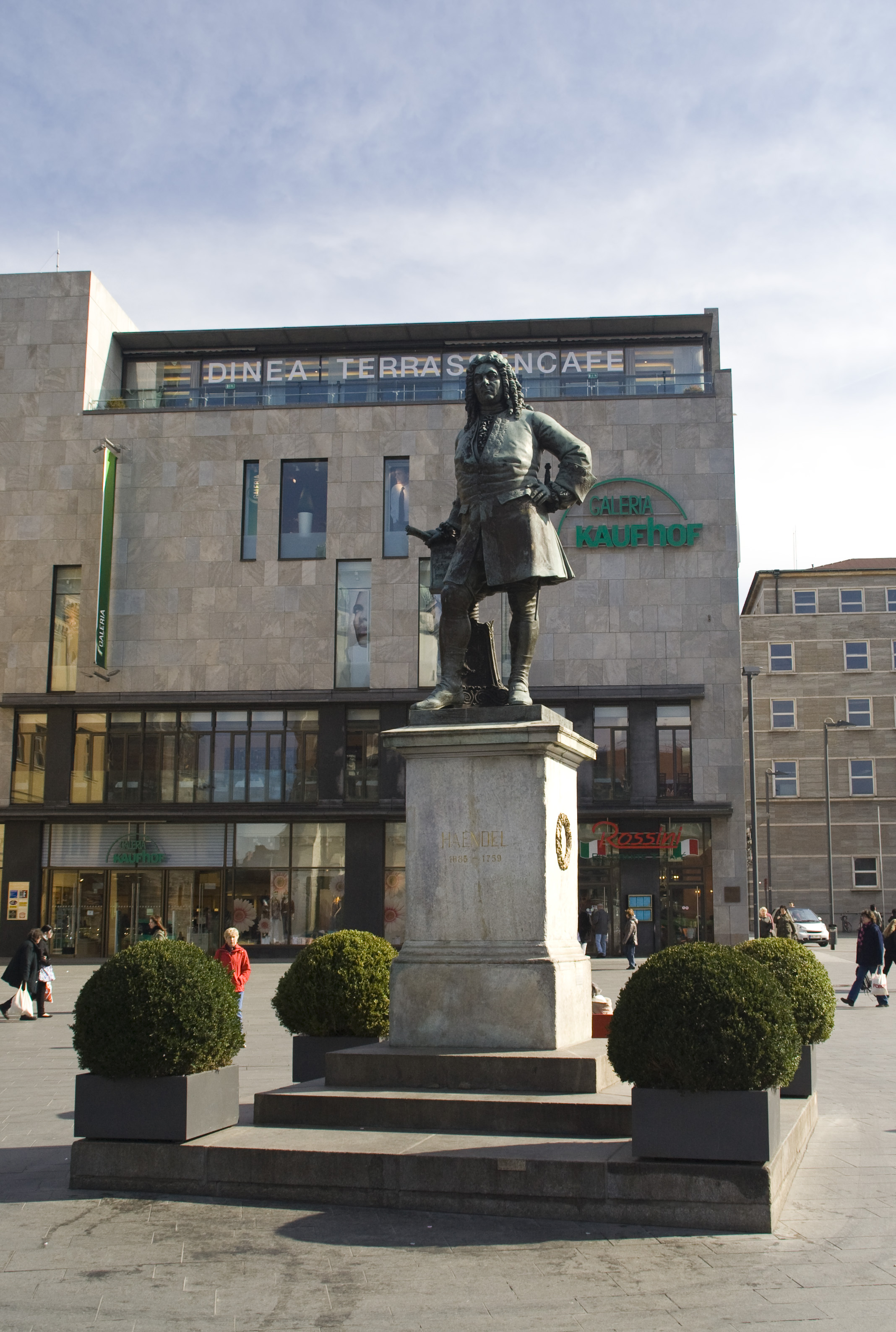
The statue of Handel, in Halle

Handel was born Georg Friedrich Händel on 23 February 1685 in the German city of Halle. (Note: Handel was baptised as "Georg Friedrich Händel", but dropped the umlaut and anglicised the spelling of his forenames when he moved permanently to England in 1712.) It is unclear what initial musical education he received; his father, Georg Händel, was not a music lover, and did not at first appreciate or encourage his son's precocious talents. Nevertheless, by the age of ten Handel had become an accomplished organist; his playing in the royal chapel at Weißenfels, where his half-brother Karl was in the service of the Duke of Saxe-Weißenfels, impressed the duke, who persuaded Händel senior that the boy should have a proper musical education. As a result, Handel began formal study under Friedrich Zachow, the organist of the Lutheran church at Halle.

Handel's biographer Jonathan Keates writes that: "From [Zachow] Handel learned not only a great deal about the line and shape of an aria, about strong, adventurous bass lines and solid choral writing, but also about those delicacies of instrumental colouring which he later perfected in his own style". Handel's musical development also benefited from an early and lasting friendship with Georg Philipp Telemann, whom he met in 1700. In February 1702 Handel enrolled at the University of Halle, perhaps intending to study law. In March he took up the post of organist at Halle's Calvinist cathedral (Domkirche), a prestigious appointment for one so young and indicative of his burgeoning musical reputation in the city.

At some time, possibly in late 1702 or early 1703, Handel visited Berlin, where his father had held an honorary post as physician to the elector who, in 1701, had become the Prussian king Frederick I. In Berlin Handel first experienced Italian opera, and may have met the Italian composers Giovanni Bononcini and Attilio Ariosti, who were writing operas for Frederick's court. The king heard of Handel's abilities, and wanted him to train as a future court composer, but Handel's horizons had been broadened by his sojourn in Berlin and he was developing his own ideas for his future. He declined the king's offer, and returned to Halle to fulfil his year's contract at the Domkirche. (Note: The precise date of the Berlin visit is uncertain. Handel's contemporary and first biographer John Mainwaring, writing in 1760, dates it to 1697, when Georg Händel was still alive, but this early date is problematic, since Bononcini was not resident in Berlin before 1702. It is possible that Mainwaring conflated two separate visits.) With few career prospects available in his home city, Handel would have liked to go to Italy, but this, he realised, was not yet practicable, since he lacked both cash and contacts. Instead in mid-1703 he left Halle for Hamburg, a thriving free city which housed the leading opera house in northern Germany.

=== Hamburg ===
==== The Oper am Gänsemarkt ====
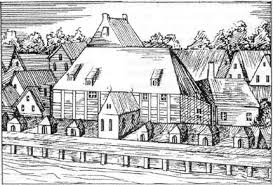
Early 18th-century engraving of the Hamburg Oper am Gänsemarkt, where Handel's early operas were performed

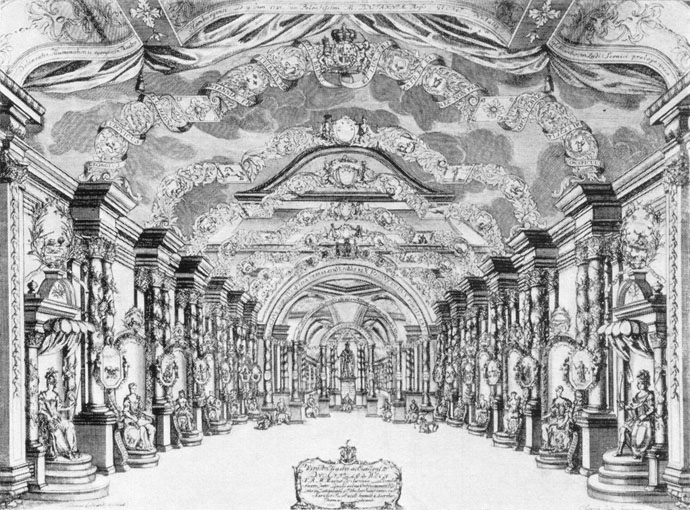
Print of decorations in the opera house during a festival in honour of George I

The Hamburg Opera, known as the Oper am Gänsemarkt, was the first public opera house to be established outside Italy. The brainchild of the exiled Duke of Schleswig-Gottorf and his Kapellmeister, Johann Theile, it was designed by Girolamo Sartorio, and modelled on the Teatro Santi Giovanni e Paolo in Venice. Its construction was opposed by the clergy and cathedral hierarchy, but enthusiastically supported by the city's municipal authorities. Built in 1677 on a lavish scale, with a reported capacity of 2,000, it boasted an exceptionally deep stage and was, according to Handel scholars Winton Dean and John Merrill Knapp, one of the best-equipped theatres of its time.

Dean and Knapp write that the theatre's history was "enlivened and envenomed by a maelstrom of controversy, pursued in pamphlets, broadsheets, sermons and prefaces to librettos ... and by financial crises which persisted on and off throughout the sixty years of its existence". A preponderance of biblically inspired works in the earliest years was soon replaced by a range of more secular subjects, often drawn from Roman history and myth, or from recent events such as the 1683 siege of Vienna. Performances tended to be of considerable length, often extending to six hours. The 18-year-old Handel entered this hectic environment in mid-1703, to take up a place in the theatre's orchestra as a ripieno (ensemble) second violin.

==== Keiser and Mattheson ====
Handel joined the Hamburg opera company when it was experiencing a period of considerable artistic success. This blossoming followed the arrival of Reinhard Keiser, who had become musical director at the Gänsemarkt in about 1697, and in 1703 succeeded Johann Sigismund Kusser as the theatre's manager. Born in 1674, Keiser had studied under Johann Schelle and probably Johann Kuhnau at the St. Thomas School, Leipzig. In 1694 he was employed as a court composer at Brunswick, where in three years he composed seven operas, at least one of which (Mahumeth) was performed in Hamburg. According to Handel's biographer Donald Burrows, Keiser was a good judge of popular taste, with a flair for writing Italian-style arias. Between 1697 and 1703, prior to Handel's arrival, about a dozen more Keiser operas had been staged at the Gänsemarkt. Despite his on-stage successes, Keiser was an unreliable general manager, with expensive private tastes and little financial acumen, often at odds with his creditors.

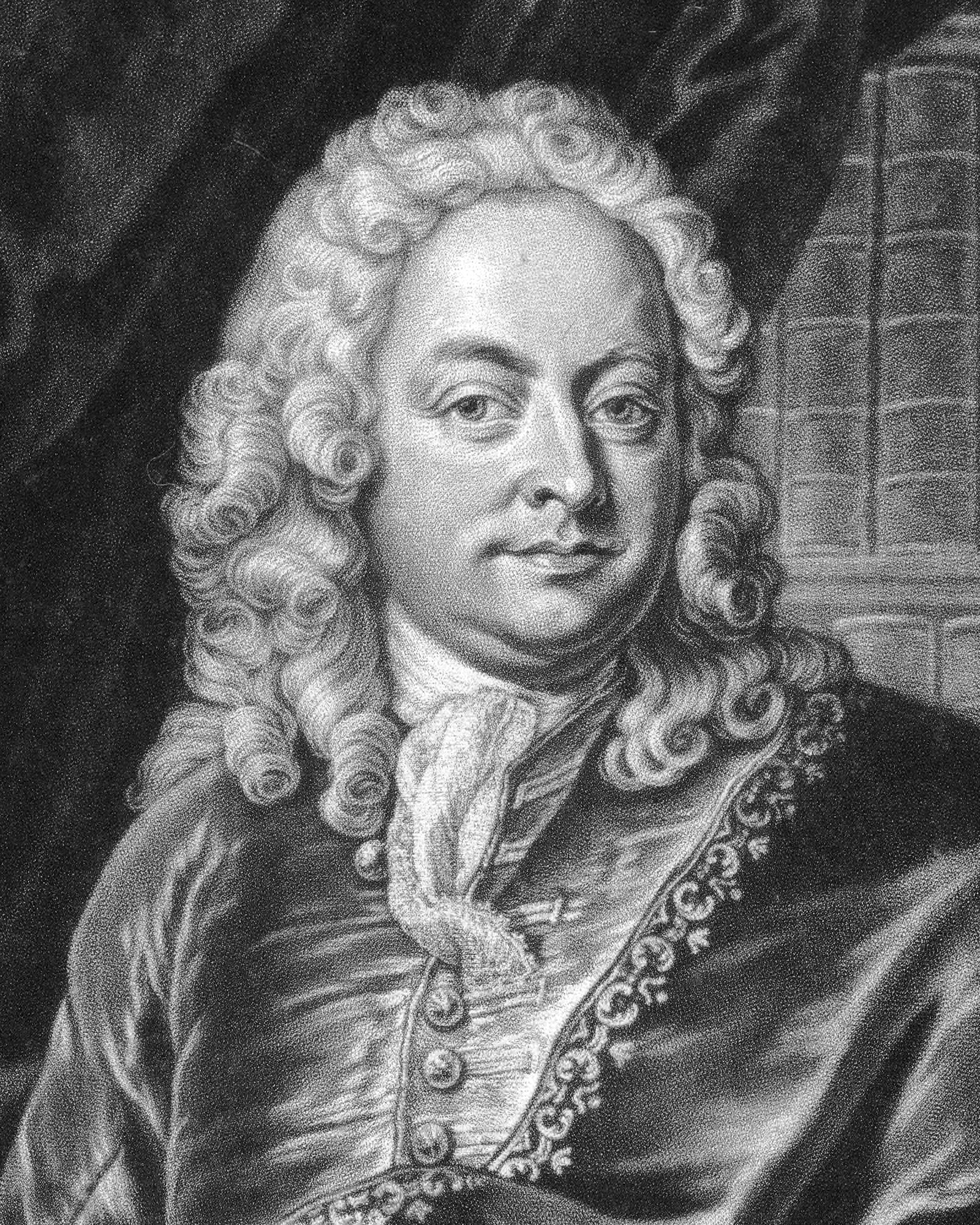
Johann Mattheson, one of Handel's Hamburg mentors

It is possible that Keiser, who had connections in the Halle area, had heard of Handel and was directly instrumental in securing the latter's post in the Gänsemarkt orchestra; certainly he was a considerable influence on the younger man in the three years that Handel spent in Hamburg. Another important Gänsemarkt colleague was the house composer and singer Johann Mattheson, who noted Handel's rapid progress in the orchestra from back-desk violinist to harpsichord soloist, a role in which, said Mattheson, "he showed himself a man—a thing which no one had before suspected, save I alone". Mattheson was less complimentary on Handel's early efforts at composition: "He composed very long, long arias, and really interminable cantatas", before, it seems, "the lofty schooling of opera ... trimmed him into other fashions".

==== Almira ====
In 1704, Keiser, seeking refuge from his creditors, temporarily left Hamburg for Weißenfels in Saxony, near to his hometown Teuchern. He took with him his donkey and his most recent opera composition, Almira, a setting of a libretto by Friedrich Christian Feustking, thus denying this work to the Gänsemarkt—Keiser produced it in Weißenfels in July 1704. In these circumstances the temporary management turned to the 19-year-old Handel and requested a fresh setting of Feustking's libretto. Handel complied; his version was premiered at the Gänsemarkt on 8 January 1705, and ran for 20 performances—a marked success.

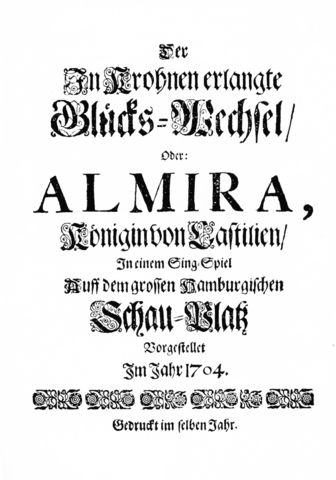
Title page of the libretto of Almira

The fictional plot appears to have originated from Giuseppe Boniventi's opera, L'Almira, with a libretto by Giulio Pancieri, performed in Venice in 1691. The relatively light-hearted story, typical of 17th-century dramatic conventions, is told in three acts and records the machinations surrounding the newly crowned queen Almira's secret love for her secretary, Fernando, in opposition to her dead father's dying wish that she marry someone from the family of her guardian Consalvo. Keates writes of the work: "The whole thing belongs very much to its Venetian baroque world ... full of intrigue interlaced with comedy and ballet." These features, even the mixture of languages between Italian and German, often recur in Handel's later work. The music, which has been preserved largely through a conducting score prepared by Telemann, reflects Handel's debt to Keiser and displays a variety of traditions: a French-style overture, German-influenced orchestration, and Italianate vocal writing. Dean and Knapp summarise the score as "very uneven in style, quality and technique, with abundant promise but intermittent fulfilment".

== Lost works ==
=== Nero ===
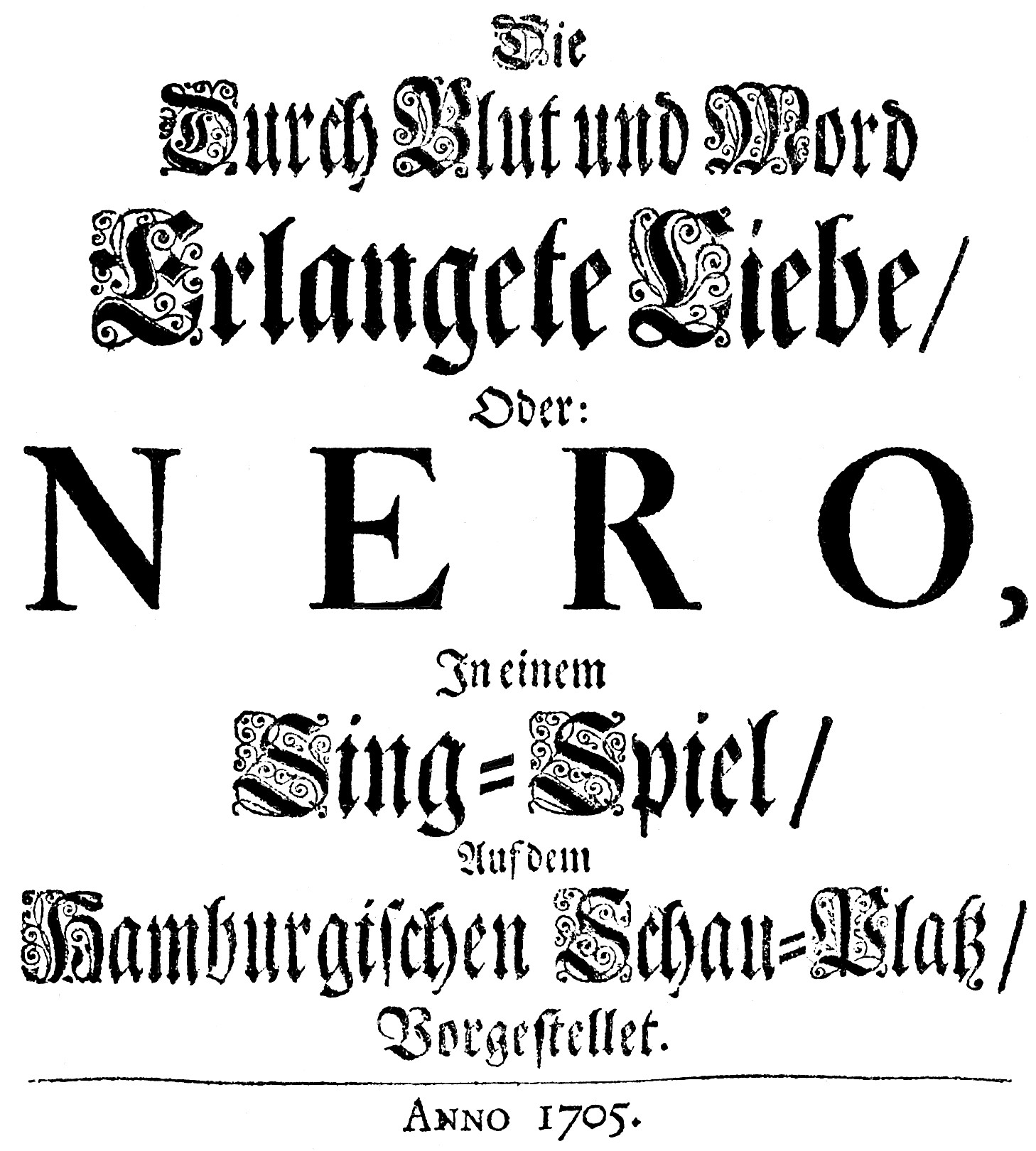
Title page of the libretto

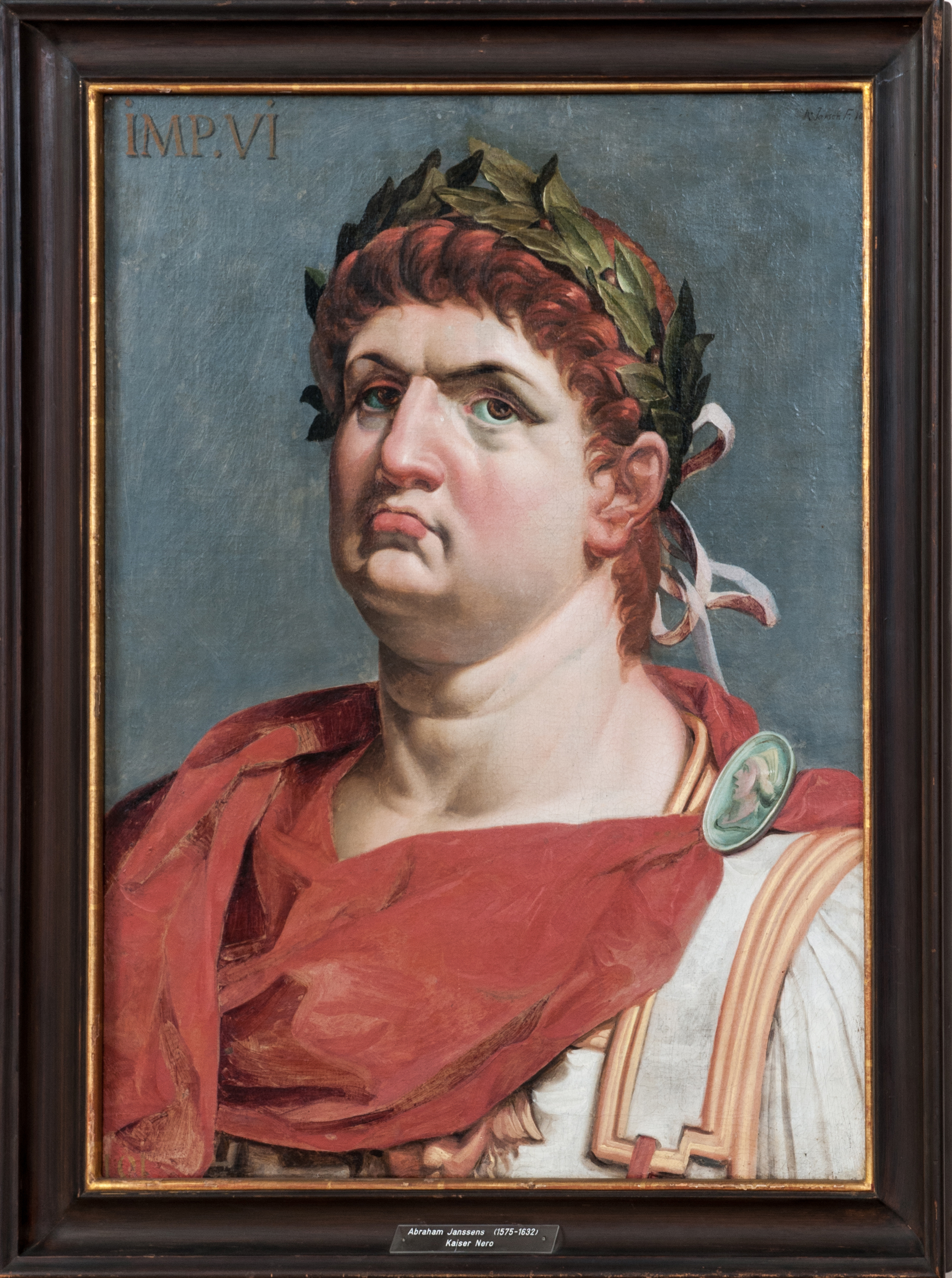
Portrait of Nero (17th century)

==== General ====
The success of Almira prompted the Gänsemarkt management to follow it almost immediately with a second Handel setting, Die durch Blut und Mord erlangete Lieb; oder, Nero ("The love obtained through blood and murder; or, Nero") generally known as Nero, again based on a Feustking libretto. The libretto survives intact, but the music is entirely lost. Dean and Knapp record that a copy of Handel's manuscript score was held in the library of the Hamburg impresario J.C. Westphal until 1830, when it was sold and thereafter disappeared. The whole work incorporates 20 ensembles and 57 arias.

==== Libretto ====
Feustking's libretto was written entirely in German, its probable sources being the ancient histories of Tacitus and Suetonius. The text has been widely criticised for its low quality; Friedrich Chrysander wrote of it: "There is no spirit in the verse, and one feels vexation in setting such stuff to music". A later critic, Paul Henry Lang, cites the "miserable quality" of the libretto as the principal reason for the opera's failure. Dean and Knapp suggest that the main fault is that Feustking fatally over-complicates the main story by incorporating sub-plots, unnecessary extra characters, and "every stock device known to the operatic repertory". These intrusions include disguises, mistaken identities, a much-ridiculed philosopher, a comic servant and a play within the play. Many of the characters are historical, including Nero, Octavia, Poppea, Nero's mother Agrippina, and Seneca the philosopher. Several of these appear in Handel's later (1709) opera Agrippina. Another real-life figure who appears in Nero is Anicetus, who historically is held to have murdered Agrippina on Nero's behalf. Described in the libretto as des Kaysers Mignon oder Liebling ("The emperor's little one, or darling"), Anicetus is Handel's only openly gay operatic character.

==== Characters ====
As listed and described in Burrows et al.: George Frideric Handel: Volume 1, 1609–1725: Collected Documents (2011).

- Nero, Roman emperor
- Agrippina, the emperor's mother
- Octavia, the emperor's wife, subsequently repudiated
- Sabina Poppea, a Roman noblewoman, Nero's mistress
- Tiridates, Armenian crown prince
- Cassandra, crown princess of Media, in love with Tiridates
- Seneca, Imperial privy counsellor
- Anicetus, Nero's "mignon" or favourite
- Graptus, the late emperor Claudius's freedman
- A flamen or priest
- Choruses of priests, Roman people
- Dances of combatants, arsonists, Harlequins and Punchinellos, knights and ladies

==== Plot ====
The main story, told over three acts, follows generally that of Busenello's libretto for Monteverdi's 1642 opera L'incoronazione di Poppea. It recounts Nero's various schemes to replace his current queen Octavia with his mistress Poppea, against the urgings of his mother Agrippina and the philosopher Seneca. A sub-plot introduces Tiridates, crown prince of Armenia, another historical figure who, in the opera, is betrothed to the fictional Cassandra but is secretly pursuing Poppea in rivalry with the emperor. Octavia and Cassandra provide each other with mutual support in their trials, while Agrippina allies with Octavia and narrowly escapes death from a piece of falling masonry. In turn, she tries unsuccessfully to persuade Seneca to kill Nero. As a stratagem to secure Tiridates's love, Cassandra disguises herself and informs him of her death, which news temporarily deranges him. Anicetus further complicates matters by falling in love with Octavia. As these events develop, the servant Graptus provides a mocking, ironic commentary. Nero's play, "The Judgement of Paris", and a representation of the burning of Rome occupy much of Act III. After these many digressions the opera concludes with the banishment of Octavia, the incarceration of Agrippina, the return of his senses to Tiridates when he learns that Cassandra is alive, and a joyful and triumphant double coronation: Nero and Poppea, and Tiridates and Cassandra.

==== Performance history ====
Nero opened on 25 February 1705, with Mattheson in the title role. Its staging so closely after Almira's run indicates that it was probably composed, in part or in whole, during 1704. There are no surviving accounts of its public reception, but it clearly proved less successful than its predecessor, running for just three performances before the theatre closed for the Lenten season. When the Gänsemarkt reopened the opera was not revived, and was never performed again.

==== Music ====
Although there is no extant music that can be positively identified with Nero, there is a possibility that some of it may have been used in later works. John E. Sawyer, in his analysis of Agrippina, reveals that this work, composed five years after Nero with similar characters, "contains the highest proportion of borrowed material of any of the composer's major dramatic works", and Dean and Knapp speculate as to whether it also incorporates borrowings from Nero. According to the Handel scholar Charles Cudworth, the suite of dances that follows the overture to Handel's 1707 opera Rodrigo (his first after leaving Hamburg), could very well have begun as ballet music in Nero or another of the lost Hamburg operas. The musicologist Bernd Baselt has raised the possibility that Handel's Harpsichord Suite in G Minor, HWV 453, is an arrangement of the overture to Nero. A version of this suite, reconstructed for orchestra by Peter Holman, is included in a selection of Handel's Hamburg music, issued by Hyperion Records in October 1998 (cat.no. CDA67053, reissued in January 2012 as CDH55324).

=== Florindo and Daphne ===
==== General ====
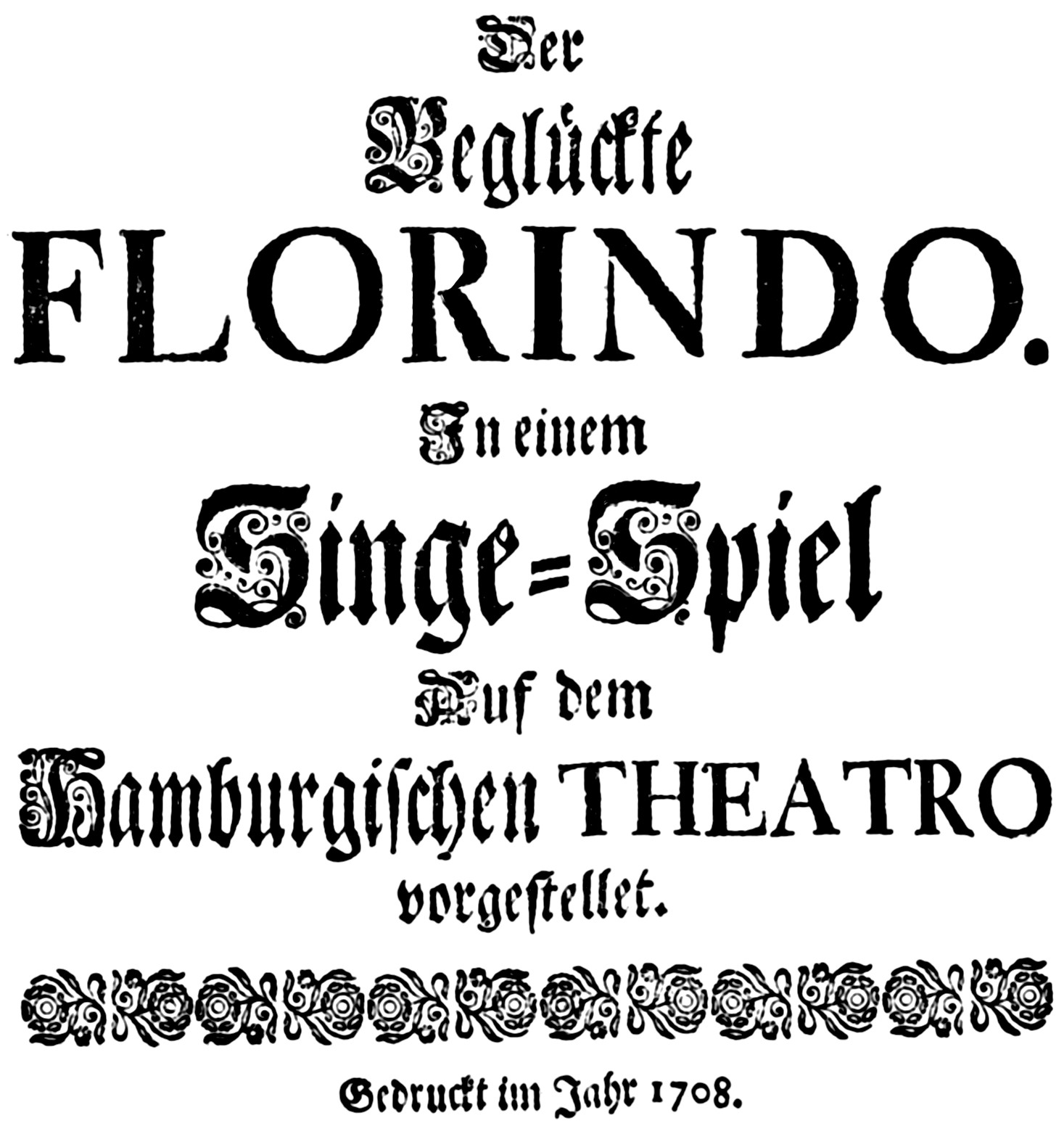
Title page of the libretto

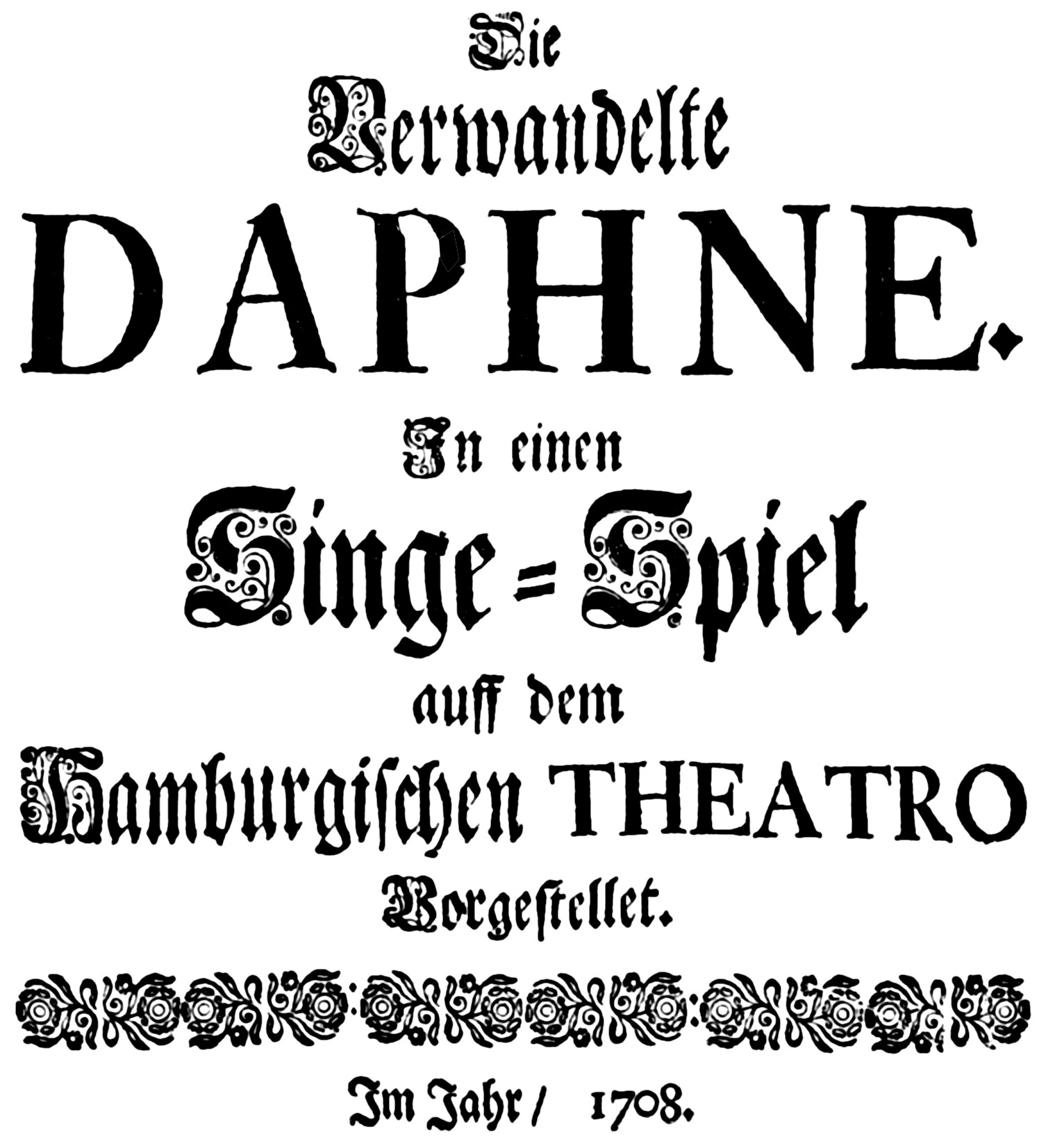
Title page of the libretto

Following its closure at the start of the 1705 Lenten season, the Gänsemarkt did not reopen until August, by which time Keiser had returned from Weißenfels to produce his opera Octavia. From this point, Handel's regular connection with the theatre appears to have diminished. Although he remained in Hamburg for a further year, his main source of income was from private lessons, as he saved for his long-desired visit to Italy. He nevertheless accepted a commission from the Gänsemarkt to compose a setting for a large-scale opera based on the Greek myth of Apollo and Daphne. With its rambling plot and an assortment of dances and other set pieces—almost 100 musical numbers in all—the work was eventually divided into two separate operas, for performance on successive nights. The two sections were given the formal names Der beglückte Florindo (The delighted Florindo) and Die verwandelte Daphne ("Daphne metamorphosed"), but are generally known as Florindo and Daphne. It is not known when Handel wrote the music. He may have completed it in 1705–06 while still in Hamburg, or it may have been composed in Italy after arriving there in the latter part of 1706.

==== Libretto ====
The text is by Heinrich (sometimes rendered as "Hinrich") Hinsch, an established Gänsemarkt librettist whose stated intention was adapting stories to provide "a pleasurable poetic experience", to "[titillate] the senses of its audience without attempting to address their reason or understanding". In this case he took as his base material the episode of Phoebus (Apollo) and Daphne as told in Book 1 of Ovid's Metamorphoses, but added a plethora of new characters and incidents which move the story significantly away from the Ovidian original. The main language is German, but the presence of several ensembles and arias in Italian leads Dean and Knapp to speculate that Hinsch may have used an Italian libretto as his source. The Florindo and Daphne libretti were published in the Händel-Jahrbuch, in 1984 and 1985 respectively, and in facsimile form in 1989 as part of a 13-volume edited by Ellen T. Harris.

The preface to the Florindo libretto explains Hinsch's choice of titles: "The first of [the two parts] presents the Pythean festival, instituted in honour of Phoebus (Apollo), and the betrothal of Florinda and Daphne which took place on the same day, so it receives the title 'Florindo made happy'. The other part represents Daphne's stubborn resistance to Phoebus's love, also the abhorrence she feels for all love, and finally her metamorphosis into a laurel tree, from which it receives the title 'Daphne metamorphosed' ".

==== Characters ====
As listed and described in Burrows et al.: George Frideric Handel: Volume 1, 1609–1725: Collected Documents (2011).

- Phoebus (Apollo), in love with Daphne
- Daphne, daughter of the river-god Peneus. Loved by Phoebus, betrothed to Florindo
- Florindo, son of the river-god Enipheus. Betrothed to Daphne, secretly loved by Alsirena
- Lycoris, a Thessalian nymph, in love with Florindo
- Damon, a Thessalian shepherd in love with Lycoris
- Galathea, an aged nymph, Daphne's confidante
- Alsirena, daughter of the river-god Apidinus, secretly in love with Florindo
- Thyrsis, a noble Arcadian shepherd, Damon's friend
- Cupid, Vulcan, Peneus, Enipheus: gods
- Chorus: Thessalian shepherds/shepherdesses, Cyclops, Tritons, Naiads

==== Plot ====
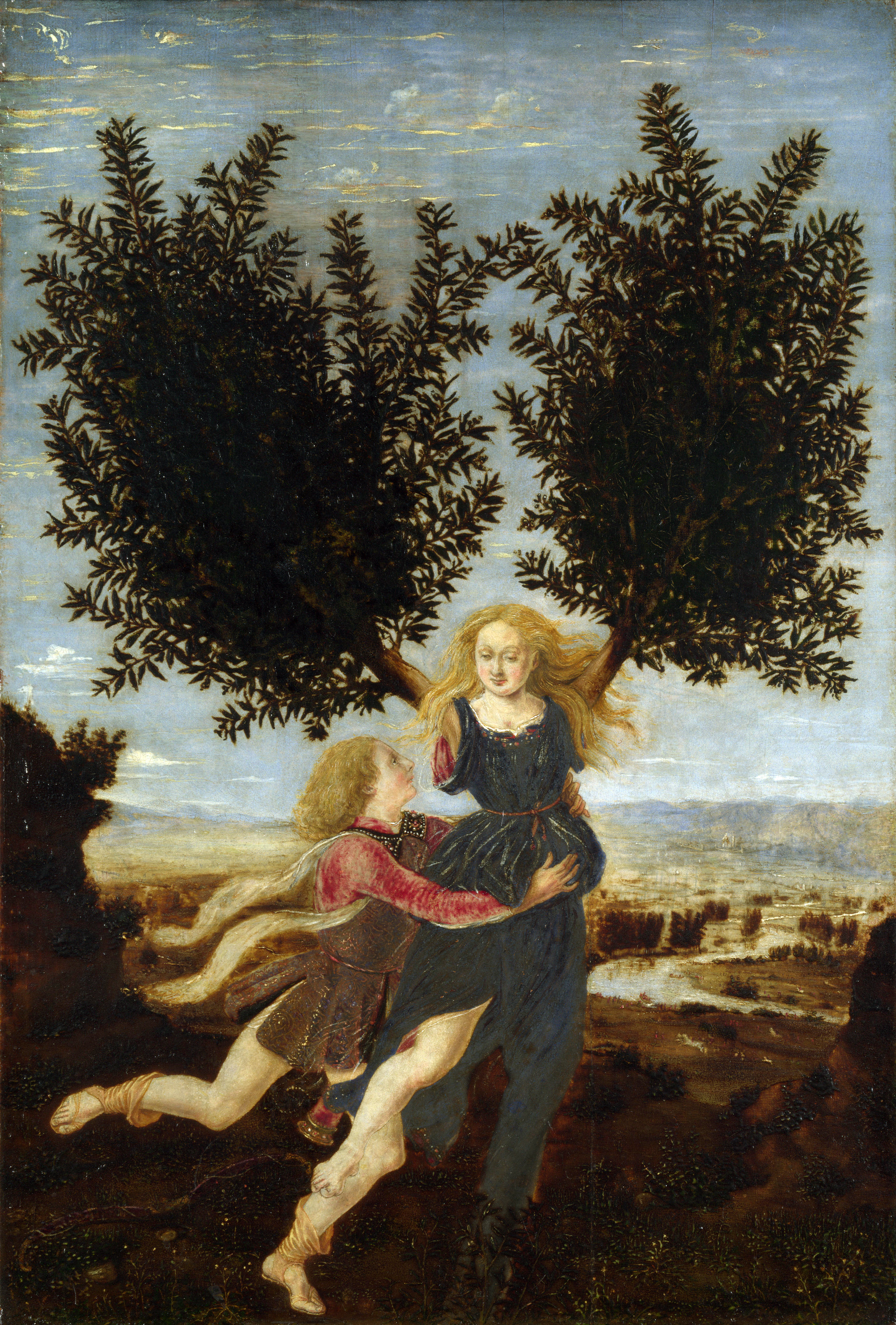
The Greek myth of Apollo and Daphne, as told by the Roman poet Ovid, forms the basis of the double-opera

Florindo opens with celebrations to mark Apollo's victory over the dragon Python. Apollo boasts that he is more proficient with the bow than Cupid. This offends the latter, who mischievously wounds Apollo with a drugged arrow which causes him to fall in love with Daphne. She, however, has pledged her love for Florindo, who is at the centre of a complex tangle of infatuations: he is secretly loved by Alfirena and more openly by the scheming shepherdess Lycoris, who in turn is the object of the shepherd Damon's desires. The various would-be lovers are consoled or advised by Damon's friend Thyrsis, and by the ageing nymph Galathea, who has herself not quite given up on love, though her advances to Thyrsis are rejected. Daphne and Florindo prepare to marry, but Apollo remains hopeful and continues his suit. Lycoris is prepared to await the outcome of events, but Damon, Galathea and Alfirena are in despair, as the opera ends with another spectacular celebration in honour of Apollo.

The second opera, Daphne, begins as the wedding of Florindo and Daphne gets under way. Cupid, bent on more mischief, wounds Daphne with a special arrow, forged by the god Vulcan, that causes her to renounce all love. She abandons the wedding and announces that she will join the goddess Diana and become a huntress. This sparks a series of schemes and counter-schemes as both Apollo and Florindo continue to pursue Daphne while the other would-be lovers manoeuvre for position. Lycoris assures Apollo that Daphne's abandonment of the wedding was a signal that she favours him. Lycoris also steals Daphne's cloak and, wearing it as a disguise, makes advances to Damon, having first ensured that Florindo overhears. Florindo is enraged by what he believes is Daphne's duplicity, and denounces her. Damon confirms the story. Daphne, bewildered, pleads with her father Peneus to prove her innocence; he responds by transforming her into a laurel tree. Cupid blames Apollo's pride for the fiasco, but gives him the laurel as his "special tree". Florindo now accepts Alfirena, and Lycoris, having confessed her scheming, is united with Damon. Only the guiltless Daphne ends up losing everything.

==== Performance history ====
Dean and Knapp record that in early 1707 Keiser surrendered the lease of the Gänsemarkt to Johann Heinrich Sauerbrey, who thus became responsible for the staging of the double opera. It may by this time have been in rehearsal, and the difficulties involved in such a complex and elaborate work may have necessitated several postponements. The consensus among experts is that the two parts were first performed on consecutive evenings in January 1708, as they are the first works in Mattheson's opera list for 1708. There are no surviving records of the public's reception, the length of the original run, or of any revivals. Whether Handel was present at any time during rehearsals or performance is uncertain; he may have returned from Italy, fresh from the opening of Rodrigo in Florence, to supervise the production of Florindo and Daphne in Hamburg. Dean and Knapp suggest the works may have been directed from the harpsichord by Christoph Graupner, (Note: Graupner, a graduate of the Thomasschule, joined the Gänsemarkt in 1706, and until 1709 was among the theatre's principal opera composers; five of his works were staged in that period, and he may have collaborated with Keiser on others.) although Anthony Hicks in his Grove Handel biography, says that so unusual a project would not have been attempted without the composer's presence.

The theatre's management was clearly concerned that the public might find the double opera too heavy in undiluted form. Accordingly, a comic intermezzo in Low German dialect (platte-deutsch) was devised by Sauerbrey to precede the performance of Daphne. The critic and essayist Romain Rolland, in his life of Handel, termed this a "mutilation", carried out "for fear that the music may tire the hearers".

==== Music ====
A few fragments of music from the twin operas survive. The Newman Flower collection at Manchester Central Library holds three arias and a chorus, in full orchestral score but with the vocal parts missing. A blank stave with a soprano clef suggests that the three arias were written for soprano voice. The chorus has been identified by Baselt with "Streue, o Bräutigam", from Act 1 of Daphne. Two of the arias are tentatively associated with "Mie speranza, andate" from Act 1 of Florindo, and "Mostrati più crudele" from the third act of Daphne. The third aria has not been identified.

The Royal Music Collection at the British Library houses the manuscripts of instrumental pieces, mainly dances, that belong to Florindo and Daphne. A group of eight short pieces (Note: These are listed by Dean and Knapp as: "Coro" in B-flat; Untitled in B flat; "Allemande" in G minor; "Rigadon" in D minor; "Allemande" in G major; "Bourrée" in G minor; Untitled in G minor, and a second "Allemande" in G major.) have been catalogued as two four-movement suites, HWV352 and HWV353. The British Library collection includes a further group of four movements, scored for string orchestra, which has been catalogued as HWV354.

As with Nero, it is possible that music from Florindo or Daphne was recycled by Handel for use in later works. The overture to the opera Rodrigo consists of eight French-style dances, which Cudworth believes might have begun life as ballet music in one or other of the lost Hamburg operas. In 1709–10 Handel composed the cantata Apollo e Dafne, which has common ground with the earlier operas. Harris makes the point that when writing the cantata, Handel would have recalled his earlier setting, and perhaps borrowed from it. Dean and Knapp provide further example of works in which the Florinda and Daphne music may have re-emerged: the oratorio Il trionfo del Tempo e del Disinganno (1707); the opera Radamisto (1720); and the overture in B flat, HWV336, which Baselt conjectures might have been written as the overture to Florindo. This last-named has been combined with HWV352–354 to form the Suite from the operas Florindo and Daphne, which in 1997 was adapted and recorded by The Parley of Instruments under Peter Holman.

== Afterwards ==
Handel's Hamburg years provided him with a composing apprenticeship, particularly although not exclusively as a writer of opera. The influence of Keiser, which began during this period, was significant throughout Handel's career. Apart from his lifelong habit of "borrowing" fragments from Keiser's operas for use in his own works, he adopted and retained many of his mentor's compositional characteristics; according to Hicks, "[Handel] never relinquished French forms for overtures and dance music, and his use of orchestral colour, particularly the occasional instrumental doubling of the voice colla parte, was derived from German models".

The loss of much of Handel's early work was first noted by his earliest biographer, Mainwaring (1760), who refers to "a great quantity of music" from Hamburg and Italy, adding that it was not known how much of it still existed. On departing from Hamburg, Handel spent a further three years in Italy before settling in London, where he remained the dominant composer of Italianate opera for the following thirty years. After his Hamburg initiation, Handel composed more than forty operas, beginning with Rodrigo in 1707, and ending in 1740 with Deidamia. These works were quickly forgotten after Handel's death; modern revivals did not begin until the 1920s. Dean and Knapp believe that, despite the years of relative neglect, Handel's achievements as a composer of opera entitle him to rank alongside Monteverdi, Mozart, Verdi, and Richard Wagner as one of the supreme masters of the genre.

== Notes and references ==
=== Sources ===
- Burrows, Donald (2012). Handel. Oxford: Oxford University Press. ISBN 978-0-19-973736-9.
- Burrows, Donald; Coffey, Helen; Greenacombe, John; Hicks, Anthony (2014). George Frideric Handel: Volume 1, 1609–1725: Collected Documents. Cambridge: Cambridge University Press. ISBN 978-1-107-01953-9.
- Cudworth, Charles (2 April 1959). "Handel and the French Style". Music & Letters. 40 (2): 122–31. doi:10.1093/ml/XL.4.122. JSTOR 728982. (subscription required)
- Dean, Winton; Knapp, John Merrill (2008). Handel's Operas 1704–1726. Oxford: Oxford University Press. ISBN 978-0-19-816441-8.
- Dent, Edward J. (1934). Handel. London: Duckworth. OCLC 2413442.
- Harris, Ellen T. (2001). Handel as Orpheus: Voice and Desire in the Chamber Cantata. Cambridge, Massachusetts: Harvard University Press. ISBN 0-674-00617-8.
- Hicks, Anthony (2007). "Handel, George Frideric: Hamburg". Oxford Music Online. (subscription required)
- Hicks, Anthony (2007). "Handel, George Frideric: List of Works". Oxford Music Online. (subscription required)
- Keates, Jonathan (2009). Handel: The Man & His Music. London: The Bodley Head. ISBN 978-0-224-08202-0.
- Lang, Paul Henry (1996). George Frideric Handel. New York: Dover Publications. ISBN 0-486-29227-4.
- Manuwald, Gesine (2013). Nero in Opera: Librettos as Transformations of Ancient Sources. Berlin: Walter de Gruyter. ISBN 978-3-11-031713-8.
- McCleave, Sarah (2013). Dance in Handel's London Operas. Rochester, New York: University of Rochester Press. ISBN 978-1-58046-420-8.
- McCredie, Andrew (2007). "Graupner, Christoph". Oxford Music Online. (subscription required)
- Roberts, John H. (2007). "Keiser, Reinhard: Life". Oxford Music Online. (subscription required)
- Roberts, John H. (2007). "Keiser, Reinhard: Works". Oxford Music Online. (subscription required)
- Rolland, Romain (2013). Handel. Redditch: Read Books Ltd (ebook). ISBN 9781473377134. OCLC 300587865.
- Sawyer, John E. (November 1999). "Irony and Borrowing in Handel's Agrippina". Music & Letters. 80 (4): 531–55. doi:10.1093/ml/80.4.531. JSTOR 854988. (subscription required)
- Schröder, Dorothea (2007). "Feustking, Friedrich Christian". Oxford Music Online. (subscription required)
- "Handel in Hamburg". Hyperion Records.
- Van Til, Marian (2007). George Frideric Handel: A Music Lover's Guide. Youngstown, New York: WordPower Publishing. ISBN 978-0-9794785-0-5.
- "Youthful Exuberance: Handel's Almira". World of Opera. Archived from the original on 26 November 2015.
