= Almira =

1705 opera by George Frideric Handel

- Opera by George Frideric Handel
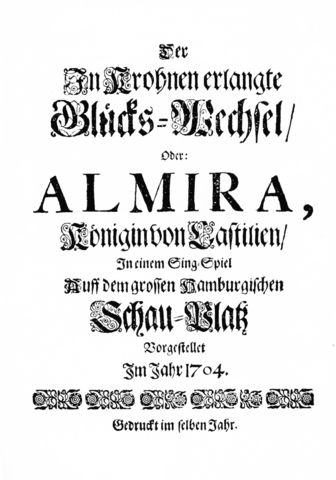
- Title page of the libretto, 1708
- Librettist: Friedrich Christian Feustking
- Language: German; Italian
- Based on: libretto by Giulio Pancheri
- Premiere: 8 January 1705; Oper am Gänsemarkt, Hamburg

Almira, Königin von Castilien ("Almira, Queen of Castile", HWV 1; full title: Der in Krohnen erlangte Glücks-Wechsel, oder: Almira, Königin von Castilien) is George Frideric Handel's first opera, composed when he was 19 years old. It was first performed in Hamburg in January 1705.

== Background ==
Georg Friedrich Händel came to the city of Hamburg in the summer of 1703 and played as a violinist in the theatre at the Gänsemarkt, the local market place. On later occasions, he also played the harpsichord in the orchestra. His first opera – announced as a Singspiel although it has no spoken dialogue – was premiered on 8 January 1705, after being composed in the months directly preceding this.

An Italian libretto was written by Giulio Pancheri in Venice in 1691 for Giuseppe Benevento's opera L'Almira. The German translation used by Handel was made by Friedrich Christian Feustking. The recitatives of the opera are in German, and while most of the arias are also in German, many are in Italian, as was the custom at the opera house in Hamburg.

Almira is the sole example among Handel's many operas with no role for a castrato.

== Performance history ==
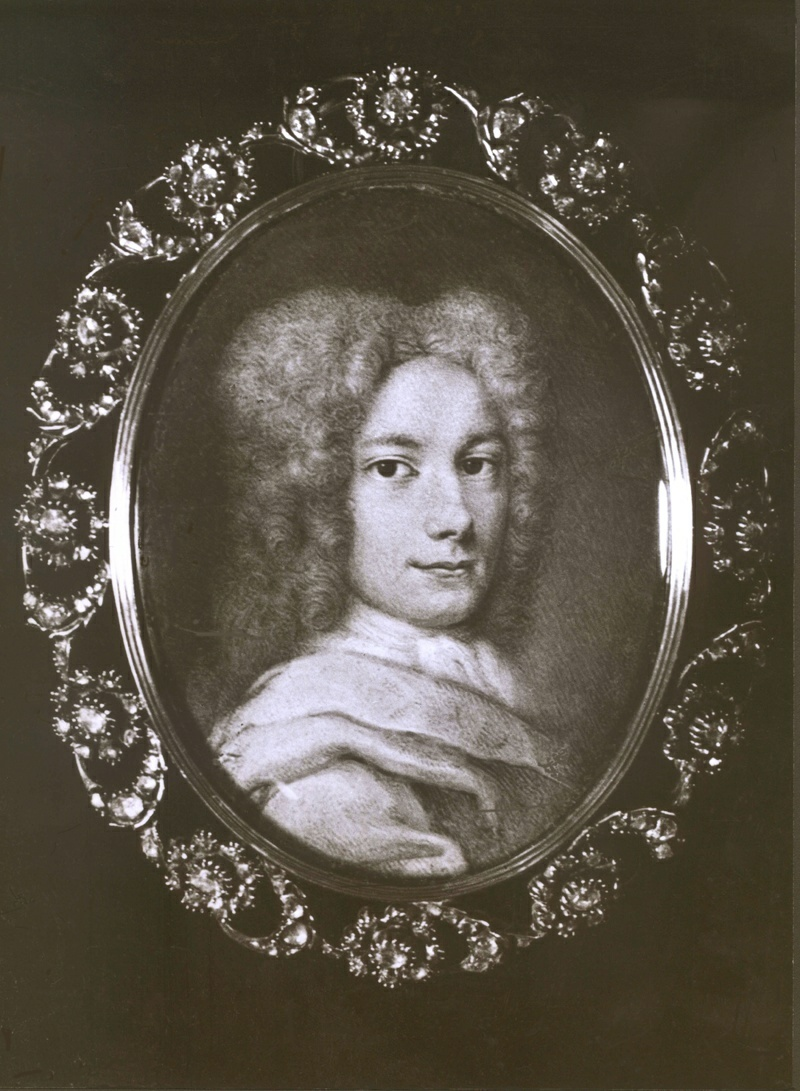
Handel as a young man

Almira was a resounding success. The opera was performed twenty times in total until its place was taken by Handel's next opera, Nero, the music of which has not been preserved.

The first modern performance of Almira took place on 23 February 1985, Handel's 300th birthday, at Leipzig's Städtische Oper.

As with all of Handel's operas, after going unperformed for many years, Almira is presented by opera houses and festivals today. Among other performances, Almira was staged by operamission in New York City in 2012 and by the Boston Early Music Festival in 2013.

== Roles ==
Roles, voice types, and premiere cast
| Role | Voice type | Premiere cast, 8 January 1705 |
|---|---|---|
| Almira, Queen of Castilia | soprano | Frau Conradin |
| Edilia, a Princess | soprano | Barbara Keiser |
| Consalvo, Almira's guardian | bass | Gottfried Grünewald |
| Osman, his son | tenor | Johann Konrad Dreyer |
| Fernando, an orphan | tenor | Johann Mattheson |
| Raymondo, King of Mauretania | bass | Gottfried Grünewald |
| Bellante, Princess of Aranda | soprano | Frau Rischmüller |
| Tabarco | tenor | Christoph Rauch |

== Synopsis ==
The fictional story is set in medieval Valladolid.

=== Act 1 ===
Princess Almira has inherited the throne from her father and the opera opens with her coronation. The new queen is disconcerted when her guardian Consalvo claims that her father entrusted him with his dying wish, namely that Almira should marry someone from "Consalvo's house" and since he only has one son, a rather feckless army officer called Osman, it would seem her father wished her to marry him. This is unwelcome news to Almira as she is desperately in love with her private secretary, a young man of unknown parentage named Fernando. Osman is not unhappy to be elevated to royal status in this way, but he too is already in love with someone else, the Princess Edilia. At an elaborate court entertainment, Almira mistakenly believes that her beloved Fernando is flirting with Edilia and becomes consumed with jealousy. The restless and jaded Osman attends another brilliant festivity given by Princess Bellante.

=== Act 2 ===
Princess Bellante has fallen in love with Osman, but Osman's father, Consalvo, is amorously pursuing Bellante, which she finds annoying and tries to put a stop to. Osman, although in love with Edilia, thinks it will be grand to be a royal personage, so is keen to marry Almira, and asks Fernando, whom he knows has influence with Almira, to speak to her on his behalf. The king of Mauretania, Raymondo, disguising himself as the "ambassador" from Mauretania, makes an appearance at Almira's court and tries to win her love. Almira is not interested, being still in love with her secretary Fernando, although she has never told him so. She goes to him to confess her devotion, but Osman appears and, desiring Almira not for herself but the status he would gain as her husband, is about to stab Fernando when Almira grabs the dagger from him. Edilia gets wind of the fact that her sweetheart Osman is now keen to marry Almira and throws a jealous fit. A servant of Fernando, called Tabarco, comes across correspondence from these various people in these love tangles, and opens and reads all their letters.

=== Act 3 ===
At an elaborate court masque in honour of Raymondo, Fernando, Osman and Consalvo allegorically impersonate Europe, Asia and Africa. Raymondo now tries to woo Edilia, but she is still in love with Osman. Princess Bellante once again rebuffs the unwelcome attentions of Consalvo. In fact Bellante is now smitten with Osman. Tabarco hands a goodbye letter and a family heirloom, a ruby, from Fernando to Almira, and when Consalvo sees the ruby he realises that Fernando is his long lost son. Now Almira can marry Fernando and still fulfill her father's dying wish, Bellante will marry Osman and Edilia will accept Raymondo after all. All celebrate the fortunate outcome of events.

== Context and analysis ==
Almira is a mix of spectacle, as in the opening coronation scene and the masque in the third act, dance, comedy and drama. Paul O'Dette, artistic co-director of the Boston Early Music Festival, where the opera was staged in 2013, says of this very early work by the teenaged Handel:

From the first page of the overture, it just overflows with genius and invention. You can't believe that an overture of this brilliance could have been written as Handel's first attempt, because most composers never achieve this level of invention after a whole career.

The opera is scored for two traversos, two oboes, bassoon, three trumpets, timpani, strings and continuo (cello, lute, harpsichord).

== Arrangements ==
In 1732 the piece was once more performed in a version edited by Georg Philipp Telemann.

In 1879 Franz Liszt composed a transcription of the Sarabande and Chaconne from the opening act of this opera for his English piano student Walter Bache. Noted by critics as one of the most striking of Liszt's late paraphrases as well as his only setting of a baroque piece from his late period, this work is said to anticipate Ferruccio Busoni's late-romantic settings of Bach. Australian Liszt scholar and pianist Leslie Howard has recorded this work as part of Hyperion Records' complete Liszt series.

== Recordings ==
- 1994 – Ann Monoyios (Almira), Patricia Rozario (Edilia), Linda Gerard (Bellante), David Thomas (Consalvo), Douglas Nasrawi (Osman), Jamie MacDougall (Fernando), Olaf Haye (Raymondo), Christian Elsner (Tabarco) – Fiori musicali, Andrew Lawrence-King – 3 CDs (CPO)
- 2018 – Emőke Baráth (Almira), Amanda Forsythe (Edilia), Teresa Wakim (Bellante), Christian Immler (Consalvo), Zachary Wilder (Osman), Colin Balzer (Fernando), Jesse Blumberg (Raymondo), Jan Kobow (Tabarco) – Boston Early Music Festival Orchestra, Paul O'Dette and Stephen Stubbs – 4 CDs (CPO)

== See also ==
- List of compositions by George Frideric Handel
- List of operas by Handel
- Handel's lost Hamburg operas
