= Hamburg State Opera =

German opera company

Hamburgische Staatsoper Hamburg State Opera
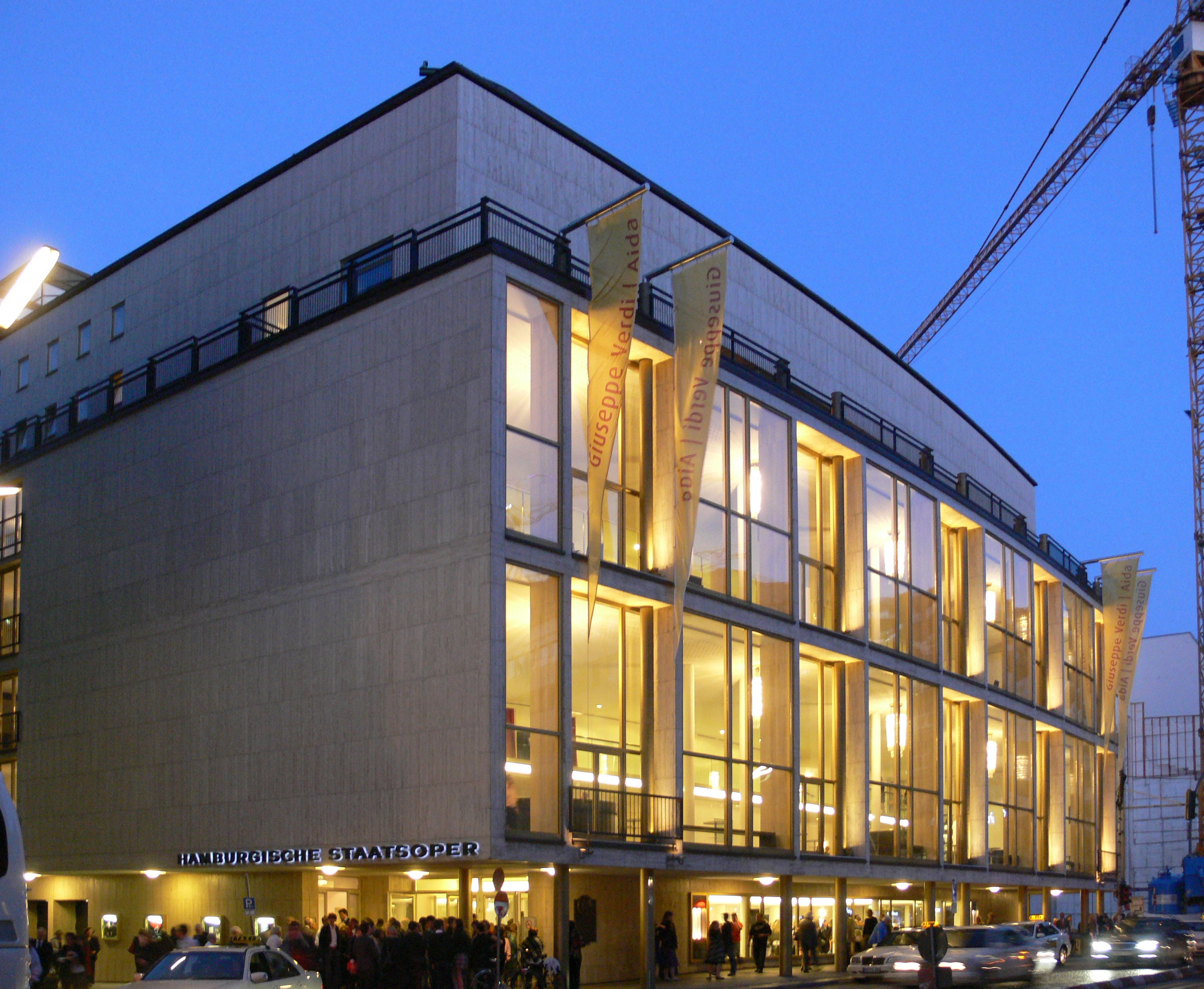
- The Opera's front façade on Dammtorstraße in 2010
- Interactive map of Hamburgische Staatsoper; Hamburg State Opera
- Former names: Hamburgische Oper; Hamburgisches Stadt-Theater
- Location: Große Theaterstraße 25, 20354 Hamburg, Germany
- Coordinates: 53°33′24″N 9°59′20″E
- Capacity: 1,690
- Type: opera house
- Public transit: Gänsemarkt (50 m); Stephansplatz (100 m)

Construction
- Built: 1678
- Opened: 2 January 1678
- Renovated: 2002–05
- Rebuilt: 1826–27; 1953–55
- Architects: Girolamo Sartorio (1678 building); Carl Ludwig Wimmel (1827 building); Gerhard Weber (1955 building)

Website
- www.hamburgische-staatsoper.de

The Hamburg State Opera (in German: Hamburgische Staatsoper) is an opera company based in Hamburg, Germany. Its theatre is near the square of Gänsemarkt. Since the 2025/26 season, the Intendant of the company is Tobias Kratzer, and the Generalmusikdirektor is Omer Meir Wellber.

== History ==
Opera in Hamburg dates to 2 January 1678 when the Oper am Gänsemarkt was inaugurated with a performance of a biblical Singspiel by Johann Theile. It was not a court theatre but the first public opera house in Germany established by the art-loving citizens of Hamburg, a prosperous member of the Hanseatic League.

The Hamburg Bürgeroper resisted the dominance of the Italianate style and rapidly became the leading musical center of the German Baroque. In 1703, George Friedrich Handel was engaged as violinist and harpsichordist and performances of his operas were not long in appearing. In 1705, Hamburg gave the world première of his opera Nero.

In 1721, Georg Philipp Telemann, a central figure of the German Baroque, joined the Hamburg Opera, and in subsequent years Christoph Willibald Gluck, Johann Adolph Hasse and various Italian companies were among the guests.

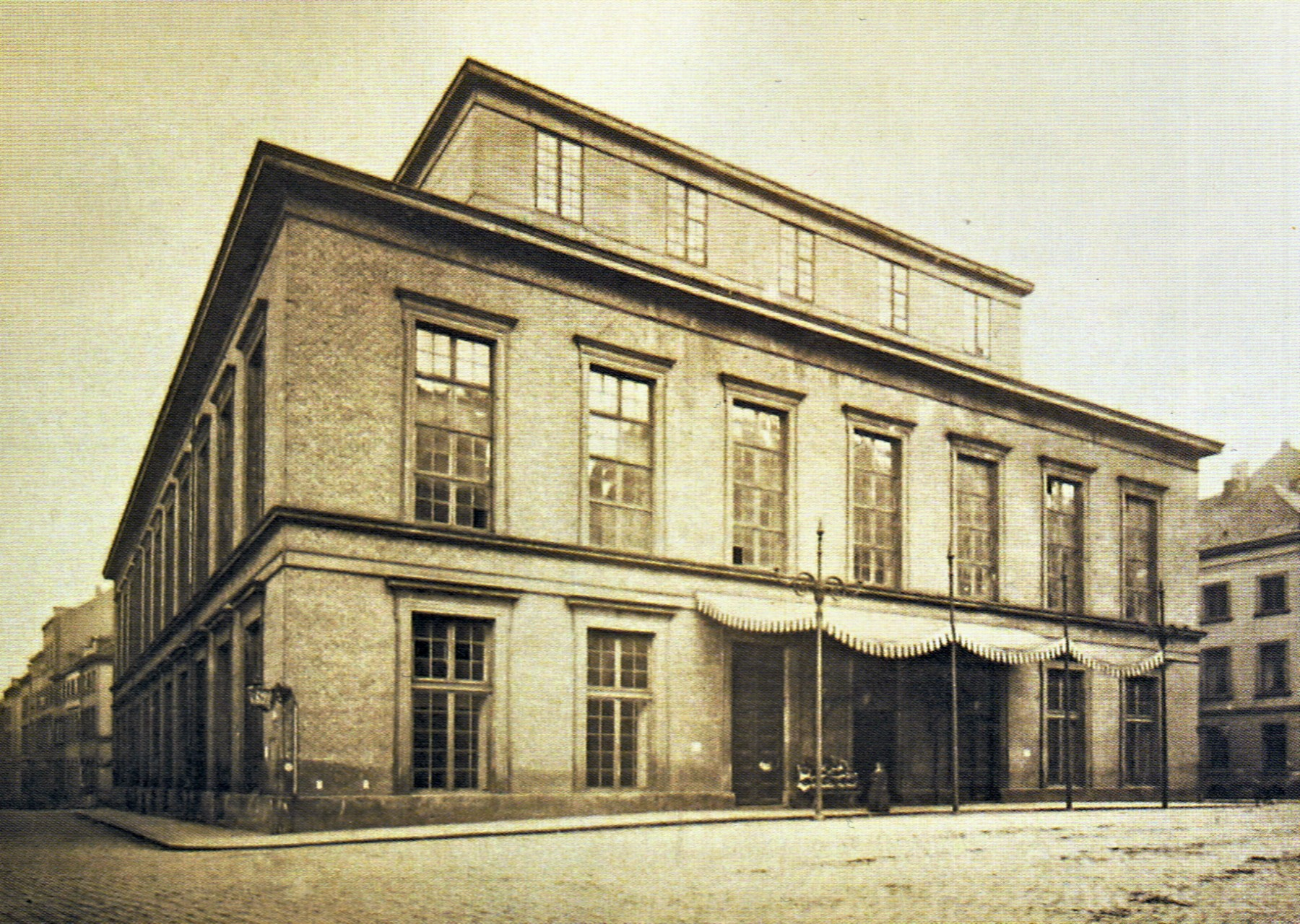
The Stadt-Theater, built in 1827

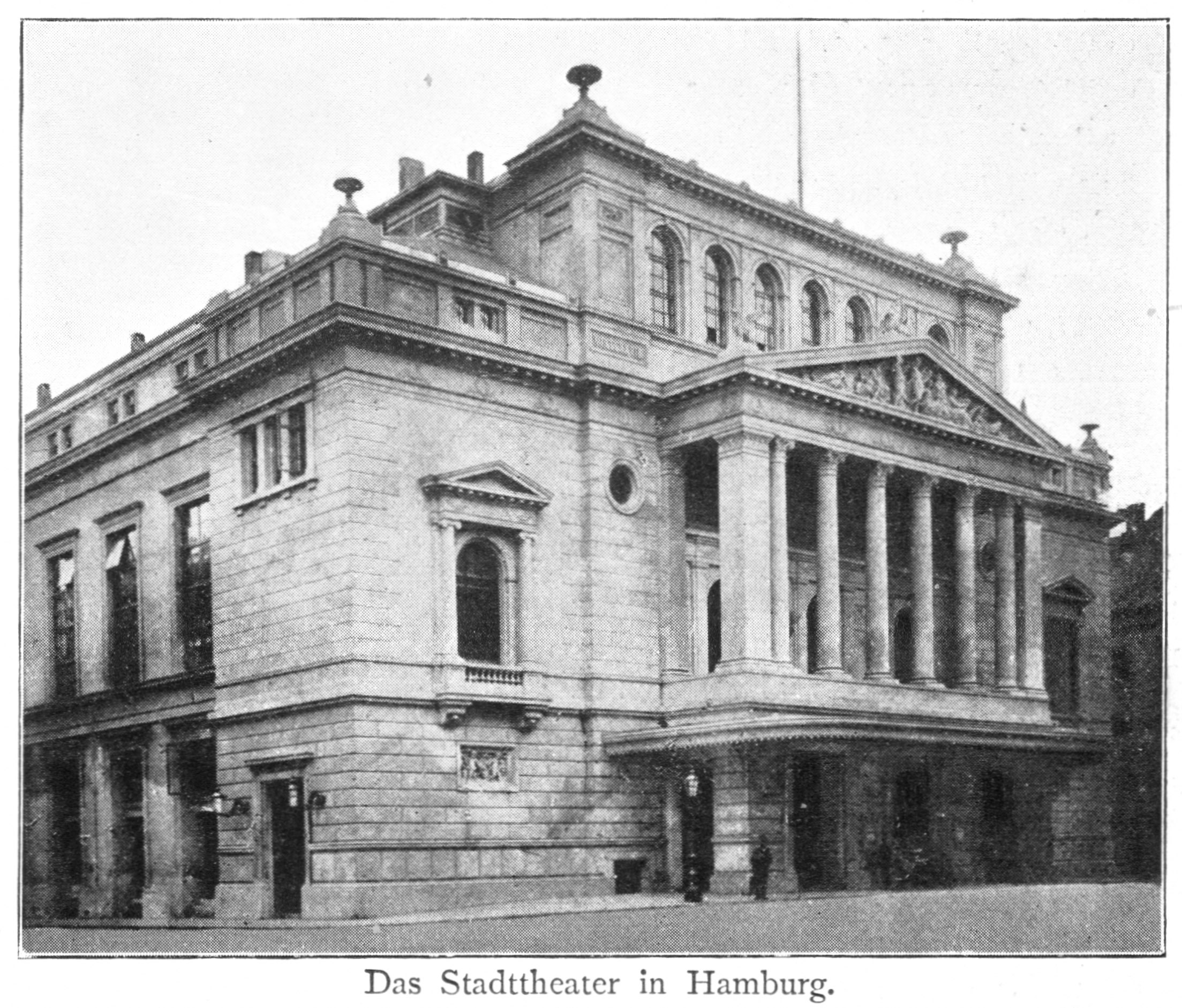
The same building, redecorated in 1890, destroyed in 1943

To replace the aging wooden structure, the first stone was laid on 18 May 1826 for the Stadt-Theater on the present-day site of the Hamburg State Opera. The new theater, with seating for 2,800 guest, was inaugurated less than a year later with Beethoven's incidental music to Egmont.

In 1873, both the exterior and interior of the structure were renovated in the reigning "Gründerzeit" style of the time, and again in 1891, when electric lighting was introduced.

Under the direction of Bernhard Pollini, the house mounted its first complete Ring Cycle in 1879. In 1883, the year of Wagner's death, a cycle comprising nine of his operas commenced. The musical directors Hans von Bülow (from 1887 to 1890) and Gustav Mahler (from 1891 to 1897) also contributed to the fame of the opera house.

In the beginning of the 20th century, opera was an important part of the theatre's repertoire; among the 321 performances during the 1907–08 season, 282 were performances of opera. From 1922 to 1935 Leopold Sachse was general director of the theatre.

The Stadt-Theater performed not only established repertoire but also new works, such as Paul Hindemith's Sancta Susanna, Igor Stravinsky's The Soldier's Tale, Ernst Krenek's Jonny spielt auf, and Leoš Janáček's Jenůfa. Ferruccio Busoni's Die Brautwahl (1912) and Erich Wolfgang Korngold's Die tote Stadt (1920) both had their world premieres in Hamburg. In the 1930s, after Hitler came to power, the opera house was renamed Hamburgische Staatsoper.

On the night of 2 August 1943, both the auditorium and its neighbouring buildings were destroyed during air raids by fire-bombing; a low-flying airplane dropped several petrol and phosphorus containers onto the middle of the roof of the auditorium, causing it to erupt into a conflagration.

The current Staatsoper opened on 15 October 1955 with Mozart's Die Zauberflöte. Hamburg continued to devote itself to new works, such as Hans Werner Henze's The Prince of Homburg (1960), Stravinsky's The Flood (1963), Gian Carlo Menotti's Help, Help, the Globolinks! (1968), and Mauricio Kagel's Staatstheater (1971).

Tiers in the hall, 2026

In 1967, under the direction of Joachim Hess, the Hamburg State Opera became the first company to broadcasts its operas in color on television, beginning with Die Hochzeit des Figaro (a German translation of Le Nozze di Figaro). Ten of these television productions have been released on DVD by ArtHaus Musik as Cult Opera of the 1970s, as well as separately. All of these were performed in German regardless of the original language (six were written in German, one in French, two in English, and one in Italian).

More recently, Hamburg gave the world premières of Wolfgang Rihm's Die Eroberung von Mexico (1992) and Helmut Lachenmann's Das Mädchen mit den Schwefelhölzern (1997), for which it received much international acclaim. The company has won the "Opera House of the Year" award by the German magazine Opernwelt in 1997 and in 2005.

Recent General Music Directors (GMD) have included Ingo Metzmacher and Simone Young. Young was the first female GMD in the company's history, serving from 2005 to 2015. Kent Nagano became GMD as of the 2015–2016 season, with an initial contract of 5 seasons. In October 2017, the company announced the extension of Nagano's Hamburg contract through 2025. Nagano is scheduled to conclude his tenure as GMD at the close of the 2024–2025 season. In February 2023, the company announced the appointment of Omer Meir Wellber as its new GMD, effective with the 2025–2026 season.

Georges Delnon stood down as the company's Intendant in 2025. In December 2022, the company announced the appointment of Tobias Kratzer as successor, effective in the summer of 2025. Kratzer directed Monster's Paradise, a satire/horror opera about king-president in an oval office.

== General Music Directors (GMD) ==
- Eugen Jochum (1934–1949)
- Joseph Keilberth (1951–1959)
- Wolfgang Sawallisch (1961–1973)
- Horst Stein (1973–1976)
- Aldo Ceccato (1976–1982)
- Hans Zender (1984–1988)
- Gerd Albrecht (1988–1997)
- Ingo Metzmacher (1997–2005)
- Simone Young (2005–2015)
- Kent Nagano (2015–2025)
- Omer Meir Wellber (2025– )

== See also ==
- Philharmonisches Staatsorchester Hamburg
- List of opera houses
- Category:Opera world premieres at the Hamburg State Opera
