= Daphne (Handel) =

Opera by Georg Friedrich Händel

- Lost opera by George Frideric Handel
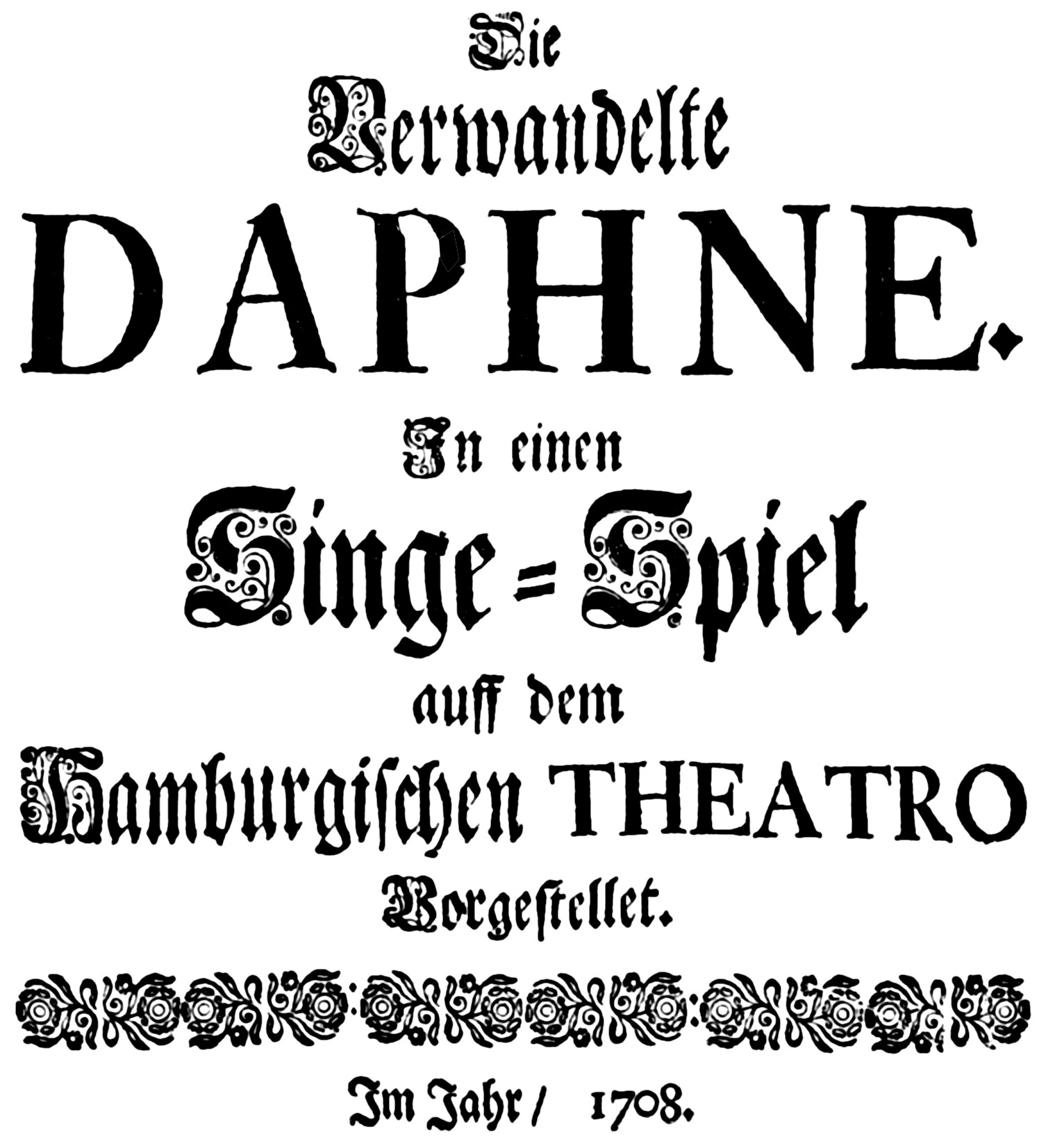
- Title page of the libretto, 1708
- Translation: Daphne Metamorphosed
- Librettist: Hinrich Hinsch
- Language: German; Italian
- Based on: Daphne myth
- Premiere: January 1708; Oper am Gänsemarkt, Hamburg

Daphne or Die Verwandelte Daphne (Daphne Metamorphosed), HWV 4, is an opera composed by Handel for the Oper am Gänsemarkt in Hamburg in 1706, to a libretto by Hinrich Hinsch. The opera, based on the Daphne myth, was the second part of a double opera. Both works were first performed in Hamburg in January 1708. While the music is lost, the libretto survived, and two suites were reconstructed.

== History ==
Georg Friedrich Händel composed Die Verwandelte Daphne at the request of Reinhard Keiser, the manager of the Oper am Gänsemarkt in 1706. The opera was the second part of a double opera, with the first part, Florindo. Origibally both works were planned for one evening. The libretto, based on the Daphne myth, was by Hinrich Hinsch, a lawyer, who also wrote the text for Keiser's first opera in Hamburg, Mahumet II (1696), based on the life of Mehmet II. Hinsch had been writing librettos since 1681. He died in 1712.

After completing Daphne, Händel only taught and studied music by colleagues. He prepared his departure to Italy where he planned to study further; he copied Keiser's opera Octavia and took it along on his journey.

Daphne was first performed at the Theater am Gänsemarkt in January 1708. It was probably directed from the harpsichord by Christoph Graupner.

Only fragments of the score survive, but a copy of the libretto exists in the Library of Congress.

== Roles ==
- Phoebus, in love with Daphne
- Daphne, daughter of Pineus, to marry Florindo
- Florindo, son of Enipheus, to marry Daphne, secretly loved by Alfirena
- Lycoris, nymph, in love with Florindo
- Damon, shepherd, in love with Lycoris
- Galathea, old nymph, Daphne's confidante
- Alfirena, daughter of Apidinus, secretly in love with Florindo
- Tyrsis, shepherd from Arcadia, Damon's friend
- Cupido, god of love
- shepherds, priests

== Plot ==
The plot rests on a conflict between gods Phoebus and Cupido. It follows traditions to deal with love, often unrequited and leading to suffering, and depicts complex intrigue and intricate love relationships, alluding to death, hatred and revenge.

== Suites ==
Two suites from Daphne were reconstructed and were published by Bärenreiter in a collection of single pieces orchestral music by Handel, as part of their complete edition of Handel's works, one in B-flat major, HWV 352, and one in G major, HWV353. The Suite in G major was recorded as part of a collection of Handel's music for Hamburg, Handel in Hamburg, by the ensemble Parley of Instruments conducted by Peter Holman and released in 1998.
