= Johann Georg Conradi =

German composer

Johann Georg Conradi (1645 in Oettingen – 22 May 1699) was a German composer. He was, with Johann Theile, Nicolaus Adam Strungk, Johann Philipp Fortsch, Johann Wolfgang Franck and Johann Sigismund Kusser one of the main composers of the early Oper am Gänsemarkt.
