= Octavia (opera) =

Opera in three acts by Reinhard Keiser to a libretto by Barthold Feind

- Singspiel in three acts by Reinhard Keiser
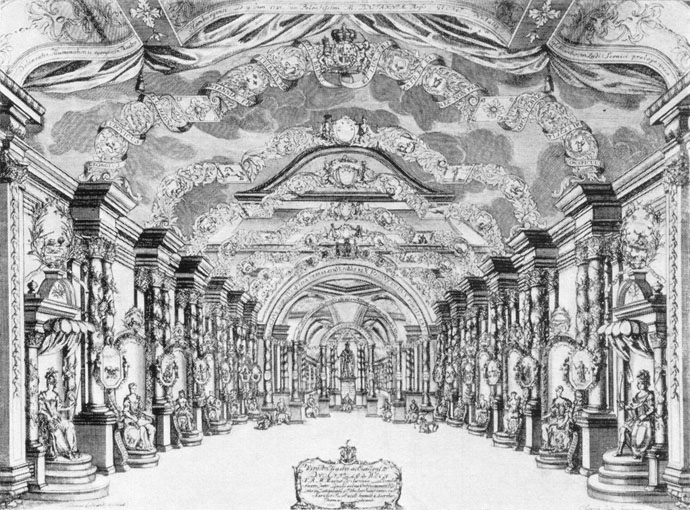
- Oper am Gänsemarkt, Hamburg, location of the premiere of Octavia
- Native title: Die römische Unruhe, oder Die edelmütige Octavia
- Translation: The Roman Unrest, or The Noble-Minded Octavia
- Librettist: Barthold Feind
- Language: German
- Premiere: 5 August 1705; Oper am Gänsemarkt, Hamburg

The Roman Unrest, or The Noble-Minded Octavia (German: Die römische Unruhe, oder Die edelmütige Octavia), commonly called Octavia, is a singspiel in three acts by Reinhard Keiser to a German libretto by Barthold Feind. It premiered on 5 August 1705 at the Oper am Gänsemarkt, Hamburg.

The work was written in response to Handel's now-lost Nero, using the same period, material and plot but with Feind substantially improving the libretto. It unites the insidious machinations of the mad emperor Nero, including the assassination plots against his stepsister and wife Octavia, the Pisonian conspiracy and its suppression, with a multicoloured sub-plot of the philosophical instructions of the wise Seneca versus the amusing observations of a clown named Davus. The action is held together by the interweaving of all these plots.

It has an abundance of slippery allusions, grotesque elements like a ballet of the dead, which seems to have been taken from a Shakespearean comedy, but above all shows its librettist's opposition to happy endings beloved of his Hamburg audiences.

Octavia is notable among Keisers's work for its lavish orchestration; it is the first recorded use of horns in an opera, and one aria calls for five bassoons.

A production of Die edelmütige Octavia took place at the Jesuit College Innsbruck as part of the Festival of Old Music in Innsbruck festival in August 2017.

== Roles ==
| Role | Voice type | Premiere cast, date (Conductor: ) |
|---|---|---|
| Claudia Octavia | Soprano | |
| Nero | Bass | |
| Fabius | Tenor | |
| Piso | Tenor | |
| Lepidus | Tenor | |
| Seneca the Younger | Bass | |
| Davus, clown | Tenor | |
| King Tiridates | Alto castrato | |
| Ormoena | Soprano | |
| Livia | Soprano | |
| Clelia | Soprano | |
