= Florindo =

Opera by Georg Friedrich Händel

- Lost opera by George Frideric Handel
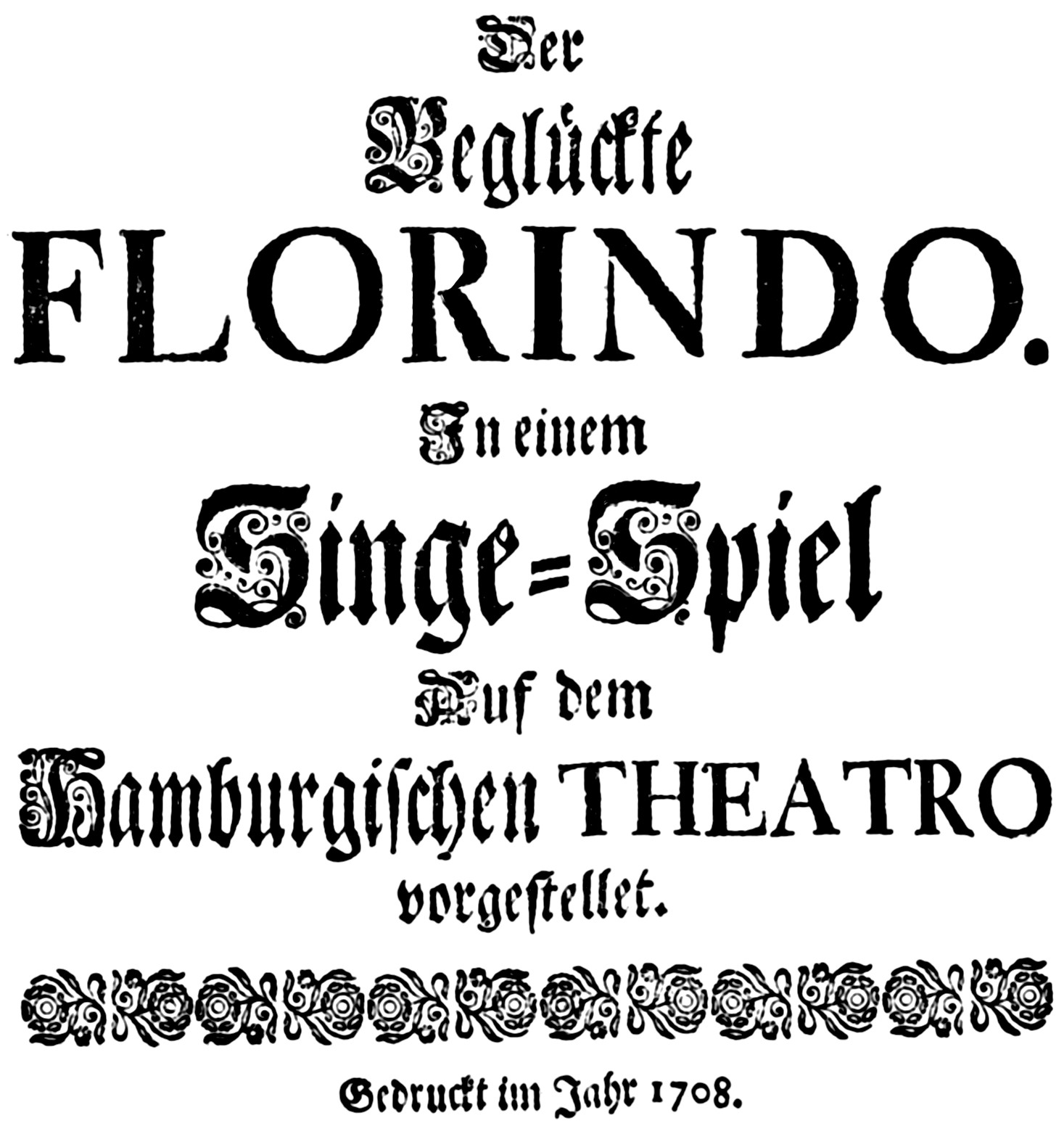
- Title page of the libretto, 1708
- Librettist: Hinrich Hinsch
- Language: German; Italian
- Premiere: January 1708; Theater am Gänsemarkt, Hamburg

Der beglückte Florindo (The Delighted Florindo), HWV 3, is an opera composed by Handel at the request of Reinhard Keiser, the manager of the Hamburg Opera. It was first performed (after Handel had left for Italy) at the Oper am Gänsemarkt in January 1708. It was probably directed from the harpsichord by Christoph Graupner and took place most likely after Handel's completion of his first Italian opera, Rodrigo.

The opera was the first part of a double opera, with the second part, Die verwandelte Daphne, intended to be performed on the following evening, with the total title being Florindo and Daphne. Keiser inserted a play in low German, called die lustige Hochzeit, into the opera, afraid that the audience would get tired otherwise. Handel was not pleased, according to Romain Rolland. Only fragments of the score survive, but a copy of the libretto exists in the Library of Congress. Both operas totaled 100 musical numbers, 55 in the first and 45 in the second but these were written as to be spread over two nights as was customary at the time.

The libretto was by Hinrich Hinsch, a lawyer, who also wrote the text for Keiser's first opera in Hamburg: Mahumet II (1696), based on the life of Mehmet II. Hinsch had been writing librettos since 1681. He died in 1712.

== Roles ==
Name	Character	Voice Type	Premiere Singer
Daphne	Daughter of Pineus	Soprano	Anna-Margaretha Conradi
Florindo	Son of Enipheus	Tenor	Johann Konrad Dreyer
Alfirena	Daughter of Apidinus		
Phoebus	Suitor of Daphne		
Lycoris	Nymph		
Damon	Shepherd		
Pineus	Promised love of Florindo		
Tyrsis	Noble shepherd from Arcadia, Damon's friend		
Enipheus	Florindo's Father		
Cupid	God of Love		
Vulcanus	God of Fire		
Galatea	Old Nymp		
Shepherds, shepherdesses, cyclops, tritons, naiads			

== Plot ==
The opera takes place in the sixth century and is set in Thessaly.

=== Act 1 ===
The thanksgiving festival in honor of the god Phoebus (Apollo) takes place in a beautiful landscape. He killed the cruel dragon Python. Cupid also appears at the festival, and when he is mocked by Phoebus, he swears revenge. Daphne, Florindo's lover and already promised to him, meets Phoebus on the sidelines of the festival, and the son of Zeus falls in love with the daughter of the river god Pineus.

Alfirena sings about her unhappy love for the already taken Florindo. In the meantime, he meets his bride for a shepherd's hour, and they both decide to get the wedding started today. The nymph Lycoris, who is also in love with Florindo, is in turn lusted after by the shepherd Damon. But they court each other and indulge in their respective heartbreaks. So the first act ends with two lovesick people who cannot be comforted.

=== Act 2 ===
Daphne and Florindo successfully asked their fathers Pineus and Enipheus for consent to their marriage. When Florindo is alone again, Lycoris tries to approach him. But she unsuccessfully woos his love, while Alfirena, who is also in love with Florindo, keeps her pain to herself. She wants to carry this love for herself and not dare to attack his virtue. When Daphne and Phoebus meet, Cupid again intervenes in directing their love affairs. He stays hidden and can follow how the two get closer. Daphne confesses to Phoebus that although she knows the splendor and splendor of his power in heaven, in the clouds and on earth, and also knows that she will have great happiness through him, "whoever approaches the fire loses his face."

Yet she is aware that her heart is melting and her spirit is beginning to take on new fire. But Phoebus hasn't won yet. He consoles himself for later, while Daphne, left alone, desperately weighs up her two options. Alfirena, who still loves Florindo, still knows little about the aforementioned events. Because Florindo loves Daphne, who was promised to him as a parent, Alfirena wants to bear her sadness alone. Daphne, who has come closer, sees her sadness, and through this Alfirena learns that the planned wedding is to take place the next morning. But Daphne's insecurity is noticeable.

=== Act 3 ===
In the forge of the fire god Vulcanus, he receives Cupid and both agree not to support Phoebus' love for the still resisting Daphne. The arrow to be forged by Vulcan is intended to turn Daphne's love into hatred, because none of the gods want to see Daphne rule from heaven at Phoebus' side. Cupid is happy that his revenge on Phoebus will be successful. Lycoris visits Alfirena when she, in agony, says goodbye to the idea of getting Florindo's affection after all, and suspects that, in addition to her, Alfirena is now also falling for Florindo. In a discussion that ensues, Lycoris learns that she is right, but also admits that she loves Florindo. The two become friends despite the looming hopelessness.

Damon finds his beloved Lycoris sleeping in the grass. He wants to protect her and prevent anyone from doing anything bad to her. Tyrsis comes along and is amazed at the protective care, but also fears negative effects, which eventually go so far that Damon suspects a fly on Lycoris' face is a transformed Jupiter who wants to cool his "hot heat". Damon tries in vain to catch the fly with his hand, instead he accidentally hits Lycoris, who jumps up angrily, in the face.

Damon jumps behind a tree in shock. Tyrsis tries to calm Lycoris and persuade him to show Damon some good words and gestures. He's probably happy with that. Florindo and Daphne's wedding celebration begins. Alfirena, Galathea, Tyrsis, Lycoris and the entire choir of shepherds appear. Florindo continues to greet the flock of nymphs. Even Phoebus now descends from heaven and lets the wedding party celebrate him.

== Music ==
The scores of both operas are lost. One can assume that Handel left his Autographs in Hamburg because there was apparently the hope that they would still be performed there. But they probably weren't in good hands there. Handel himself had an excellent reference library of his own works since his stay in Italy, so that if he had ever taken a copy with him, these scores would probably have been preserved for us in this way. However, the statement of the singer Johann Konrad Dreyer, who was co-tenant of the opera house after Keiser's departure (September 1706) and was therefore responsible for its continued operation, about the difficulties of restarting work does not shed a good light on the safe storage of the sheet music at the opera house.

Only in the “Newman Flower Collection” of the Manchester Central Library and in the Aylesford Collection of the British Library, can surviving remains of the two operas be identified. The twelve instrumental movements (HWV 352–354) in the Aylesford Collection are probably also fragments of the two lost operas. They were created around 1728 by Handel's junior secretary, the harpsichordist Johann Christoph Schmidt Jr., and copied into an anthology by an anonymous writer.

It is considered that the Overture in B major (HWV 336), proposed for Il trionfo del Tempo e del Disinganno but which was rejected by Arcangelo Corelli as “too French”, was the original overture to the opera.
