= Gasparo Sartorio =

Italian Baroque composer

Gasparo Sartorio (1625 or 1626 - 1680) was an Italian Baroque composer, brother of musician Antonio Sartorio and architect Girolamo Sartorio. He was born and died in Venice. He held the post of organist at San Rocco, Venice until his death.

== Selected works ==
- 1671 - Iphide greca (with Domenico Freschi)
