= Reinhard Keiser =

German opera composer (1674–1739)

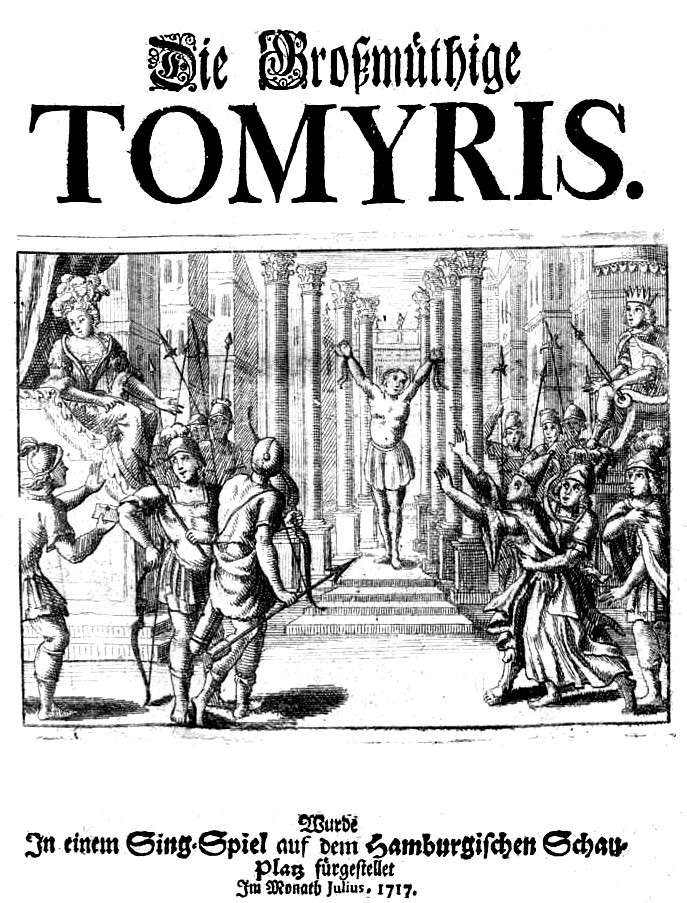
- Title page of an opera libretto
- Born: 9 January 1674; Teuchern, Electorate of Saxony, Holy Roman Empire
- Died: 12 September 1739 (aged 65); Hamburg, Holy Roman Empire
- Occupations: Composer; Opera manager; Director of church music
- Organizations: Oper am Gänsemarkt; Danish Royal Chapel

Reinhard Keiser (9 January 1674 – 12 September 1739) was a German opera composer based in Hamburg. He wrote over a hundred operas. Johann Adolf Scheibe (writing in 1745) considered him an equal to Johann Kuhnau, George Frideric Handel and Georg Philipp Telemann, but his work was largely forgotten for many decades.

== Biography ==
Keiser was born in Teuchern (in present-day Saxony-Anhalt), son of the organist and teacher Gottfried Keiser (born about 1650), and educated by other organists in the town and then from age eleven at the Thomasschule in Leipzig, where his teachers included Johann Schelle and Johann Kuhnau, direct predecessors of Johann Sebastian Bach.

In 1694, he became court-composer to the duke of Brunswick-Wolfenbüttel, though he had probably come to the court already as early as 1692 to study its renowned operas, which had been going on since 1691, when the city had built a 1,200-seat opera house. Keiser put on his first opera Procris und Cephalus there and, the same year, his opera Basilius was put on at Hamburg and, as the musicologist Johann Mattheson noted, "received with great success and applause".

This was a fruitful period for him – composing not only operas, but arias, duets, cantatas, sérénades, church music and big oratorios, background music – all for the city's use.

About 1697 he settled permanently in Hamburg, and became the chief composer at the highly renowned Oper am Gänsemarkt (now rebuilt as the Hamburg State Opera) in Hamburg from 1697 to 1717; however he was actually first the director in 1702, and was not at various times from then to 1717, almost each time due to political instabilities. From 1703 to 1709, Keiser changed the opera house from being a public institution to a commercial venture with two to three performances a week, in contrast to the opera houses intended for the nobility.

He helped transition opera from the mid-Baroque to the late-Baroque. He introduced a more varied type of aria into his operas, with more passive arias, and also faster arias being introduced into his bilingual and non-bilingual operas all by the 1703/04 season, Nebukadnezar, and Salomon.

Early in 1704, when he was conducting the operas Nebukadnezar and Salomon in Hamburg, the season had to be unexpectedly concluded, for reasons most likely related to government affairs. He went to Brunswick, and afterward Weissenfels, to reconnect with areas in which he was previously active. He ended up coming out with a masterpiece, Almira, at Weissenfels, in July.(NB: According to Grove, this was first produced at the Hamburg Goose Mark Opera, presumably by Keiser, on 8 Jan 1705). He stayed there for a while, spending many holidays there, eventually heading back to Hamburg shortly after Easter in 1705, to produce a comeback to Händel's Nero, produced in February 1705.

Keiser would have to face Händel again, but this time he would be at home, and Händel had switched to the phonetic Italian version of his name, Giorgio Friderico Hendel. Händel would put on what was planned as a double opera, but was in fact two, Florindo and Daphne; he did that in January 1708, coming back from Italy. Keiser would counter that by eventually coming out with La forza dell'amore, oder, Die von Paris entführte Helena and Desiderius, König der Langobarden in the 1708/09 season, not as the theatre's manager, but as someone responding to political insecurities causing the opera company to be disorderly. Keiser worked in the background.

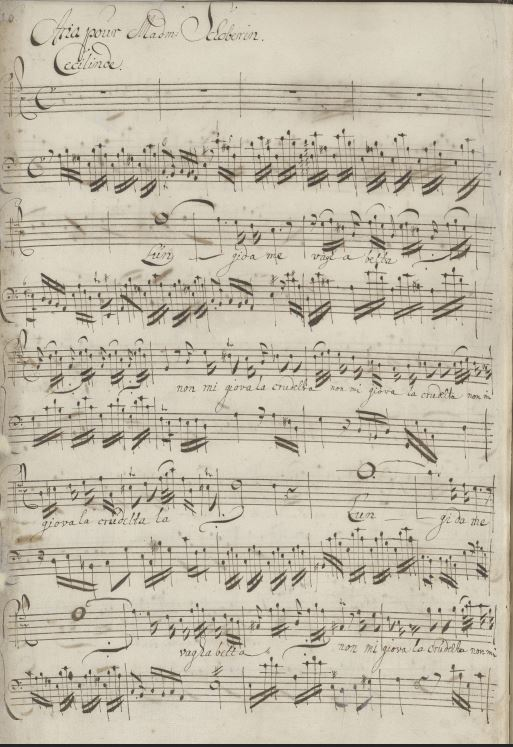
Manuscript of the beginning of an opera aria

Keiser would continue as the director probably when things got more stable in the city, maybe in 1710, and he advanced in composing, coming with his own passion music in 1712, which Händel would readily challenge in 1716.

In 1718, with the Hamburg Opera defunct, he left Hamburg to seek other employment, going to Thuringia and then Stuttgart. From this period, three manuscripts of trio sonatas for flute, violin and basso continuo survive. During the summer of 1721, he returned to Hamburg, but only a few weeks later made a rapid exit to Copenhagen with a Hamburg opera troupe, probably because of the growing influence of Georg Philipp Telemann, engaged by the city magistrate in Keiser's absence. Between 1721 and 1727, Keiser traveled back and forth between Hamburg and Copenhagen, receiving the title of Master of the Danish Royal Chapel.

After the dissolution of the opera troupe, Keiser returned once more to Hamburg, but changes in its operation made repeating past success difficult. Three operas from the period between 1722 and 1734 survive. Personal relations with Telemann remained good, with Telemann programming several productions of Keiser's operas.

In 1728 he became the St. Mary's Cathedral precentor of Hamburg (succeeding Johann Mattheson to the post), and wrote largely church music there until his death in 1739.

In an obituary, his colleague Mattheson described him as "the greatest opera composer in the world".

== Major operas ==
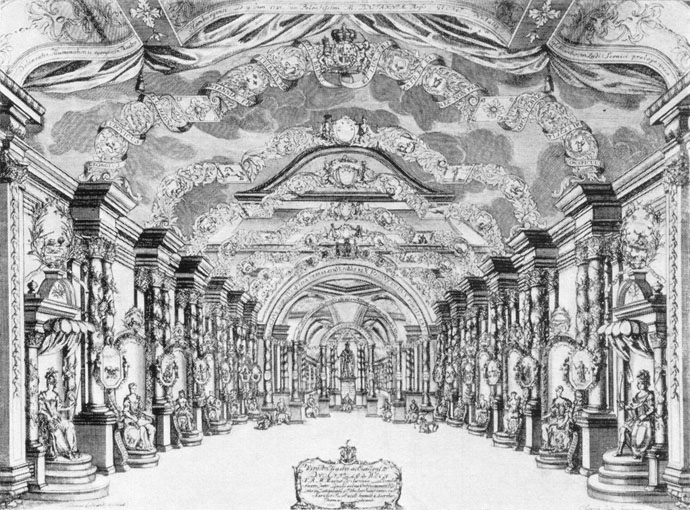
Oper am Gänsemarkt

(First performances in Hamburg, Theater am Gänsemarkt, unless stated otherwise)

- Basilius (Der königliche Schäfer oder Basilius in Arkadien) (probably Braunschweig, 1693)
- Cephalus und Procris (Braunschweig, 1694)
- Der geliebte Adonis (1697)
- The Temple of Janus (Der bei dem allgemeinen Welt-Frieden von dem Großen Augustus geschlossene Tempel des Janus) (1698)
- Iphigenia (Die wunderbar errettete Iphigenia) (1699)
- Herkules und Hebe (Die Verbindung des großen Herkules mit der schönen Hebe) (1699)
- La forza della virtù oder Die Macht der Tugend (1700)
- Störtebeker und Jödge Michels (2 sections, 1701)
- Der Sieg der fruchtbaren Pomona (1702)
- Die sterbende Eurydice oder Orpheus (2 sections, 1702)
- Der verführte Claudius (produced early in 1703)
- Nebukadnezar, König zu Babylon (produced during the 1703/04 opera season)
- Salomon (produced during the 1703/04 opera season)
- Almira (Weissenfels, July 1704)
- Octavia (produced in August 1705)
- Die kleinmütige Selbst-Mörderin Lucretia oder Die Staats-Torheit des Brutus (1705)
- Masaniello furioso (1706)
- Der angenehme Betrug (1707)
- La forza dell'amore oder Die von Paris entführte Helena (1709)
- Desiderius, König der Langobarden (1709)
- Arsinoe (1710)
- Der durch den Fall des großen Pompejus erhöhete Julius Caesar (1710)
- Der hochmütige, gestürzte und wieder erhabene Croesus (1710, revised edition 1730)
- Der sich rächende Cupido (1712, revised 1724)
- L'inganno fedele oder Der getreue Betrug (1714)
- Fredegunda (1715)
- L'Amore verso la patria oder Der sterbende Cato (1715)
- Das zerstörte Troja oder Der durch den Tod Helenens versöhnte Achilles (1716)
- Die großmütige Tomyris (1717)
- Jobates und Bellerophon (1717)
- Ulysses (Copenhagen 1722)
- Bretislaus oder Die siegende Beständigkeit (1725)
- Der lächerliche Prinz Jodelet (1726)
- Lucius Verus oder Die siegende Treue (1728, libretto: Vologeso)

== Oratorios ==
- Der blutige und sterbende Jesus, Hamburg (1704), on words of Christian Friedrich Hunold (Menantes)
- Thränen unter dem Kreutze Jesu, Hamburg (1711)
- Brockes Passion, Hamburg (1712) MS in Berlin.
- Lukas-Passion Wir gingen all in der Irre, Hamburg (1715)
- Seelige / Erlösungs-Gedancken / Aus dem / Oratorio / Der / Zum Tode verurtheilte und gecreutzigte / Jesus ... von / Reinhard Keisern,... Hamburg, Auf Unkosten des Autoris, und zu finden bey seel. Benjamin Schillers Wittwe im Thum / Anno 1715. Hamburg (1715) - Revision of Thränen unter dem Kreutze Jesu
- Der siegende David. Hamburg (1717) MS in Berlin
- Oratorium Passionale 1729: Der blutige und sterbende Jesus, Hamburg (1729), on words of Christian Friedrich Hunold (Menantes)

Spurious / doubtful

- Johannes-Passion – attributed to Friedrich Nicolaus Bruhns (1637–1718)
- Markus-Passion Jesus Christus ist um unsrer Missetat willen verwundet, Hamburg 1705 – also attributed to Bruhns, and to Reinhard's father Gottfried
