= Friedrich Christian Feustking =

German librettist and writer

Friedrich Christian Feustking (1678 – 3 February 1739) was a German theologian, poet and a librettist of operas and Singspiele for the Oper am Gänsemarkt in Hamburg.

Feustking studied theology at the University of Wittenberg and then moved to Hamburg in 1702 where he taught privately. He also wrote, and provided three libretti for the Oper am Gänsemarkt in 1704 through early 1705. In 1705 he was appointed minister in Tolk near Schleswig. In the summer of 1706 he moved to Italy. He died in Tolk on 3 February 1739.

== Works ==
- Die unglückselige Cleopatra, Königin von Egypten oder Die betrogene Staats-Liebe, drama in three acts with music by Johann Mattheson, premiered on 20 October 1704 at the Oper am Gänsemarkt
- Almira, Königin von Castilien with music by Georg Friedrich Händel, premiered on 8 January 1705, repeated 20 times during the following weeks
- Nero, also with music by Handel, premiered on 25 February 1705, music lost
