= Anthony Hicks =

Anthony Hicks (26 June 1943 – 26 May 2010) was a Welsh musicologist, music critic, editor, and writer.

Born in Swansea, a city in Wales, Hicks read mathematics at King's College London during the mid-1960s and worked for roughly a quarter of century as a computer systems analyst at the University of London, until he retired in 1993. Although he was educated in the fields of mathematics and computer science, his personal obsession with baroque music led him to pursue scholarly music research in his spare time. What began as more or less a hobby developed into a highly distinguished para-career as a historian and writer. He became one of the leading 20th-century scholars on George Frideric Handel.

As a music critic, Hicks wrote for Early Music Review and The Musical Times. For the 2001 edition of The New Grove Dictionary of Music and Musicians, he penned Handel's biography and several other Handel related entries. He also authored most of the Handel related articles in the New Grove Dictionary of Opera. He became an important advocate for historically informed performances just as the renewed enthusiasm for baroque music began to take off in the 1960s and 1970s. His research has been used widely in preparing baroque works for recordings and performance; most notably with the Academy of Ancient Music in Cambridge, with whom he worked closely for several decades. Hicks collaborated on recordings with musicians including Christopher Hogwood, Paul McCreesh, Robert King, Trevor Pinnock, Emma Kirkby, John Eliot Gardiner, and Alan Curtis, among many other distinguished baroque performers.

Hicks died at the age of 66 in London in 2010 of pulmonary fibrosis.
