= Linda Gerard =

American singer (1938 – 2014)

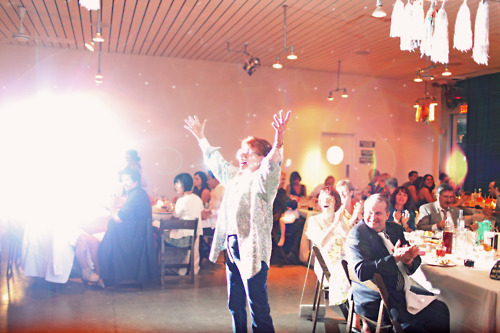

Background information
- Born: Linda Gerard; December 24, 1938; Trenton, New Jersey, United States
- Died: March 21, 2014 (aged 75)
- Genres: Broadway musicals, show tunes, cabaret
- Occupations: Singer, stage actress, cabaret performer

Linda Gerard (December 24, 1938 – March 21, 2014) was a singer, stage actress and cabaret artist based in Palm Springs, California. Originally from Trenton, New Jersey, she had performed on and off Broadway in theater productions, cabaret acts and as a singer across the Eastern seaboard and later in California. Gerard was a self-identified OWL—an older, wiser lesbian.

== Early career ==
Gerard was understudy for Barbra Streisand and Mimi Hines in the original 1960s runs of the musical Funny Girl, taking the stage as Fanny Brice many times. In the sixties and seventies, she developed an original repertoire of comedy and song which she performed at a variety of venues on the East coast.

== Seventies ==
In 1975, she moved from New York City to Provincetown, Massachusetts, where she became the "most talked about cabaret singer in Ptown." She performed at and became co-owner of the Pied Piper. According to the book Ptown: Art, Sex, and Money on the Outer Cape, "During the 1970s, Provincetown's Pied Piper was the foremost lesbian bar on the eastern seaboard, if not in the whole United States. During the summer season, lines snaked around the block, women bouncers guarded the entrance, and inside, women who had come from such faraway places as Montreal and Kansas City flirted, drank, danced." Gerard became co-owner of the Pied Piper when she helped to rebuild the bar after it burnt down on New Year's Eve of 1978. She and her business partner sold the bar in 1987.

== Later years ==
Linda Gerard moved to California, where she opened The Rose Tattoo in 1988, which she envisioned as "a real New York cabaret" in West Hollywood. She performed at The Rose Tattoo through much of the nineties.

In 2008, Gerard was a contestant on the game show Deal or No Deal and won $165,000.

Linda Gerard hosted Sissy Bingo, a Monday bingo night and cabaret performance at King's Highway, a diner at Ace Hotel & Swim Club in Palm Springs. In 2012, Ace Hotel released Linda Gerard: Fabulous Selections, a compilation record of some of Gerard's earlier recorded material including show tunes, jazz standards, sixties-era novelty songs like "See the Cheetah" and the empowerment anthem "A Woman Starting Out All Over Again."

== Death ==
In February 2013, Gerard was diagnosed with Stage 4 lung cancer. She continued to perform and make public appearances until shortly before her death on March 21, 2014.

== Sources ==
- Linda Gerard on Ace Hotel blog
- Linda Gerard interview in Palm Springs Life
- Linda Gerard cabaret review in The New York Times
- Linda Gerard and The Pied Piper in Ptown: Art, Sex, and Money on the Outer Cape
