= Girolamo Sartorio =

Italian architect and engineer

Girolamo Sartonio
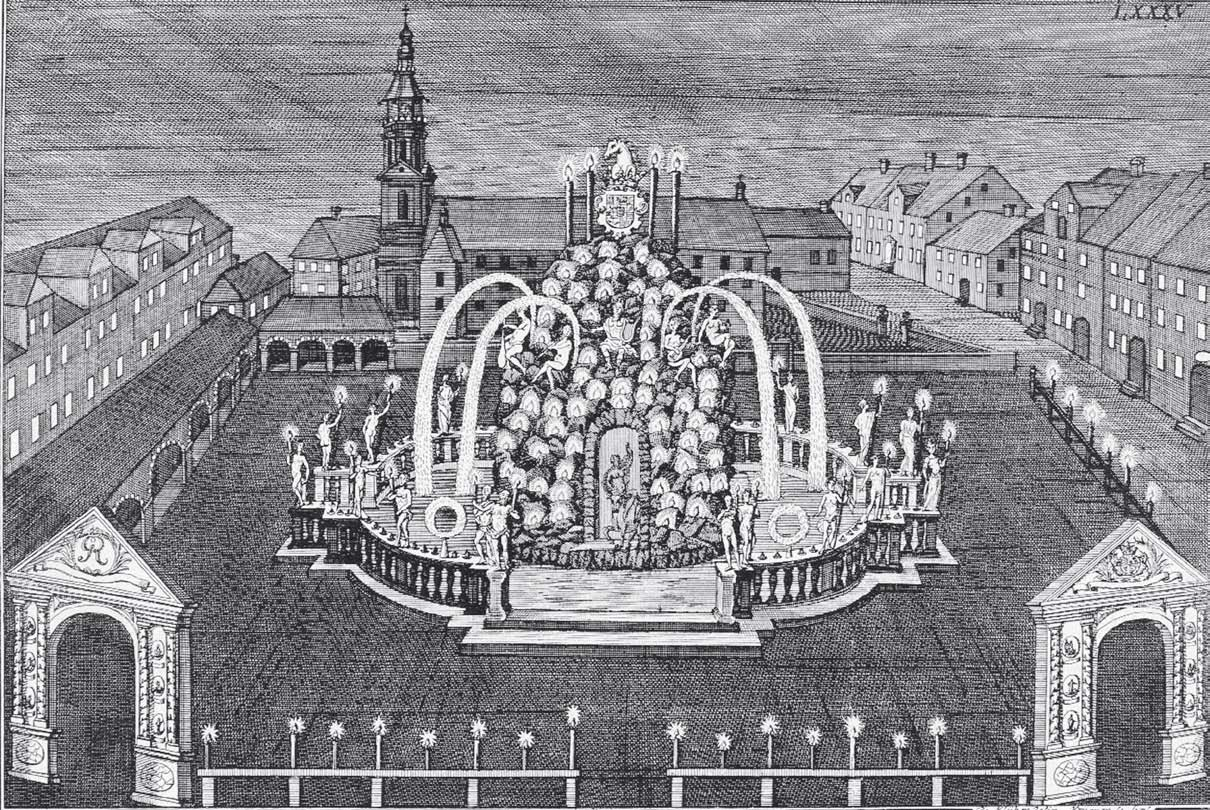
- Sartorio's design for the Neustädter Markt with the Neustädter Kirche and the fountain Parnaßbrunnen, steel engraving by Johann Anton de Klyher, 1727
- Died: 1707; Venice
- Occupations: Architect; Engineer

Girolamo Sartonio, also known as Hieronimo Sartorio and Geronimo Sartorio (died April 1707 in Venice), was an innovative Italian architect and engineer who worked mainly the German cities of Hanover, Hamburg, Leipzig and Erfurt. His designs were based on Palladian architecture. He was a noted expert in the installation of stage equipment and theatrical machinery and also worked as a builder or consulting architect on the construction of various opera houses, such as the Oper am Gänsemarkt in Hamburg. He is also credited with the beginnings of opera in Leipzig and the construction of the opera house in Prague.

== Family ==
Born in Venice, Girolamo was the brother of Venetian composers Antonio Sartorio (1630–1680) and Gasparo Sartorio (1625–1680). In 1673 he married Emerantia Gertrud von Wintheim, the daughter of Erich von Wintheim, in Hanover and he became a citizen of the principality in 1674.

== Life and work ==
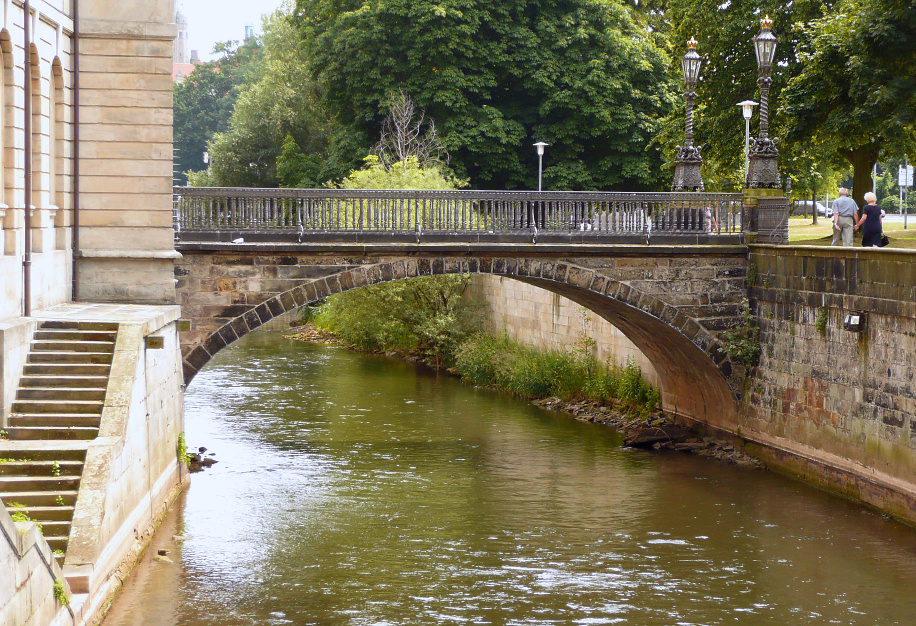
Schlossbrücke across the Leine, designed by Sartorio

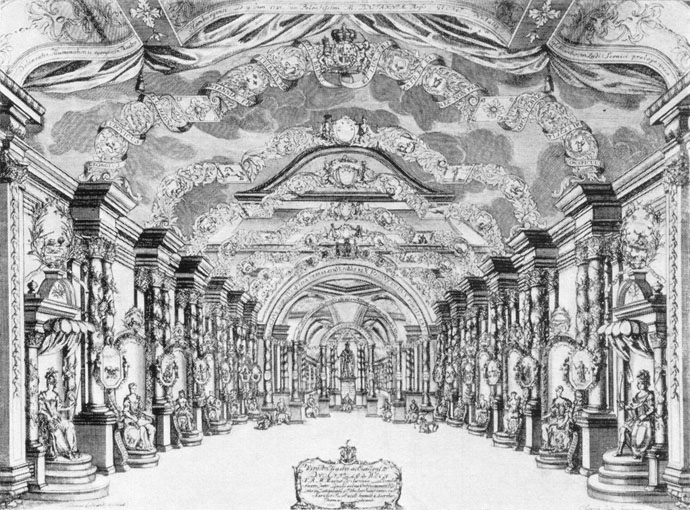
Oper am Gänsemarkt, designed by Sartorio, decorated during a festival in honour of George I of Great Britain

Between 1667 and 1685 Sartorio was the Building Administrator German: Bauverwalter in the service of John Frederick, Duke of Brunswick-Lüneburg and then Ernest Augustus, Elector of Brunswick-Lüneburg in Hanover. During his time he led significant construction projects that beautified the city, including the expansion of the Herrenhausen Gardens and Leineschloss Palace, where he installed a theater and worked on external decorations, the Kapuzinerflügel wing and the court chapel. He also designed the bridge from the Leineschloss across the Leine River and the Neustädter Kirche, built 1667 to 1670 as an early aisleless church. He presented a model for the Parnaßbrunnen fountain on the Neustädter Markt in 1671. During his time in Hanover he wrote a report for the construction of a library in Wolfenbüttel, on a request of Gottfried Wilhelm Leibniz, then a librarian there.

Sartorio was then called to design the first public opera house in Germany and first opera house in Hamburg, the Oper am Gänsemarkt, and construct the stage. It opened in 1678. In 1692/93 he was in Leipzig, where he established the first opera theatre of the city on the Brühl, opened in 1693. From 1696 he worked in Erfurt as Oberbaumeister, responsible for military buildings from 1704.

== Literature ==
- Wilhelm Rothert, A. Rothert, M. Peters: Hannoversche Biographie, vol. 3: Hannover unter dem Kurhut, 1645–1815, Hannover 1912, p. 514 (in German)
- Eduard Schuster: Kunst und Künstler in den Fürstentümern Calenberg und Lüneburg in der Zeit von 1636–1727, Hannover 1905, p. 204 (in German)
- Helmut Zimmermann: Zur Herkunft italienischer Kunsthandwerker im norddeutschen Barock, in: Niederdeutsche Beiträge zur Kunstgeschichte, vol. 34 (1995), p. 150f (in German)
- Bernd Adam: Neue Funde zum barocken Ausbau der Schlossanlage in Hannover-Herrenhausen, in: Niederdeutsche Beiträge zur Kunstgeschichte, vol. 40 (2001), p. 61–66 (in German)
