= Johann Theile =

German composer

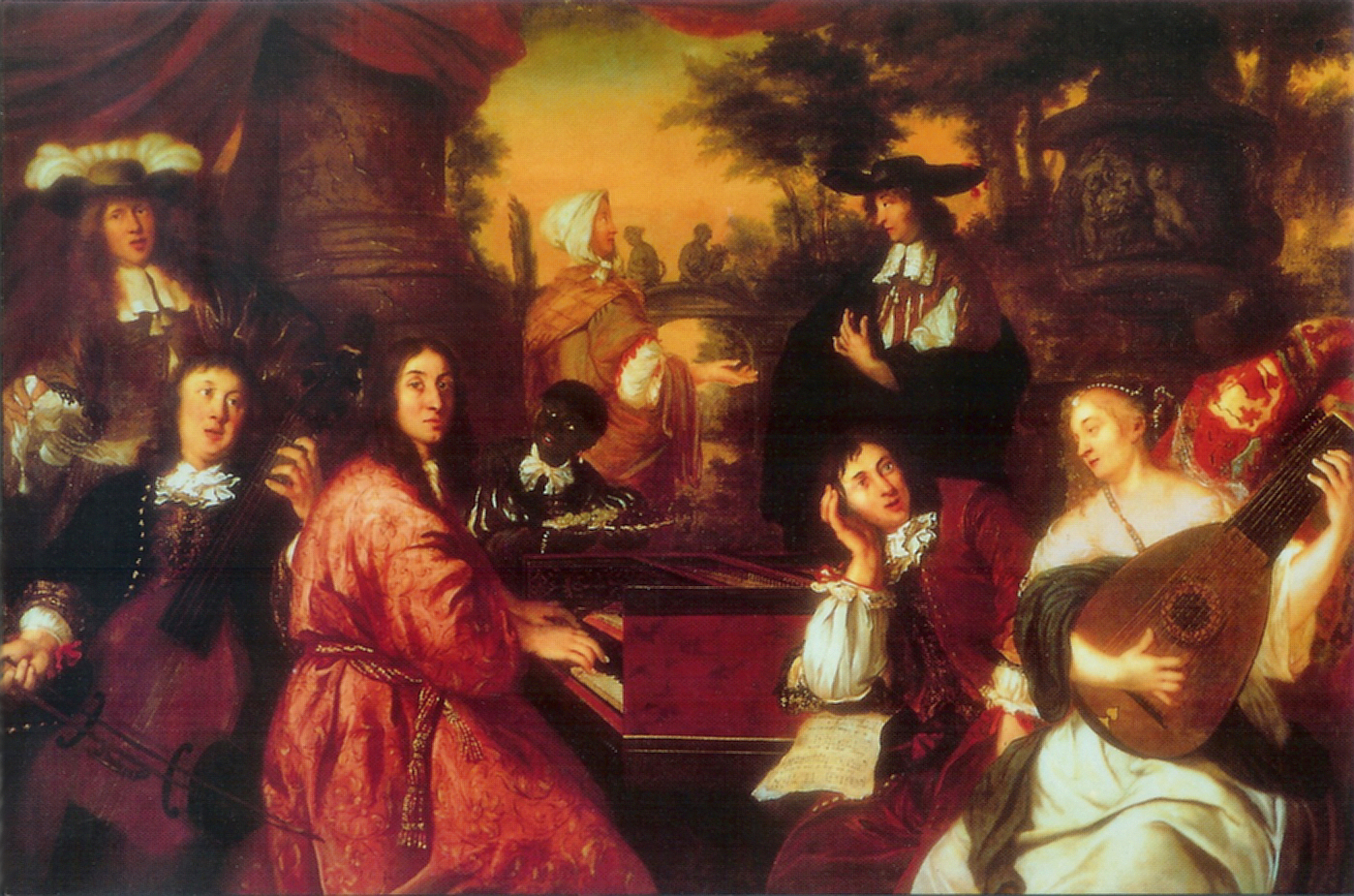
- Johannes Voorhout's Musical Company, 1674; the man on the right, below the harpsichord, is possibly Theile
- Born: 29 July 1646
- Died: 24 June 1724 (aged 77); Hamburg
- Occupation: Composer

Johann Theile (29 July 1646 – 24 June 1724) was a German composer of the Baroque era, famous for the opera Adam und Eva, Der erschaffene, gefallene und aufgerichtete Mensch, first performed in Hamburg on 2 January 1678.

== Life ==
After studying law in Leipzig and Halle, Theile took instruction in composition in Weißenfels. His teacher there was Heinrich Schütz, the most prominent German composer of the 17th century. Theile is believed to have been one of his last pupils, and is considered one of the most gifted among them. Between 1673 and 1675 he held the position of Court Kapellmeister for Duke Christian Albrecht of Schleswig-Holstein-Gottorp. Some years later he held the position of Kapellmeister in Wolfenbüttel, where he commenced a musical apprenticeship to Johann Rosenmüller, who by this time had permanently returned to Northern Germany after having spent most of his career in Italy. He also worked in Naumburg, where he likewise held the position of Kapellmeister; Berlin, where he was active as a music teacher to the royal court; as well as Lübeck and Stettin, where he also served a music instructor. In 1673 he wrote his Matthäuspassion (St. Matthew Passion) in Lübeck.

In 1694, Theile returned from a stint as a musical advisor to the Duke of Zeitz to his home town of Naumburg, where he died in 1724.

Theile’s compositions encompass Singspiele, operas, masses, psalm settings, passion oratorios, arias, canzonettas, and sonatas, as well as motets. His sacred opera Adam und Eva was the first work to be performed at the Goosemarket Opera in Hamburg – the first civic opera house in Germany. He also wrote a number of works on music theory, particularly on counterpoint. He also had an outstanding career as a practitioner and theorist in musical pedagogy. Theile taught Johann Mattheson, Johann Adolph Hasse. Dietrich Buxtehude was his most important pupil (despite having been nine years older and having pre-deceased him by more than a decade).
