= Oper am Gänsemarkt =

Former theatre in Hamburg

Coordinates: 53°33′18″N 9°59′18″E

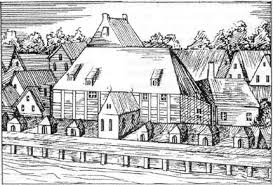
- Early 18th-century engraving of the opera house
- Interactive map of Oper am Gänsemarkt
- Address: Gänsemarkt square, Hamburg

Construction
- Opened: 2 January 1678
- Closed: 1750
- Demolished: 1756
- Architect: Girolamo Sartorio

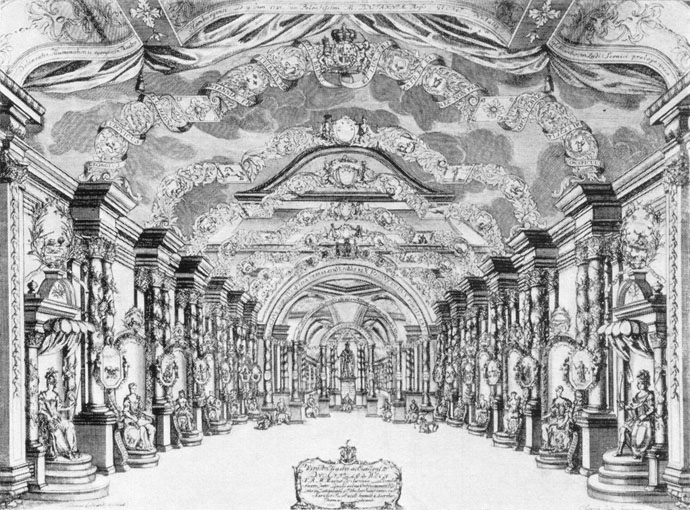
Decoration during a festival in honour of George I of Great Britain

The Oper am Gänsemarkt was a theatre in Hamburg, Germany, built in 1678 after plans of Girolamo Sartorio at the Gänsemarkt square. It was the first public opera house to be established in Germany: not a court opera, as in many other towns. Everybody could buy a ticket, like in Venice. Most works were in the German language or translated librettos (from Italian).

The building was torn down in 1756, but rebuilt in 1765.

== History ==
The founding of the Hamburg opera was an initiative of the well-traveled lawyer and alderman Gerhard Schott, who was impressed by Italian opera and Johann Adam Reincken, a local church organist. Johann Theile, Kapellmeister of Christian Albert, Duke of Holstein-Gottorp, who lived during the years 1675–1679 and 1684–1689 in exile in the city, organised its first performance. For the construction of the stage the Italian engineer and architect Girolamo Sartorio was attracted by the private company. Protests and accusations by some Hamburg ministers before and after the opening held on for several years, and is known as the first "Hamburger Theaterstreit".

The opening of the house took place on 2 January 1678 with Johann Theile's sacred opera Adam und Eva, succeeded by works of Nicolò Minato and Antonio Sartorio, Johann Wolfgang Franck with Cara Mustapha (1686), Agostino Steffani, Carlo Pallavicino and Johann Sigismund Kusser. Because of an argument with the management, Kusser organized an opera in the refectory of the local Dom.

In 1695 Reinhard Keiser took over the post of Kapellmeister until 1718; from 1703 to 1707 he also held the directorship. In 1703 Handel came from Halle to Hamburg as a cembalist and violin player, and a famous duel took place between Handel and Mattheson, during and after which Cleopatra was performed. One of the musicians was Christoph Graupner. In 1705 (?) Handel met with Gian Gastone de' Medici, who invited him to Pratolino.

Agostino Steffani, Johann Mattheson, Georg Friedrich Händel, Nicolaus Adam Strungk, Johann Philipp Förtsch, Georg Bronner, Johann Philipp Krieger, Georg Caspar Schürmann, and Johann Georg Conradi composed Singspiele or baroque opera's for the Hamburg opera. There were performances on two or three days a week, and around 90 performances a year. The opera season started in Winter; in Summer and on religious holidays the theatre was closed. Because of the long scene changes each performance took four to six hours and began by afternoon.

In 1722 Georg Philipp Telemann took over the management of the opera house, which he held until the end of 1738. From 1743 till 1750 the building was used by Angelo Mingotti, performing Italian opera's by Hasse and Pergolesi. Christoph Willibald Gluck performed his works in 1748. In 1750 the building was sold.

== Second house ==
Between 1767 and 1770 Gotthold Ephraim Lessing was the dramatist in what was called Deutsches Nationaltheater.

== Sources ==
- Wolff, H.C. (1957) Die Barockoper in Hamburg (1678–1738) Möseler Verlag. Wolfenbüttel.
- Die frühe deutsche Oper am Gänsemarkt
- Bereich Hamburger Gänsemarktoper
