= Bornemann =

Bornemann is a German surname. Notable people with the surname include:

- Christian Bornemann (born 1965), German Windsurfer
- Elsa Bornemann (1952–2013), recognized Argentine doctor of the Arts, polyglot and composer
- Ernest Bornemann (1915–1995), German writer, anthropologist, psychoanalyst and sexologist
- Frank Bornemann (born 1949), the guitarist for German progressive rock band Eloy
- Fritz Bornemann (1912–2007), German architect
- Hans Bornemann (1448–1474), late Gothic painter who was active in Hamburg
- Hinrik Bornemann (c. 1450–1499), Northern German Late Gothic painter
- Ole Bornemann Bull (physician) (1842–1916), Norwegian ophthalmologist
- Rebeccah Bornemann (born 1971 or 1972), Canadian para-swimmer

Media related to Bornemann (surname) at Wikimedia Commons
