= The Miraculous Draft of Fishes (Witz) =

1444 painting by Konrad Witz

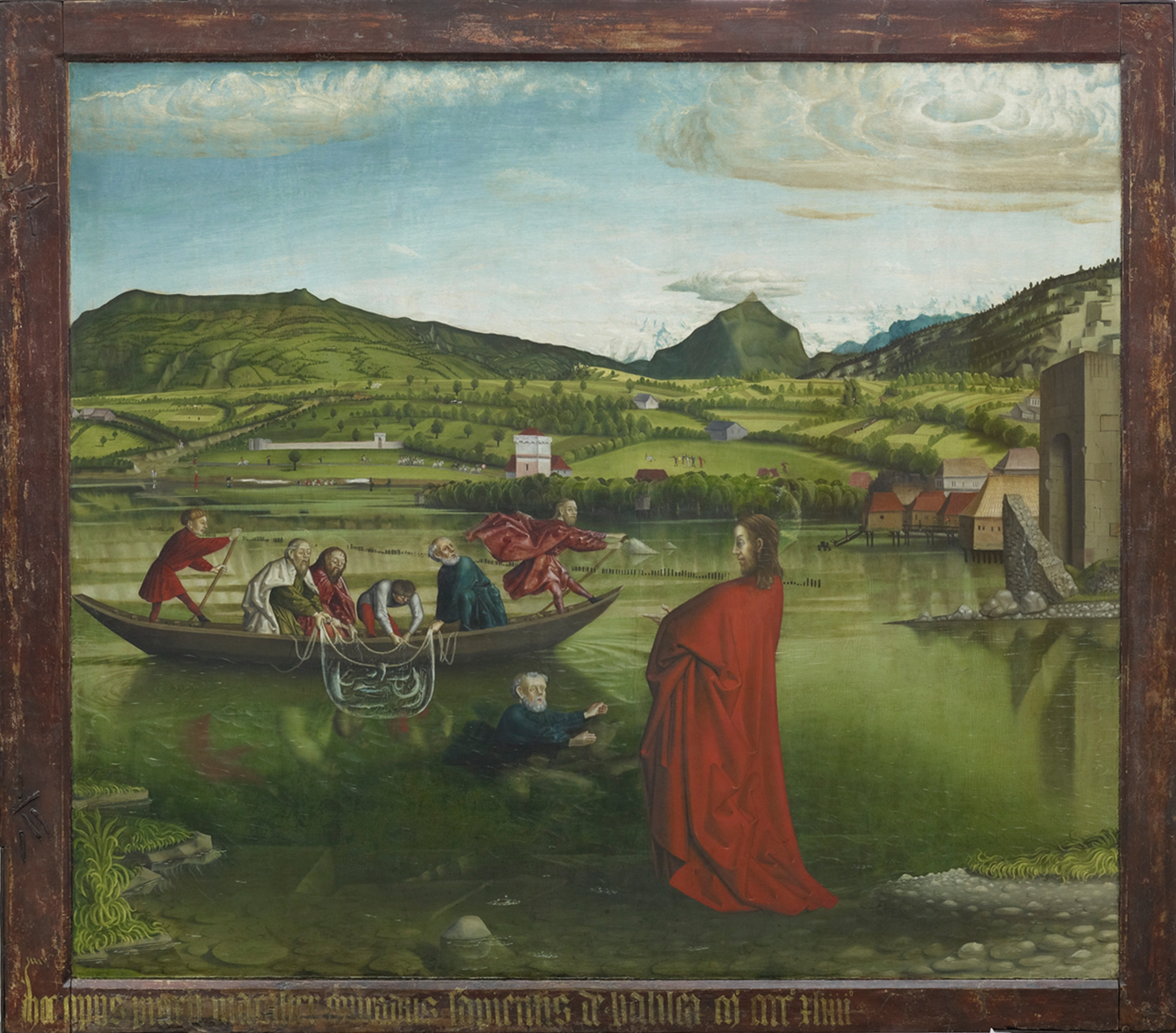
The Miraculous Draft of Fishes, 1444. 132cm x 154cm, Musée d'Art et d'Histoire, Geneva.

The Miraculous Draft of Fishes is a 1444 oil on wood panel painting by the Swabian artist Konrad Witz, on view in the Museum of Art and History (Musée d'Art et d'Histoire) in Geneva, Switzerland. Witz was the first artist to be recognized for incorporating large landscapes in paintings with large amounts of detail. The landscape has a panoramic view of Lake Geneva and was a significant accomplishment for Northern Renaissance Art.

Originally part of a now dismantled altarpiece known as Peter's Altar Table, the panel depicts the miraculous catch of 153 fish as reported in the Gospel of John and shows a scene of the disciples, who had been fishing at the edge of a lake, recognising the stranger who had called out to them from the shore as the resurrected Jesus. Peter is shown wading toward Jesus to greet him. In this painting Witz takes the revolutionary step of moving the scene from the biblical Sea of Galilee to his local area, around Lake Geneva. With this move, Witz was able to base his rendering of the far landscape on his own observation of actual topographical features rather than rely on imaginative interpretation as earlier artists did. He further brought the landscape to the fore of his work; here the range is not simply a footnote seen through a window or detail visible beyond a crucifixion scene. The painting is renowned for its naturalistic representation of the Graian Alps and the snow-capped peaks of Mont Blanc and Le Môle seen in the distance. In this regard the work is the earliest known faithful portrayal of a landscape in European art history.

Detailed landscapes had already been portrayed by Early Netherlandish painters such as Jan van Eyck, and their characteristic attention to surface textures and rendering the depth of the receding landscape held strong influence over Witz. These earlier works were neither based on actual geographical areas, however, nor upon the careful observation evident in this work. In its innovation, the panel is analogous to Hans Bornemann, at the time working in Lüneburg, who also adapted and greatly advanced the Netherlandish method when he began to paint, for the first time, cityscapes that gave a true account of all of the visible features, and not just the most important buildings.

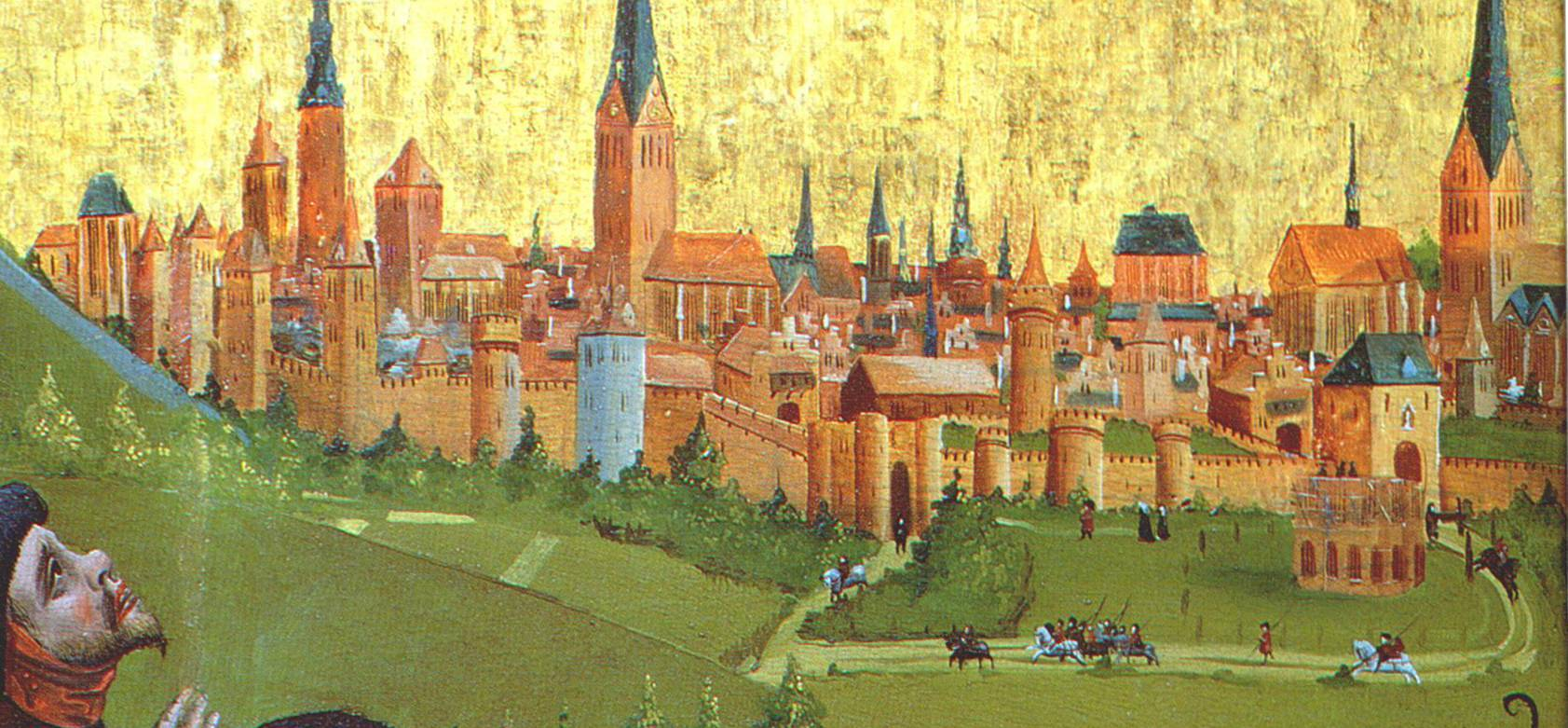
Hans Bornemann, Detail from the Heiligentaler Altar, c 1445

The painting can be seen as close study of the optics of reflection and the manner in which the form and appearance of objects is distorted reflected on water's surface. The buildings and rocks to the right are reflected, as are the coloured clothes of the men hauling a net in the small boat. In the foreground the water is so transparent the bed of the lake can be seen, while at the far end of the lake the tone of the water surface dissolves into a silvery expanse. Only the figure of Christ standing at the edge of the shore does not cast a reflection, the implication being that the laws of nature do not apply to the divine.

== Sources ==
- Borchert, Till-Holger. Van Eyck to Dürer: The Influence of Early Netherlandish Painting on European Art, 1430–1530. London: Thames & Hudson, 2011. ISBN 978-0-500-23883-7
