= St. Mary's Cathedral, Hamburg =

Hamburg Cathedral
- Cathedral of St. Mary's; Sankt Mariendom; Dom St. Marien zu Hamburg
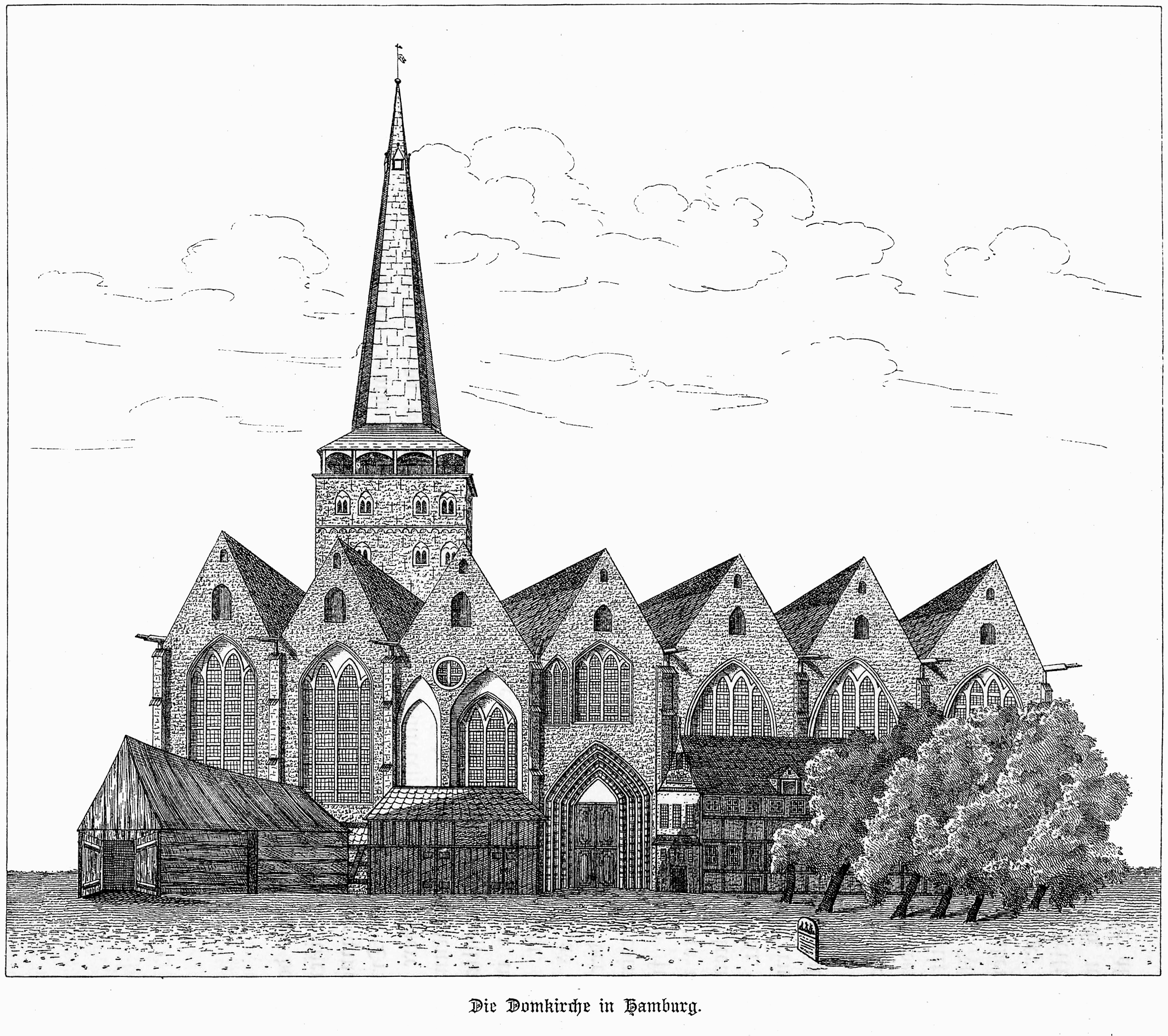
- St. Mary's Cathedral

- Location within Hamburg Hamburg Cathedral (Germany)
- 53°32′57″N 09°59′52″E
- Location: Hamburg; Old Town
- Country: Germany
- Denomination: Lutheran
- Previous denomination: Roman Catholic till 1531

History
- Status: Proto-cathedral
- Founded: 831
- Founder: Ansgar
- Dedication: Mary of Nazareth
- Consecrated: 18 June 1329

Architecture
- Functional status: Demolished
- Architectural type: 5-naved hall church
- Style: Brick Gothic
- Groundbreaking: 1035
- Closed: 1531–1540
- Demolished: 1804–1807

Specifications
- Materials: brick

Administration
- Province: Bremen
- Archdiocese: Bremen

Saint Mary's Cathedral in Hamburg (German: Sankt Mariendom, also Mariendom, or simply Dom or Domkirche, or Hamburger Dom) was the cathedral of the ancient Roman Catholic Archdiocese of Hamburg (not to be confused with Hamburg's modern Archdiocese, est. 1994), which was merged in personal union with the Diocese of Bremen in 847, and later in real union to form the Archdiocese of Hamburg-Bremen, as of 1027.

In 1180 the cathedral compound turned into the cathedral close (German: Domfreiheit; i.e. cathedral immunity district), forming an exclave of the Prince-Archbishopric of Bremen within the city of Hamburg. By the Reformation the concathedral was converted into a Lutheran church. The cathedral immunity district, since 1648 an exclave of the Duchy of Bremen, was seized by Hamburg in 1803. The city then prompted the demolition of the proto-cathedral between 1804 and 1807.

== Location ==
The cathedral, in common Italo-Nordic tradition simply called Dom (Italian: Duomo), which is the synecdoche, used – pars pro toto – for most existing or former collegiate churches and cathedrals in Germany alike. The cathedral was situated in the section of the earliest settlement of Hamburg on a geest hill between the rivers Alster and Elbe near Speersort street. Today's St. Peter's Church was erected right north of the Dom, today's Domstraße crosses through the former site of the cathedral. Curienstraße recalls the location of the canons' courts.

== History ==
The early history of the Hamburg See and its first cathedral buildings is somewhat obscured. In different struggles on competences and privileges plenty of documents have been completely forged or counterfeited or backdated, in order to corroborate arguments. "These forgeries have drawn a veil before the early history of the [archbishopric of] Hamburg-Bremen." Results of archeological excavations could not clarify the succession of early cathedral buildings before 1035.

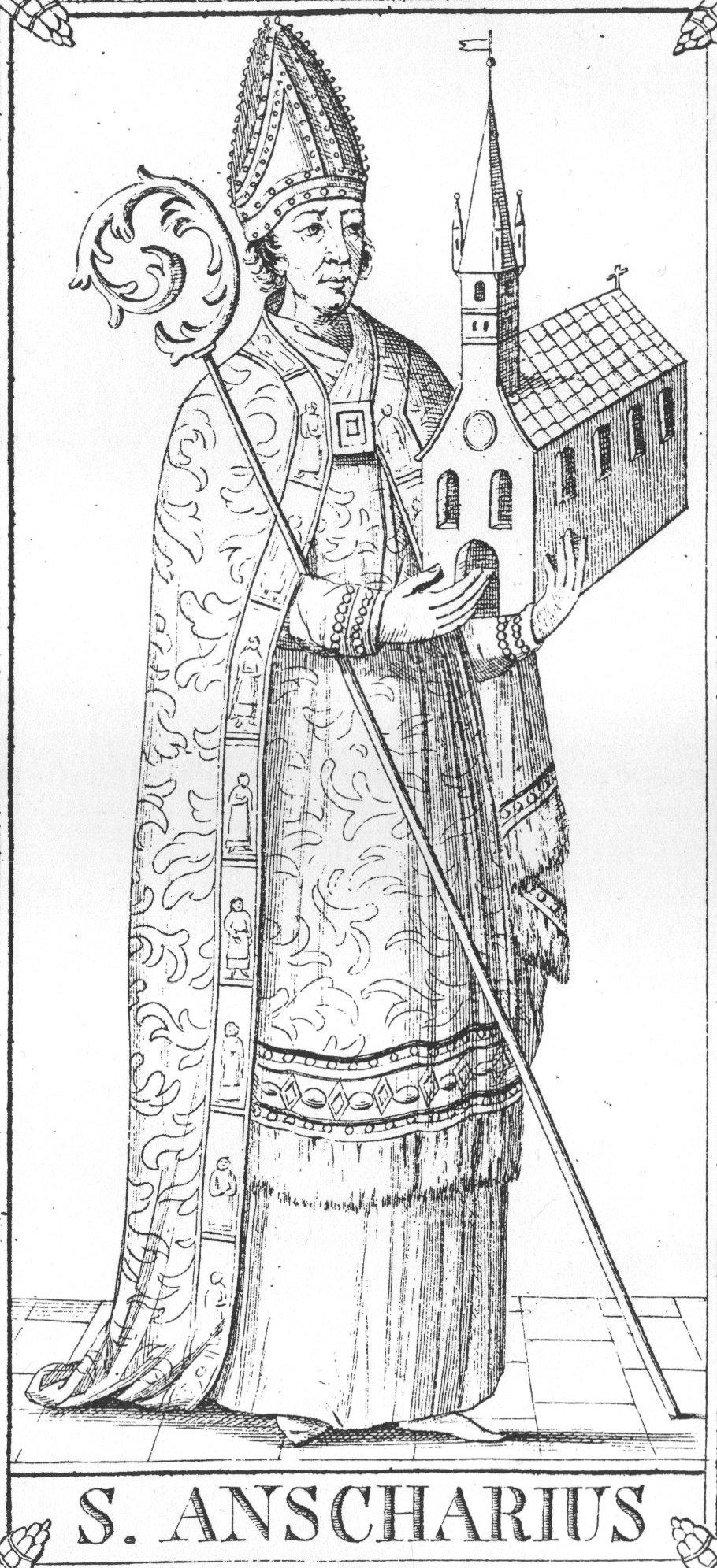
Ansgar, founder of St. Mary's, copy of a depiction, originally hung in the cathedral, now in St. Peter's.

A wooden mission church is reported for 831. Pope Gregory IV appointed the Benedictine monk Ansgar as first archbishop as of 834. After the looting of Hamburg and the destruction of the church by Vikings under Horik I in 845 the archdiocese was united with the Diocese of Bremen in 847. Hamburg remained the archiepiscopal seat.

The deposed Pope Benedict V was carried off to Hamburg in 964 and placed under the care of Archbishop Adaldag. He became a deacon then but died in 965 or 966 and was buried in the cathedral. In 983 Prince Mstivoj of the Obodrites destroyed city and church. In 988 Benedict's remains were presumably transferred to Rome. Archbishop Unwan started reconstructing a fortified cathedral. Under Archbishop Adalbert of Hamburg (1043–1072) Hamburg-Bremen attained its greatest prosperity and later had its deepest troubles. Adalbert was after Hamburg-Bremen's upgrade to the rank of a Patriarchate of the North and failed completely. Hamburg was even dropped as part of the diocesan name.

With the investiture of Archbishop Liemar the seat definitely moved to Bremen. However, the cathedral chapter of Hamburg persisted with several special rights. Around 1035 Archbishop Adalbrand of Bremen prompted the construction of a first cathedral from brick and his castle. In the same century St. Peter's Parish Church was established north of the cathedral compound.

However, starting in 1245 Adalbrand's structure was replaced by a new early Gothic three-naved hall church erected by chapter and Prince-Archbishop Gebhard of Lippe, one of the few incumbents of the united see looking for a balanced performance in Bremen and Hamburg, preferring the title Bishop of Hamburg when staying in the diocesan territory right of the Elbe, as is known from seals and documents. Prince-Archbishop Burchard Grelle consecrated the church as archdiocesan co-cathedral on 18 June 1329.

By the end of the 14th century the concathedral was extended by two more naves. After this, the concathedral remained mostly unchanged until its demolition by 1807. The tower was completed in 1443. In the early 16th century an additional hall, first mentioned as the Nige Gebuwte (Low Saxon for new building) in 1520, was erected closing the adjacent cloister towards the north. This hall was presumably used for sermons, the actual cathedral for masses. The hall was later colloquially called Schappendom after the cupboards (Low Saxon: Schapp[en] [pl.]), which carpenters of Hamburg exhibited there. The traditional fayre at Christmas, recorded for the square in front of the cathedral since the 14th century, and continued as today's funfayre Hamburger Dom (literally in Hamburg Cathedral), then used to take place within the Schappendom hall.

Starting in 1522 Lutheranism spread among the burghers of Hamburg, gaining their vast majority by 1526, while most canons of the cathedral chapter rather clung to Catholicism, enjoying their extraterritorial status. Hamburg's Senate (city government) accounted for the new facts and adopted the new denomination in 1528. So when in October 1529, the senate – wielding its advowson – appointed Johannes Aepinus (d. 1553) as Lutheran pastor at the neighbouring St. Peter's Church, in order to introduce Johannes Bugenhagen's Lutheran Church Order in the city, Aepinus contested with the prevailingly Catholic cathedral chapter.

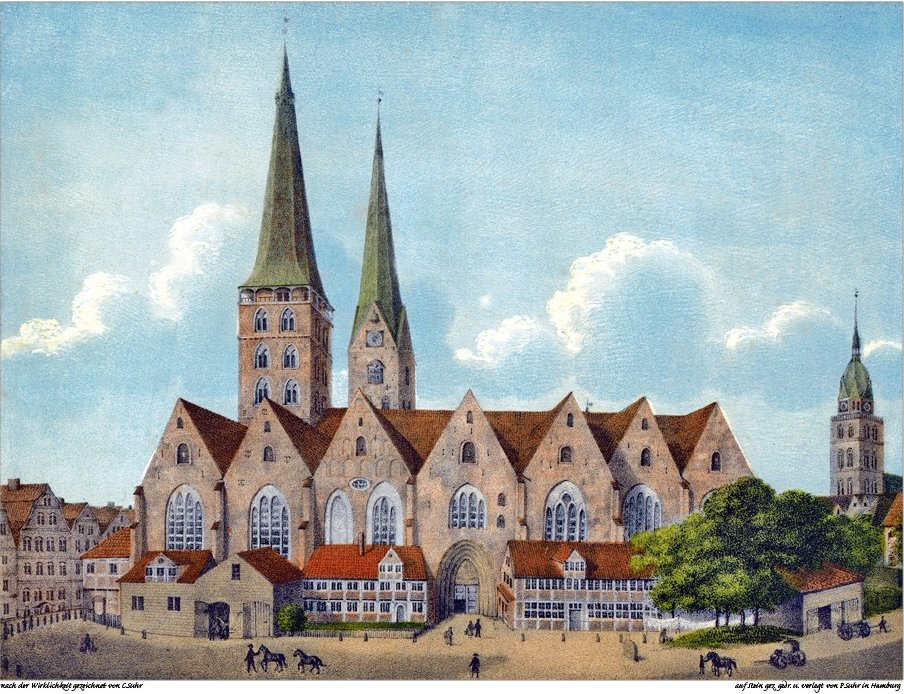
St. Mary's Cathedral in 1800, seen from south against the towers of St. Peter (centre) and St. James (right).

The extraterritorial status and the denominational opposition strengthened the perception of cathedral, chapter, and immunity district as alien element within the city. While almost all inhabitants outside the immunity district had become parishioners of the now Lutheran parish churches, the huge cathedral lacked a congregation. Between the Feast of the Assumption of Mary and December 1529 the city's militia barred churchgoers from access to the cathedral, given up after imperial protests. Furthermore, the capitular estates in Hamburg and spread all over the North Elbian diocesan area, forming the endowment to maintain canons and cathedral, were increasingly withheld by the respective territorial rulers. Thus in May 1531 the chapter closed the cathedral and its maintenance was neglected.

Meanwhile, the majority of the capitular canons had adopted Lutheranism and elected fellow faithful to eventual vacancies. The cathedral reopened as Lutheran place of worship in 1540. The disputes on capitular estates were regulated by the Bremen Settlement in 1561. The church turned into a Lutheran proto-cathedral and the remaining endowment allowed financing excellent ecclesiastical music, making the proto-cathedral a frequented venue for Lutheran services accompanied by music. The incumbents of the Bremen See used to be themselves Lutherans since the accession of Administrator Henry of Saxe-Lauenburg in 1569. The Peace of Westphalia in 1648 transformed the Prince-Archbishopric of Bremen, an elective monarchy, into the hereditary monarchy of the Duchy of Bremen, in personal union with Sweden until 1712/15, since 1715 with the House of Hanover. Thus the immunity district turned into a ducal Bremian enclave in the city.

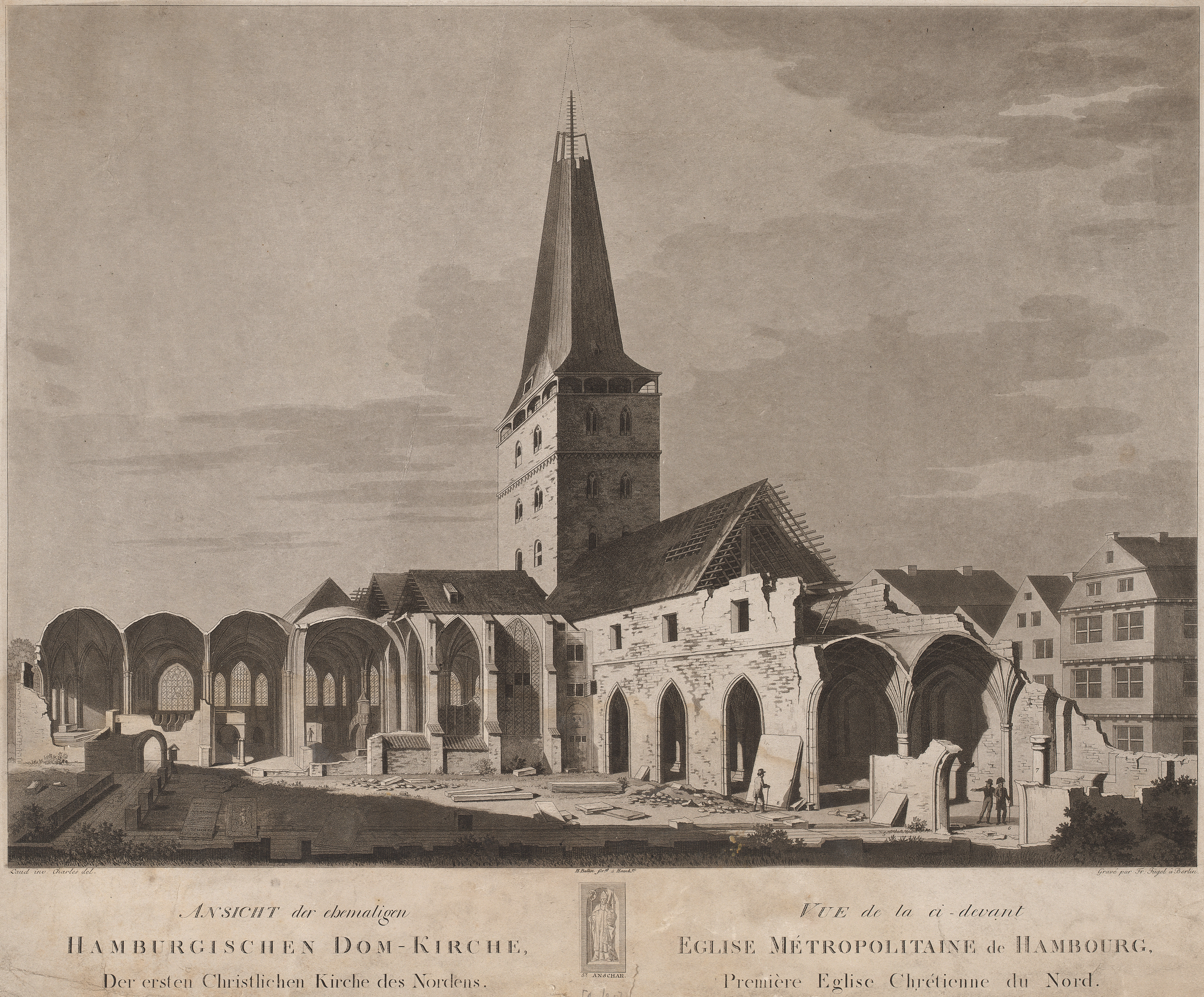
Hamburg Cathedral, seen from east, during demolition in 1806

The architect Ernst Georg Sonnin carried out maintenance works in 1759/1760. Due to the weak, unstable subsoil the cathedral tower was leaning, so Sonnin straightened the tower, as he had done with other church towers in Hamburg, he even demonstrated the gathered public his new technique by reversing it to leaning and again straightening it. Since 1772 the city of Hamburg considered to buy the immunity district, however, not effectuating any changes by then. On the instigation of the ducal Bremian government the cathedral chapter sold its valuable library by the end of the 18th century. Since 1790 the pastorate of the proto-cathedral remained vacant.

By the Reichsdeputationshauptschluss in 1803, the Duchy of Bremen ceded its cathedral immunity districts in Bremen and Hamburg (Domfreiheit), to these free imperial cities. With the neglect of the proto-cathedral by the ducal government it had dropped out of Hamburg's cultural life again. Hamburg's Senate, then holding the ius patronatus to all other Lutheran parish churches had no usage for an additional church, which did not even have the parishioners to maintain it. So in 1802, the Senate, always upholding the city's vital mercantile interests, ordered Hamburg's Gothic proto-cathedral to be pulled down, a decision which aroused no serious opposition within the city and which was carried out between 1804 and 1807.

The stones were sold off or used to reinforce the sea defenses along the Elbe; the funerary sculptures and monuments were broken up and used in the reconstruction of the city's rudimentary sewage system. The Senate was partly motivated by the desire to rid the city of an extraterritorial institution, but it is more than possible that the rise in rents and the high demand for housing at the time also played a role. In any case, the incident was typical of the celebrated Philistinism of the Hamburg authorities. Five more medieval churches in the city were pulled down between 1807 and 1837.

== Legacy ==
=== Rescued furnishings ===
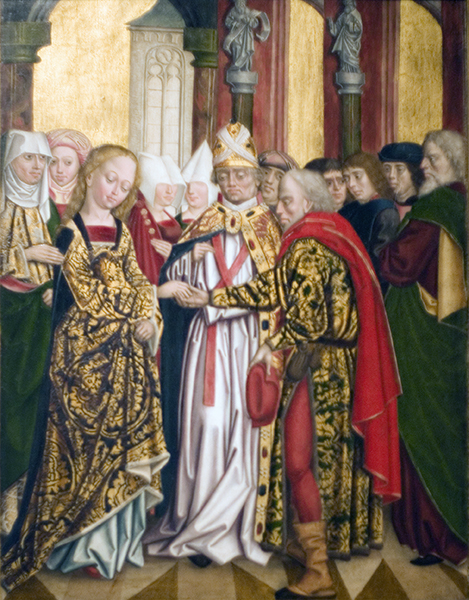
Hamburg Altar: Main cathedral altar consecrated to Mary of Nazareth, a panel depicting Mary and Joseph of Nazareth, National Museum, Warsaw.

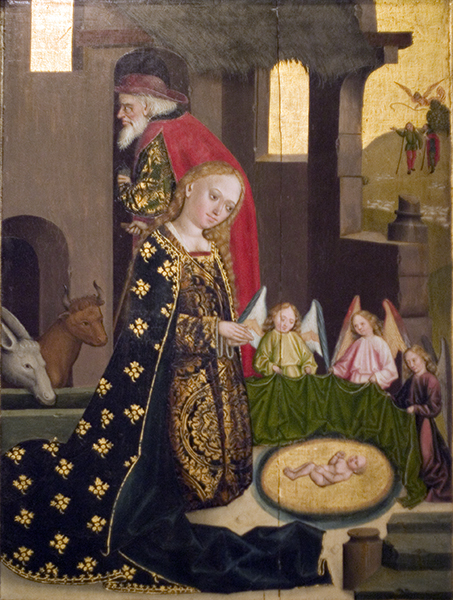
Hamburg Altar: Panel depicting the Nativity of Jesus, National Museum, Warsaw.

There was little interest in the valuable furnishings of the proto-cathedral. Few enthusiasts with interest in the history of art did not prevail as to rescuing the building. In order to make the biggest salvage value, not only the structures above earth were demolished and sold as construction material but even the grave slabs and most of the foundations were dug out to be sold as well. The more than 370 slabs of sandstone were built into hydraulic structures along the many waterways in Hamburg; broken stones and rubble were also used for dikes in Ochsenwerder and Spadenland. Therefore, archeological excavations in recent years could not uncover enough foundation to determine the exact groundplan.

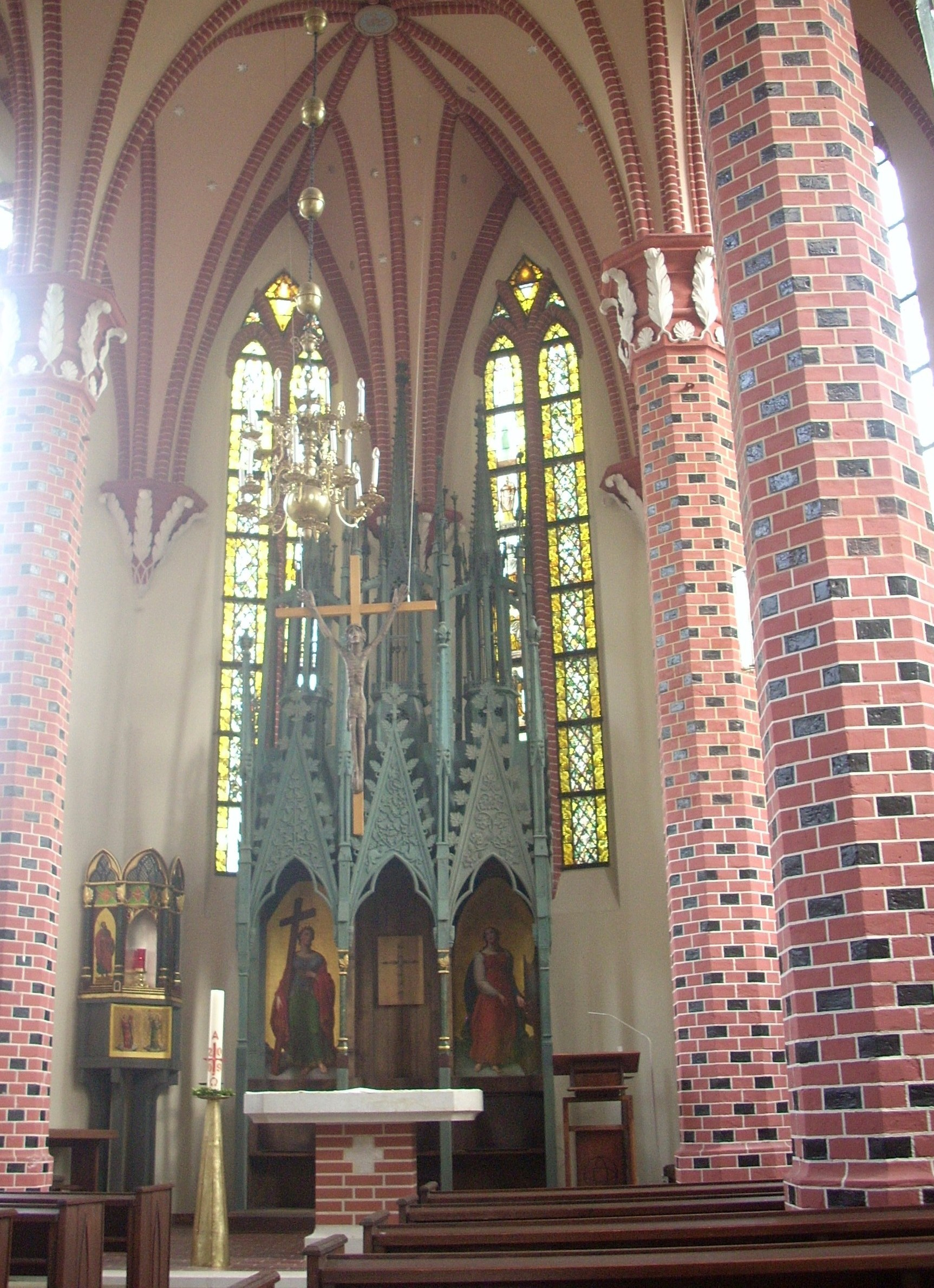
Glass windows of the cathedral, built in Ss. Helena and Andrew Church in Ludwigslust.

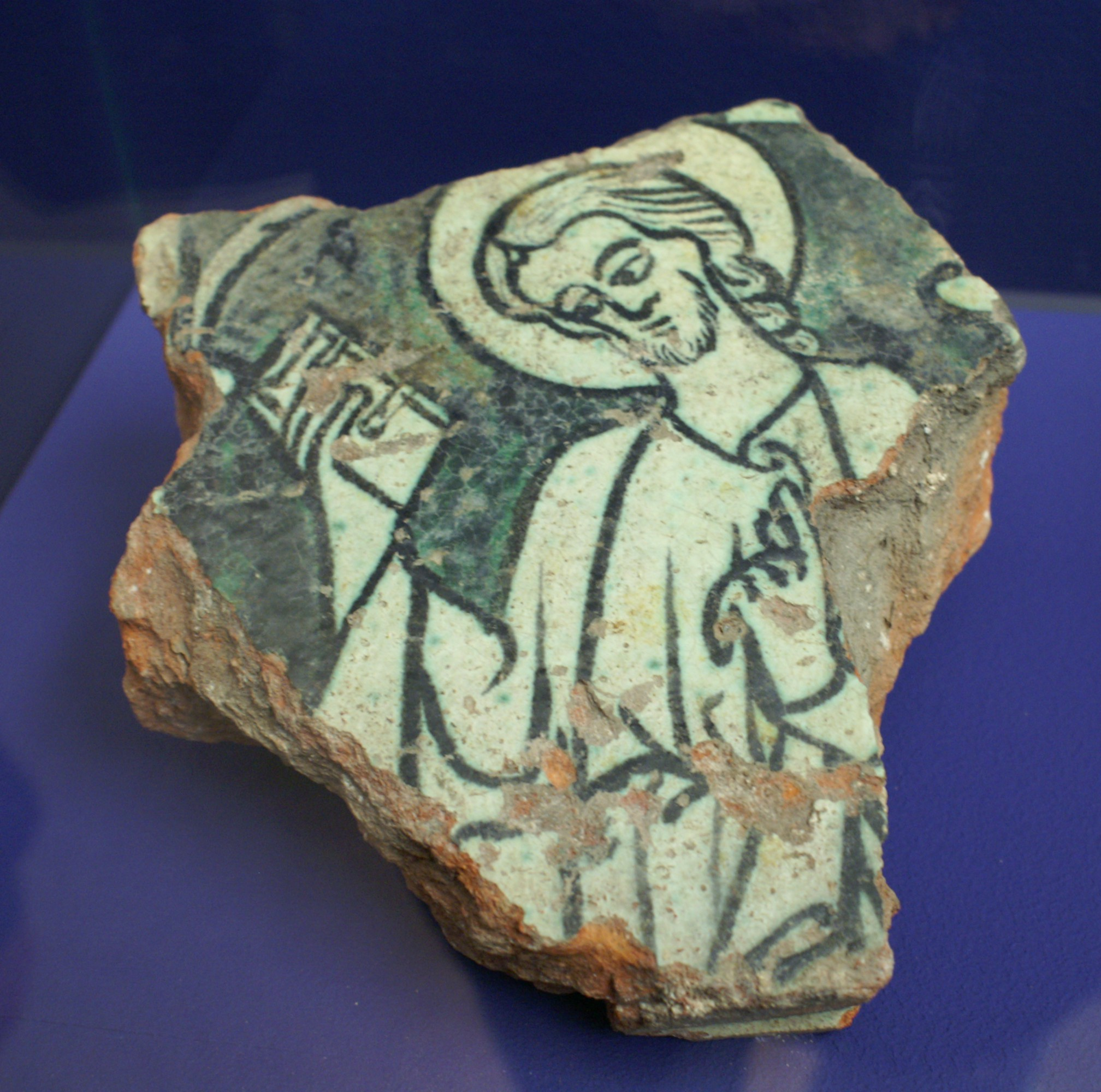
Sherd of Pope Benedict V's cenotaph, Hamburgmuseum.

The rescue of some furnishings we owe to Philipp Otto Runge prevailing in the merchant republic of Hamburg with the argument, that they could be sold as well. So the Late Gothic cathedral altarpiece, which was created by Hamburg's famous artists Absolon Stumme and his stepson Hinrik Bornemann and only finished after their deaths in 1499 by Wilm Dedeke, was rescued and sold to East Prussia. In 1946, the altarpiece was nationalized and is now shown in the National Museum, Warsaw.

The congregation of Hamburg's St. James the Greater Church acquired the St. Luke Altar from the proto-cathedral and it now installed in the second southern nave of St. James. Several 15th-century stained glass windows showing the apostles were sold to the Catholic congregation of Ludwigslust and are now built in the quire of Ss. Helena and Andrew Church, erected 1803–1809.

One of the cathedral bells survived. The Celsa, founded by the bell founder Gerhard van Wou in his workshop on Glockengießerwall in 1487, was bought in 1804 by the Lutheran congregation of St. Nicholas Church in Altengamme, now a part of Hamburg.

Remnants of Pope Benedict V's cenotaph, which was erected around 1330, but removed in 1782, have been found, besides other findings, in the excavation campaigns (1947–1957, 1980–1987 and 2005–2007).

=== Hamburger Dom ===
A fair held in or in front of the cathedral was first recorded in 1329, at the beginning only at special feasts like Christmas, thus being one of the predecessors of today's Christmas markets. With the Reformation in the 16th century the fair was also held on other occasions. After the demolition of the cathedral (1804–1807), the fair, still named Hamburger Dom (literally in English: Hamburg Cathedral) moved to Gänsemarkt square (geese market) in 1804, and takes place on Heiligengeistfeld since 1892.

=== The cathedral site after its demolition ===
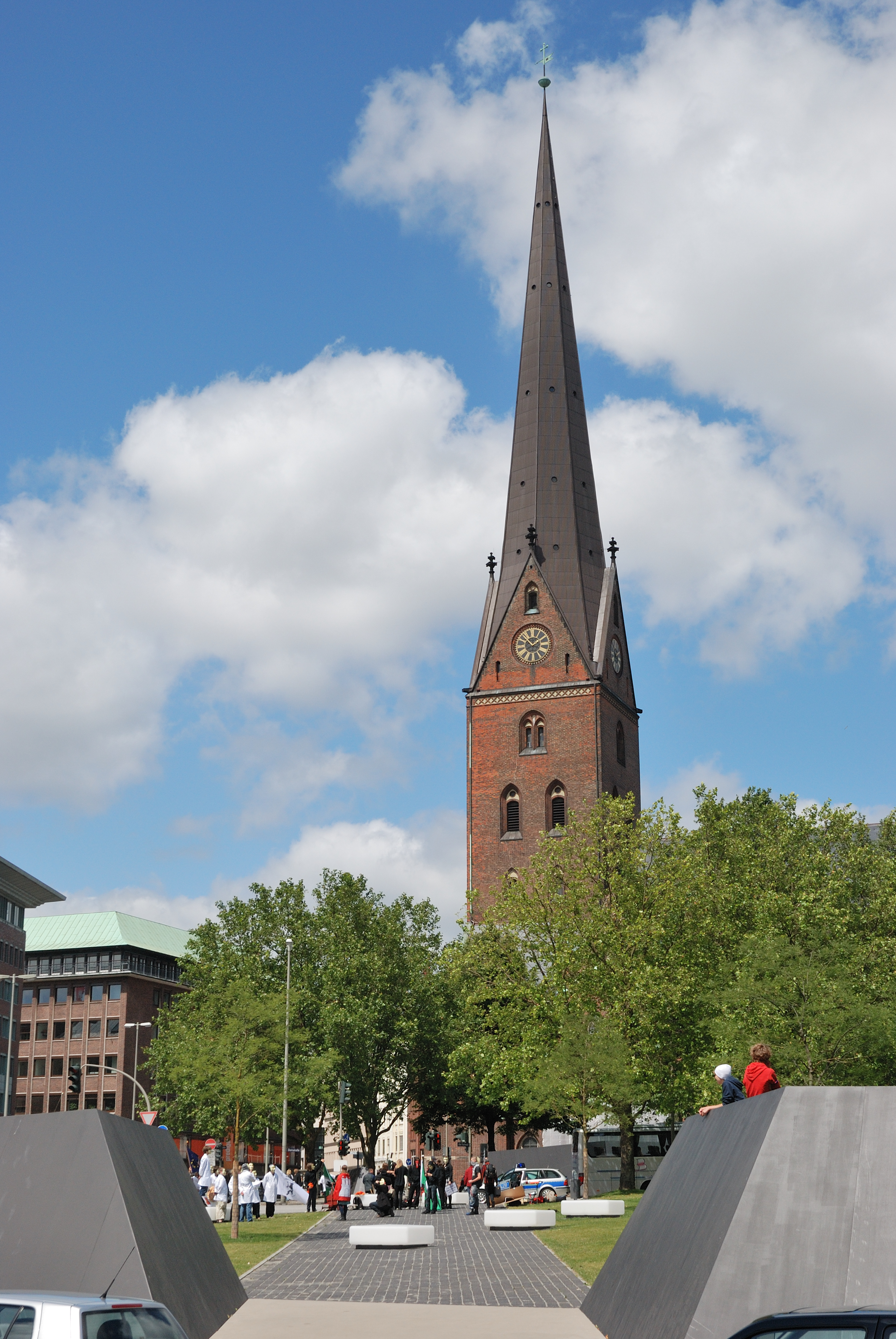
Former cathedral site with the archeological park and the steel imitations of the walls of the presumable original fortified church, St. Peter's in the background.

After its demolition the cathedral site remained empty until Carl Ludwig Wimmel and Franz Gustav Forsmann erected a new building between 1838 and 1840 for Hamburg's most renowned Gymnasium, the Gelehrtenschule des Johanneums. This building was later given to Hamburg's State and University Library, but destroyed in the Allied Bombing Operation Gomorrah in summer 1943. Since the rubble was cleared in 1955 the site remained again empty, crossed by a new thoroughfare named Domstraße (Cathedral Street).

A recent project to rebuild the site with a modern glass steel complex has been dropped after civic protest in 2007. Since 2009 an archeological park covers the site. Steel elements indicate the former walls of the early fortified church supposed to have been the original form of the archiepiscopal see. 39 white benches indicate the likely locations of the former columns of the 5-naved main hall. A single, remaining foundation of one of the columns can be seen through a glass screen.

=== Modern Hamburg Cathedral ===
In 1994 a new Roman Catholic Archdiocese of Hamburg was founded. On this occasion the 1893-erected Catholic St. Mary's Church in Sankt Georg neighbourhood became the New St. Mary's Cathedral.

== Notable people active at the Dom ==
=== Archbishops, prince-archbishops and administrators ===
The incumbents of the Hamburg-Bremen See were usually titled Archbishop of Hamburg and Bishop of Bremen between 848 and 1072, thereafter Hamburg was mostly dropped as titular element, however, some later archbishops continued the tradition of naming both dioceses until 1258. The Lutheran incumbents holding the see since 1569, were officially titled Administrators, but, nevertheless, colloquially referred to as prince-archbishops.

=== Chapter and canonry ===
The cathedral chapter was founded in 834 and its members, the canons (Domherr[en]) enjoyed personal immunity from jurisdiction of the secular local rulers. The chapter wielded the ecclesiastical jurisdiction in the North Elbian part of the archdiocese, to wit Hamburg, Ditmarsh, Holstein, and Stormarn. Thus until the breakthrough of the Reformation the chapter appointed the priests serving in the city's parishes. Cathedral, chapter and canonry were maintained by numerous prebends comprising urban real estate and feudal dues and soccage collected from dependent farmers in many so-called capitular villages in the afore-mentioned areas. Holsatian aristocracy and Hamburg's patriciate provided for most of the canons.

At Archbishop Adalgar's (888–909) instigation Pope Sergius III confirmed the amalgamation of the Diocese of Bremen with the Archdiocese of Hamburg to form the Archdiocese of Hamburg and Bremen, colloquially called Hamburg-Bremen, and by so doing he denied Cologne's claim as metropolis over Bremen. Sergius prohibited Hamburg's Chapter to found suffragan dioceses of its own. After the Obodrite destruction of Hamburg in 983 the chapter was dispersed. So Archbishop Unwan appointed a new chapter with twelve canons, with three each taken from Bremen Cathedral chapter, and the three colleges of Bücken, Harsefeld and Ramelsloh. In 1139 Archbishop Adalbero had fled the invasion of Rudolph II, Count of Stade and Frederick II, Count Palatine of Saxony, who destroyed Bremen, and established in Hamburg also appointing new capitular canons by 1140.

With the archdiocese gaining princely sovereignty as an imperial estate of the Holy Roman Empire in 1180, the compounds of the Hamburg and Bremen cathedrals with chapterhouses and capitular residential courts (German: Curien) turned into Cathedral Immunity Districts (German: Domfreiheiten), forming exclaves of the Prince-Archbishopric of Bremen of imperial immediacy. After the Bremen Cathedral chapter, overlooking the three enfranchised Hamburg capitulars, had elected Valdemar of Denmark archbishop in 1207, Bremen's cathedral dean Burchard of Stumpenhusen, who had opposed this election, fled to Hamburg, then under Danish influence. King Valdemar II of Denmark, in enmity with his father's cousin Archbishop Valdemar, gained the Hamburg chapter to elect Burchard as anti-archbishop in early 1208. Lacking papal support King Valdemar II himself invested him as Archbishop Burchard I, however, only accepted in North Elbia.

In 1219 the Bremen Chapter again ignored the Hamburg capitulars, fearing their Danish partisanship and elected Gebhard of Lippe archbishop. In 1223 Archbishop Gebhard reconciled the Hamburg chapter and stipulated that three of its capitulars were enfranchised to elect with the Bremen chapter, to wit the provost, presiding the chapter, the dean (Domdechant) and the magister scholarum, in charge of the education at the cathedral school. Pope Honorius III confirmed this settlement in 1224, also affirming the continued existence of both chapters.

Canons were distinguished as younger (canonicus minor) and older (canonicus maior) office holders. The distinction was also evidenced by lower and higher prebends. Johann Rode the Elder served as provost between 1457 and 1460. The known historian Albert Krantz, also serving the city of Hamburg as diplomat, gained a canonicate of the lector primarius in 1493. In 1508 he advanced to Cathedral Dean (Domdechant) of the chapter. Krantz applied himself with zeal to the reform of ecclesiastical abuses, but, though opposed to various corruptions connected with Catholic church discipline, he had little sympathy with the drastic measures of John Wycliffe or Jan Hus. Krantz generally agreed with Martin Luther's protest against the abuse of indulgences, but refused Luther's theses on his deathbed in December 1517.

One canonicate, called magister scholarum, was in charge of the education at the cathedral school. 1499 Heinrich Banzkow served as magister scholarum, Johannes Saxonius was appointed magister scholarum in 1550. After the breakthrough of the Reformation canonicates were not necessarily bound to ecclesiastical offices any more, but often served to maintain educators, musicians or scientists.

In 1513 the Ditmarsians founded a Franciscan Friary in Lunden to thank their then national saint patron Mary of Nazareth, fulfilling a vow taken before the Battle of Hemmingstedt in case they could defeat the Dano-Holsatian invaders, however, the Hamburg chapter demanded its say in appointing the prebendaries. After years of dispute, the Council of the 48, the elected governing body of the farmers' republic of Ditmarsh, decided to found a Gallicanist kind of independent Catholic Church of Ditmarsh in August 1523, denying Hamburg's capitular jurisdiction in all of Ditmarsh. The chapter could not regain the jurisdiction, including its share in ecclesiastical fees and fines levied in Ditmarsh.

On request of the Senate of Hamburg Luther had sent Bugenhagen to the city. He developed the Lutheran Church Order for Hamburg in 1529. He first aimed at seizing the revenues of concathedral and chapter in favour of the common chest of the urban parishes, financing pastors and teachers. The chapter would be dissolved and the released canons paid a life annuity. However, the then still steadfastly Catholic capitulars refused and were not to be forced due to their immunity and extraterritorial status.

The dispute made many canons leave the city and shut down the concathedral. A lawsuit in the matter was still pendent at the Imperial Chamber Court when after the Smalkaldic War and the subsequent Peace of Augsburg Emperor Ferdinand I brokered the Bremen Settlement in 1561.

Two prebends, privately donated in the 15th century, were reserved for lectors (lector primarius, secundarius) in charge of the advanced theological training of the clergy. After the Reformation the lector primarius was combined with the superintendency of the Lutheran Church of Hamburg, first held by Superintendent Aepinus since 18 May 1532. The lector secundarius was combined with the Lutheran pastorate at the Dom. Smaller prebends were reserved to maintain church musicians and teachers. Known pastors were, among others, Johannes Freder (1540–1547), Paul von Eitzen (as of 1548), and Johann Heinrich Daniel Moldenhawer (1765–1790).

With the Peace of Westphalia the Prince-Archbishopric of Bremen had turned from an elective monarchy into the hereditary monarchy of the Duchy of Bremen. While the cathedral chapters of Bremen and Hamburg were not dissolved as such, they sharply lost influence because they used to be the election bodies of the incumbents of the see securing their privileges and endowments by election capitulations, which the incumbents had to issue as self-commitments to the laws and principles established until their accession. Hereditary monarchy opened the gate for absolutism in the Duchy of Bremen. The chapters turned from constitutive legislative bodies into subordinate administrative units receiving orders from the rulers. The last canon officiating as president of the chapter was the jurist Friedrich Johann Lorenz Meyer.

=== Church musicians ===
Many church musicians were granted prebends or canonicates, traditionally one canon, titled cantor or precentor, was in charge of preparing and organising musical performances in the Dom. Since the Reformation the Senate of Hamburg furthered the cantorate of the Johanneum surpassing the church music of the Dom. At times both cantorates were held in personal union.

Erasmus Sartorius, vicar at the Dom since 1604, was entrusted the cantorate of Johanneum in 1628. Cathedral cantor Thomas Selle officiated between 1642 and 1663. Johann Wolfgang Franck held the cantorate from 1682 to 1685. Friedrich Nicolaus Bruhns, succeeding Nicolaus Adam Strungk in charge of the Hamburger Ratsmusik (Music for the Hamburg Senate) in 1682, became canonicus minor and cathedral cantor in 1687.

Johann Mattheson, diplomat, musician, music theoretician, and cathedral cantor between 1715 and 1728 was the first author to publish on Johann Sebastian Bach. Deafness forced Mattheson to retire. He was succeeded by Reinhard Keiser, who became the cathedral precentor in 1728, and wrote largely church music there until his death in 1739. Between 1756 and 1762 Johann Valentin Görner served as cantor.

== Capitular endowment ==
The capitular endowment comprised 14 so-called capitular villages (Kapitelsdörfer) outside of then Hamburg, paying dues to the chapter. Following the Reformation the rulers of Holstein seized these villages, legitimised by the Peace of Westphalia in 1648. On 18 October 1576 Adolf, Duke of Holstein-Gottorp seized a number of capitular endowments against a recurrent annuity paid until 1803. Endowments:

- The tithe of Ahrensfelde since 1195
- The tithe of Bargfeld since 1195
- Half a hide in Barmbek
- Barmstedt till 1564
- Barsbüttel, grain dues from the village since 1306, all the village since 7 April 1341, till 1576
- Bergstedt since 1345
- Part of Bramfeld since 1271
- The tithe of Duvenstedt since 1255
- Hoisdorf since 1339, till 1576
- Half the tithe of Kirchsteinbek since 1255
- The tithe of Klein Borstel still in 1540
- Meiendorf since 1318
- Two oxgangs in Mellingstedt since 1271
- Domherrenland (canons' land) in Moorburg, till 1803
- An estate in Niendorf since 1343
- Osdorf since the early 14th century
- Half the tithe of Oststeinbek since 1255, the local mill since 1313, till 1576
- Papendorf in Holstein, held by the chapter between 1256 and 1556
- Seven oxgangs and three cottages in Poppenbüttel since 1336, all the village since 1389
- Dues from Rahlstedt since 1296
- Rellingen till 1564
- The tithe of Rissen since 1255
- Stemwarde part of its forest in 1259, all the village since 22 June 1263, till 1576
- A recurrent rent from Stockelsdorf manor since 1358
- Todendorf since 1263
- Willinghusen half the village since 1238, all the village since 1342, till 1576
- Wulfsdorf
- Wulksfelde
