= Tree of Jesse (Victor) =

Painting by Victor (iconographer)

- Ρίζα του Ιεσσαί (Greek), Albero di Jesse (Italian)
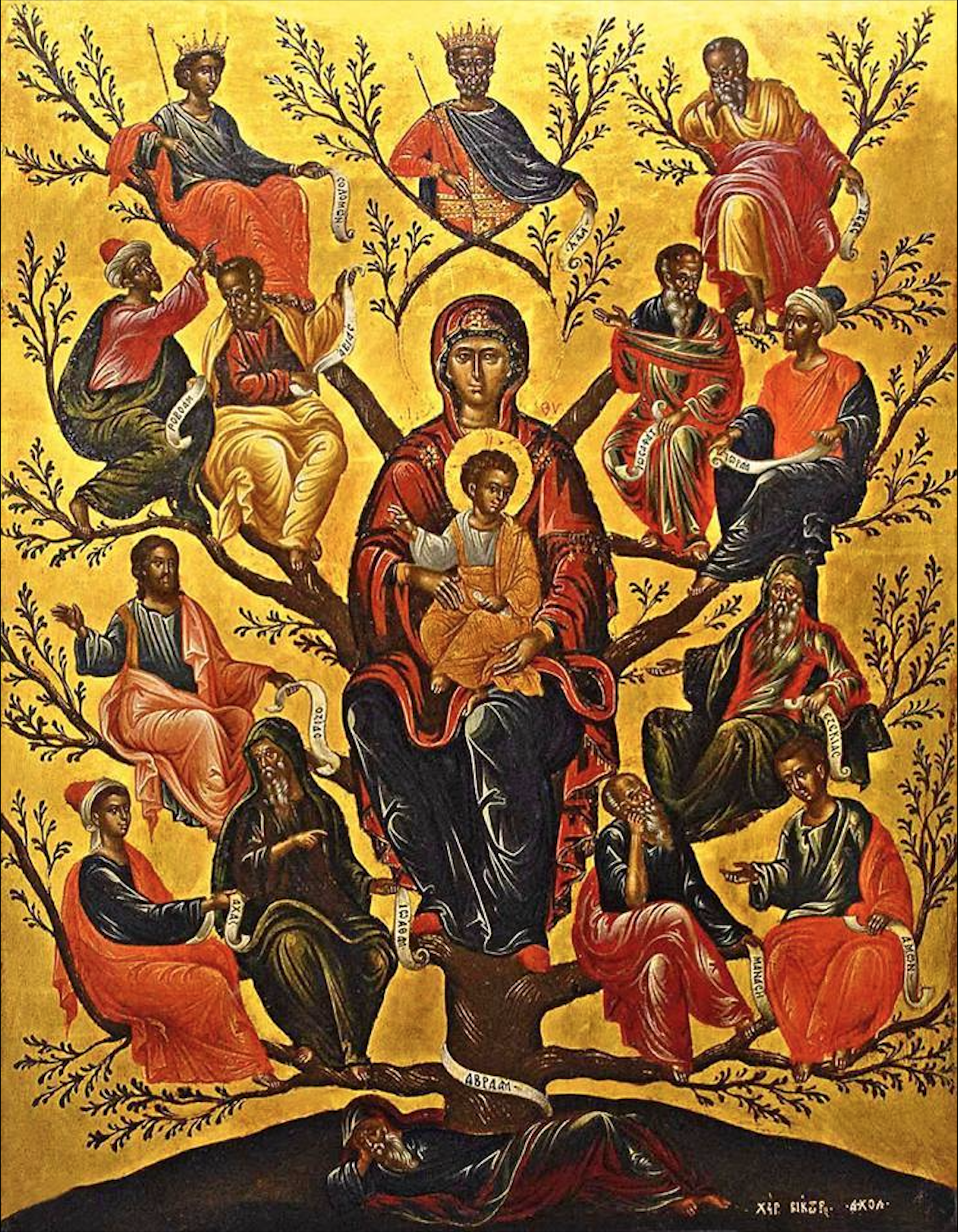
- Artist: Victor
- Year: 1674
- Medium: tempera on wood
- Subject: Tree of Jesse
- Dimensions: 51.8 cm × 40.3 cm (20.4 in × 15.9 in)
- Location: Hellenic Institute, Venice, Italy
- Owner: Hellenic Institute
- Accession: AMI 58

Tree of Jesse is an egg tempera painting by Victor. Victor was a Cretan painter active during the Late Cretan School from 1650 to 1697. He traveled all over the Venetian empire and eventually settled in Zakinthos. He represents the Late Cretan School and the early Heptanese School of painting. The painter features an enormous amount of existing works. His catalog of art exceeds over ninety-five paintings. He painted several versions of the Tree of Jesse and Christ the Vine.

Jesse of Bethlehem was the father of King David. The Tree of Jesse is the original use of the family tree as a schematic representation of genealogy and originated in a passage from the biblical Book of Isaiah. The book describes the descent of the Messiah (Mashiach) and the tree is the depiction in art of the ancestors of Jesus Christ. According to Luke's Gospel, chapter 3, Jesus is traced back, via Nathan to David and then on to "Adam, which was [the son] of God.". (Luke 3:23–38) Matthew's Gospel also says: "The book of the generation of Jesus Christ, the son of David, the son of Abraham." (Matthew 1:1).

The Tree of Jesse (Ρίζα του Ιεσσαί) has appeared numerous times in Greek Italian Byzantine art and it depicts the ancestral Davidic line of Jesus Christ. One of the earliest known sculpted versions of the Tree of Jesse was completed by Italian sculptor Lorenzo Maitani in the 14th century for Orvieto Cathedral Umbria, Italy. Several illuminated manuscripts from the 12th century also feature the Tree of Jesse. Northern European painters adopted the theme in the 15th century German painter Absolon Stumme completed his work entitled Tree of Jesse in 1499 and Dutch painter Jan Mostaert finished his work Tree of Jesse in 1500. Both works feature Abraham as the root of the tree. Cretan painters began to adopt the theme, Theophanes the Cretan finished his Tree of Jesse for the Agia Trapeza in the middle of the 1500s for the Monastery of Great Lavra in Mount Athos and by the 1600s dozens of Cretan painters began to depict the Tree of Jesse. Theodore Poulakis completed his version of the Tree of Jesse in 1666 and Victor completed his work eight years afterward. That same year in 1674 he also finished his rendition of Christ the Vine (Victor). The current work of art is located at the Hellenic Institute of Venice in Venice, Italy.

== Description ==
Tree of Jesse is a tempera painting on gold leaf and wood panel. The height is 52 cm (20.4 in) and the width is 40.3 cm (15.9 in). It is almost identical in size to Victor's Christ the Vine which was completed the same year. The icon features the ancestral Davidic line of Jesus Christ and is the pictorial representation of the former Kings of Israel. Luckily the painter labeled each figure with the Greek inscription of their names. The biblical figures include from the top left Solomon (Σολομών) the central figure is King David with the traditional Greek symbols (ΑΔΑ) and Asa of Judah (Ασασ) is to our right of King David. From the second row to the left, the first figure is Rehoboam (Ροβοάμ), he is seated next to Abijah of Judah (Αβιασ), across from the two figures are Jehoshaphat (Ἰωσαφάτ) and Jehoram of Judah (Ἰωράμ). The next row below features two figures, on the left Uzziah (Ὀζίας) is seated across from Hezekiah (Εζεκίας) to our right. The next four figures below to our left are Ahaz (Ἄχαζ) next to Jotham (Ιωαθαμ), across from them to the right are Manasseh of Judah (Μανασσῆς) next to Amon of Judah (Αμών). At the bottom of the tree at the root is Abraham (Αβραάμ). The central figures are the Virgin Mary and Jesus Christ. The work also features branches symbolizing the True Vine. The Virgin is in her traditional garb the red tunic and blue mantle. The position of the Madonna and Child is the traditional Our Lady of the Sign also known as Platitera and in Italian Nostra Signora del Segno. Sometimes it is also referred to as the Nikopoios. Only two Kings adorn crowns Solomon and David and Abraham is the root of the tree as seen in other renditions of the Tree of Jesse. The work was signed (ΧΕΙΡ ΒΙΚΤΩΡΟΣ ΑΧΟΔ by the hand of Victor 1674)

== Gallery ==
=== Paintings ===
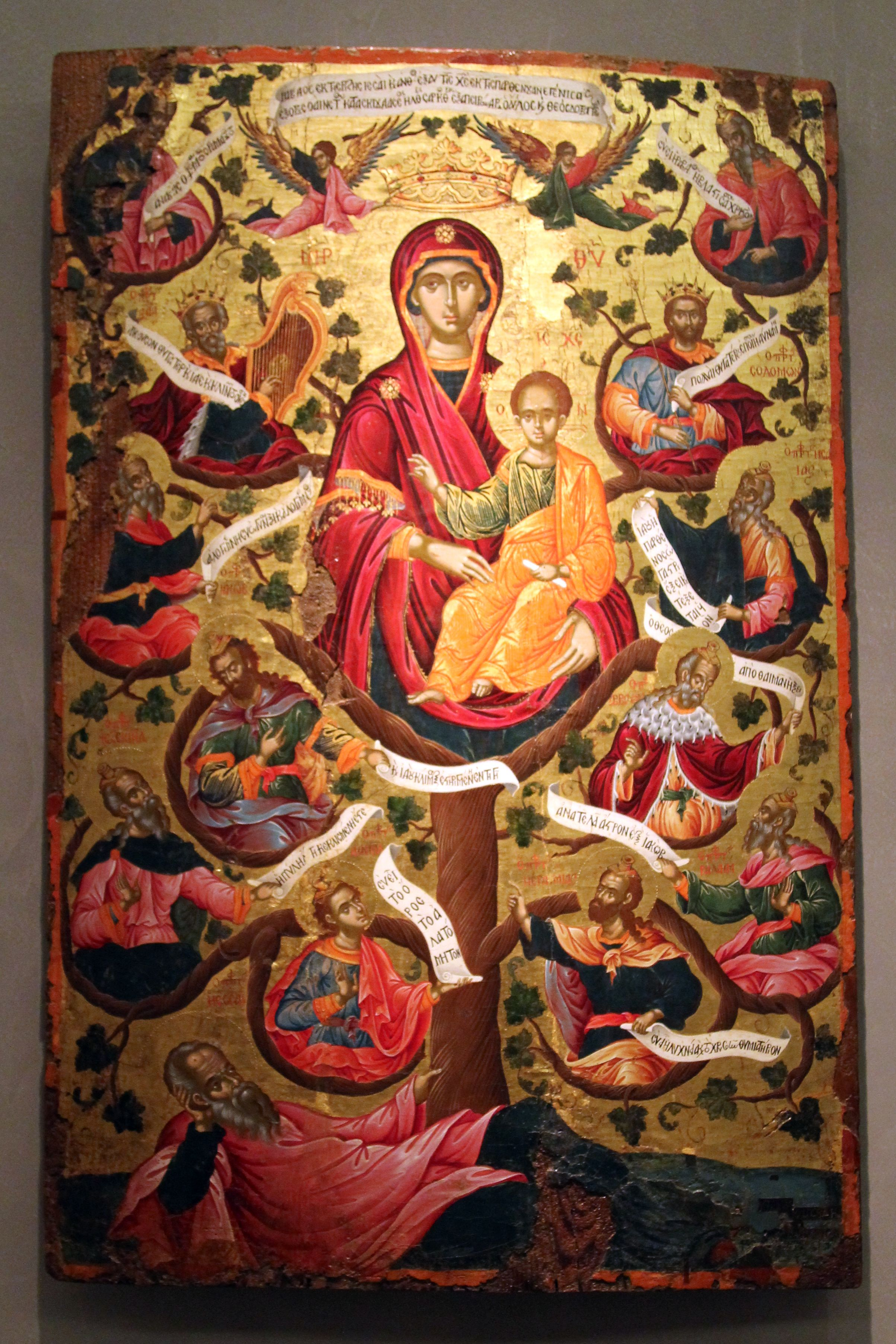
Tree of Jesse Theodore Poulakis

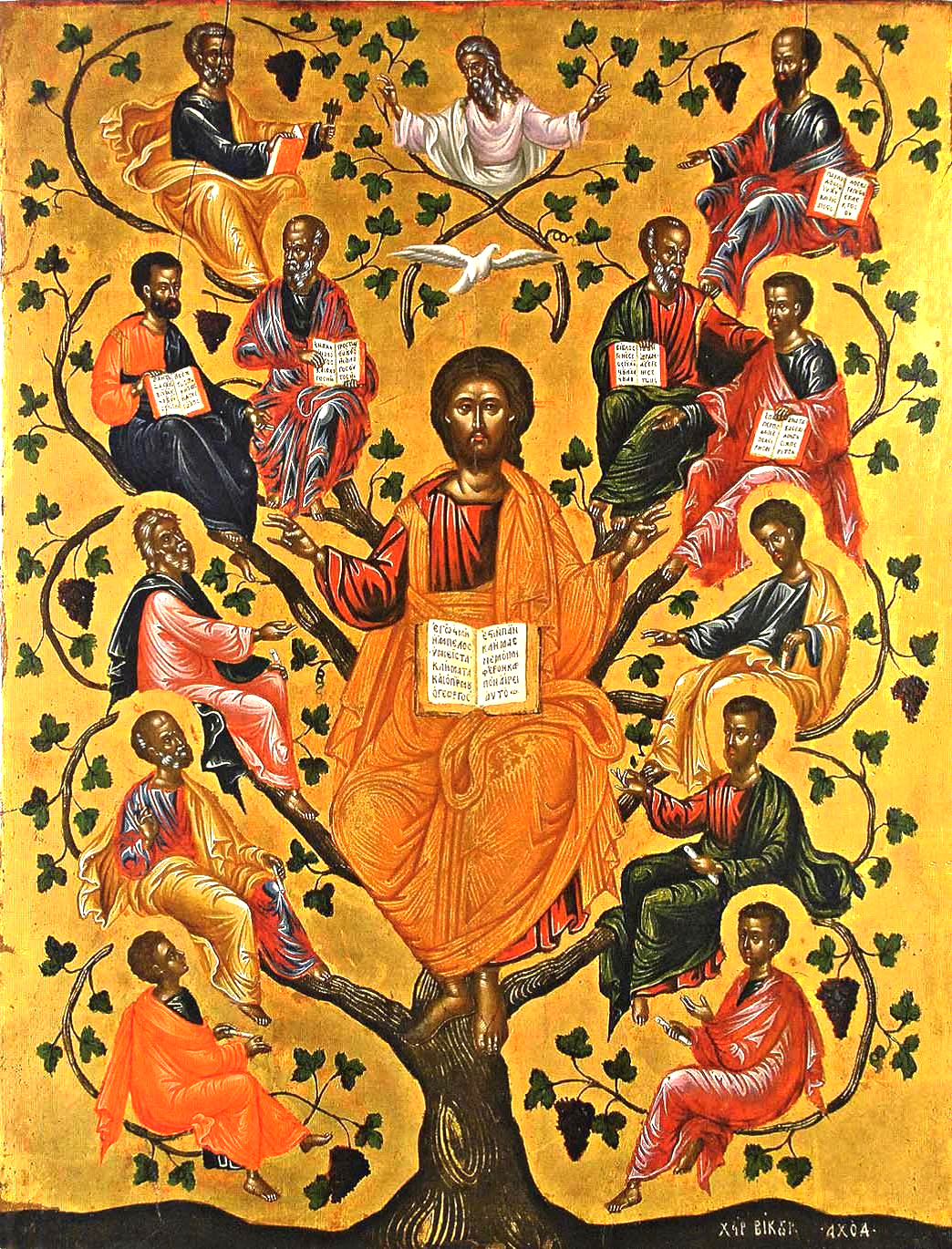
Christ the Vine Victor , 1674

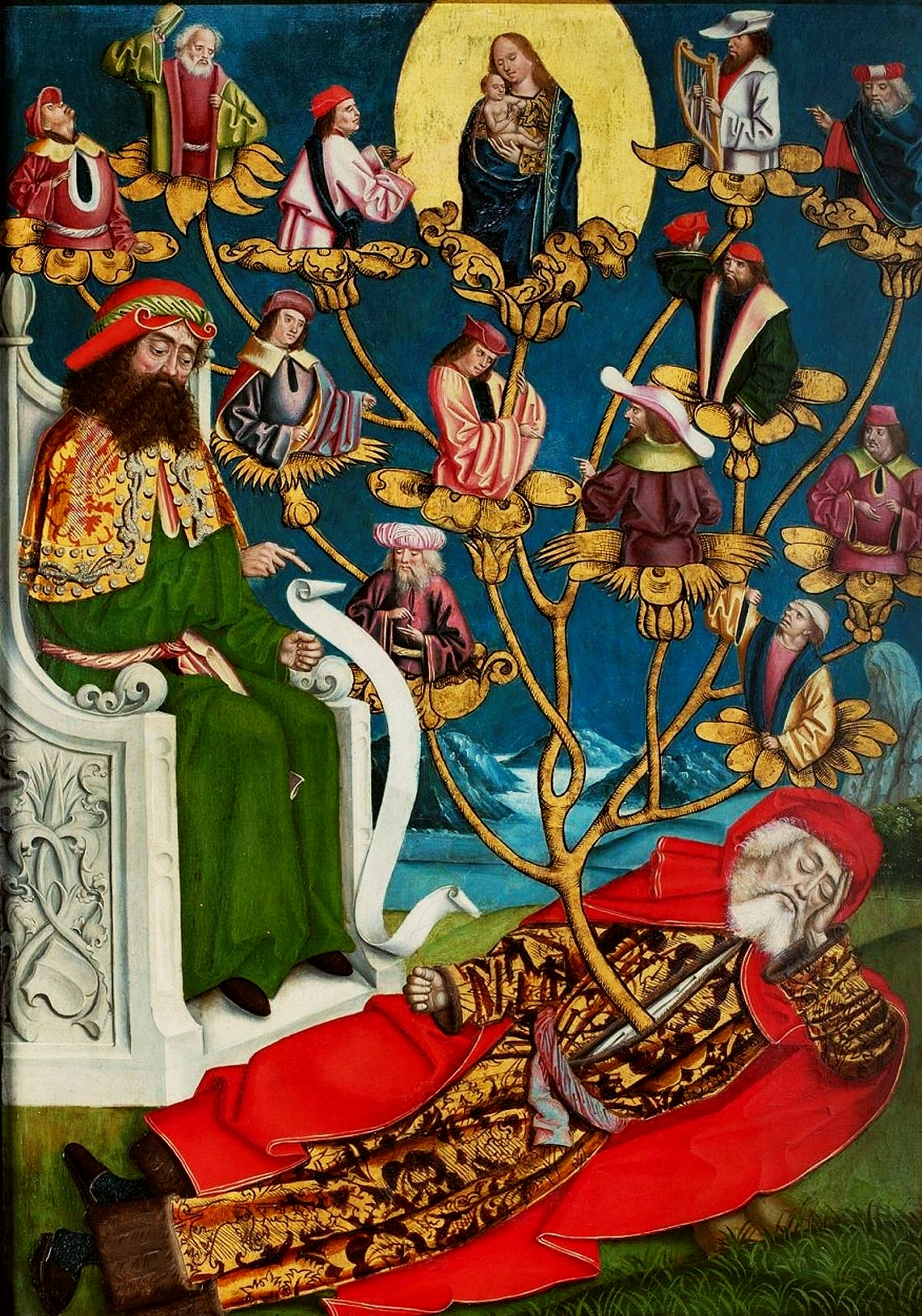
Tree of Jesse by German painter Absolon Stumme, 1499

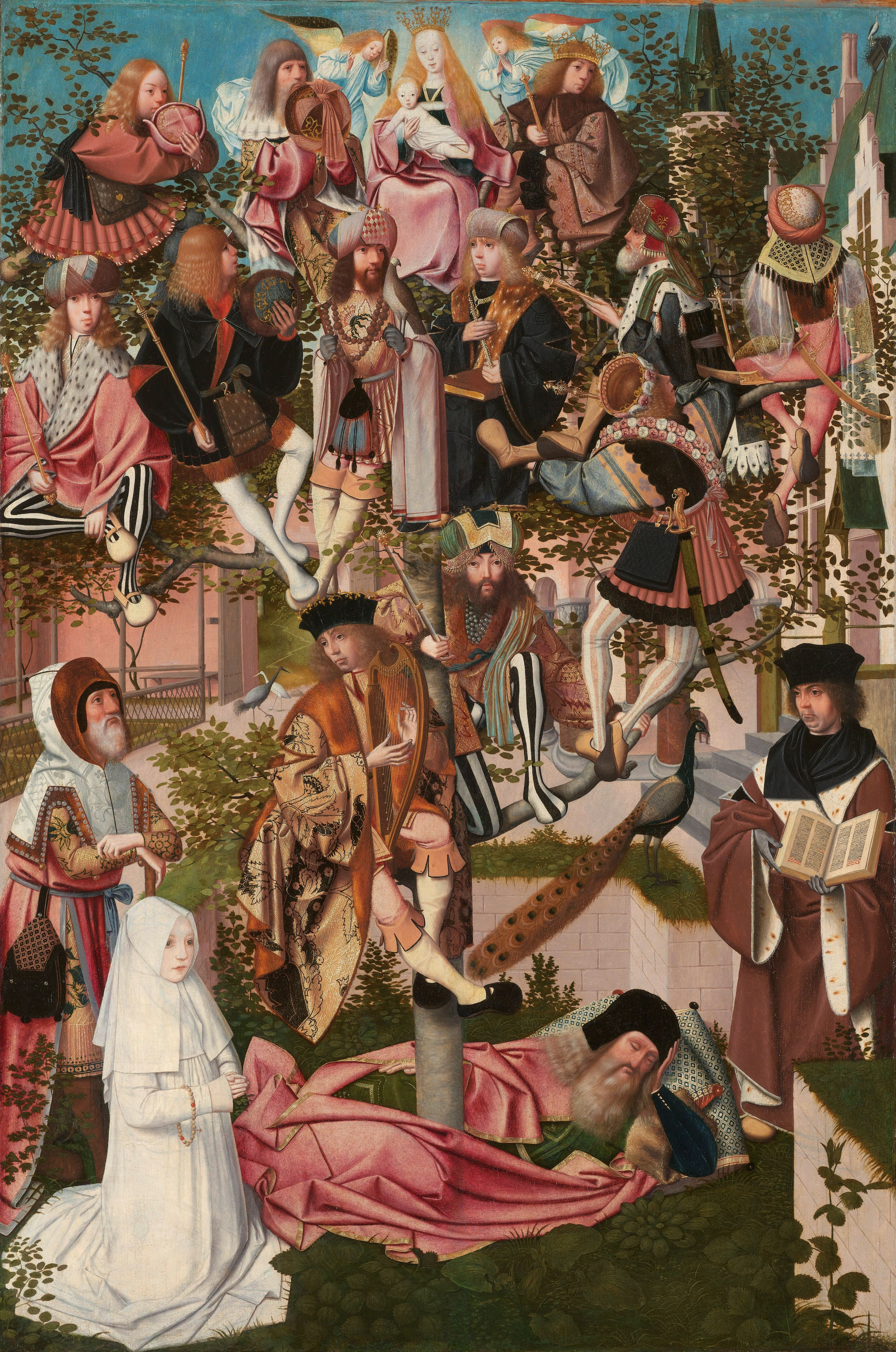
Tree of Jesse by Dutch painter Jan Mostaert, 1500

=== Manuscripts ===
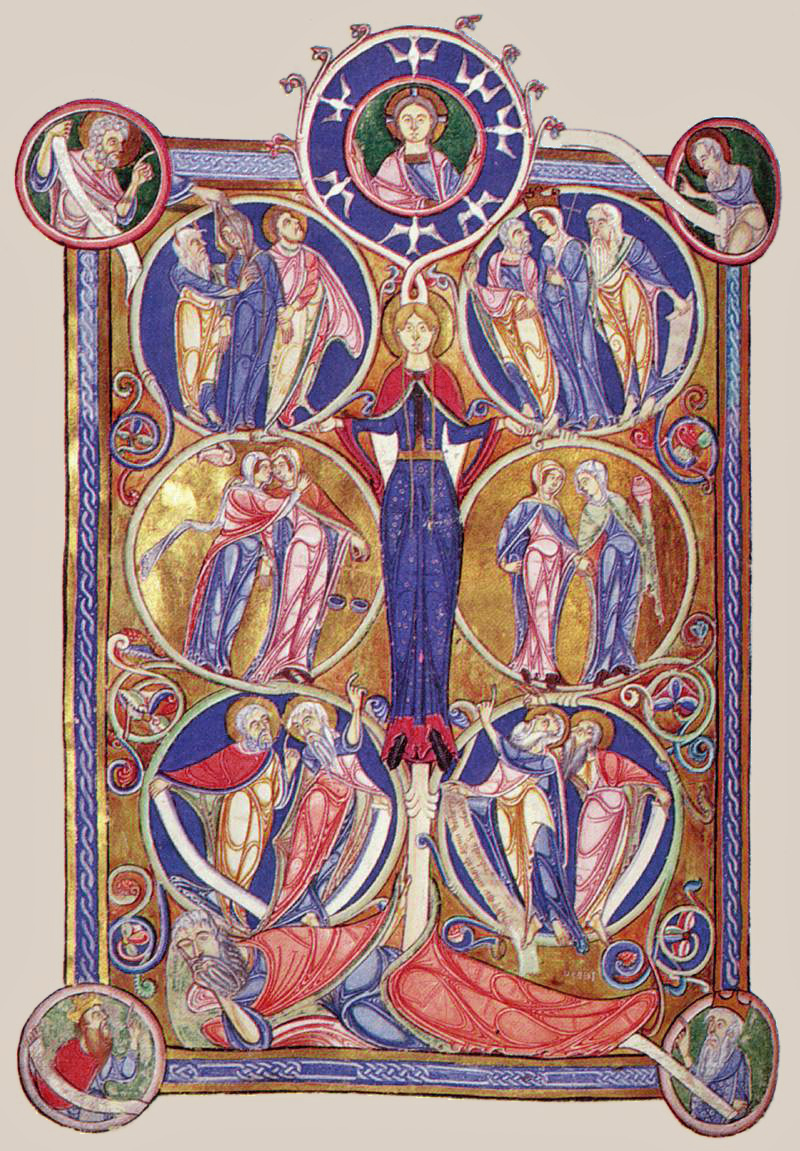
Tree of Jesse English Miniaturist 1140s (part of manuscript Lambeth Bible

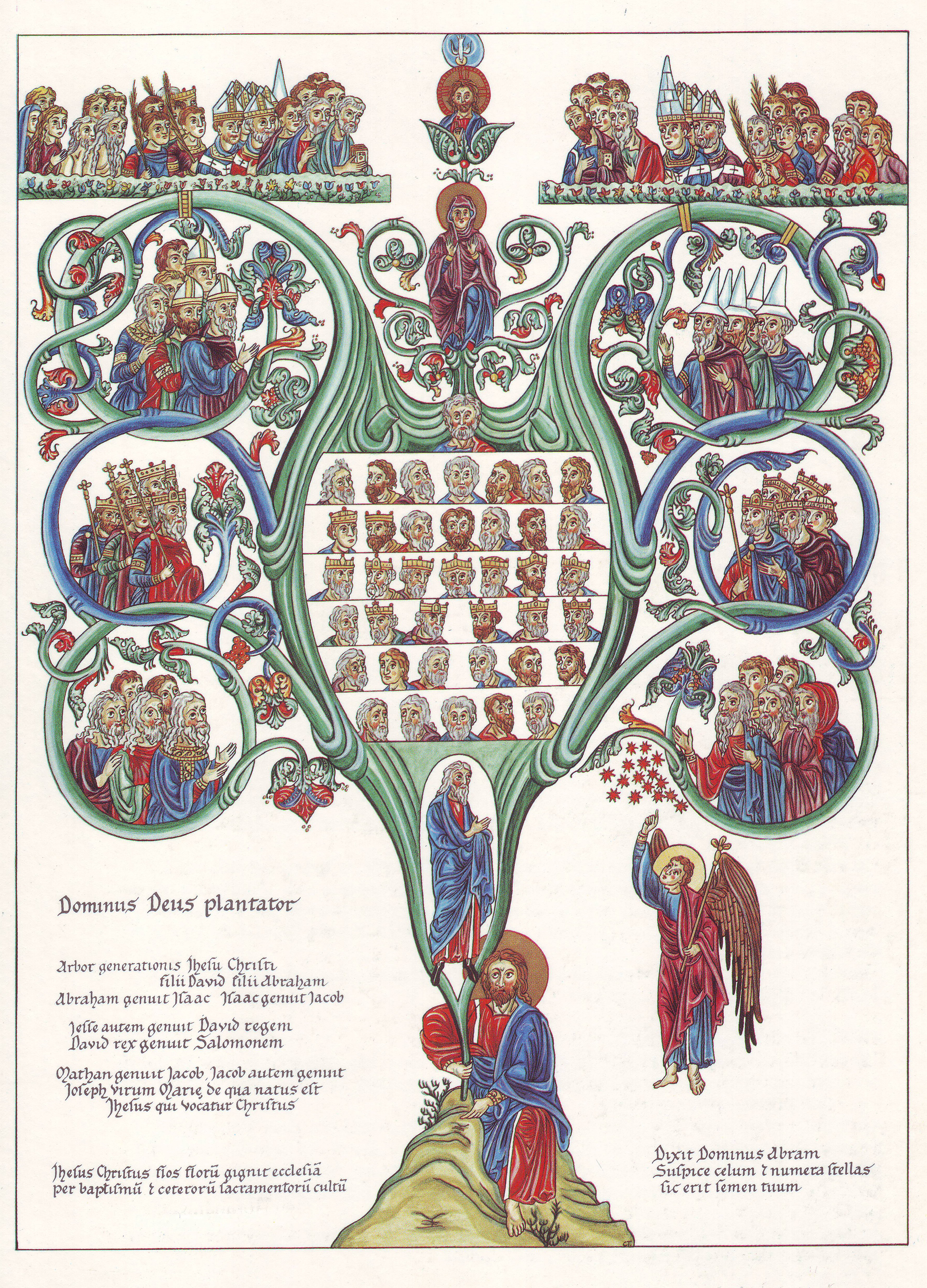
Tree of Jesse by Herrad of Landsberg, 1180 (part of manuscript Hortus deliciarum

== See also ==
- The Vine of the Virgin (Tzanes)

== Bibliography ==
- Hatzidakis, Manolis (1987). Έλληνες Ζωγράφοι μετά την Άλωση (1450-1830). Τόμος 1: Αβέρκιος - Ιωσήφ [Greek Painters after the Fall of Constantinople (1450-1830). Volume 1: Averkios - Iosif]. Athens: Center for Modern Greek Studies, National Research Foundation. hdl:10442/14844. ISBN 960-7916-01-8.
- Hatzidakis, Manolis; Drakopoulou, Evgenia (1997). Έλληνες Ζωγράφοι μετά την Άλωση (1450-1830). Τόμος 2: Καβαλλάρος - Ψαθόπουλος [Greek Painters after the Fall of Constantinople (1450-1830). Volume 2: Kavallaros - Psathopoulos]. Athens: Center for Modern Greek Studies, National Research Foundation. hdl:10442/14088. ISBN 960-7916-00-X.
- Tselenti-Papadopoulou, Niki G. (2002). Οι Εικονες της Ελληνικης Αδελφοτητας της Βενετιας απο το 16ο εως το Πρωτο Μισο του 20ου Αιωνα: Αρχειακη Τεκμηριωση [The Icons of the Greek Brotherhood of Venice from 1600 to the First Half of the 20th Century] (PDF). Athens: Ministry of Culture Publication of the Archaeological Bulletin No. 81. ISBN 960-214-221-9.
- Bladen, Victoria (2021). The Tree of Life and Arboreal Aesthetics in Early Modern Literature. New York, NY: Taylor & Francis. ISBN 9781000454819.
- Trapp, Michael (2017). Socrates from Antiquity to the Enlightenment. New York, NY: Taylor & Francis. ISBN 9781351899116.
- Green, Susan L. (2019). Tree of Jesse Iconography in Northern Europe in the Fifteenth and Sixteenth Centuries. New York: Routledge. ISBN 978-0-8153-9377-1.
