= Friedrich Nicolaus Bruhns =

German composer and music director (1637–1718)

Friedrich Nicolaus Bruhns or Brauns (11 February 1637 in Lollfuß – 13 March 1718 in Hamburg) was a German composer and music director in Hamburg.

Bruhns was born in Lollfuß, Schleswig. In 1682 he succeeded Nicolaus Adam Strungk in charge of the Hamburger Ratsmusik, later also taking on the charge of St. Mary's Cathedral. He was in practice succeeded by Johann Mattheson in 1715, but still formally held the positions till his death in Hamburg in 1718.

Handel joined the opera orchestra during Brauns' time.

Both the Johannes-Passion (1702) and Markus-Passion (1705) were for a long time attributed to Reinhard Keiser. The Markus-Passion is also attributed to Gottfried Keiser, Reinhard's father. Bach performed the Markus-Passion in Weimar and in Leipzig. Several pasticcio versions of the Markus-Passion survive, but Bach's copy preserved the original. The earliest attribution to Keiser can be found in Bach's copy.

== Works ==
- Johannes-Passion 1702, formerly attributed to Reinhard Keiser.
- Markus-Passion composed 1705, first performed at the Cathedral in 1707. Formerly attributed to Reinhard Keiser, then to Bruhns, this passion is also attributed to Gottfried Keiser, Reinhard's father.
- 11 solo cantatas
