= Wilm Dedeke =

German painter

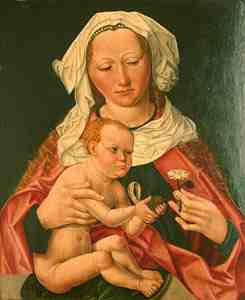
Madonna with Child (Madonna mit Kind), c. 1500

Wilm Dedeke (c. 1460 – c.1528) was a late gothic painter from Northern Germany. He was born in Lübeck.

Dedeke completed the Altar of St. Luke (Lukas-Altar) at the Hamburg Mariendom in 1499 for the Hamburg Guild of Saint Luke. It had been left unfinished by his late colleagues Hinrik Bornemann and Absolon Stumme; Dedeke married the widow of the latter man. In 1502 he attained the title of Master of the Brotherhood of St. Thomas. He has been identified with the anonymous "Master of the Halepagen Altar". He died in Hamburg.

== Works ==
- Wings of the Altar of the Brotherhood of Corpus Christi (1496) from the Cloisters in Lübeck, today in the St. Annen Museum
- Shrine of St. Anne (c.1500), also in the St. Annen Museum
- The Crucified Christ (c.1500), from the St. Catherine's Church, Hamburg, now in the collection of the Kunsthalle Hamburg
- Madonna with Child (c.1500), St. Annen Museum.

== See also ==
- List of German painters
