= The Vine of the Virgin =

Painting by Emmanuel Tzanes

- Η Ρίζα Ιεσσαί (Greek), Albero di Jesse (Italian)
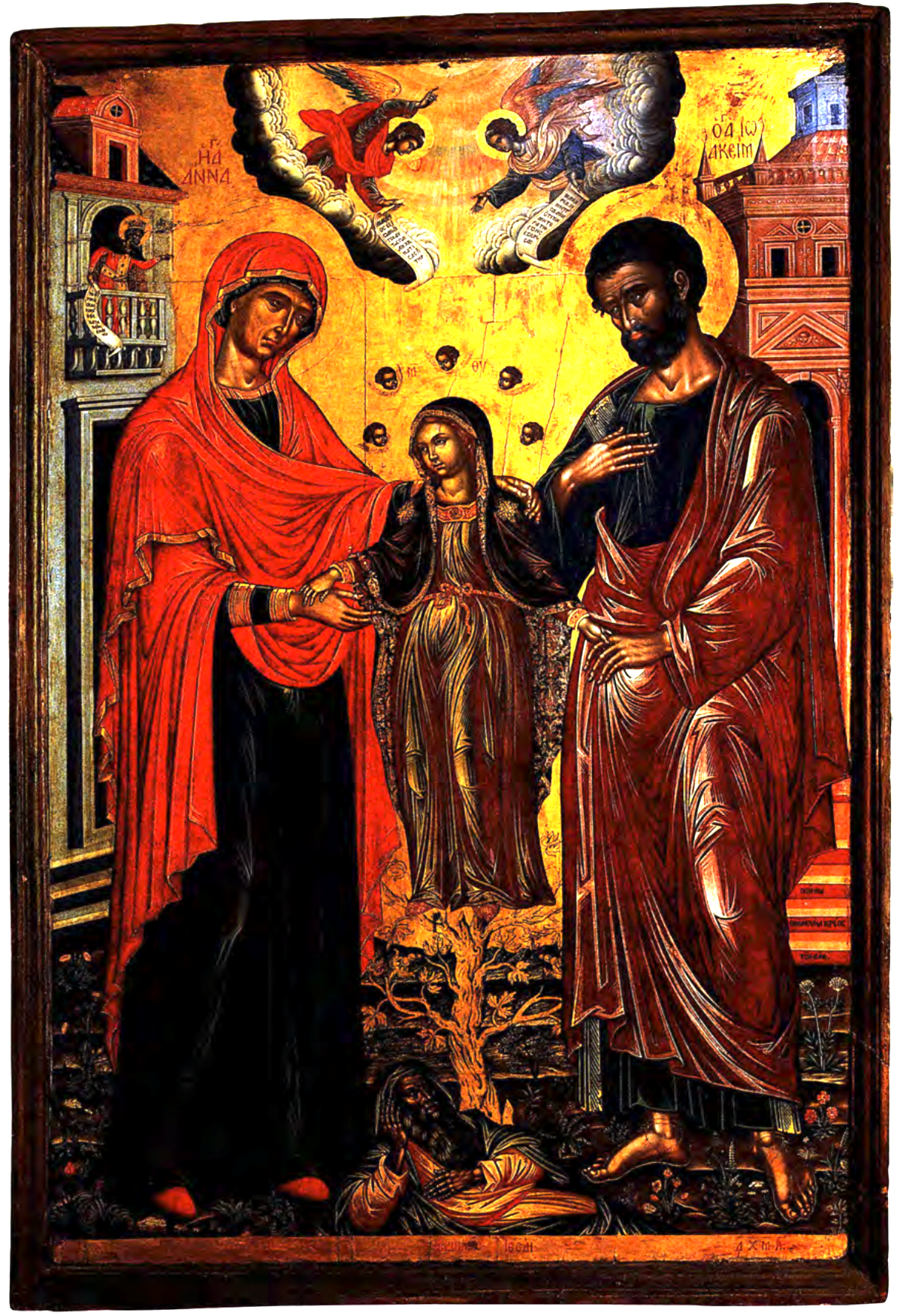
- Artist: Emmanuel Tzanes
- Year: 1644
- Medium: tempera on wood
- Movement: Cretan school
- Subject: Child Virgin Mary, Saints Anne, Joachim, and Abraham
- Dimensions: 183.8 cm × 126.4 cm (72.4 in × 49.8 in)
- Location: Hellenic Institute of Venice, Venice, Italy
- Owner: Hellenic Institute of Venice
- Accession: AMI 69

The Vine of the Virgin is a tempera painting created by Emmanuel Tzanes. Tzanes is one of the most prolific Greek painters of the 17th century and his catalog numbers over 130 known works. The iconographer was active in Crete, Corfu, and Venice, Italy. Both of his brothers Konstantinos Tzanes and Marinos Tzanes were painters. Tzanes eventually settled in Venice and was a priest at San Giorgio dei Greci where he completed a large number of his works. By that time Flemish Engravings heavily influenced Greek painters within the Venetian Empire. Tzanes belongs to the Late Cretan School and Heptanese School of painting.

Jesse of Bethlehem was the father of King David and his name is associated with many artistic renditions of biblical family trees. The original use of the family tree is known as the Tree of Jesse and it is a schematic representation of genealogy and originated in a passage from the biblical Book of Isaiah. The book describes the descent of the Messiah (Mashiach) and the tree is the depiction in art of the ancestors of Jesus Christ and the Virgin Mary. In this rendition, the Tree of Jesse (Ρίζα του Ιεσσαί) depicts the ancestral Davidic line of the Virgin Mary with Jesse as its root. The Tree of Jesse has appeared numerous times in Greek Italian Byzantine art and one notable work featuring the Virgin Mary was completed by Victor in 1674 entitled Tree of Jesse. The Vine of the Virgin is part of the collection of the Hellenic Institute of Venice and is located in Venice, Italy.(Matthew 1:1)

== Description ==
Tree of Jesse is a tempera painting on gold leaf and wood panel. The height is 72.4 in (183.8 cm) and the width is 49.8 in (126.4 cm). The work was completed in 1644 before the painter migrated from Crete to Corfu where he spent eight years. The work follows the traditional Greek Italian Byzantine painting style and was influenced by the works of Angelos Akotantos. Saint Anne is wearing her traditional Byzantinesque orange tunic and both Joachim and Saint Anne are long slender and sculpturesque. The facial dimensions of the painting reflect a more refined realism of the Late Cretan School compared to the Early Cretan School works of Angelos. The work is a clear depiction of the integration of Venetian painting and the Maniera greca. The Virgin is floating in the air and she is propped up by a small tree, at the bottom of the tree Jesse is depicted as the root and he is labeled by a Greek inscription Ιεσσαί. Jesse the father of David can trace his lineage to Abraham. The Virgin is wearing a lavish costume with intricate ornamentation. Five angel heads are floating above the Virgin Mary while she is touching both of her parents' hands in an act of reassurance and affection. A religious figure on a balcony addresses an audience the figure is possibly Zacharias. Zacharias is typically depicted with the young Virgin Mary and her parents Joachim and Saint Anne. The work is full of inscriptions and features the signature of the painter along with the date of completion ΠΟΙΗΜΑ ΕΜΜΑΝΟΥΗΛ ΙΕΡΕΩΣ ΤΟΥ ΤΖΑΝΕ ΑΧΜΔ (POEM OF THE PRIEST EMMANUEL TZANE 1644).

== Gallery ==
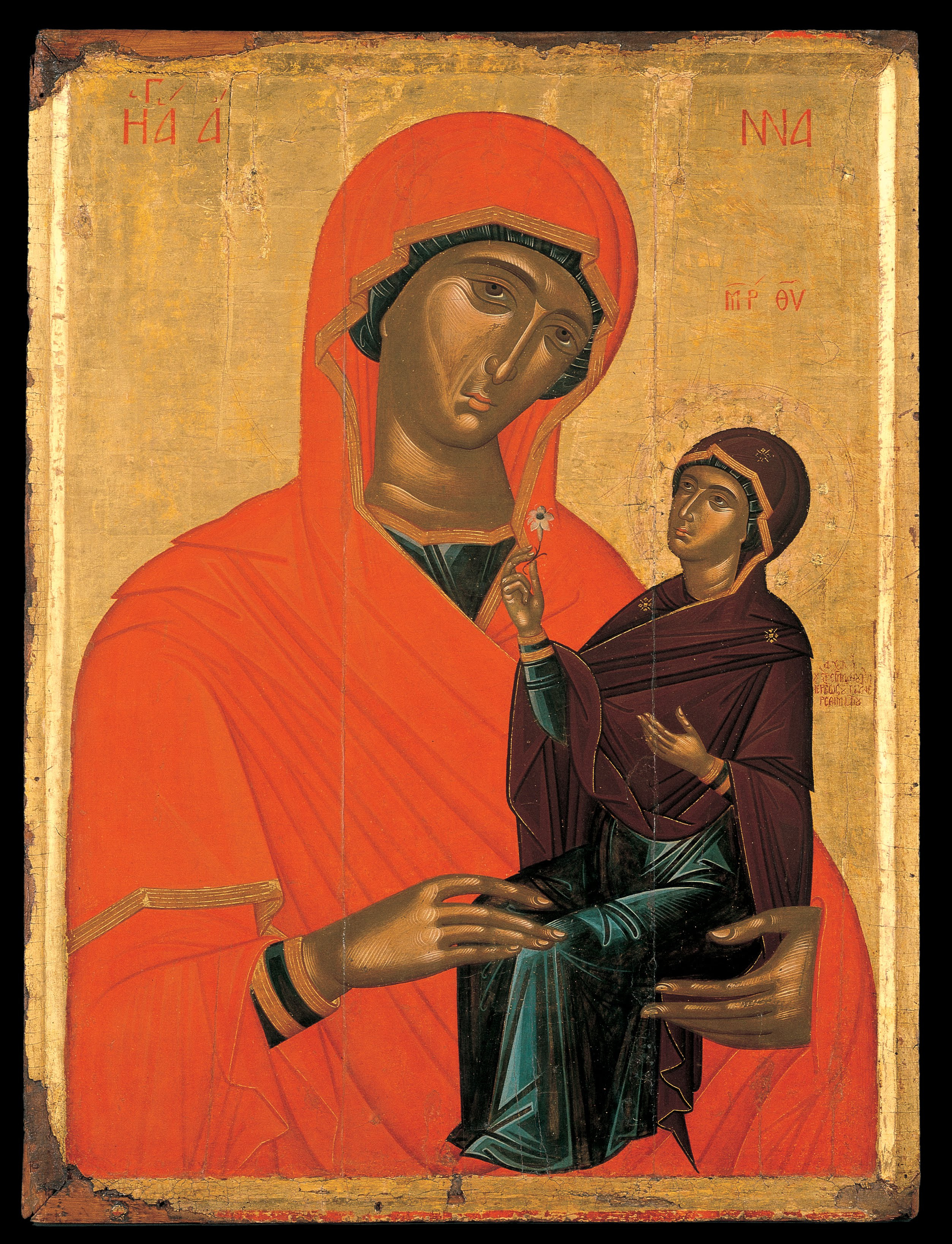
Saint Anne with the Virgin

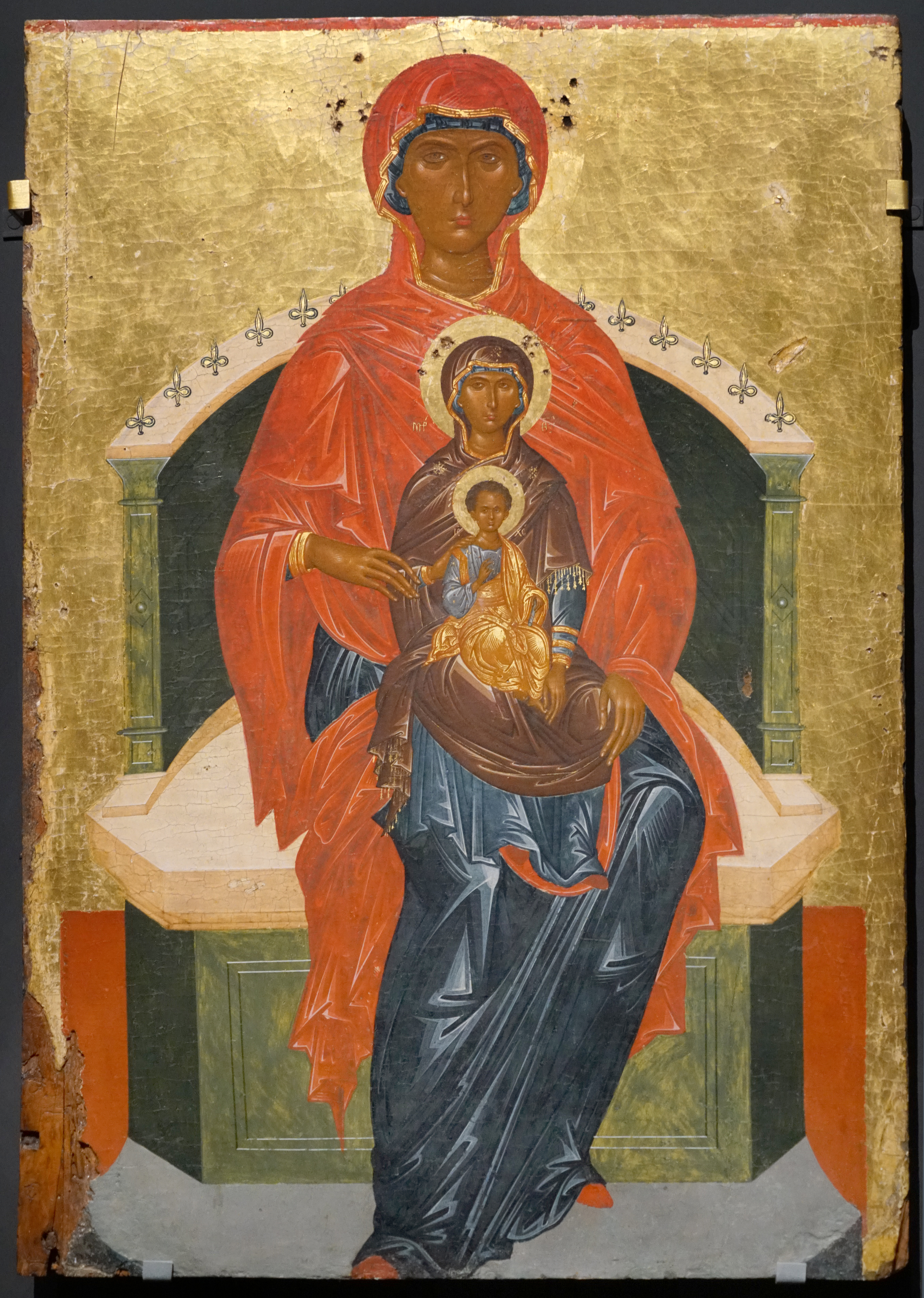
Saint Anne, the Virgin Mary, and Christ

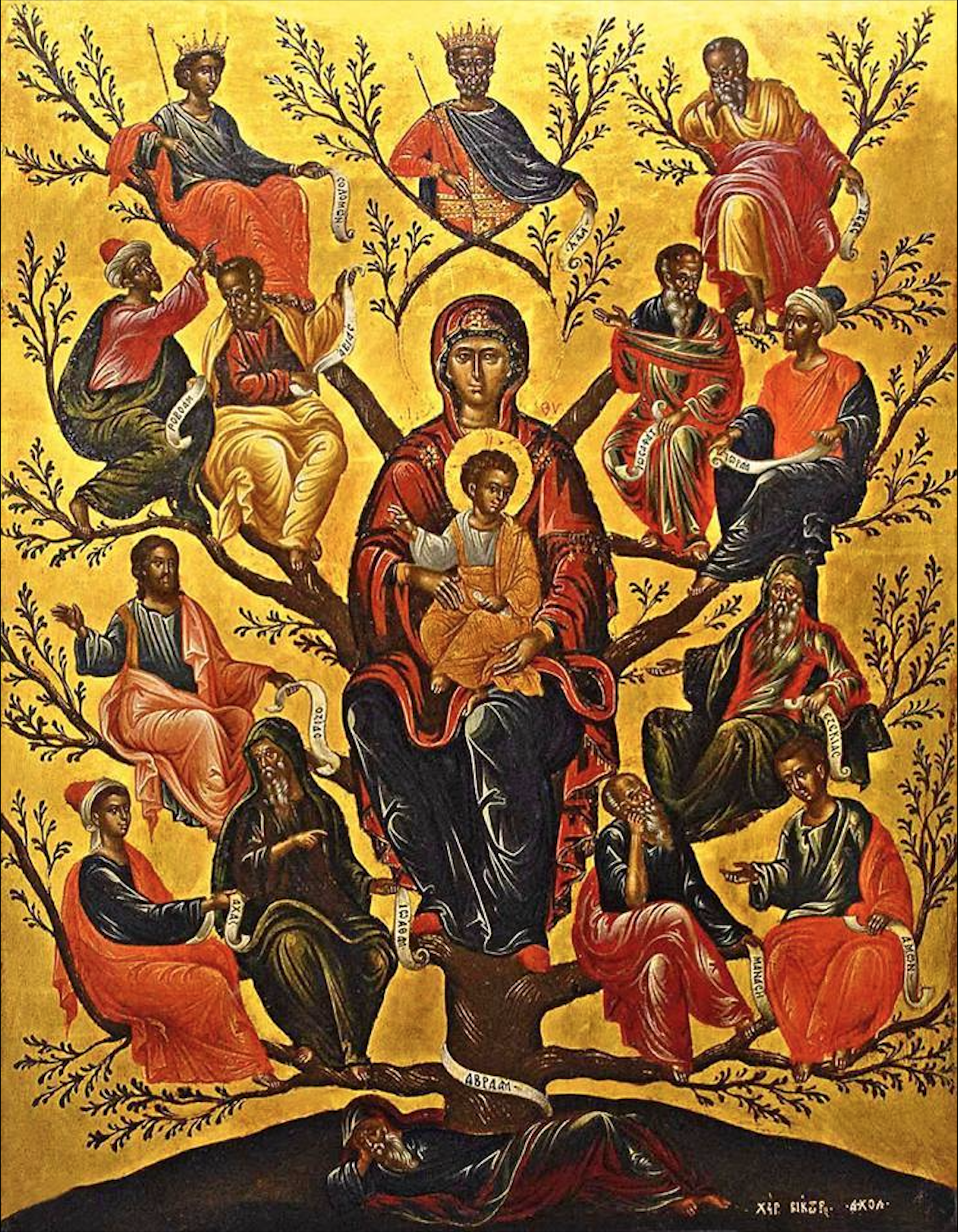
Tree of Jesse

== Bibliography ==
- Hatzidakis, Manolis; Drakopoulou, Evgenia (1997). Έλληνες Ζωγράφοι μετά την Άλωση (1450-1830). Τόμος 2: Καβαλλάρος - Ψαθόπουλος [Greek Painters after the Fall of Constantinople (1450-1830). Volume 2: Kavallaros - Psathopoulos]. Athens: Center for Modern Greek Studies, National Research Foundation. hdl:10442/14088. ISBN 960-7916-00-X.
- Tselenti-Papadopoulou, Niki G. (2002). Οι Εικονες της Ελληνικης Αδελφοτητας της Βενετιας απο το 16ο εως το Πρωτο Μισο του 20ου Αιωνα: Αρχειακη Τεκμηριωση [The Icons of the Greek Brotherhood of Venice from 1600 to First Half of the 20th Century] (PDF). Athens: Ministry of Culture Publication of the Archaeological Bulletin No. 81. ISBN 960-214-221-9.
- Bladen, Victoria (2021). The Tree of Life and Arboreal Aesthetics in Early Modern Literature. New York, NY: Taylor & Francis. ISBN 9781000454819.
- Green, Susan L. (2019). Tree of Jesse Iconography in Northern Europe in the Fifteenth and Sixteenth Centuries. New York: Routledge. ISBN 978-0-8153-9377-1.
