= Hinrik Funhof =

German painter

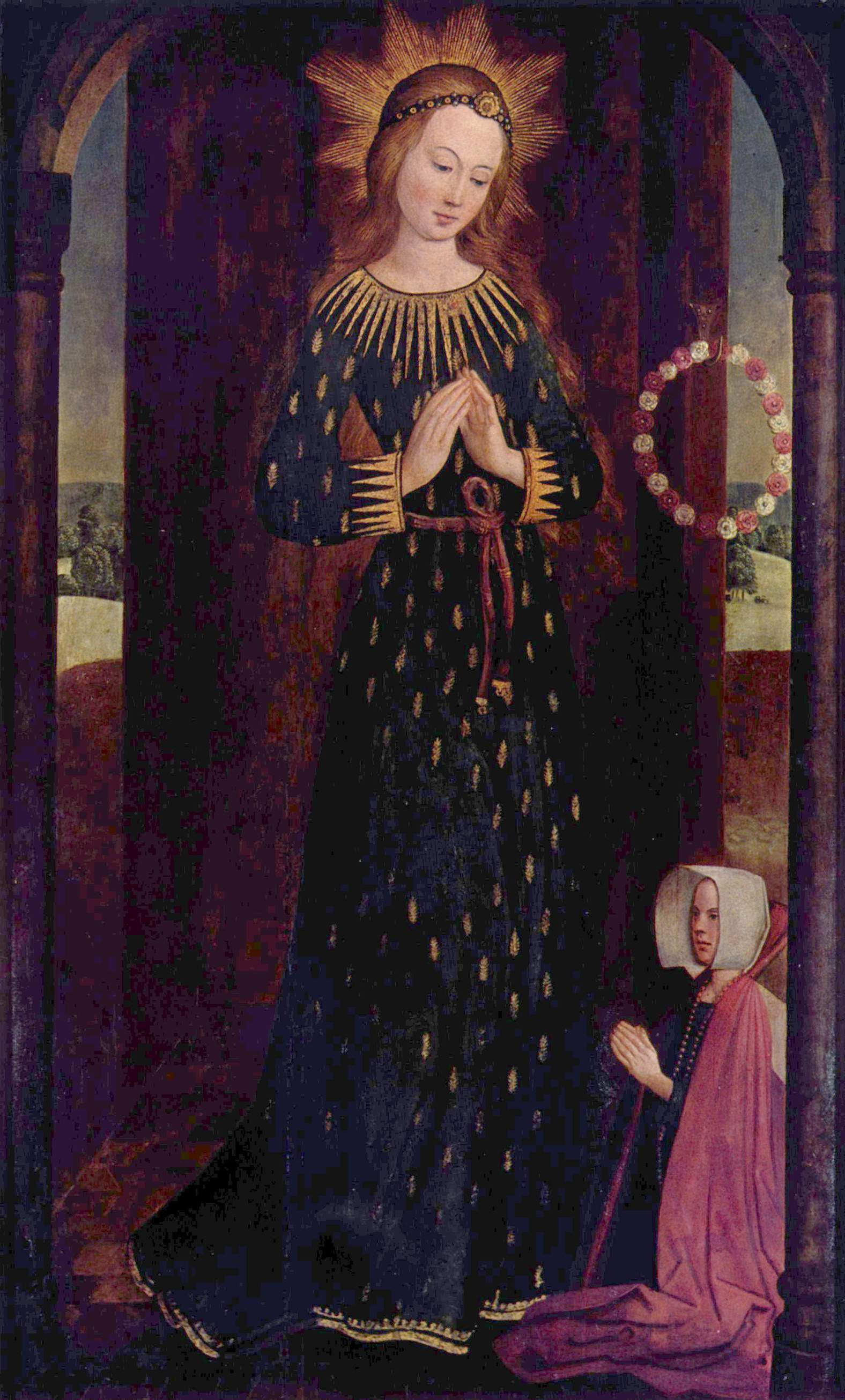
- The Virgin Mary with Headdress (ca. 1480, DE: Maria mit Ährenkleid), in the collection of the Hamburger Kunsthalle
- Died: 1485
- Other names: Henrik Funhof
- Occupations: Painter, late Gothic

Hinrik Funhof (died 1485, also spelled Henrik Funhof) was a late Gothic painter who lived and worked in Hamburg. After the death of his colleague Hans Bornemann in 1475, he took over Bornemann's studio and married his widow. When Funhof died ten years later, she remarried to another Hamburg painter, Absolon Stumme.

== Works ==
Only a few of his works survive, namely:

- The Virgin Mary with Headdress (ca. 1480, DE: Maria mit Ährenkleid), in the collection of the Hamburger Kunsthalle
- The Marriage at Cana (ca. 1481, DE: Hochzeit zu Kana, in a private collection.
- The outer sides of the wings of the 1482 Altarpiece in St. John's Church, Lüneburg

== See also ==
- List of German painters
