= Johann Wolfgang Franck =

Johann Wolfgang Franck (17 June 1644 in Unterschwaningen, Mittelfranken – c. 1710 in London) was a German baroque composer.

== Life ==
He worked from 1673 to 1679 as Kapellmeister in Ansbach and then lived from 1679 to 1690 in Hamburg. Here he initially composed several geistliche Sing-Spiele for the Oper am Gänsemarkt. From 1682 to 1685 he held the position of cantor in St. Mary's Cathedral. From 1690 he lived in London. Together with Robert King, he went there first as a concert promoter (1690 to 1693) and was thereafter only active as composer. Besides operas, he produced some songs (especially for the Concerts in London), cantatas and numerous hymn tunes.

== Works ==
=== Operas ===
- Die errettete Unschuld, oder Andromeda und Perseus, Ansbach, 1675
- Der verliebte Föbus, Ansbach, 1678
- Die drey Töchter (des) Cecrops, Ansbach, 1679
- Don Pedro, oder Die abgestraffte Eyffersucht, Hamburg, 1679
- Die macchabaeische Mutter mit ihren sieben Söhnen, Hamburg, 1679
- Pastorelle, Lustschloss, Triesdorff, Ansbach, 1679
- Die wohl- und beständig-liebende Michal, oder Der siegende und fliehende David, Hamburg, 1679
- Aeneae, des trojanischen Fürsten Ankunft in Italien, Hamburg, 1680
- Alceste, Hamburg, 1680
- Sein selbst Gefangener, Hamburg, 1680
- Charitine, oder Göttlich-Geliebte, Hamburg, 1681
- Hannibal, Hamburg, 1681
- Semele, Hamburg, 1681
- Vespasian, Hamburg, 1681
- Attila, Hamburg, 1682
- Diocletianus, Hamburg, 1682
- Der glückliche Gross-Vezier Cara Mustaphaen, Hamburg, 1686

=== Incidental music ===
- Love’s Last Shift, London, 1696
- The Judgment of Paris, London, 1702
- 3 lost dramatic works

=== Cantatas ===
- 11 Cantatas
- 61 lost cants.
- 12 lost Tafelstücke

=== Sacred and secular songs ===
- Passionsgedanken (lost)
- Geistliche Lieder, 2vv, opt. bc Hamburg, 1681, repr. in Geistliches Gesangbuch
- M. Heinrich Elmenhorsts besungene Vorfallungen, 1v, bc Hamburg, 1682, repr. in Geistliches Gesangbuch
- Geistliches Gesangbuch, 1v, bc Hamburg, 1685, repr. with works by G. Böhm and P.L. Wockenfuss in M. Heinrich Elmenhorsts … geistreiche Lieder
- Erster Theil musicalischer Andachten, 1v, bc Hamburg, 1687
- Remedium melancholiae, or The Remedy of Melancholy, 1v, bc, 1690
- A New Song on King William (London, c1690)
- 15 Songs in the Gentleman’s Journal (1692–4)
- O Jesus, Grant Me Hope and Comfort

=== Instrumental ===
- 6 2vl sonatas, lost

== Sources ==
- George J. Buelow's article in New Grove Dictionary of Music
- W. Braun: Johann Wolfgang Franck: Hamburger Opernarien in szenischen Kontext (1988)
