= Hinrik Bornemann =

German painter

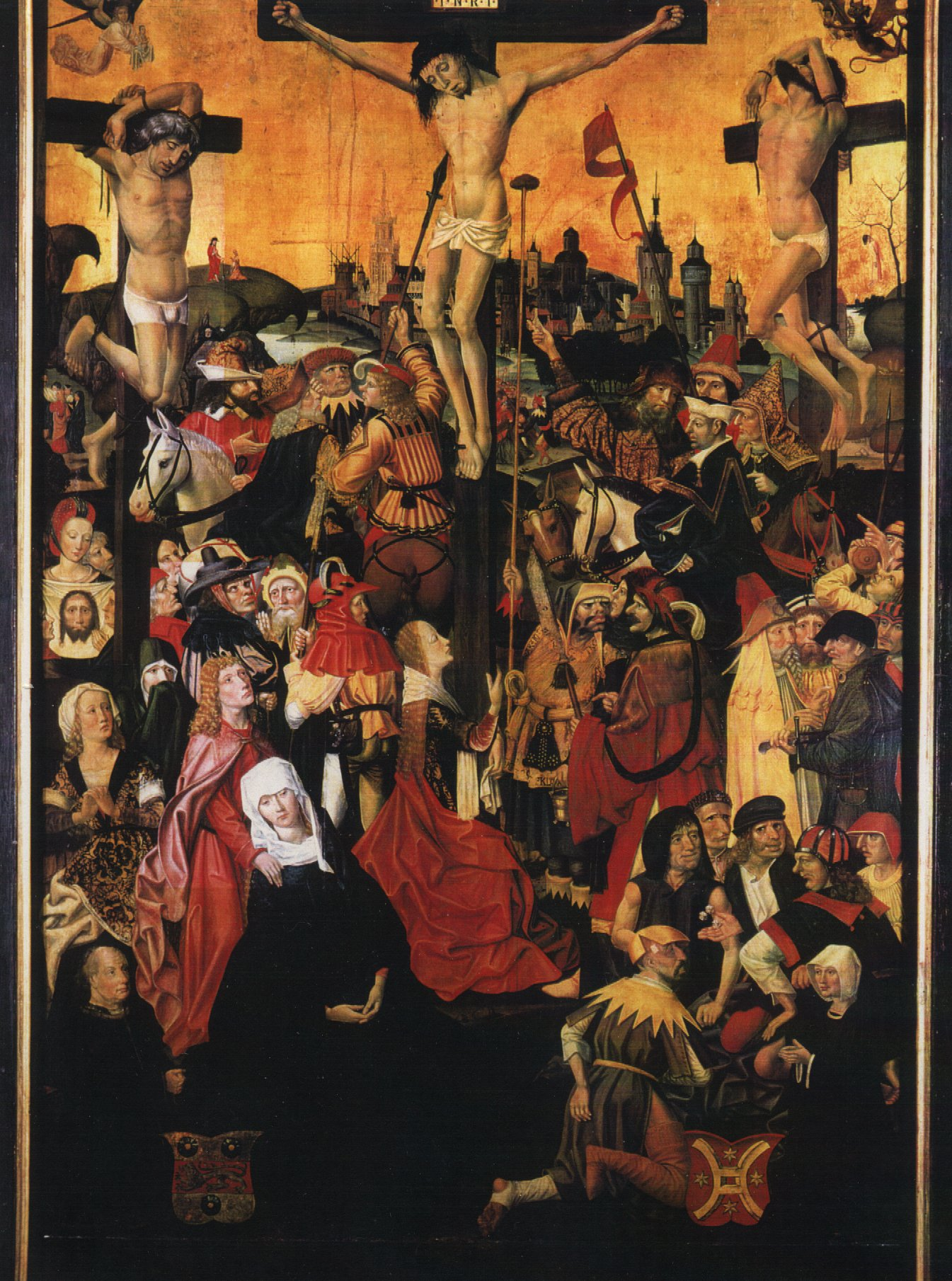
The Crucifixion, c. 1490

Hinrik Bornemann (b. circa 1450 in Hamburg, d. 1499- Also known as Henrik Bornemann or Hinrich Bornemann) was a Northern German Late Gothic painter. He was the son of Hans Bornemann, who died in 1474. After his father's death his mother was thrice remarried to painters- to Hinrik Funhof (d. 1485), to Absolon Stumme (d. 1499), and then finally to Wilm Dedeke (d. 1528). His main work was the Altarpiece of St. Luke (Lukas-Altar) for St. Mary's Cathedral in Hamburg, now shown in St. James the Greater Church. Upon his death in 1499 it was left unfinished, and was completed by Wilm Dedeke.

== See also ==
- List of German painters
