= Hamburger Ratsmusik =

The Hamburger Ratsmusik was the name, in German, for the Hamburg city government musical establishment of Hamburg during the baroque period. Ratsmusik was a generic term to distinguish from Hausmusik, domestic music making, during the Hanseatic period.

It is also the name of a modern ensemble for early music. Hamburger Ratsmusik, led by Simone Eckert.

== Directors ==
- 1608-1610 and 1613-1615 William Brade
- 1616- Christian Hildebrand
- 1621- Johann Schop, with a salary of 800 marks.
- 1665- Samuel Peter Sidon
- 1667- Dietrich Becker
- 1678- Nicolaus Adam Strungk
- 1682- Friedrich Nicolaus Brauns
- 1718- Hieronymus Oldenburg
- 1721- Georg Philipp Telemann
- 1768- Carl Philipp Emanuel Bach
- 1789- Christian Friedrich Gottlieb Schwenke, the last Musikdirector of the five churches.
