= Elsa Bornemann =

Argentine children's writer, polyglot and composer

Elsa Bornemann (February 20, 1952 – May 24, 2013) was an Argentine children's writer who was a doctor of the Arts, polyglot and composer. Her books have been translated into many languages, including Braille.

== Biography ==
Elsa Isabel Bornemann was born on 20 February 1952 in the neighbourhood of Parque Patricios in Buenos Aires City. She was the daughter of Wilhelm Karl Henri Bornemann, a German immigrant, and Blanca Nieves (Blancanieves) Fernández, an Argentine of Portuguese and Spanish descent, and was the youngest of three sisters.

She obtained the teacher qualification of Maestra Normal Nacional at the Escuela Normal No. 11 Ricardo Levene. She earned a degree in Literature from the Faculty of Philosophy and Letters of the University of Buenos Aires, completed a doctorate, and obtained several study diplomas in English, German, Italian, Latin, Ancient Greek and Hebrew. She taught at all educational levels, delivered numerous courses and lectures, and participated in a variety of round tables and juries.

During the last military dictatorship that governed Argentina, self-styled the National Reorganization Process, her book Un elefante ocupa mucho espacio was censored and she was included among banned authors. That book was included in the 1976 Honour List of the International Board on Books for Young People (IBBY) of the Hans Christian Andersen Award, making her the first Argentine to be recognized in such a manner. Later, her books El último Mago o Bilembambudín and Disparatario were selected for inclusion in the White Ravens list, a distinction awarded by the International Youth Library in Munich, Germany.

She undertook numerous courses and workshops on literature with Professor Manuel Kedes in Argentina as well as in the Americas, Europe and Japan. She wrote poetry, novels and short stories, exploring themes such as love, humour and horror. Many of her works have been reproduced in primary-school readers, literature textbooks for different levels, and Argentine and international anthologies.

Some of her books like Socorro or Queridos monstruos sold more than 100 thousands copies.

In 2004, the Konex Foundation awarded Merit Diplomas to one hundred distinguished figures of the decade 1994–2003 in Argentine Letters. In the last twenty years, editions of her books published by Alfaguara have exceeded two million copies.

She died on 24 May 2013 in Buenos Aires, Argentina.

== Tributes ==
In August 2025, residents of the Parque Patricios neighbourhood presented a private bill to rename Parque José Evaristo Uriburu as "Parque Elsa Isabel Bornemann", in tribute to her strong connection with the neighbourhood, where she was born and found inspiration for her works in nearby green spaces such as the pavements and the park itself. The initiative seeks to promote education, culture and freedom of expression, highlighting the role of the park in the protection of childhood, in line with Bornemann’s legacy as an author of children's and young adult literature.

== Books ==
- Un elefante ocupa mucho espacio
- El libro de los chicos enamorados
- Queridos monstruos
- Los desmaravilladores
- Disparatario
- Los Grendelines
- Sol de noche
- Corazonadas
- No hagan olas
- ¡Socorro! Doce cuentos para caerse de miedo
- El último mago
- Lisa de los paraguas
- El niño envuelto
- Mil grullas
- Un amor disparatado
- Cuadernos de un delfín
- Se mató un tomate

== Awards and distinctions ==
- Faja de Honor de la Sociedad Argentina de Escritores (1972)
- San Francisco de Asís Award (1977)
- "Alicia Moreau de Justo" Award (1985)
- Special Mention in the National Award of Children's Literature (1986)
- Honor Roll of the Hans Christian Andersen Award (1976)
- Platinum Konex Award (1994)
