= Absolon Stumme =

German painter

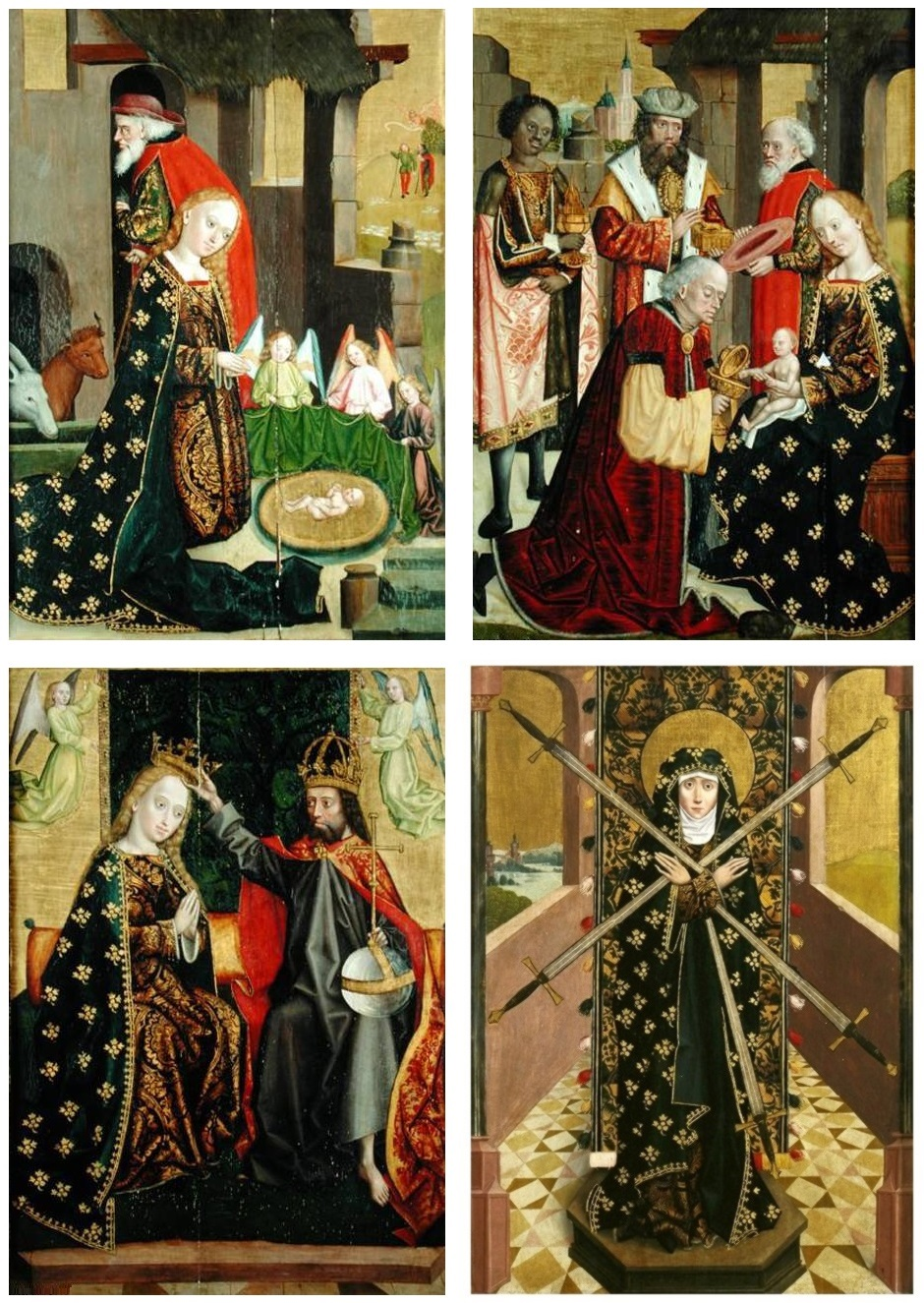
A wing of the so-called Hamburg Altar (1499), National Museum in Warsaw.

Absolon Stumme (died 1499) was a Late Gothic painter from Northern Germany who worked in Hamburg.

Absolon Stumme married into the Bornemann family of artists, becoming the second stepfather of Hinrik Bornemann, who died the same year as he did. After their deaths the Hamburg Cathedral altarpiece, upon which they had been working, was finished by Wilm Dedeke. It is debated by 20th-century art historians which of the two is recorded as the Master of the Hamburg cathedral altar. Both are also associated with the Master of the Lüneburg foot washing.
