= Christian Bornemann =

German Windsurfer

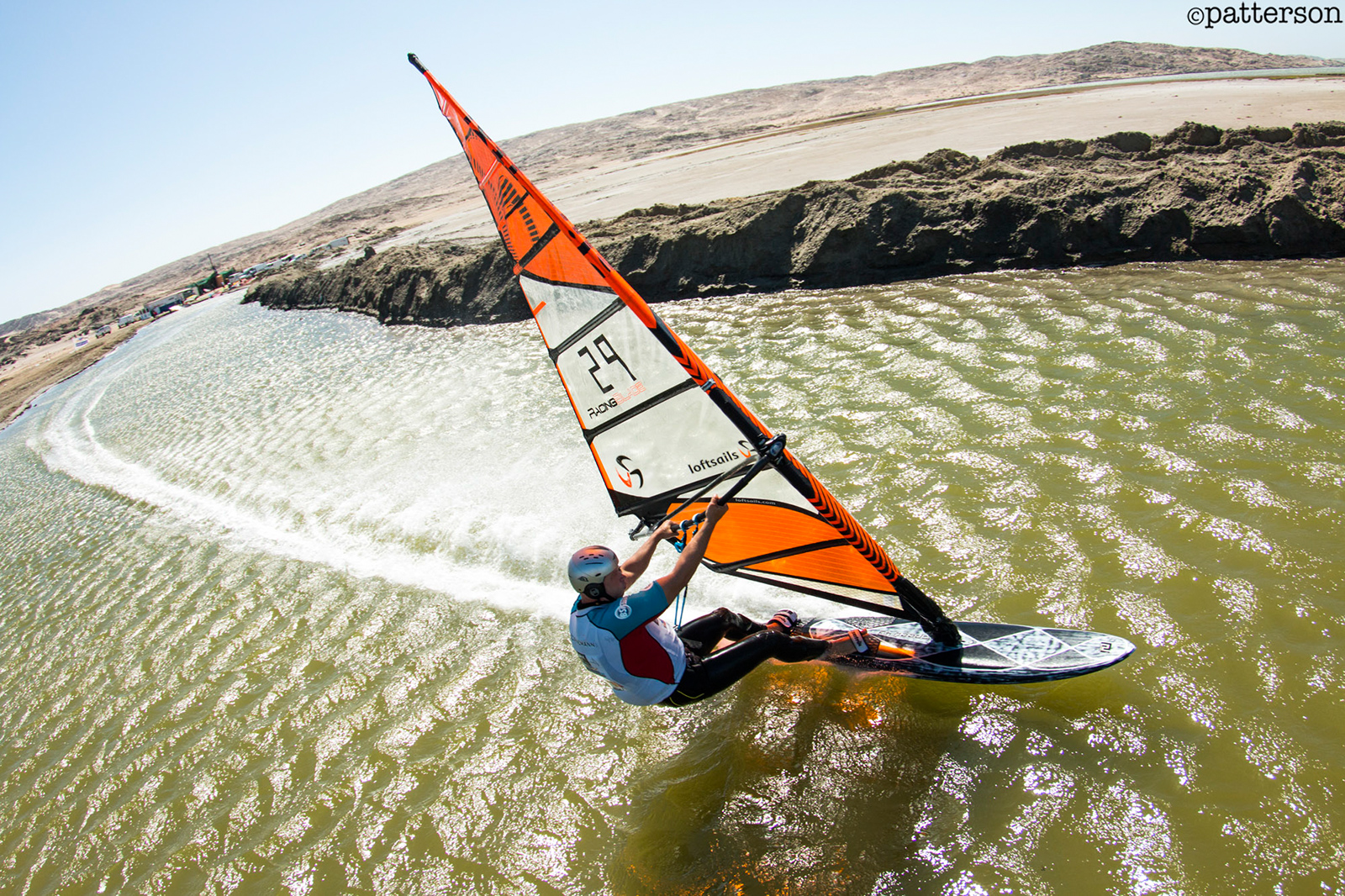
- Christian Bornemann

Personal information
- Born: 22 October 1965 (age 60) Dortmund, Germany
- Height: 189 cm (6 ft 2 in)

Surfing career
- Sport: Surfing
- Best year: 2015
- Sponsors: Patrik Boards, Loftsails, Design Lessacher
- Major achievements: Best time: 50.20 knots (92.97 km/h) / 500 meters (2015)

Christian Bornemann (* 22 October 1965 in Dortmund) is a German Windsurfer. He held 2014–2018 the German speed record over 500-meter, and since 2018 the German speed record over the nautical mile (1852 meter) and is one of the twenty fastest windsurfers in the world.

== Life ==
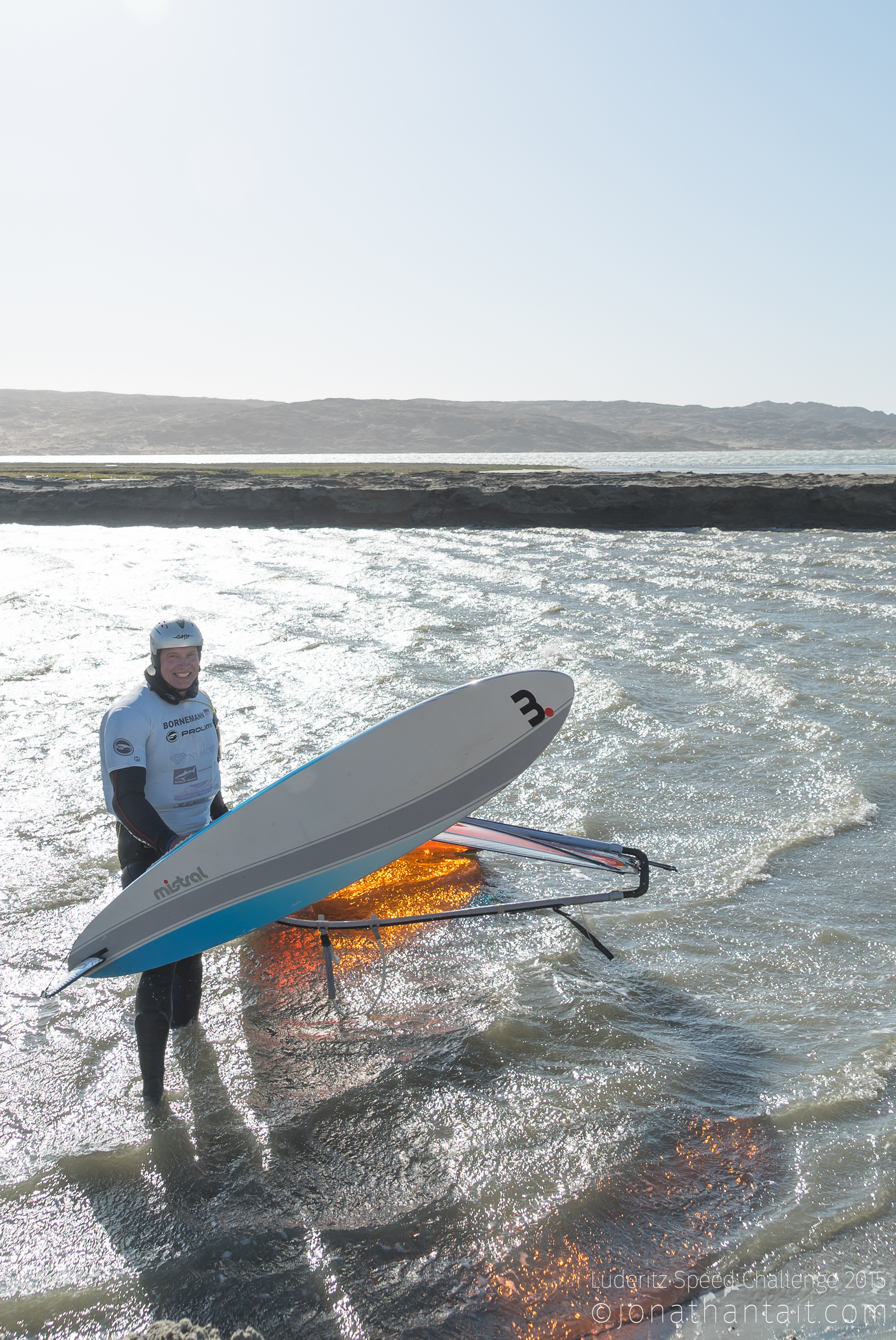
Christian Bornemann after windsurfing

Bornemann grew up in Dortmund and learned to surf at the age of 14. At the age of 13 he came for the first time in contact with windsurfing. He completed his first professional race at the age of 30. He currently lives in Dortmund and works as a dentist.

== Achievements (excerpt) ==
2018

- German record with 38.94 knots/Nautical mile (1852 m)

2015

- Award: Dortmunds Sportler des Jahres
- German record with 50.20 knots/500 meters
- German „GPS" record with 51.05 knots/10 seconds

2014

- German record with 48.82 knots/500 meters
- German „GPS" record with 49.49 knots/10 seconds
- 5th place of the „GPS worldranking"

2012

- German record with 46.75 knots/500 meters
- German „GPS" record with 47.70 knots/10 seconds
- 7th place „Surfer of the Year"

2009

- 4th place of the Speed-Worldranking

2005

- 3rd place ISA/IFCA World Production Board Speed World Championship overall
