= Hans Bornemann =

German painter

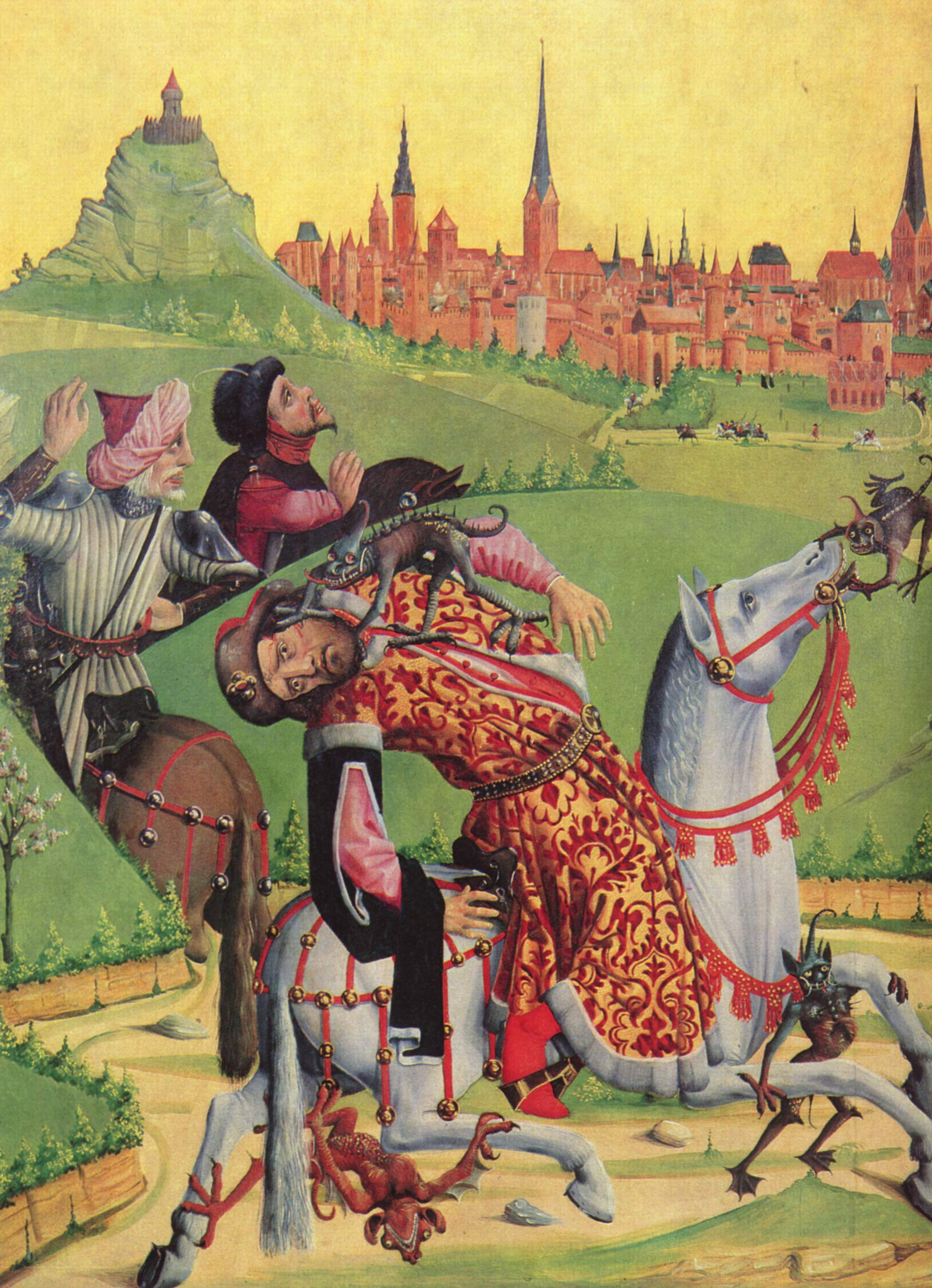
One of the wings of the Altarpiece of St. Nicholas in Lüneburg

Hans Bornemann (active from 1448 - d. 1474) was a late Gothic painter who was active in Hamburg. The earliest written mention of him is a record that he received an inheritance in 1448. He was one of the founders of the Guild of Saint Luke in Hamburg. He was active in the city council of Hamburg, and painted 17 portraits of princes for the Hamburg city hall. After his death his workshop was taken over by Hinrik Funhof, who in 1475 also married Bornemann's widow.

He was also the father of painter Hinrik Bornemann.
