= Agrippina (opera) =

1709 opera seria by G. F. Handel

- Opera by George Frideric Handel
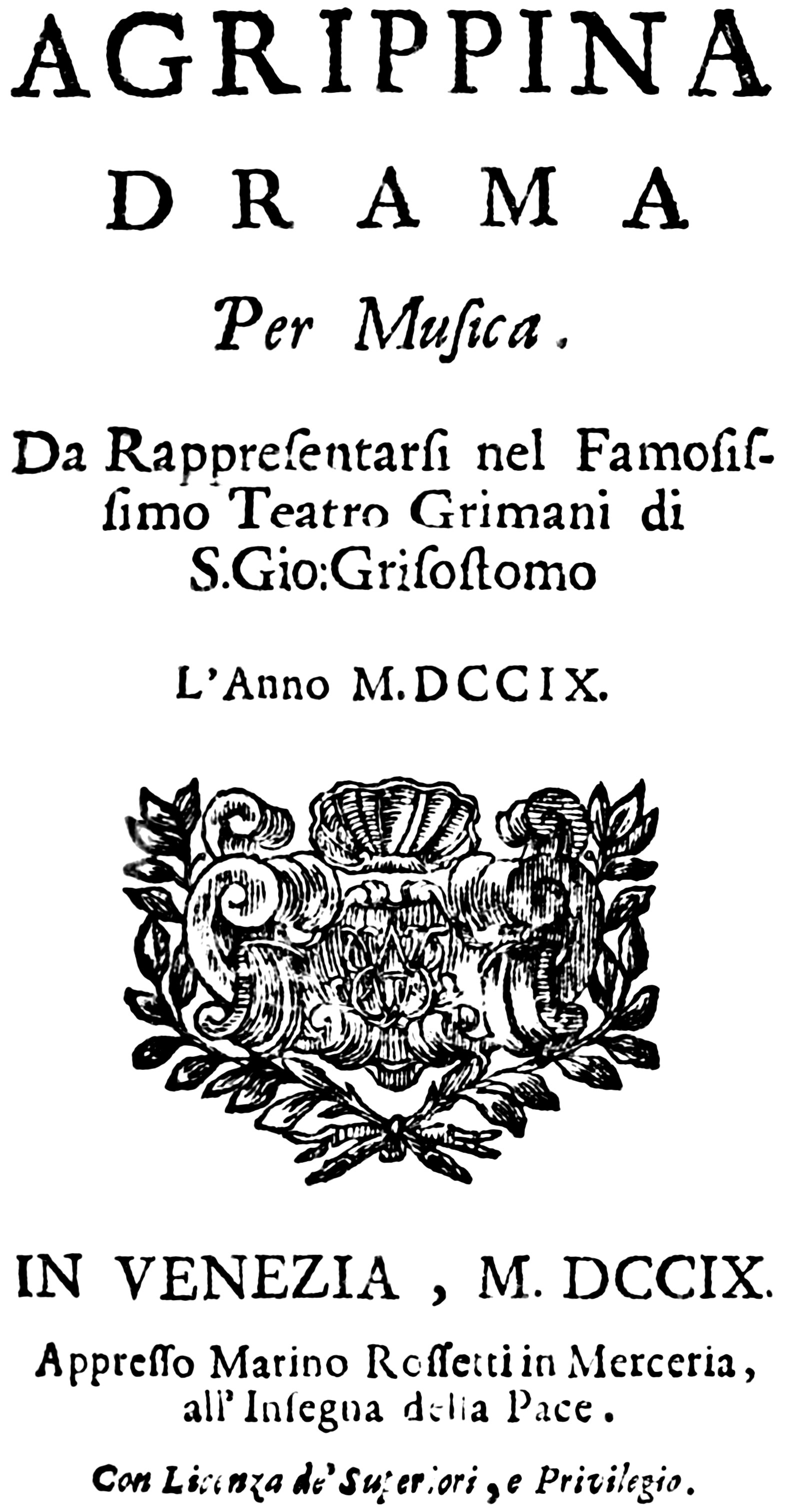
- Title page of original printed edition
- Librettist: Vincenzo Grimani
- Language: Italian
- Based on: life of Agrippina the Younger
- Premiere: 26 December 1709; Teatro San Giovanni Grisostomo, Venice

Agrippina (HWV 6) is an opera seria in three acts by George Frideric Handel with a libretto by Cardinal Vincenzo Grimani. Composed for the 1709–10 Venice Carnevale season, the opera tells the story of Agrippina, the mother of Nero, as she plots the downfall of the Roman emperor Claudius and the installation of her son as emperor. Grimani's libretto, considered one of the best that Handel set, is an "anti-heroic satirical comedy", full of topical political allusions. Some analysts believe that it reflects Grimani's political and diplomatic rivalry with Pope Clement XI.

Handel composed Agrippina at the end of a three-year sojourn in Italy. It premiered in Venice at the Teatro San Giovanni Grisostomo on 26 December 1709. It proved an immediate success and an unprecedented series of 27 consecutive performances followed. Observers praised the quality of the music—much of which, in keeping with the contemporary custom, had been borrowed and adapted from other works, including the works of other composers. Despite the evident public enthusiasm for the work, Handel did not promote further stagings. There were occasional productions in the years following its premiere but Handel's operas, including Agrippina, fell out of fashion in the mid-18th century.

In the 20th century Agrippina was revived in Germany and premiered in Britain and America. Performances of the work have become ever more common, with innovative stagings at the New York City Opera and the London Coliseum in 2007, and the Metropolitan Opera in 2020. Modern critical opinion is that Agrippina is Handel's first operatic masterpiece, full of freshness and musical invention which have made it one of the most popular operas of the ongoing Handel revival.

== Background ==
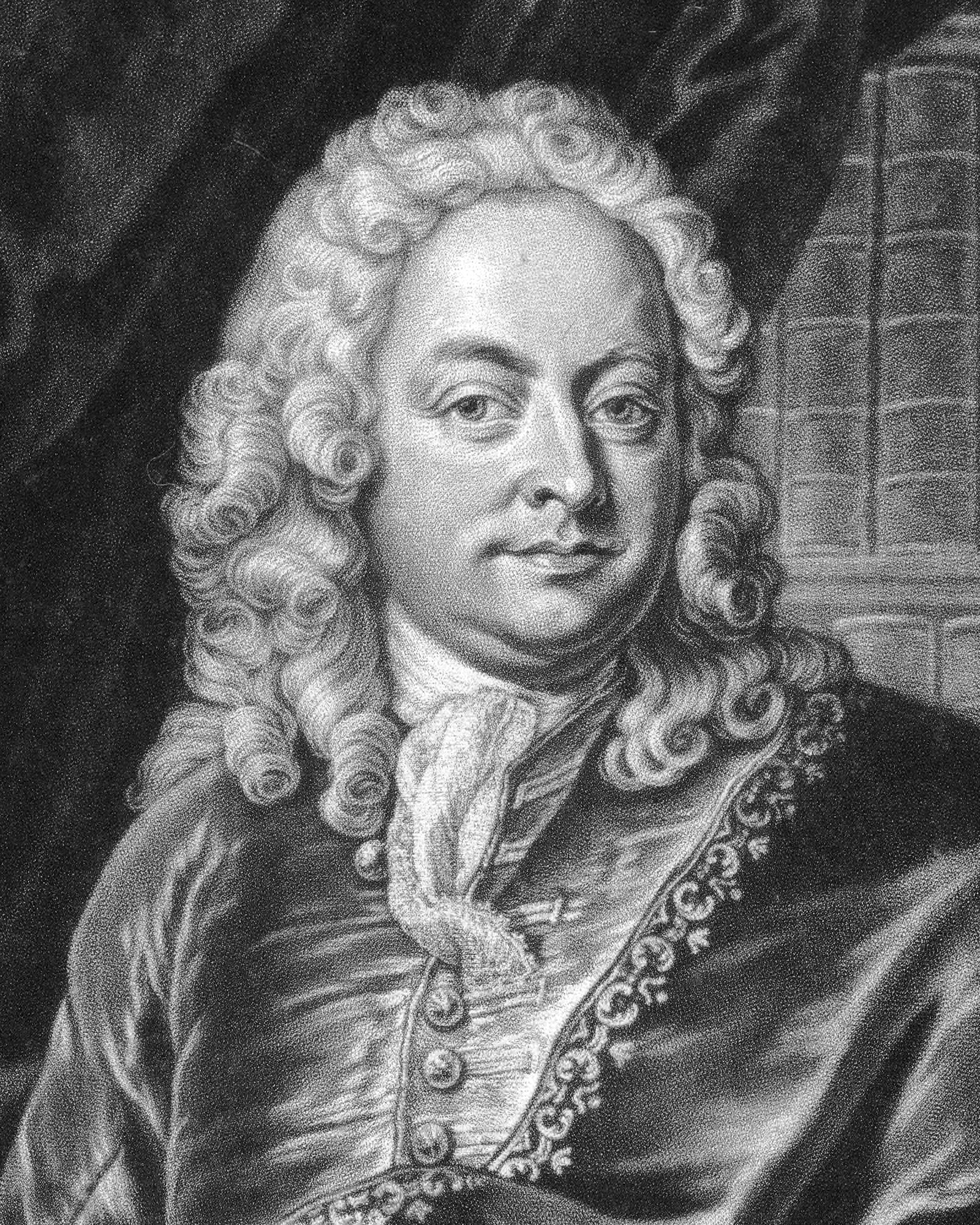
Johann Mattheson of Hamburg, an early influence on Handel's operas

Handel's earliest opera compositions, in the German style, date from his Hamburg years, 1704–06, under the influence of Johann Mattheson. In 1706 he traveled to Italy where he remained for three years, developing his compositional skills. He first settled in Florence where he was introduced to Alessandro and Domenico Scarlatti. His first opera composed in Italy, though still reflecting the influence of Hamburg and Mattheson, was Rodrigo (1707, original title Vincer se stesso ê la maggior vittoria), and was presented there. It was not particularly successful, but was part of Handel's process of learning to compose opera in the Italian style and to set Italian words to music.

Handel then spent time in Rome, where the performance of opera was forbidden by Papal decree, and in Naples. He applied himself to the composition of cantatas and oratorios; at that time there was little difference (apart from increasing length) between cantata, oratorio and opera, all based on the alternation of secco recitative and aria da capo. Works from this period include Dixit Dominus and the dramatic cantata Aci, Galatea e Polifemo, written in Naples. While in Rome, probably through Alessandro Scarlatti, Handel had become acquainted with Cardinal Grimani, a distinguished diplomat who wrote libretti in his spare time, and acted as an unofficial theatrical agent for the Italian royal courts. He was evidently impressed by Handel and asked him to set his new libretto, Agrippina. Grimani intended to present this opera at his family-owned theatre in Venice, the Teatro San Giovanni Grisostomo, as part of the 1709–10 Carnevale season.

== Writing history ==
=== Libretto ===
Grimani's libretto is based on much the same story used as the subject of Monteverdi's 1642 opera L'incoronazione di Poppea. Grimani's libretto centres on Agrippina, a character who does not appear in Monteverdi's darker version. Grimani avoids the "moralizing" tone of the later opera seria libretti written by such acknowledged masters as Metastasio and Zeno. According to the critic Donald Jay Grout, "irony, deception and intrigue pervade the humorous escapades of its well-defined characters". All the main characters, with the sole exception of Claudius's servant Lesbus, are historical, and the broad outline of the libretto draws heavily upon Tacitus's Annals and Suetonius' Life of Claudius. It has been suggested that the comical, amatory character of the Emperor Claudius is a caricature of Pope Clement XI, to whom Grimani was politically opposed. Certain aspects of this conflict are also reflected in the plot: the rivalry between Nero and Otho mirror aspects of the debate over the War of the Spanish Succession, in which Grimani supported the Habsburgs and Pope Clement XI France and Spain.

=== Composition ===
According to John Mainwaring, Handel's first biographer, Agrippina was composed in the three weeks following Handel's arrival in Venice in November 1709, a theory supported by the autograph manuscript's Venetian paper. In composing the opera Handel borrowed extensively from his earlier oratorios and cantatas, and from other composers including Reinhard Keiser, Arcangelo Corelli and Jean-Baptiste Lully. This practice of adapting and borrowing was common at the time but is carried to greater lengths in Agrippina than in almost all of Handel's other major dramatic works. The overture, which is a French-style two-part work with a "thrilling" allegro, and all but five of the vocal numbers, are based on earlier works, though subject in many cases to significant adaptation and reworking.

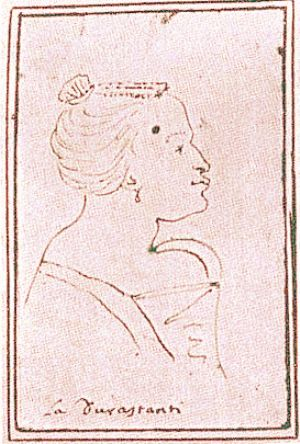
A caricature of Margherita Durastanti, the original Agrippina, from between 1709 and 1712

Examples of recycled material include Pallas's "Col raggio placido", which is based on Lucifer's aria from La resurrezione (1708), "O voi dell'Erebo", which was itself adapted from Reinhard Keiser's 1705 opera Octavia. Agrippina's aria "Non ho cor che per amarti" was taken, almost entirely unchanged, from "Se la morte non vorrà" in Handel's earlier dramatic cantata Qual ti reveggio, oh Dio (1707); Narcissus's "Spererò" is an adaptation of "Sai perchè" from another 1707 cantata, Clori, Tirsi e Fileno; and parts of Nero's aria in act 3, "Come nube che fugge dal vento", are borrowed Handel's oratorio Il trionfo del tempo (all from 1707). Later, some of Agrippina's music was used by Handel in his London operas Rinaldo (1711) and the 1732 version of Acis and Galatea, in each case with little or no change. The first music by Handel presented in London may have been Agrippina's "Non ho cor che", transposed into Alessandro Scarlatti's opera Pirro è Dimitrio which was performed in London on 6 December 1710. The Agrippina overture and other arias from the opera appeared in pasticcios performed in London between 1710 and 1714, with additional music provided by other composers. Echoes of "Ti vo' giusta" (one of the few arias composed specifically for Agrippina) can be found in the air "He was despised", from Handel's Messiah (1742).

One of the main male roles, Nero, was written for a castrato, "the "superstars of their day" in Italian opera. The opera was revised significantly before and possibly during its run. One example is the duet for Otho and Poppaea in act 3, "No, no, ch'io non apprezzo", replaced with two solo arias before the first performance. Another is Poppaea's aria "Ingannata", replaced during the run with another of extreme virtuosity, "Pur punir chi m'ha ingannata", either to emphasise Poppaea's new-found resolution at this juncture of the opera or, as is thought more likely, to flatter Scarabelli by giving her an additional opportunity to show off her vocal abilities.

The instrumentation for Handel's score follows closely that of all his early operas: two recorders, two oboes, two trumpets, three violins, two cellos, viola, timpani, contrabassoon and harpsichord. By the standards of Handel's later London operas this scoring is light, but there are nevertheless what Dean and Knapp describe as "moments of splendour when Handel applies the full concerto grosso treatment". Agrippina, Handel's second Italian opera, was probably his last composition in Italy.

== Roles ==
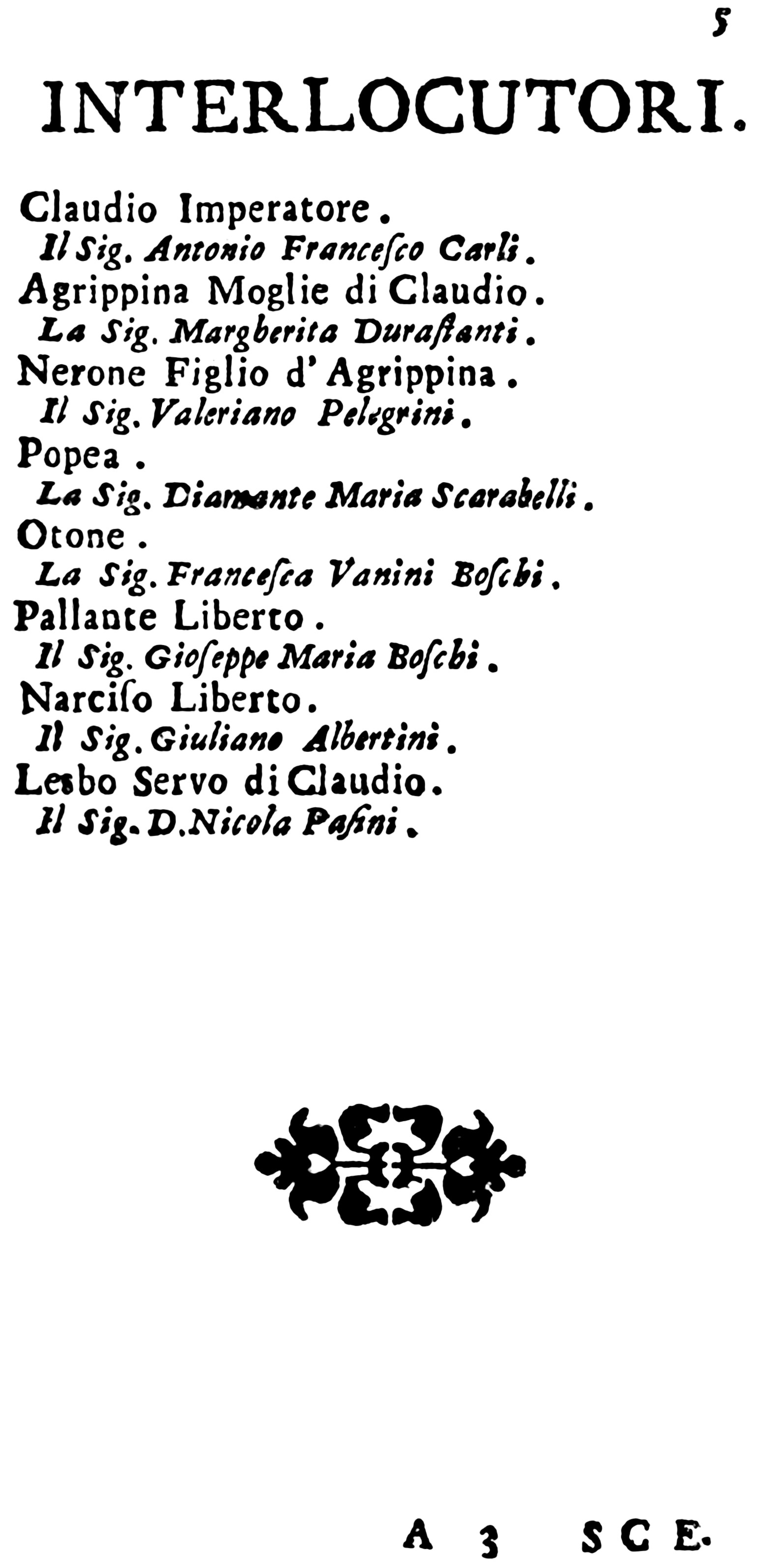
The original casting for Agrippina, as advertised at the time of the first production

Roles, voice types, and premiere cast
Role	Voice type	Premiere cast, 26 December 1709 Conductor: George Frideric Handel
Agrippina	soprano	Margherita Durastanti
Nero (Italian: Nerone)	soprano castrato	Valeriano Pellegrini
Pallas (Pallante)	bass	Giuseppe Maria Boschi
Narcissus (Narciso)	alto castrato	Giuliano Albertini
Lesbus (Lesbo)	bass	Nicola Pasini
Otho (Ottone)	contralto	Francesca Vanini-Boschi
Poppaea (Poppea)	soprano	Diamante Maria Scarabelli
Claudius (Claudio)	bass	Antonio Francesco Carli
Juno (Giunone)	contralto	Francesca Vanini-Boschi

== Synopsis ==
=== Act 1 ===
On hearing that her husband, the Emperor Claudius, has died in a storm at sea, Agrippina plots to secure the throne for Nero, her son by a previous marriage. Nero is unenthusiastic about this project, but consents to his mother's wishes ("Con saggio tuo consiglio"). Agrippina obtains the support of her two freedmen, Pallas and Narcissus, who hail Nero as the new Emperor before the Senate.

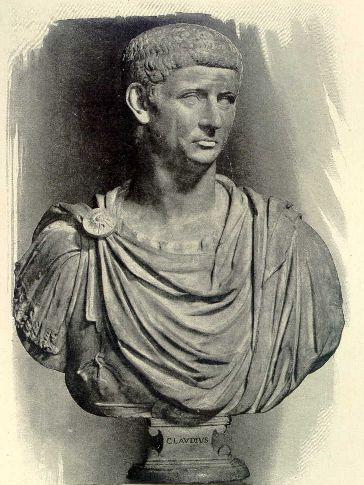
A representation of the Emperor Claudius

With the Senate's assent, Agrippina and Nero begin to ascend the throne, but the ceremony is interrupted by the entrance of Claudius's servant Lesbus. He announces that his master is alive ("Allegrezza! Claudio giunge!"), saved from death by Otho, the commander of the army. Otho himself confirms this and reveals that Claudius has promised him the throne as a mark of gratitude. Agrippina is frustrated, until Otho secretly confides to her that he loves the beautiful Poppaea more than he desires the throne. Agrippina, aware that Claudius also loves Poppaea, sees a new opportunity of furthering her ambitions for Nero. She goes to Poppaea and tells her, falsely, that Otho has struck a bargain with Claudius whereby he, Otho, gains the throne but gives Poppaea to Claudius. Agrippina advises Poppaea to turn the tables on Otho by telling the Emperor that Otho has ordered her to refuse Claudius's attentions. This, Agrippina believes, will make Claudius revoke his promise to Otho of the throne.

Poppaea believes Agrippina. When Claudius arrives at Poppaea's house she denounces what she believes is Otho's treachery. Claudius departs in fury, while Agrippina cynically consoles Poppaea by declaring that their friendship will never be broken by deceit ("Non ho cor che per amarti").

=== Act 2 ===
Pallas and Narcissus realize that Agrippina has tricked them into supporting Nero and decide to have no more to do with her. Otho arrives, nervous about his forthcoming coronation ("Coronato il crin d'alloro"), followed by Agrippina, Nero and Poppaea, who have come to greet Claudius. All combine in a triumphal chorus ("Di timpani e trombe") as Claudius enters. Each in turns pays tribute to the Emperor, but Otho is coldly rebuffed as Claudius denounces him as a traitor. Otho is devastated and appeals to Agrippina, Poppaea, and Nero for support, but they all reject him, leaving him in bewilderment and despair ("Otton, qual portentoso fulmine" followed by "Voi che udite il mio lamento").

However, Poppaea is touched by her former beloved's grief, and wonders if he might not be guilty ("Bella pur nel mio diletto"). She devises a plan and when Otho approaches her, she pretends to talk in her sleep recounting what Agrippina has told her earlier. Otho, as she intended, overhears her and fiercely protests his innocence. He convinces Poppaea that Agrippina has deceived her. Poppaea swears revenge ("Ingannata una sol volta", alternate aria "Pur punir chi m'ha ingannata") but is distracted when Nero comes forward and declares his love for her. Meanwhile, Agrippina, having lost the support of Pallas and Narcissus, manages to convince Claudius that Otho is still plotting to take the throne. She advises Claudius that he should end Otho's ambitions once and for all by abdicating in favour of Nero. Claudius agrees, believing that this will enable him to win Poppaea.

=== Act 3 ===
"Bel piacere", Poppaea's original Act 3 aria
Sung by Alyssa Veteto

Poppaea now plans some deceit of her own, in an effort to divert Claudius's wrath from Otho with whom she has now reconciled. She hides Otho in her bedroom with instructions to listen carefully. Soon Nero arrives to press his love on her ("Coll'ardor del tuo bel core"), but she tricks him into hiding as well. Then Claudius enters; Poppaea tells him that he had earlier misunderstood her: it was not Otho but Nero who had ordered her to reject Claudius. To prove her point she asks Claudius to pretend to leave, then she summons Nero who, thinking Claudius has gone, resumes his passionate wooing of Poppaea. Claudius suddenly reappears and angrily dismisses the crestfallen Nero. After Claudius departs, Poppaea brings Otho out of hiding and the two express their everlasting love in separate arias.

At the palace, Nero tells Agrippina of his troubles and decides to renounce love for political ambition ("Come nube che fugge dal vento"). But Pallas and Narcissus have by now revealed Agrippina's original plot to Claudius, so that when Agrippina urges the Emperor to yield the throne to Nero, he accuses her of treachery. She then claims that her efforts to secure the throne for Nero had all along been a ruse to safeguard the throne for Claudius ("Se vuoi pace"). Claudius believes her; nevertheless, when Poppaea, Otho, and Nero arrive, Claudius announces that Nero and Poppaea will marry, and that Otho shall have the throne. No one is satisfied with this arrangement, as their desires have all changed, so Claudius in a spirit of reconciliation reverses his judgement, giving Poppaea to Otho and the throne to Nero. He then summons the goddess Juno, who descends to pronounce a general blessing ("V'accendano le tede i raggi delle stelle").

== Performance history ==
=== Premiere ===
The date of Agrippina's first performance, about which there was at one time some uncertainty, has been confirmed by a manuscript newsletter as 26 December 1709. The cast consisted of some of Northern Italy's leading singers of the day, including Antonio Carli in the lead bass role; Margherita Durastanti, who had recently sung the role of Mary Magdalene in Handel's La resurrezione; and Diamante Scarabelli, whose great success at Bologna in the 1697 pasticcio Perseo inspired the publication of a volume of eulogistic verse entitled La miniera del Diamante.

Agrippina proved extremely popular and established Handel's international reputation. Its original run of 27 performances was extraordinary for that time. Handel's biographer John Mainwaring wrote of the first performance: "The theatre at almost every pause resounded with shouts of Viva il caro Sassone! ('Long live the beloved Saxon!') They were thunderstruck with the grandeur and sublimity of his style, for they had never known till then all the powers of harmony and modulation so closely arranged and forcibly combined." Many others recorded overwhelmingly positive responses to the work.

=== Later performances ===
Between 1713 and 1724 there were productions of Agrippina in Naples, Hamburg, and Vienna, although Handel himself never revived the opera after its initial run. The Naples production included additional music by Francesco Mancini. In the later 18th, and throughout the 19th centuries, Handel's operas fell into obscurity, and none were staged between 1754 and 1920. However, when interest in Handel's operas awakened in the 20th century, Agrippina received several revivals, beginning with a 1943 production at Handel's birthplace, Halle, under conductor Richard Kraus at the Halle Opera House. In this performance the alto role of Otho, composed for a woman, was changed into a bass accompanied by English horns, "with calamitous effects on the delicate balance and texture of the score", according to Winton Dean. The Radio Audizioni Italiane produced a live radio broadcast of the opera on 25 October 1953, the opera's first presentation other than on stage. The cast included Magda László in the title role and Mario Petri as Claudius, and the performance was conducted by Antonio Pedrotti.

A 1958 performance in Leipzig, and several more stagings in Germany, preceded the British première of the opera at Abingdon, Oxfordshire, in 1963. This was followed in 1982 by the first fully professional production in England. It was performed by Kent Opera with the conductor, Ivan Fischer, making his debut with the company and the orchestra playing on baroque instruments. Felicity Palmer took the title role. In 1983 the opera returned to Venice, for a performance under Christopher Hogwood at the Teatro Malibran. In the United States a concert performance had been given on 16 February 1972 at the Academy of Music in Philadelphia, but the opera's first fully staged American performance was in Fort Worth, Texas, in 1985. That same year it reached New York, with a concert performance at Alice Tully Hall, where the opera was described as a "genuine rarity". The Fort Worth performance was quickly followed by further American stagings in Iowa City and Boston. The historically informed performance movement inspired two period instrument productions of Agrippina in 1985 and 1991 respectively. Both were in Germany, the first was in the Schlosstheater Schwetzingen, the other at the Göttingen International Handel Festival.

=== 21st century revivals ===
There have been numerous productions in the 21st century. There was a fully staged performance at the Glimmerglass Opera in Cooperstown, New York in 2001, conducted by Harry Bicket and directed by Lillian Groag. This production then moved in 2002 to the New York City Opera, revived in 2007, and was described by The New York Times critic as "odd ... presented as broad satire, a Springtime for Hitler version of I, Claudius", although the musical performances were generally praised. In Britain, the English National Opera (ENO) staged an English-language version in February 2007, directed by David McVicar, which received a broadly favourable critical response, although critic Fiona Maddocks identified features of the production that diminished the work: "Music so witty, inventive and humane requires no extra gilding". Some of the later revivals used countertenors in the roles written for castrati. Joyce DiDonato has performed the title role in productions in London at The Royal Opera in 2019 and at the Metropolitan Opera New York in 2020, among other venues.

== Music ==
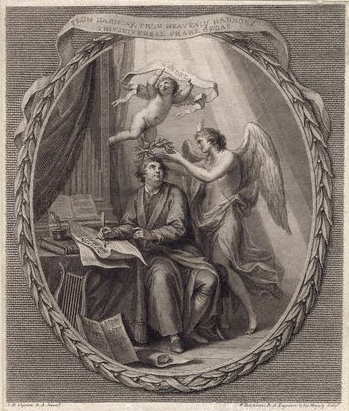
A depiction of Handel receiving a crown of laurels from St Cecilia, patron saint of musicians

Agrippina is considered Handel's first operatic masterpiece; according to Winton Dean it has few rivals for its "sheer freshness of musical invention". Grimani's libretto has also been praised: The New Penguin Opera Guide describes it as one of the best Handel ever set, and praises the "light touch" with which the characters are vividly portrayed. Agrippina as a whole is, in the view of the scholar John E. Sawyer, "among the most convincing of all the composer's dramatic works".

=== Style ===
Stylistically, Agrippina follows the standard pattern of the era by alternating recitative and da capo arias. In accordance with 18th-century opera convention the plot is mainly carried forward in the recitatives, while the musical interest and exploration of character takes place in the arias—although on occasion Handel breaks this mould by using arias to advance the action. With one exception the recitative sections are secco ("dry"), where a simple vocal line is accompanied by continuo only. The anomaly is Otho's "Otton, qual portentoso fulmine", where he finds himself robbed of the throne and deserted by his beloved Poppaea; here the recitative is accompanied by the orchestra, as a means of highlighting the drama. Dean and Knapp describe this, and Otho's aria which follows, as "the peak of the opera". The 19th-century musical theorist Ebenezer Prout singles out Agrippina's "Non ho cor che per amarti" for special praise. He points out the range of instruments used for special effects, and writes that "an examination of the score of this air would probably astonish some who think Handel's orchestration is wanting in variety".

Handel made more use than was then usual of orchestral accompaniment in arias, but in other respects Agrippina is broadly typical of an older operatic tradition. For the most part the arias are brief, there are only two short ensembles, and in the quartet and the trio the voices are not heard together. However, Handel's style would change very little in the next 30 years, a point reflected in the reviews of the Tully Hall performance of Agrippina in 1985, which refer to a "string of melodious aria and ensembles, any of which could be mistaken for the work of his mature London years".

=== Character ===
Of the main characters, only Otho is not morally contemptible. Agrippina is an unscrupulous schemer; Nero, while not yet the monster he would become, is pampered and hypocritical; Claudius is pompous, complacent, and something of a buffoon, while Poppaea, the first of Handel's sex kittens, is also a liar and a flirt. The freedmen Pallas and Narcissus are self-serving and salacious. All, however, have some redeeming features, and all have arias that express genuine emotion. The situations in which they find themselves are sometimes comic, but never farcical—like Mozart in the Da Ponte operas, Handel avoids laughing at his characters.

In Agrippina the da capo aria is the musical form used to illustrate character in the context of the opera. The first four arias of the work exemplify this: Nero's "Con raggio", in a minor key and with a descending figure on the key phrase "il trono ascenderò" ("I will ascend the throne") characterises him as weak and irresolute. Pallas's first aria "La mia sorte fortunata", with its "wide-leaping melodic phrasing" introduces him as a bold, heroic figure, contrasting with his rival Narcissus whose introspective nature is displayed in his delicate aria "Volo pronto" which immediately follows. Agrippina's introductory aria "L'alma mia" has a mock-military form which reflects her outward power, while subtle musical phrasing establishes her real emotional state. Poppaea's arias are uniformly light and rhythmic, while Claudius's short love song "Vieni O cara" gives a glimpse of his inner feelings, and is considered one of the gems of the score.

=== Irony ===
Grimani's libretto is full of irony, which Handel reflects in the music. His settings sometimes illustrate both the surface meaning, as characters attempt to deceive each other, and the hidden truth. For instance, in her aria in Act 1, "Non ho cor che per amarti", Agrippina promises Poppaea that deceit will never mar their new friendship, while tricking her into ruining Otho's chances for the throne. Handel's music illuminates her deceit in the melody and minor modal key, while a simple, emphasised rhythmic accompaniment hints at clarity and openness. In Act 3, Nero's announcement that his passion is ended and that he will no longer bound by it (in "Come nube che fugge dal vento") is set to bitter-sweet music which suggests that he is deceiving himself. In Otho's "Coronato il crin" the agitated nature of the music is the opposite of what the "euphoric" tone of the libretto suggests. Contrasts between the force of the libretto and the emotional colour of the actual music would develop into a constant feature of Handel's later London operas.

== List of arias and musical numbers ==
The index of Chrysander's edition (see below) lists the following numbers, excluding the secco recitatives. Variants from the libretto are also noted.

Act 1

1. Sinfonia
2. "Con saggio tuo consiglio" (Nero)
3. "La mia sorte fortunata" (Pallas)
4. "Volo pronto e lieto il core" (Narcissus)
5. "L'alma mia frà le tempeste" (Agrippina)
6. "Qual piacere a un cor pietoso" (Nero)
7. "Il tuo figlio/La tua prole" (Quartet: Nero, Pallas, Narcissus, Agrippina)
8. "Allegrezza! Allegrezza!" (Lesbus)
9. "Tu ben degno sei dell'allor" (Agrippina)
10. "Lusinghiera mia speranza" (Otho)
11. "Vaghe perle, eletti fiori" (Poppaea)
12. "È un foco quel d'amore" (Poppaea)
13. "Ho un non sò che nel cor" (Agrippina)
14. "Fà quanto vuoi, gli schemi tuoi" (Poppaea)
15. "Pur ritorno a rimirarvi" (Claudius)
16. "Vieni, oh cara" (Claudius)
17. "E quando mai" (Trio: Poppaea, Claudius, Lesbus)
18. "Non ho cor che per amarti" (Agrippina)
19. "Se giunge un dispetto" (Poppaea; there are two settings)

Act 2

20. "Coronato il crin d'alloro" (Otho)
21. "Di timpani e trombe" (Chorus of the principals)
22. "Cade il mondo soggiogato" (Claudius)
23. "Nulla sperar da me" (Agrippina)
24. "Tuo ben è 'l trono" (Poppaea)
25. "Sotto il lauro ch'hai sul crine" (Nero; two settings)
26. Accompagnato: "Otton, qual portentoso fulmine è questo?" (Otho)
27. "Voi che udite il mio lamento" (Otho)
28. "Bella pur nel mio diletto" (Poppaea)
29. "Vaghe fonti, che mormorando" (Otho)
30. "Ti vo' giusta e non pietosa" (Otho)
31. "Ingannata una sol volta" (Poppaea) (The libretto gives "Pur punir chi m'ha ingannata" instead)
32. "Col peso del tuo amor" (Poppaea)
33. "Quando invita la donna l'amante" (Nero)
34. "Pensieri, voi mi tormentate" (Agrippina)
35. "Col raggio placido della speranza" (Pallas)
36. "Spererò, poiché mel dice" (Narcissus)
37. "Basta che sol tu chieda" (Claudius) (Libretto: "Vagheggiar de tuoi bei lumi")
38. "Ogni vento ch'al porto la spinga" (Agrippina)

Act 3

39. "Tacerò pur che fedele" (Otho) (Libretto: "Chi ben ama" (Poppaea))
40. "Coll'ardor del tuo bel core" (Nero) (Libretto: "Esci, o mia vita" (Poppaea))
41. "Io di Roma il Giove sono" (Claudius)
42. "Pur ch'io ti stringa al sen" (Libretto: "No, no, ch'io non apprezzo") (Otho)
43. "Bel piacere e godere fido amor" (Libretto: "Sì, sì ch'il mio diletto")(Poppaea)
44. "Come nube che fugge dal vento" (Nero)
45. "Se vuoi pace" (Agrippina)
46. "Lieto il Tebro increspi l'onda" (Chorus of the principals)
47. "V'accendano le tede i raggi delle stelle" (Juno)

== Recordings ==
Agrippina discography
Year	Cast Claudius, Agrippina, Nero, Poppaea, Otho	Conductor and orchestra	Label
1992	Nicholas Isherwood, Sally Bradshaw, Wendy Hill, Lisa Saffer, Drew Minter	Nicholas McGegan, Capella Savaria	3 CDs: Harmonia Mundi, Cat. No. 907063/5
1997	Alastair Miles, Della Jones, Derek Lee Ragin, Donna Brown, Michael Chance	John Eliot Gardiner, English Baroque Soloists	3 CDs: Philips, Cat. No. 438 009-2; 1991 performance
2000	Günter von Kannen, Margarita Zimmermann, Martine Dupuy, Carmen Balthrop; Bernadette Manca di Nissa	Christopher Hogwood, Orchestra Giovanile del Veneto "Pedrollo" di Vicenza	3 CDs: Mondo Musica, Cat. No. MFOH 10810; 1983 performance
2004	Nigel Smith, Véronique Gens, Philippe Jaroussky, Ingrid Perruche, Thierry Grégoire	Jean-Claude Malgoire, La Grande Ecurie et la Chambre du Roy	3 CDs: Dynamic, Cat. No. CDS431; 2 DVD: Dynamic, Cat. No. 33431
2006	Piotr Micinski, Annemarie Kremer, Michael Hart-Davis, Renate Arends, Quirijn de Lang	Jan Willen de Vriend, Combattimento Consort Amsterdam	2 DVD: Challenge Records (1994), Cat. No. CCDVD 72143; 2004 performance
2011	Marcos Fink, Alexandrina Pendatchanska, Jennifer Rivera, Sunhae Im, Bejun Mehta	René Jacobs, Akademie für Alte Musik Berlin	3 CDs: Harmonia Mundi, Cat. No. HMC952088/90
2015	João Fernandes, Ulrike Schneider, Jake Arditti, Ida Falk Winland, Christopher Ainslie	Laurence Cummings, Festspielorchester Göttingen	3 CDs: Accent Records, Cat. No. ACC26404
2018	Mika Kares, Patricia Bardon, Jake Arditti, Danielle de Niese, Filippo Mineccia	Thomas Hengelbrock, Balthasar Neumann Ensemble	2 DVD: Naxos Records, Cat. No. 2110579-80cat
2020	Luca Pisaroni, Joyce DiDonato, Franco Fagioli, Elsa Benoit, Jakub Józef Orliński	Maxim Emelyanychev, Il Pomo d'Oro	3 CDs:Erato Records, Cat. No. 9029533658

== Editions ==
Handel's autograph score survives, with the Sinfonia and first recitatives missing, but it shows significant differences from the libretto, due to changes made for the first performances. Handel's performing score is lost. Three early manuscript copies, probably dating from 1710, are held in Vienna; one of these may have been a gift from Grimani to the future Emperor Charles VI. These copies, presumably based on the lost performing score, show further changes from the autograph. A manuscript from the 1740s known as the "Flower score" is described by Dean as "a miscellany in haphazard order".

In about 1795 the British composer Samuel Arnold produced an edition based on early copies; this edition, while it contains errors and inaccuracies, has been called "probably a reasonable reflection of early performances". The Chrysander edition of 1874 has a tendency to "sweep Arnold aside when he is right and follow him when he is wrong". Musicologist Anthony Hicks calls it "an unfortunate attempt to reconcile the autograph text with Arnold and the wordbook, the result being a composite version of no authority".

In 1950 Bärenreiter published Hellmuth Christian Wolff's edition, prepared for the 1943 Halle revival and reflecting the casting of basses for Otto and Narcissus, even when they sing what would otherwise be the alto part in the last chorus. It presents a German adaptation of the recitatives and written out embellishments for the da capo arias as well as numerous cuts. The B-flat fugue G 37 appears as an act 2 overture along with other instrumental music.

An edition by John E Sawyer appeared in 2013 as series II vol. 3 of the Hallische Händelausgabe. It is based on the 1709 version, with ballet music borrowed from Rodrigo, and contains two appendices with added and reconstructed music as well as deleted versions from the autograph.
