= Michele Tripisciano =

Italian sculptor (1860 - 1913)

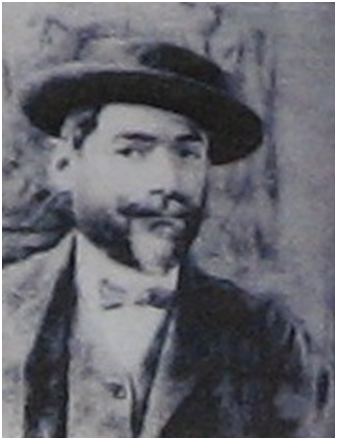
- Young Michele Tripisciano
- Born: Michele Tripisciano; 13 July 1860; Caltanissetta, Sicily
- Died: 21 September 1913 (aged 53); Caltanissetta, Sicily
- Education: St Michael Ospice, Rome
- Known for: Sculpture
- Movement: Realism
- Awards: Order of Saints Maurice and Lazarus

Michele Tripisciano (13 July 1860 – 21 September 1913) was an Italian sculptor.

He was born in Caltanissetta, the son of the potter Ferdinando Tripisciano and Calogera Falci. He started modelling clay when he was a child in his father's jags factory and in 1873 he was sent to study in Rome at the St Michael Ospice thanks to the involvement of the baron Guglielmo Luigi Lanzirotti and Mr Pugliese. Between 1880 and 1888 he worked with Francesco Fabi Altini and in 1884 he obtained the silver medal at the Accademia di San Luca for his work Caio Mario sulle rovine di Cartagine (Gaius Marius on the ruins of Carthage).

He lived in Rome for many years and then returned to his home town when he died at the age of 53 because of a bronchopneumonia.

In 1900, he received the Knight's Cross from king Umberto I of Italy and in 1912 he was awarded a Knight's Cross of the Order of Saints Maurice and Lazarus by Vittorio Emanuele III di Savoia.

== Life and work ==
Tripisciano opened his own sculpting workshop and created mythic sculptures getting inspiration from both religious and historical subjects. He got orders for churches and memorials and after winning some competitions he worked on international basis.

His work, which was influenced by Francesco Fabi Altini, exemplifies neoclassicism together and with that of such contemporaries as Ettore Ximenes, Nicola Civiletti, Domenico Trentacoste and Mario Rutelli, also of contemporary Romano Vio, Francesco Biangardi, Giovanni Duprè, Luigi Fontana, Giovanni Scarfì and others.

== Galleries holding his work ==
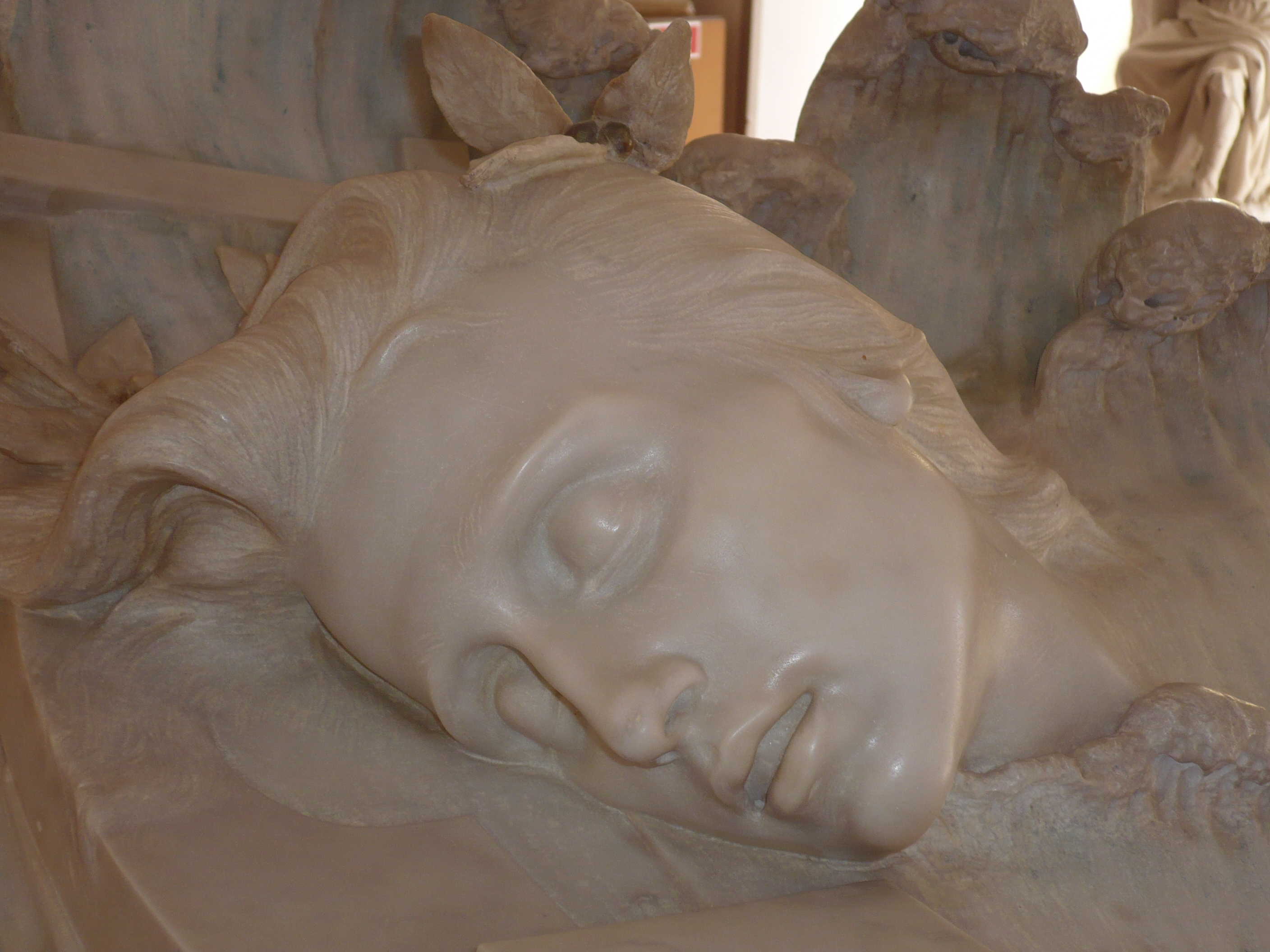
The Orfeo, an early work, exhibited in the Tripisciano Museum in the Moncada Palace in Caltanissetta

A museum dedicated to Tripisciano (Museo Tripisciano), located in the Palazzo Moncada on Largo Barile in Caltanissetta, displays many works, mostly stucco models, from the sculptor donated to the town. Among these is a work in marble, Orfeo. This work is different from the previous ones from the same author because of the particular introspective analysis on the subject.

== List of selected works ==
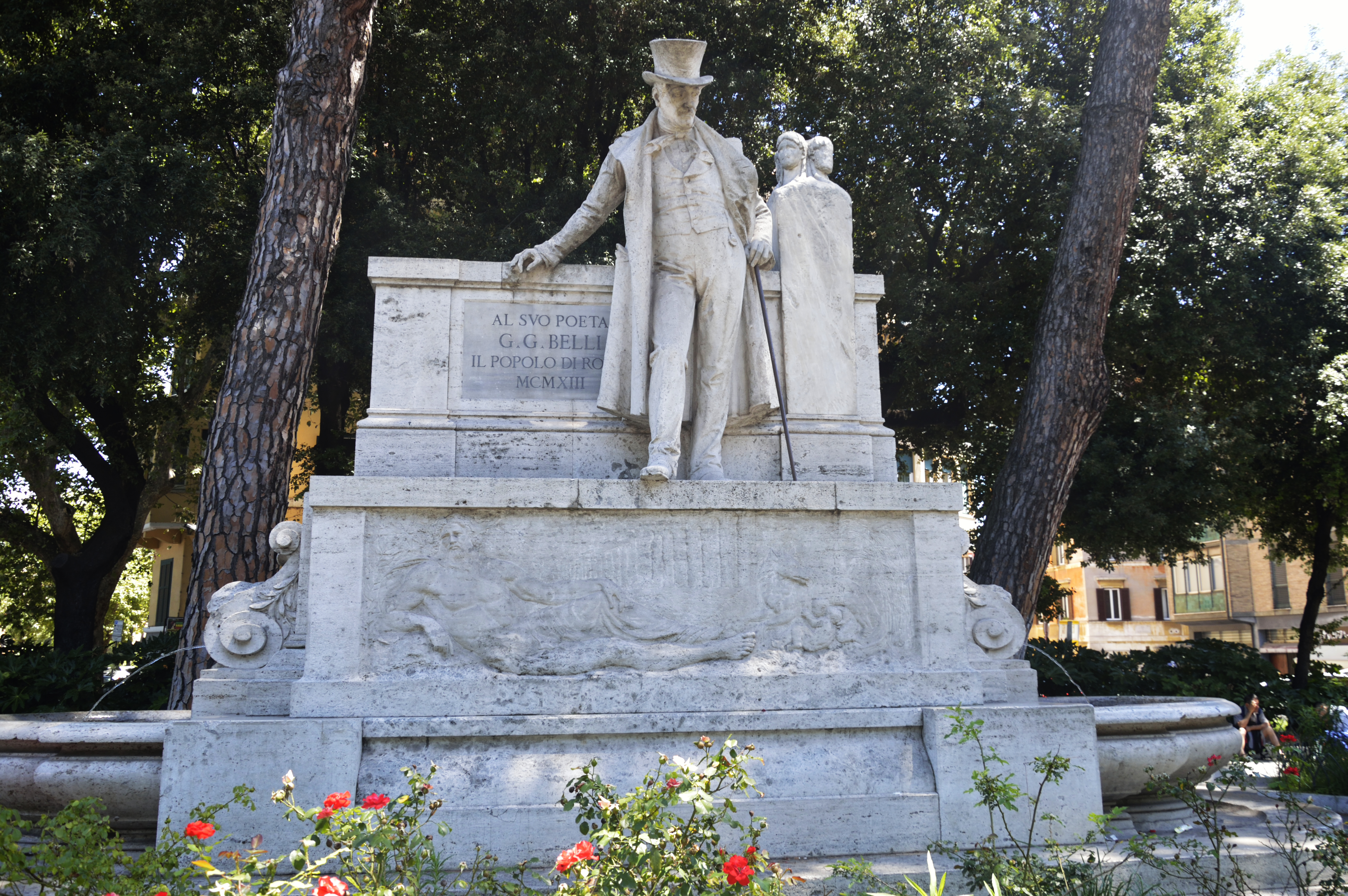
Statue of Belli in Rome

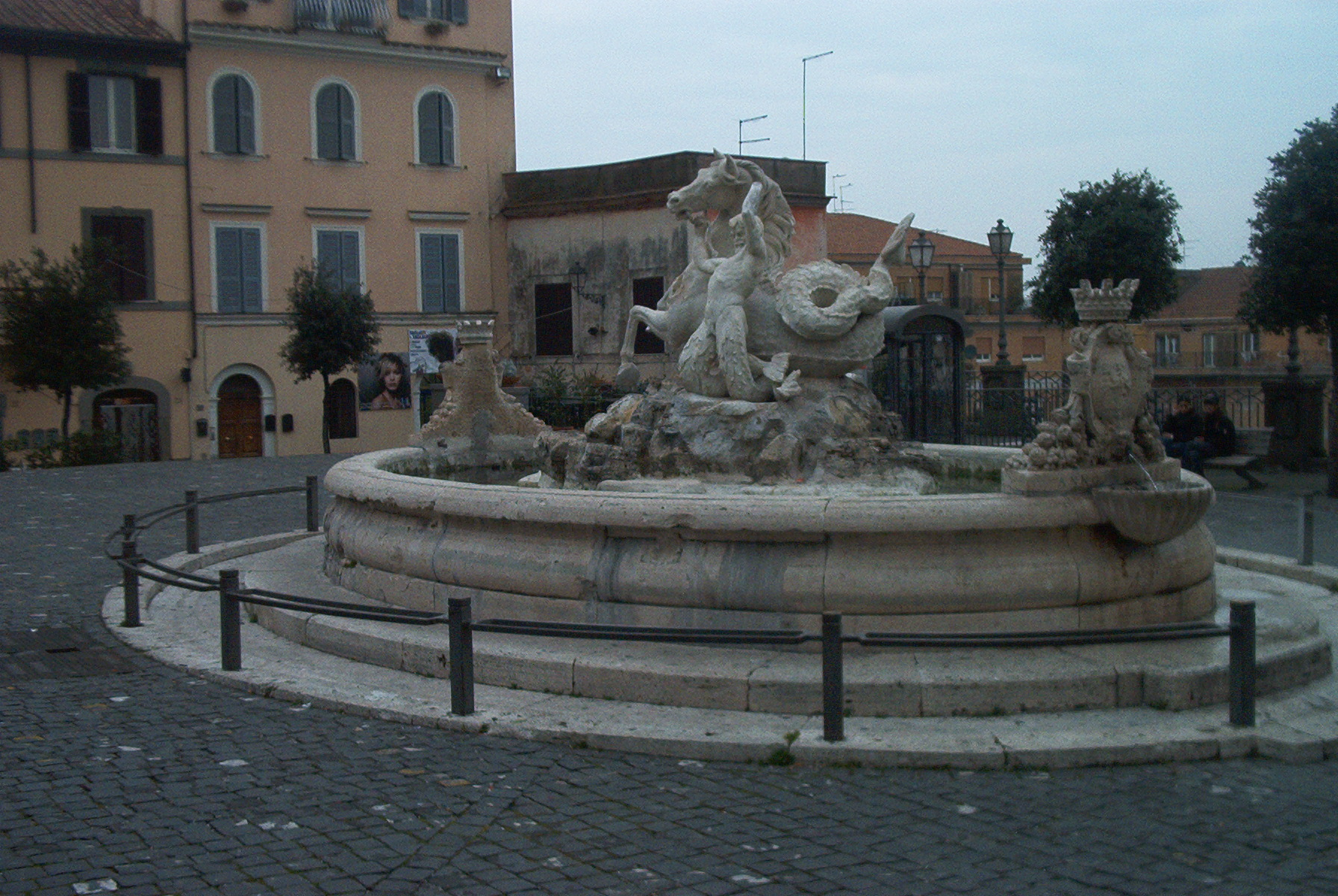
Triton Fountain in Marino

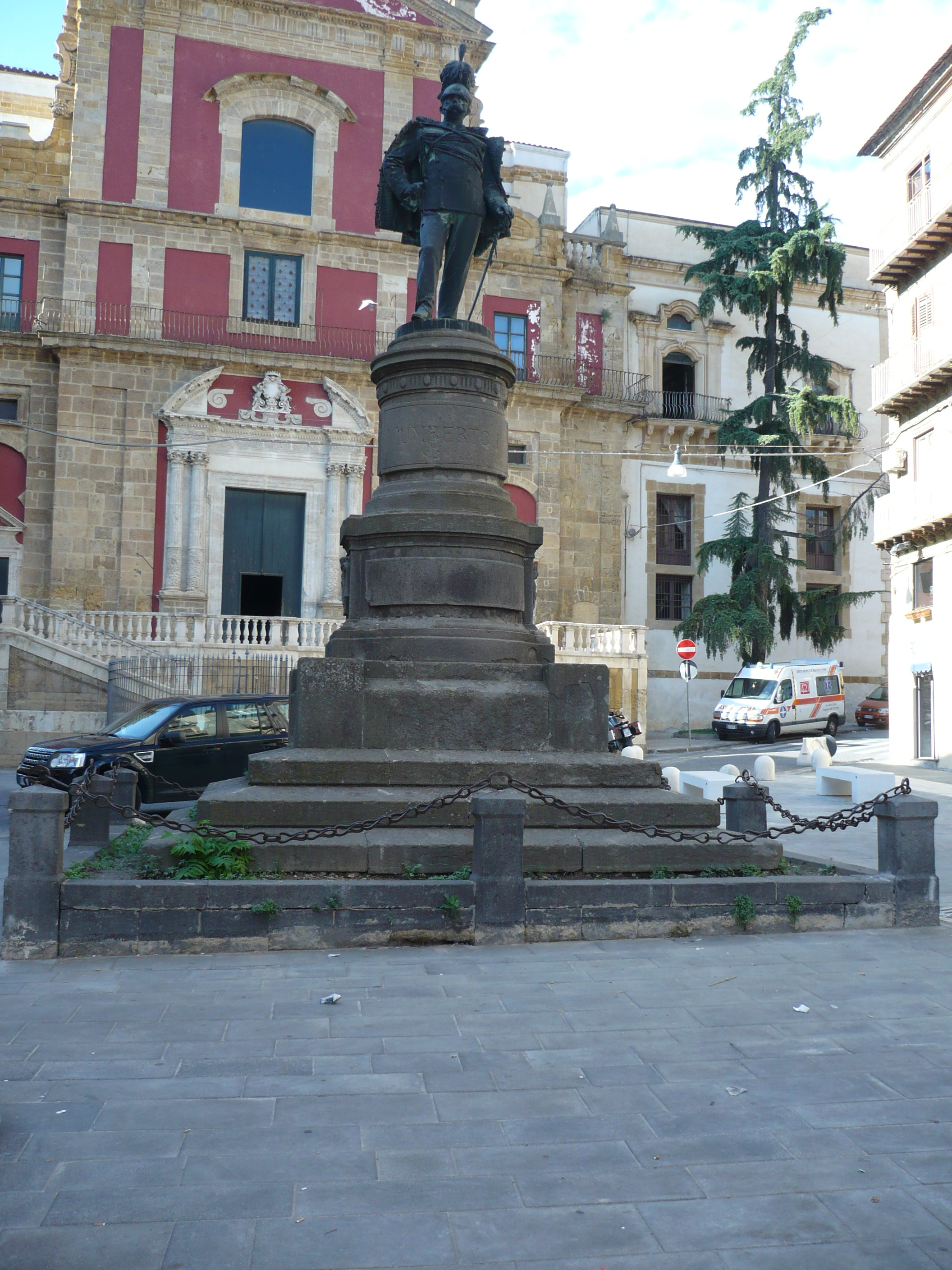
Statue of Umberto I of Italy in Caltanissetta

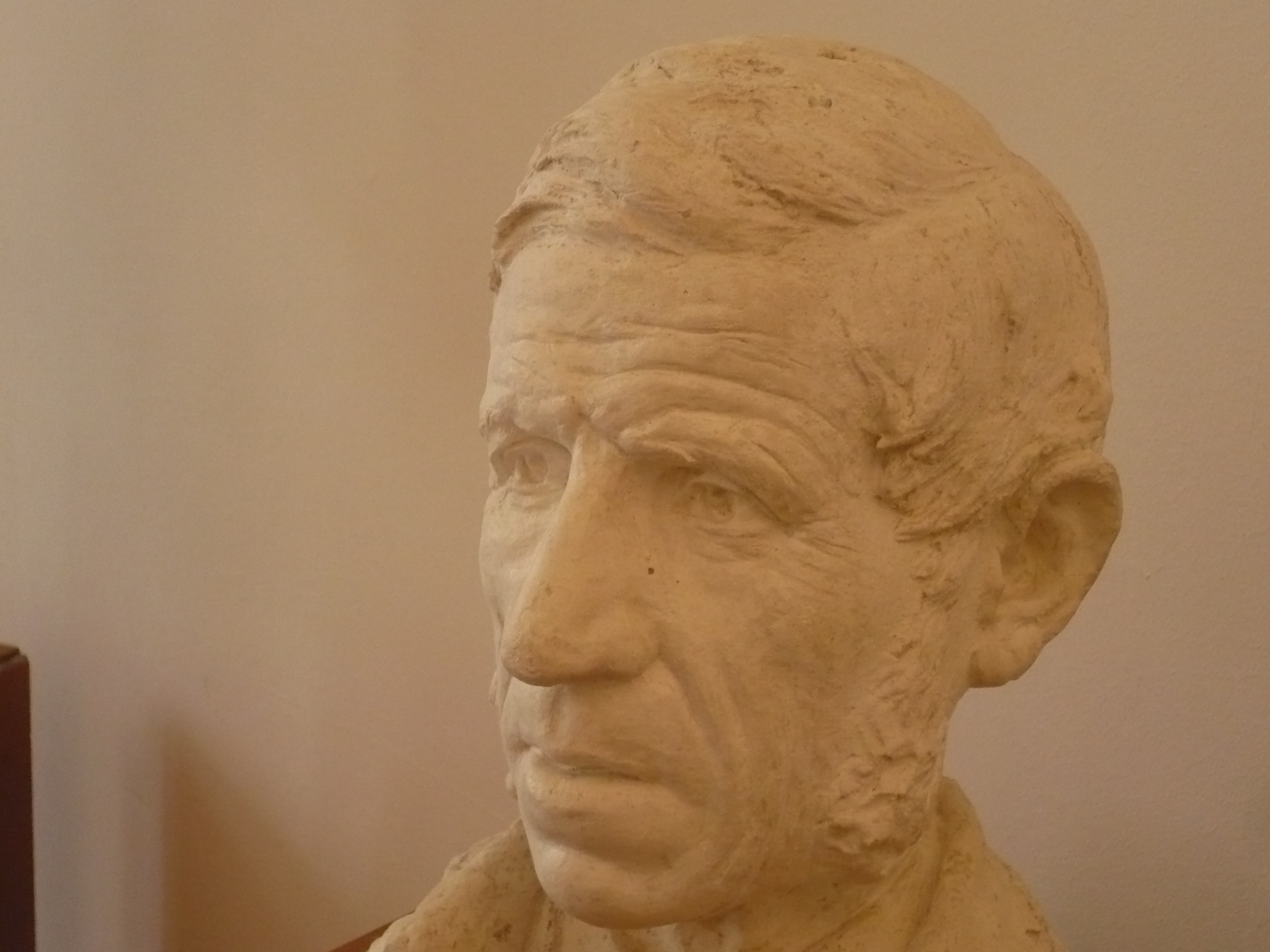
Plaster bust of his father Ferdinand exhibited in the Museum Tripisciano of Palazzo Moncada in Caltanissetta

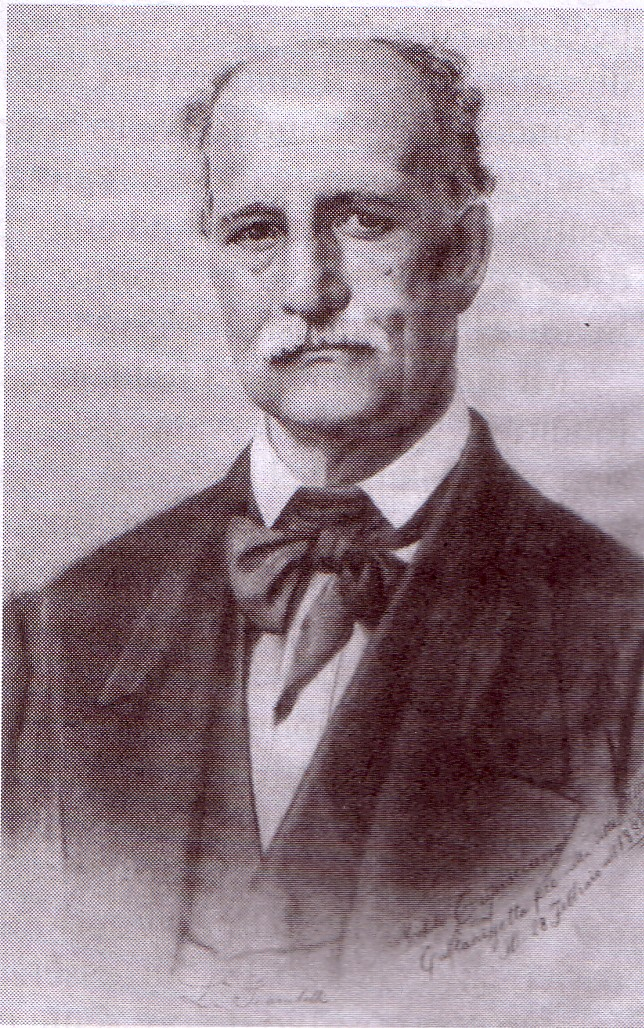
Portrait of Scarabelli in Caltanissetta

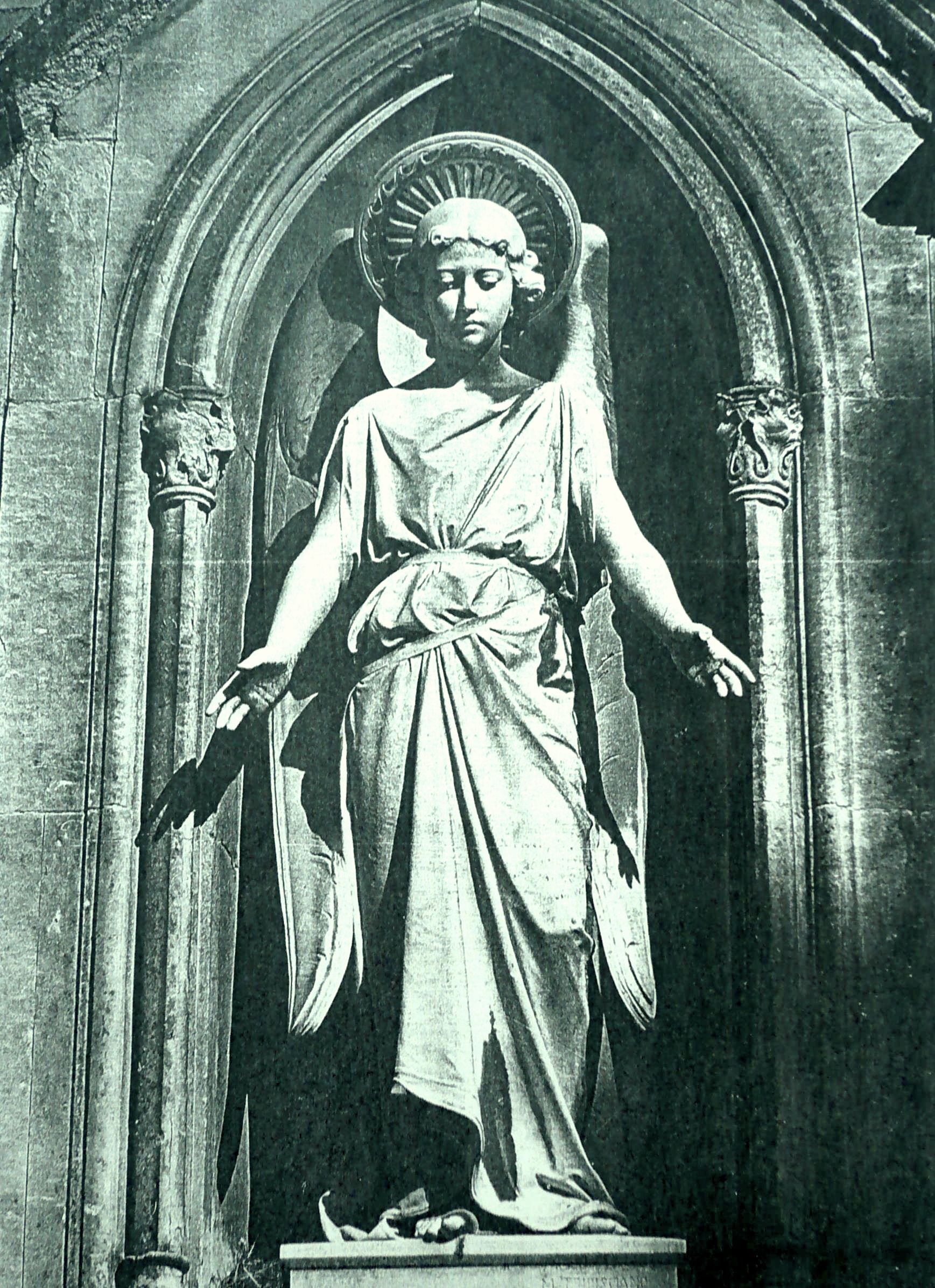
The angel of the Tomb of Testasecca in Caltanissetta of 1894

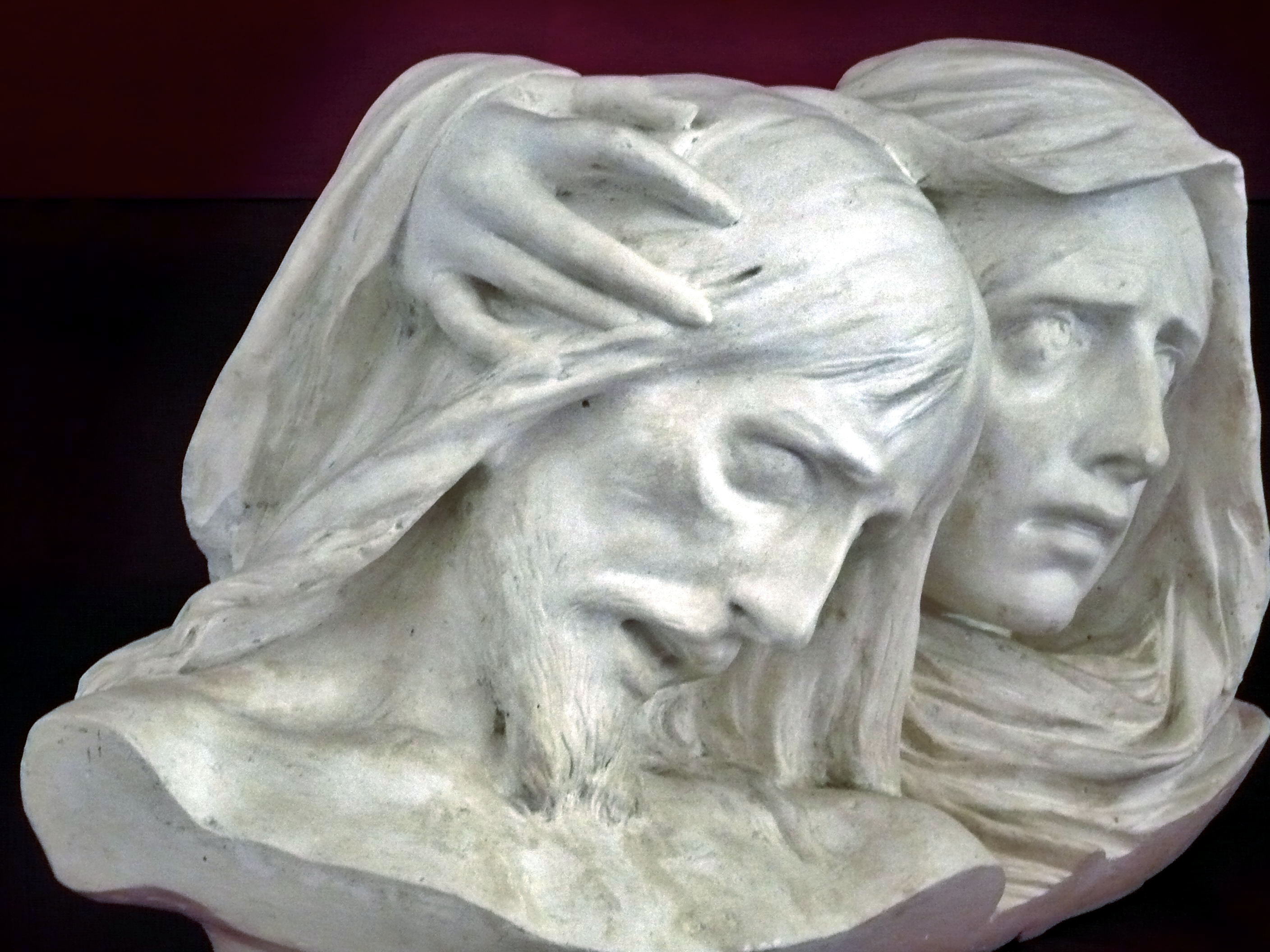
Piety exhibited in the Museum Tripisciano of Palazzo Moncada in Caltanissetta

== See also ==
- Neoclassicism

== Sources ==
- Franco Spena,Michele Tripisciano Archivio Nisseno Anno VII - N. 12 Gennaio-Giugno 2013 Ed. Società Nissena di Storia Patria Caltanissetta 2012 p. 30-179 ISSN 1974-3416
- Salvatore Renna (2012). Tripisciano e Belli un siciliano per Roma. Storia di un monumento. Bonfirraro. ISBN 978-88-6272-052-6.
- Sicilia. Touring Editore. 1989. pp. 490–. ISBN 978-88-365-0350-6.
- Marvin Pulvers (2002). Roman Fountains: 2000 Fountains in Rome. A Complete Collection. L'ERMA di BRETSCHNEIDER. pp. 188–. ISBN 978-88-8265-176-3.
- William Nolan Bruce (2004). Resurveying the religious topography of the Tiber island (MA thesis). University of Florida. OCLC 55898888.
- Archivio storico siciliano: pubblicazione periodica per cura della Scuola di paleografia di Palermo. Stabilimento tipografico Lao. 1913.
- Francesco Gallo; Michele Tripisciano; Marisa Sedita Migliore (1987). Michele Tripisciano. Ediprinteditrice.
- Corrado Augias (7 October 2010). I segreti di Roma. Edizioni Mondadori. ISBN 978-88-520-1028-6.
- Calogero Scarlata, Pittura-Scultura-Arti Minori- Dizionario degli artisti presenti a Caltanissetta e nei Comuni della sua Provincia, Edizione Lussografica di Caltanissetta 1999
- Daniela Vullo, Progetto Scuola Città. Schedatura delle emergenze architettoniche di Caltanissetta, Regione Siciliana, Assessorato regionale dei beni Culturali ed Ambientali e della Pubblica Istruzione, Dipartimento Regionale Beni Culturali, Ambientali ed Educazione Permanente, Area Soprintendenza per i Beni Culturali ed Ambientali di Caltanissetta 2005
- Walter Guttadauria, Viaggio nell’arte di Rosone tra mostri, fontane, vescovi e anche madonne "brutte", La Sicilia 5 aprile 2009
- Walter Guttadauria, Ricerca di identità perdute per non dimenticare i personaggi del passato, La Sicilia 24 maggio 2009
