= Magdalena Kožená =

Czech mezzo-soprano (born 1973)

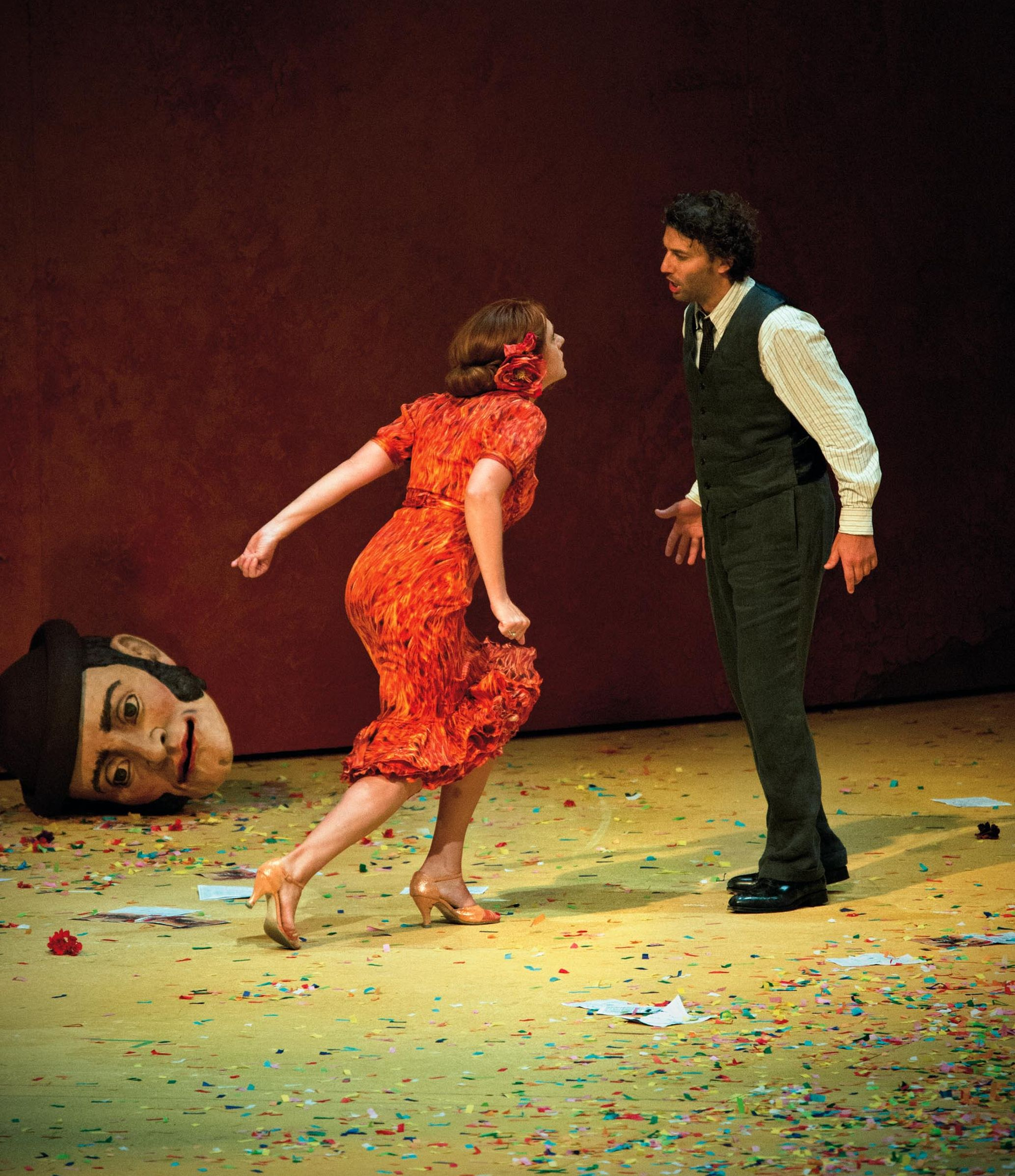
- Magdalena Kožená as Carmen, with Jonas Kaufmann, Salzburg Festival 2012
- Born: 26 May 1973 (age 53); Brno, Czechoslovakia
- Occupation: Operatic mezzo-soprano

Magdalena Kožená (Czech: [ˈmaɡdalɛna ˈkoʒɛnaː]; born 26 May 1973) is a Czech mezzo-soprano.

== Early life ==
Kožená was born in Brno in Czechoslovakia. Both her parents had come originally from Bohemia, to the west. She was born one of the two daughters of a mathematician father and a biologist mother. Her father died when she was eleven. As a child she sang in Kantiléna, the Children's and Youth Choir headed up by Ivan Sedláček and attached to the Brno Philharmonic Orchestra. It was, however, as a professional pianist that she planned to make her career until 1987 when she injured her hand in a sports accident at school: this led her to focus on training for a singing career. From 1987 to 1991 she studied voice at Brno Conservatory with Neva Megová and Jiří Peša, and from 1991 to 1995 she was a student of Eva Blahová at Bratislava Drama College where she graduated in 1995. In 1995, she was a prize winner at the International Mozart Competition. From 1996–97, she was a member of the Vienna Volksoper.

== Career ==
Kožená's first recording was of Bach arias, recorded in the Czech Republic. Upon hearing the recording, Deutsche Grammophon (DG) signed her to a recording contract. Later recordings include Handel's Roman Motets and Italian Cantatas and Messiah with Marc Minkowski for DG/Archiv, and her first solo recital disc (Dvořák, Janáček and Martinů with Graham Johnson – Gramophone Solo Vocal Award, 2001) for Deutsche Grammophon. Further recordings include recitals of arias of Mozart, Gluck and Mysliveček (with the Prague Philharmonia and Michel Swierczewski), of French arias with the Mahler Chamber Orchestra and Minkowski, Gluck's Paride ed Elena under Paul McCreesh, a recital disc with Malcolm Martineau and an acclaimed disc of cantatas by members of the Bach family ("Lamento") with Musica Antiqua Köln and Reinhard Goebel. She received the 2004 Gramophone Awards Artist of the Year. For DG/Archiv, she recorded a disc with opera arias of Handel and one with opera arias by Antonio Vivaldi, both with the Venice Baroque Orchestra conducted by Andrea Marcon. She has also recently begun to record for Pentatone, where her first album featured Simon Rattle on piano, in an album of Dvořák, Janáček, Strauss and Chausson.

=== Concerts and recitals ===
Kožená appears regularly at the Prague Spring and at the Concentus Moraviae Festivals. She has given recitals in London, the Schubertiade Vorarlberg, Brussels, Paris, Hamburg, Amsterdam, Munich, Prague, Tokyo, Yokohama and Sapporo, Carnegie Hall, in San Francisco and in London, Lisbon, Vienna, Copenhagen, Amsterdam, Hamburg and Prague. She also appeared in concerts with the Monteverdi Choir and English Baroque Soloists Bach Cantata Pilgrimage during the year 2000.

=== Opera performances ===
Her operatic engagements have included several notable debuts: at the Théâtre du Châtelet in Paris as Orfeo in Gluck's Orphée, conducted by John Eliot Gardiner; at the Vienna Festival as Nerone in Monteverdi's L'incoronazione di Poppea, conducted by Minkowski; at the Edinburgh Festival as Sesto in Mozart's La clemenza di Tito; at the Leipzig Opera as Mélisande in Debussy's Pelléas et Mélisande, conducted by Minkowski; at the Aix-en-Provence Festival as Cherubino in Mozart's Le nozze di Figaro; at the Dutch National Opera as Cleopatra in Handel's Giulio Cesare; and at the Salzburg Festival as Zerlina in Mozart's Don Giovanni under Nicolaus Harnoncourt. She sang the centenary performance of Pelléas et Mélisande at the Opéra-Comique in Paris under Minkowski and subsequently Cleopatra in Giulio Cesare under Minkowski.

Later engagements include the roles of Idamante in Mozart's Idomeneo at the Glyndebourne and Salzburg Festivals, Cherubino for both the Bavarian State Opera in Munich and the Metropolitan Opera in New York, Dorabella in Mozart's Cosi fan tutte (Salzburg Easter Festival and in Berlin) and her return to the Metropolitan Opera as Varvara (Katja Kabanova) and Dorabella. She sings Zerlina with the Metropolitan Opera in Japan, returns to the Salzburg Festival for Idamante and to the Théâtre des Champs-Elysées for Melisande.

== Personal life ==
Kožená has been married twice. Her first marriage was to the French baritone Vincent le Texier. The marriage ended in divorce after she began a relationship with Simon Rattle. Kožená and Rattle married in 2008 in Brno. The couple has three children.

== Awards ==
- 2001 Gramophone Solo Vocal Award
- 2001 Czech Crystal Award, Golden Prague International Television Festival – Best recording of a concert or stage performance (opera, operetta, ballet, dance, musical), Magdalena Kožená and Thierry Gregoire, Czech Television, Brno Television Studio, Czech Republic
- 2003 Chevalier de l'Ordre des Arts et des Lettres by the French Government
- 2004 Gramophone Awards Artist of the Year
- 2013 Handel Prize
- 2026 Thalia Award Opera

== Recordings ==
- Johann Sebastian Bach: Arias (1997) Archiv Produktion
  - Arias (1999) Archiv Produktion
  - Whitsun Cantatas (2000) Deutsche Grammophon
  - Bachianas: Music by the Bach Family (2012) Archiv Produktion / Deutsche Grammophon
- Handel: Dixit Dominus in G minor (1999) Archiv Produktion
  - Italian Cantatas (2000) Archiv Produktion
  - Ah! Mio Cor: Handel Arias (2007) Archiv Produktion
- Antonio Vivaldi: Juditha triumphans (Highlights) (2000) Naïve Records
  - Juditha triumphans (2001) Opus 111
  - Opera Highlights (2010) Naïve Records
  - Magdalena Kožená Sings Vivaldi (2009) Archiv Produktion
- Gustav Mahler: Des Knaben Wunderhorn; Adagio from Symphony No. 10 (2010) Deutsche Grammophon
  - Das Lied von der Erde (2018) BR Klassik
    - Urlicht, 'Der Mensch liegt in grösster Not'(Alto). Sehr feierlich, aber schlicht; Fourth movement from Symphony No. 2 (2010) Warner Classics
- Jakub Jan Ryba: Czech Christmas Mass; 3 Pastorellas (2007) Archiv Produktion
  - Česká mše vánoční (2017) Universal
- Vítězslav Novák: Piano Quintet; Songs of a Winter Night; 13 Slovak Songs (1999) ASV
- Robert & Clara Schumann: Love's Spring (2021) Challenge Classics
- Jan Dismas Zelenka: I Penitenti al Sepolcro del Redentore (2004) Supraphon
- Christoph Willibald Gluck: Paride ed Elena (2005) Archiv Produktion
- Monteverdi (2016) Archiv Produktion
- Brahms: Lieder & Liebeslieder Waltzes (2016) Deutsche Grammophon
- Claude Debussy: La Mer; Ariettes Oubliées; Gabriel Fauré: Pelléas et Mélisande (2017) Linn / Linn Records
- Claude Debussy: Nocturnes; Maurice Duruflé: Requiem (2019) Linn Records
- Wolfgang Amadeus Mozart: Arias (2006) Archiv Produktion
- Bohuslav Martinů: Three Fragments from the opera Juliette (2009) Supraphon
- Georges Bizet: Carmen (2012) EMI Classics / Warner Classics
- Cole Porter (2018) Brnofon
- Maurice Ravel; Henri Duparc: Aimer et mourir - Danses et mélodies (2018) Linn Records
- Love Songs (2000) Deutsche Grammophon
- Le Belle Immagini (2002) Deutsche Grammophon
- French Arias (2003) Deutsche Grammophon
- In Recital (2004) Deutsche Grammophon
- Lamento (2005) Archiv Produktion
- Enchantment (2006) Deutsche Grammophon
- Songs My Mother Taught Me (2008) Deutsche Grammophon
- Lettere Amorose (2010) Deutsche Grammophon
- Love and Longing (2012) Deutsche Grammophon
- 3 Classic Albums (2014) Deutsche Grammophon
- Prayer: Voice & Organ (2014) Deutsche Grammophon
- Il Giardino dei sospiri (2019) PentaTone Classics
- Soirée – Magdalena Kožená & Friends (2019) PentaTone Classics
- Nostalgia: Brahms, Mussorgsky, Bartók (2021) PentaTone Classics
- Musica Viva, Vol. 38: Ondřej Adámek - Follow Me; Where Are You? (2022) BR Klassik
- Folk Songs (2023) - PENTATONE
- Handel: Alcina (2024) - PENTATONE
- Czech Songs (2024) - PENTATONE
