= Scarabelli =

Scarabelli is an Italian surname. Notable people with the surname include:

- Diamante Maria Scarabelli (1675–1754), Italian soprano singer of the late 17th century and the early 18th century
- Giuseppe Scarabelli (1820–1905), Italian geologist, palaeontologist and politician
- Luciano Scarabelli (1806–1878), Italian writer, historian, and politician
- Michele Scarabelli (born 1955), Canadian actress
