= Antonio Francesco Carli =

Italian opera singer

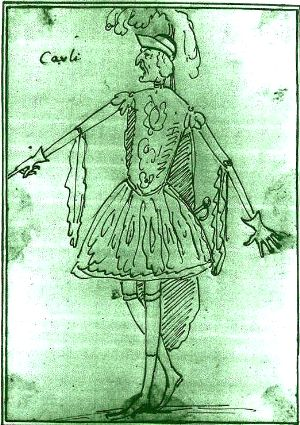
A caricature of Carli.

Antonio Francesco Carli (fl. 1706–23) was an Italian bass singer, primarily of operatic roles. He is best remembered for having sung the role of Claudius in the original production of George Frideric Handel's early success Agrippina. Carli sung in many different Italian cities, including Rome, Bologna, Turin, and Florence, though he primarily worked at Venice between 1706–1718 and 1722–1723. The part of Claudius demands a bass possessed of an exceptionally wide tessitura and one who is able to perform sudden leaps of vocal register. It is possible that an extremely difficult cantata, Nell'Africane selve, which requires a range of C-sharp below the staff (C♯2) to A-natural above it (A4), was composed by Handel for Carli.
