= Francesca Vanini-Boschi =

Italian opera singer

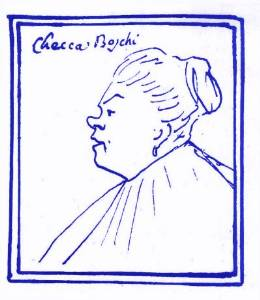
A caricature of Vanini-Boschi.

Francesca Vanini-Boschi (died 1744) was an Italian contralto singer of the 18th century. She is best remembered for her association with the composer George Frideric Handel, for whom she sang both in Italy and in London.

Vanini was born in Bologna, Papal States. As well as singing for Handel, she also sang in operas by Alessandro Scarlatti and Giovanni Bononcini. She frequently sang alongside her husband, the bass Giuseppe Maria Boschi. Her two Handel roles were those of Otho in Agrippina and Goffredo in Rinaldo; these roles use only a limited range and tessitura. After Rinaldo her voice began to decline, but earlier Giuseppe Felice Tosi had praised her for her ability to introduce "Graces without transgressing against Time". She died in Venice.
