= Vincenzo Grimani =

Italian cardinal, diplomat and opera librettist

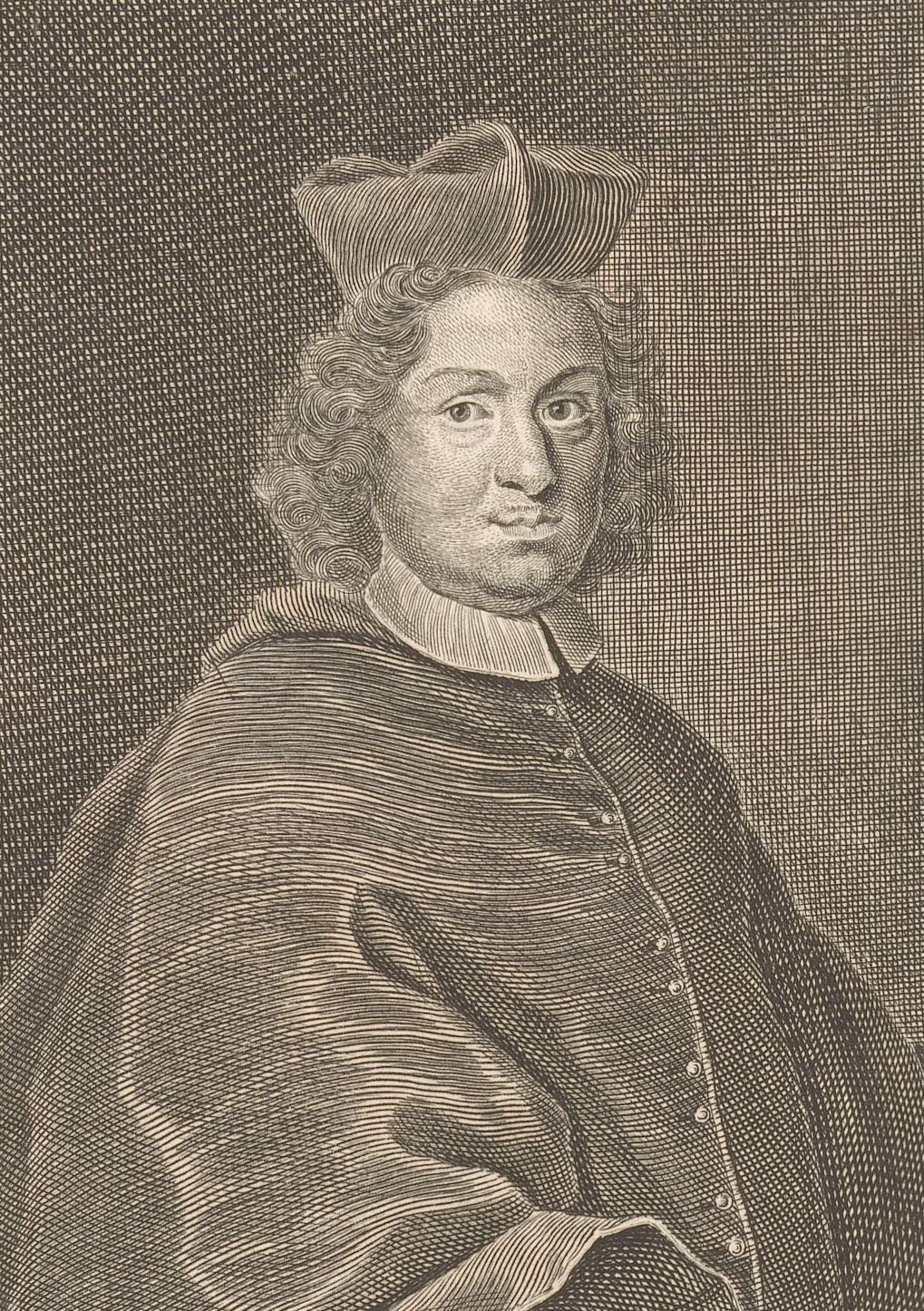
Engraved portrait by Martin Bernigeroth

Vincenzo Grimani (15 May 1652 or 26 May 1655 – 26 September 1710) was an Italian cardinal, diplomat, and opera librettist.

== Biography ==
Grimani was born either in Venice or Mantua. He is best remembered for having supplied the libretto for George Frideric Handel's early operatic success Agrippina, although he also supplied libretti for Elmiro re di Corinto, by Carlo Pallavicino, and Orazio by G. F. Tosi. All the operas were produced at the Teatro S Giovanni Grisostomo, which he owned, while the remainder of his family owned several other Venetian opera houses.

Politically he was allied to the Habsburg cause, and this alliance and his importance diplomatically to the Habsburgs led to him being made a cardinal in 1697. In 1708, he further received the honour of viceroyalty at Naples, where he died.

His libretti are markedly different from the later moralizing tone of Metastasio and Apostolo Zeno, whose ideas came to dictate opera seria. His libretto for Agrippina is marked out by its amorality and the domination of aria over recitative. His portrayal of the Emperor Claudius has been perceived as an oblique attack on the character of Pope Clement XI. Grimani frequently clashed with Clement in the course of protecting the interests of the Habsburgs at the Vatican.
