= Diamante Maria Scarabelli =

Italian opera singer

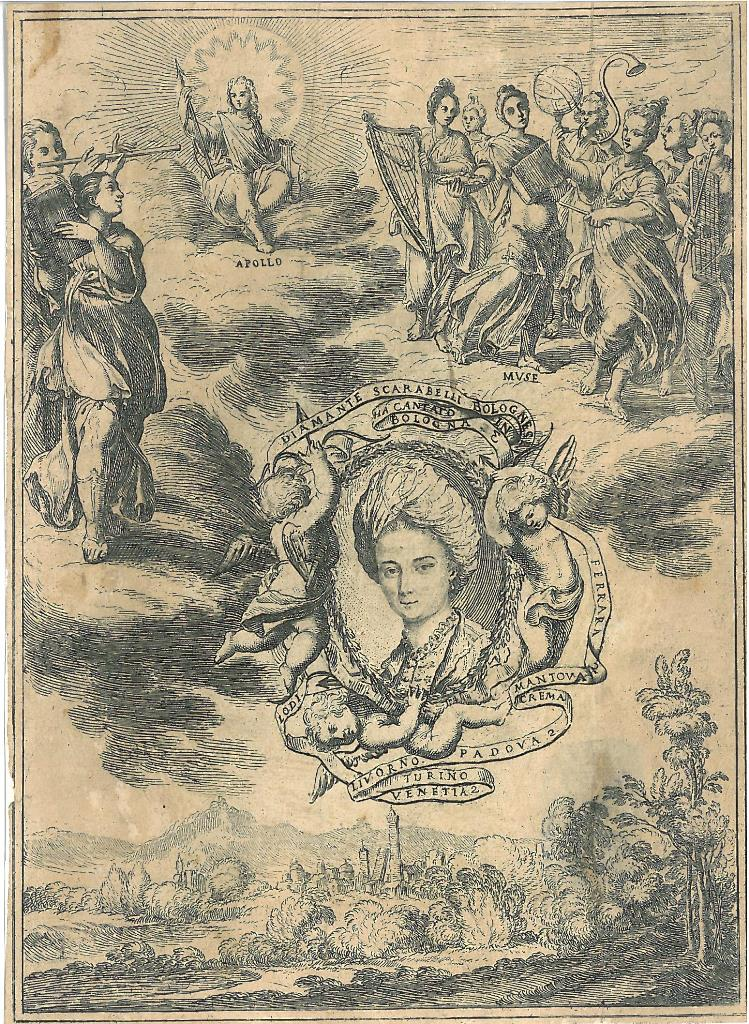
Apotheosis of Scarabelli, flanked by Apollo and the Muses

Diamante Maria Scarabelli (October 6, 1675, Bologna, Papal States - April 5, 1754, Bologna) was an Italian soprano of the later 17th century and the early 18th century. She is best remembered for having sung the part of Poppea in the premiere of George Frederic Handel's opera Agrippina, a role that requires a wide vocal range, a fairly high tessitura, and a highly developed virtuoso technique. Her great success at Bologna in the 1697 pasticcio Perseo inspired the publication of a volume of eulogistic verse, entitled "La miniera del Diamante".
