= Concentus Moraviae =

International music festival

Concentus Moraviae is an annual international classical, jazz and folk music festival held in the towns of the Vysočina and South Moravian regions of the Czech Republic. The festival consists of more than thirty concerts across 13 towns with the subtitle of "Bohemian Dreams" in the churches, castles, and castle courtyards of the Czech towns.

Concentus Moraviae has taken place every year since 1996 with every second festival focusing on Early music.
