= Giovanni Scarfì =

Italian sculptor

Giovanni Scarfi (Fano Superiore, near Messina, Kingdom of the Two Sicilies, November, 1852 – Messina, 1926) was an Italian sculptor.

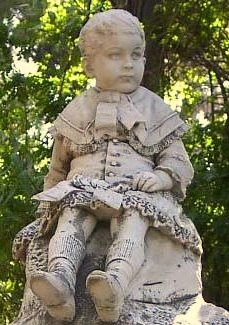
Funeral Monument to Francesco Augusto Marangolo.

== Biography ==
In 1862, he completed his first studies at the orphanage at Messina; then worked at the local arts and craft school at the Instituto Cappellini. With a stipend from the city of Messina, he travels to Rome to study under Giulio Monteverde and Girolamo Masini, as well as at the Academy of St Luke and the Circolo Artistico. Many of his works are funerary monuments in the Camposanto of Messina, including a marble statue of the lawyer Francesco Sasia; Marble Statue of a child: portrait of Francesco Augusto Marangolo; marble statue of a praying angel that decorates the monument of cavalier Lovecchio; marble statue of a flying angel for the tomb of a child; a marble monument with statues of Signor Vollano and his wife; and the marble monument for Signor Garufi and his wife with the Angel of Love.

Other principal works are: a stucco model of Alfredo Cappellini; a marble monument of the Banker cavalier Patrizio Rizzotti with a statue depicting Hope, and a bas-relief representing the family; and six half figures in marble, representing the apostles John, Peter, Bartholemew, Phillip, Simon, and Matthew, completed in a contest held by the City of Catania, the other six Apostles were completed by the sculptor Bagnasco di Palermo of Catania. Scarfi also completed two round bas reliefs depicting Faith and Charity in the Chapel of the Baroness Nava in the Camposanto of Catania; he made many half-busts in marble and bronze of prominent persons and patrons; a bust in marble of general Garibaldi for the villa Bellini di Catania; and a marble bust of King Umberto for the Council Hall of the Chamber of Commerce of Messina.

At the Expositions of Messina he has gained the first prize; he was named to the Commission of Antiquities and Fine Arts; honorary associate of the Accademia Pesoritana, and professor of plastics at the Società Operaia.
