= Thierry Grégoire =

French countertenor

- Thierry Grégoire in 2013
- Occupation: Countertenor

Thierry Grégoire (Charleville-Mézières) is a French countertenor.

== Biography ==
Gregoire studied at the Ecole Nationale De Musique - Charleville Mezieres, where he won 1st Prize in the class of Mme Josette Barreaud. He also studied under James Bowman, Paul Esswood, Henri Ledroit, Margreet Honig and Hubert Weller. At the suggestion of Henri Ledroit he auditioned as a singer in Le Bourgeois Gentilhomme by Molière and Lully at Comédie Francaise. He went on to sing in over 350 performances of the work. He then came to the attention of conductors such as Jean-Claude Malgoire, Christophe Rousset, Jonathan Darlington, and Marc Minkowski. Under Minkowski he has sung the title role in Alessandro Stradella's oratorio San Giovanni Battista, performed in Handel's Dixit Dominus and Monteverdi's L'incoronazione di Poppea as well as singing the role of Coryphée in Minkowski's 1999 recording of Gluck's Armide.

Amongst the music festivals where he has appeared are the Aix-en-Provence Festival, Festival de Beaune, Festival d'Île-de-France (Paris), Festival d’Art Sacré de la Ville de Paris, and the Wiener Festwochen (Vienna). He also appeared on the international stage in productions in New York City, Vienna, Amsterdam, Tokyo, Paris as well as in concerts in Europe, Morocco, India, and Australia.

In 2003 he appeared in a series of recitals in Europe with the mezzo-soprano Magdalena Kožená. In March 2004, the French music magazine Classica featured him as a Classica RTL young talent and included the RTL Discoveries CD Thierry Gregoire chante Vivaldi et Haendel. Since 2005 Gregoire has also been a voice teacher at Ecole Nationale De Musique - Charleville Mezieres.

== Awards ==
- 1998 Prize winner - International Competition "Giovan Battista Velluti" - New Voices for Opera
- 2001 Czech Crystal Award, Golden Prague International Television Festival - Best recording of a concert or stage performance (opera, operetta, ballet, dance, musical), Magdalena Kožená and Thierry Gregoire Česká televize, Brno Television Studio, Czech Republic

== Quotes ==
- "Thierry Gregoire has a rich, deep and moving mezzo voice" - Le Monde de la musique

== Discography ==
- CD
  - Monteverdi - Orfeo (Pastore) - Conductor: Jean-Claude Malgoire
  - Haendel - Agrippina (Ottone) - Conductor: Jean-Claude Malgoire
  - Vivaldi - Tito Manlio (Decio) - Conductor: Federico Maria Sardelli
  - Vivaldi - Orlando Furioso (Ruggiero) - Conductor: Federico Maria Sardelli
  - Gluck - Armide Conductor: Marc Minkowski
  - Lully - Acis et Galatée - Conductor: Marc Minkowski
  - Cavalli - Requiem - Conductor: Françoise Lasserre
  - Palestrina - Madrigaux - Conductor: Françoise Lasserre
  - Cavanna - Raphael, reviens!
- DVD
  - Monteverdi - Incoronazione di Poppea - Conductor: Marc Minkowski, (Aix-en-Provence Festival)
  - Handel - Agrippina (Ottone) - Conductor: Jean-Claude Malgoire
  - Monteverdi - Orfeo (Pastore) - Conductor: Jean-Claude Malgoire
