= Hellmuth Christian Wolff =

German composer and musicologist

Hellmuth Christian Wolff (23 May 1906, in Zürich – 1 July 1988, in Leipzig) was a German composer and musicologist. As a young man he studied music in Berlin and Kiel. He later taught music in Leipzig from 1954-1971. He is particularly remembered for his numerous publications on the history of opera and in particular the subject of baroque opera. Also of interest are his writings on the visual aspects of music which led him to study iconography, including a pictorial history of opera.

Wolff’s reputation rests on his many publications rather than on his compositions which were rarely performed. He composed four operas: Der kleine und der grosse Klaus (1931, revised 1940), Die törichten Wünsche (1943), Der Tod des Orpheus (1947), and Ich lass' mich scheiden (1950), and wrote a ballet and several orchestral and chamber works. He also became known as a painter later in life.

== Bibliography ==
- Oper: Szene und Darstellung von 1600 bis 1900. Musikgeschichte in Bildern. IV: Musik der Neuzeit 1 (Leipzig: VEB Deutscher Verlag für Musik, 1968).

== Sources ==
- Horst Seeger/Andrew Clark. The New Grove Dictionary of Opera, edited by Stanley Sadie (1992). ISBN 0-333-73432-7 and ISBN 1-56159-228-5
