= Giuseppe Scarabelli =

Italian geologist, paleontologist, and politician (1820–1905)

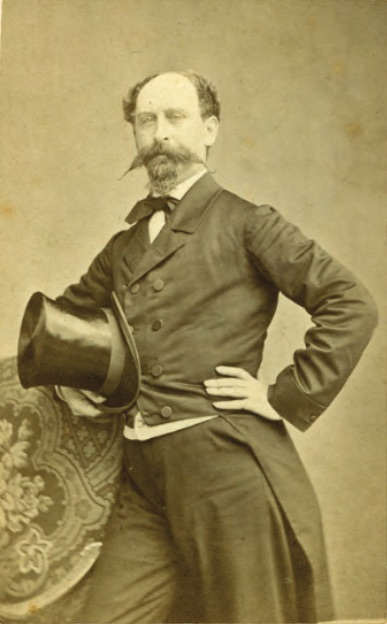
Giuseppe Scarabelli

Giuseppe Scarabelli Gommi Flamini (5 September 1820 – 28 October 1905) was an Italian geologist, palaeontologist and politician; he is remembered as the founder of Italian prehistoric archaeology and was the first archaeologist to carry out a stratigraphic excavation in Italy. Scarabelli is particularly remembered for his discovery of ancient stone weapons found in and around Imola, and the article he wrote on the subject in 1850.

== Biography ==
Scarabelli was born in Imola, his father being a doctor, Giovanni Scarabelli, and his mother, the countess Elena Gommi Flamini. On the death in 1845 of his maternal uncle Giacomo, Scarabelli inherited the noble title of count, even if he did not choose to use the title during his lifetime.

He received his primary and secondary education at home, taught by tutors chosen by the family. After 1840 he began studying anatomy at the universities of Bologna and Florence. He then moved on to the study of natural sciences by going, as an auditor, to the University of Pisa. Here he had the opportunity to attend the lessons of two of the greatest Italian experts of the period, Paolo Savi and Leopoldo Pilla. From them he learned the research techniques of stratigraphic geology, an innovative discipline at that time. On 31 January 1851 he married Countess Giovanna Alessandretti.

== Scientific work ==
In the years between 1843 and 1847, he travelled to many Italian regions: he was in Tuscany, in Milan, in various pre-alpine lakes (Como, Maggiore, Lugano), in Verona, Vicenza, Naples and Sicily. Back in his native region, Scarabelli undertook systematic investigations relating to the position and age of the bones of some large mammals that had inhabited the Imola Apennines in prehistoric times. Another innovative line of research, which gave him a leading role in the affirmation of geology and palethnology in Italy, was represented by the study of the stone weapons collected there. In 1850 he published the results of his research in the study Observations on ancient hard stone weapons that were collected in the Imola area, considered one of the first scientific contributions to Italian prehistory, with particular reference to objects from the Paleolithic and Neolithic periods.

In addition to field research, he also devoted himself to geological cartography. Scarabelli was the first to make geological maps according to modern methods of the Republic of San Marino (1848), of the Province of Bologna (1853), of Ravenna (1854) and of northern Marche. In 1858 he published a large monograph, created with the Veronese scholar Abramo Massalongo, dedicated to studies on the fossil flora and stratigraphic geology of the Senigallia area. The work had as its object the vast collection of artefacts that Scarabelli personally acquired upon the death of the previous owner, near Senigallia. The first major work that Scarabelli had to carry out after the unification of Italy was the geological map of the province of Forlì, commissioned in 1865. The scholar from Imola worked on the project for several years. The final result, a monumental 1: 50,000 scale map, was excellent for scientific precision and accurate graphic design.

Protagonist of the period of fervor of studies and specialist publications of the second half of the nineteenth century, he was a promoter of the International Congresses of Geology and those of Anthropology and Archeology. A precursor of modern archaeological research, he presented at the Bologna Congress in 1871 the discoveries made in the Grotta del Re Tiberio (in the Vena del Gesso Romagnola), the first excavation carried out with the stratigraphic method. In 1878 at the Universal Exposition in Paris he was awarded a bronze medal for his Geological Map of part of the Apennines at a scale of 1:200,000.

Between 1873 and 1883 he was engaged in archaeological excavations in the prehistoric village located on Mount Castellaccio. The resulting voluminous essay, The fully explored prehistoric station on Monte Castellaccio (1887), was exemplary both for the method of exposure and for the sections and excavation plans; even today, Scarabelli's essay is the only example of a complete excavation of a Bronze Age village in Italy. In collaboration with Edoardo Brizio, between 1891 and 1901 he directed the excavations of the prehistoric village of San Giuliano near Toscanella di Dozza (the report was published after his death).

Since 1857 he was one of the founders of the Imola "Cabinet of Natural History", the first nucleus of the Museum which is now named after him. A member of the Accademia dei Lincei, Scarabelli was president of the Italian Geological Society in 1888.

== Political activities ==
A fervent patriot, Scarabelli participated in the Risorgimento uprisings until the vote of annexation of the Legation of Romagna to the Kingdom of Sardinia (1859). He was the first mayor of Imola after the proclamation of the Kingdom of Italy (from 1860 to 1866); in 1864 he was appointed senator of the Kingdom. He was also the president of two institutions that still exist in Imola: the kindergarten (founded in 1847, today the Kindergarten) and the Cassa di Risparmio (founded in 1855). He died in Imola in 1905, and is buried in the local Piratello cemetery.
