= List of operas by Georg Philipp Telemann =

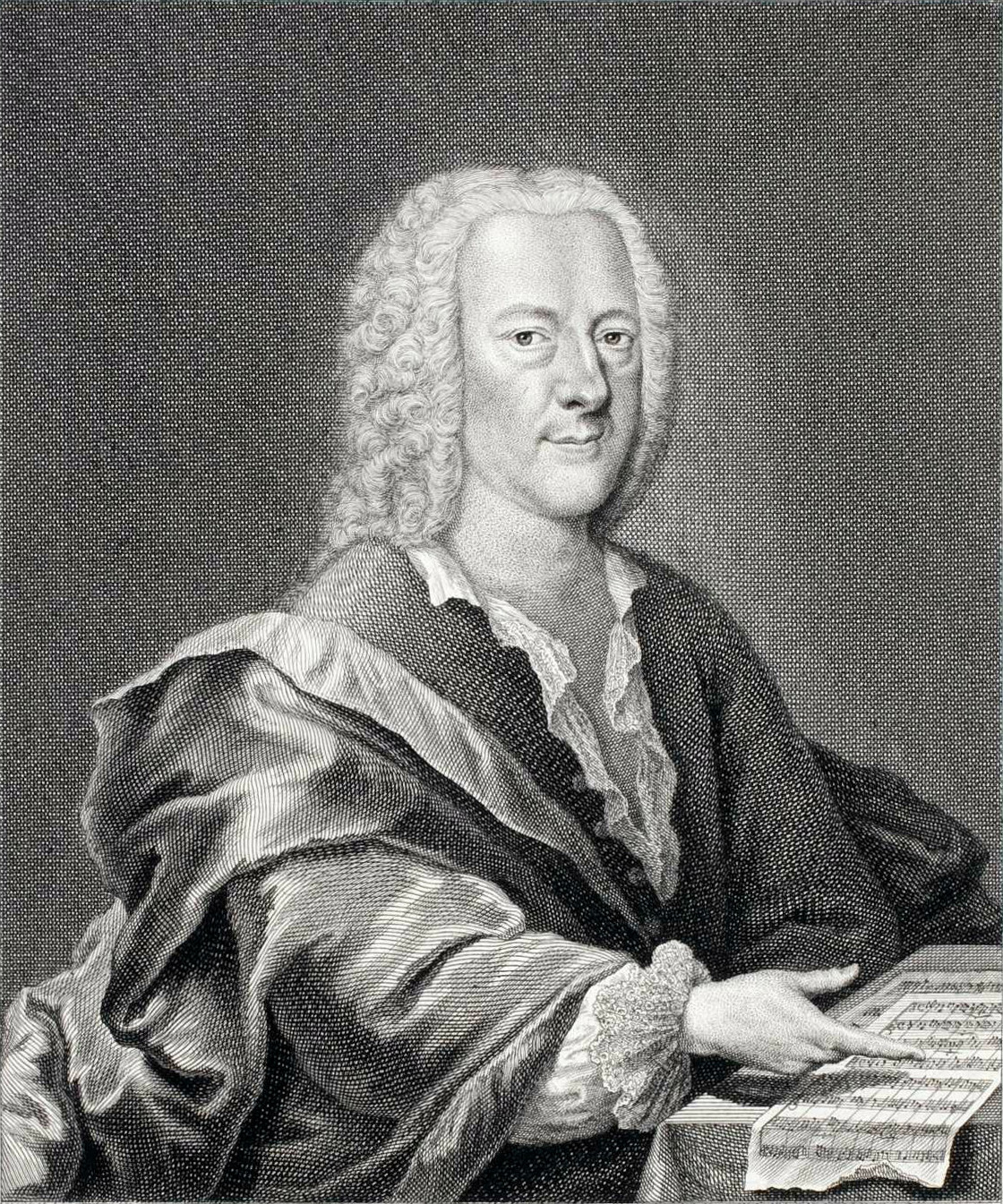
Georg Philipp Telemann

This is a list of operas by Georg Philipp Telemann (1681–1767).

According to historical sources, Telemann may have written over 50 operas; however, only 35 works are of sufficient substance to appear in his catalogue of works (see below), and only nine of these are preserved complete.

== List ==
Operas by Georg Philipp Telemann
TVWV	Title	Acts	Libretto	Premiere		Notes
TVWV	Title	Acts	Libretto	Date	Venue	Notes
21:5	Narcissus	3 acts	Johann Christian Rau, after Apostolo Zeno	1701 and Easter 1709	Leipzig	
21:1	Der lachende Democritus	3 acts	after Nicolò Minato	1703	Leipzig	
21:2	Ferdinand und Isabella	5 acts	by the composer, after another source	Spring 1703	Leipzig	
21:3	Cajus Caligula	3 acts		Easter 1704	Leipzig	
deest	Germanicus		Christine Dorothea Lachs	written in 1704, revised 1710, premiered 2007		40 arias survive; performing edition by Michael Maul, premiered by Gotthold Schwarz and the Saxon Baroque Orchestra
21:4	Adonis	3 acts		Easter 1708	Leipzig	
21:6	Mario	3 acts	German translation after Silvio Stampiglia	Easter 1709	Leipzig	
deest	Pastorelle en musique	Overture (concerto) and 10 scenes	Telemann, inspired by Molière's Les Amants magnifiques (1670)	between 1711 and 1716	Frankfurt	
21:7	Jupiter und Semele	3 acts	Lost	1716 or 1718	Leipzig	
21:8	Die Satyren in Arcadien revised version: Der neumodische Liebhaber Damon	3 acts	by the composer, after Pietro Pariati	1719, revised version: 30 August 1724	Leipzig; revised version: Hamburg], Oper am Gänsemarkt	
21:9	Der geduldige Sokrates	3 acts	Johann Ulrich König, after Nicolò Minato's La pazienza di Socrate	28 January 1721	Hamburg, Theater am Gänsemarkt	komisches Singspiel
21:20	Sancio or Die siegende Großmuth	3 acts	Johann Ulrich König, after Francesco Silvani	6 October 1721	Hamburg	
21:10	Der Sieg der Schönheit revised version: Gensericus	3 acts	Christian Heinrich Postel, reworked by Christian Friedrich Weichmann	13 July 1723, revised version: 1725	Hamburg; revised version: Braunschweig	
21:11	Belsazar, oder Das Ende der babylonischen Gefangenschaft	3 acts plus 3 acts	Joachim Beccau	First part: 19 July 1723; second part: 22 September 1723	Hamburg	
21:12	Alarich, oder Die Straf-Ruthe des verfallenen Roms	3 acts		2 August 1723	Bayreuth	
21:13	Der Schluß des Carnevals	3 acts		21 February 1724	Hamburg	
21:14	Omphale	5 acts	by the composer, after Antoine Houdar de la Motte	1724	Hamburg	
21:17	Adelheid, oder Die ungezwungene Liebe	3 acts	after Johann Christian Hallmann	1724	Bayreuth	
	Cimbriens allgemeines Frolocken			17 February 1725	Hamburg	
21:16	La capricciosa e il credulo also as Die geliebte Eigensinnige und der leichtgläubige Liebhaber	1 act	Johann Philipp Praetorius	August/September 1725	Hamburg	
21:15	Pimpinone, oder Die ungleiche Heirath, oder das herrsch-süchtige Cammer-Mädgen	1 act	Johann Philipp Praetorius, after Pietro Pariati	27 September 1725	Hamburg	intermezzo
21:18	Orpheus, oder Die wunderbare Beständigkeit der Liebe	3 acts	by the composer, after Friedrich Christian Bressand	9 March 1726	Hamburg, Theater am Gänsemarkt (concert performance?)	musicalisches Drama
21:21	Buffonet und Alga	1 act	Christoph Gottlieb Wendt	14 July 1727	Hamburg	intermezzo
21:19	Calypso			1727	Hamburg	Singspiel
21:22	Die Amours der Vespetta or Der Galan in der Kiste	1 act	C. W. Haken	1 October 1727	Hamburg	Nachspiel
21:23	Die verkehrte Welt	3 acts	Johann Philipp Praetorius, after Alain-René Lesage	10 February 1728	Hamburg	opéra comique
21:24	Miriways	3 acts	Johann Samuel Müller	26 May 1728	Hamburg	Singspiel
21:25	Emma und Eginhard oder Die Last-tragende Liebe	3 acts	Christoph Gottlieb Wendt	22 November 1728	Hamburg	
21:26	Aesopus bey Hofe	3 acts	Johann Mattheson, after Pietro Pariati	28 February 1728	Hamburg	
21:27	Flavius Bertaridus, König der Langobarden	3 acts	Christoph Gottlieb Wendt and the composer, after Steffano Ghigi	23 November 1729	Hamburg	
21:29	Margaretha, Königin in Castilien	5 acts	Johann Georg Hamann	10 August 1730	Hamburg	
21:30	Der Weiseste in Sidon	3 acts	Johann Georg Hamann, after Silvio Stampiglia	4 February 1733	Hamburg	
21:31	Die rachgierige Liebe oder Orasia, verwittwete Königin in Thracien (revised version of Orpheus)	3 acts	Lost	15 October 1736	Hamburg	
21:32	Don Quichotte auf der Hochzeit des Comacho or Don Quixotte, der Löwenritter		Daniel Schiebeler	1761	Hamburg, Konzertsaal (concert performance)	serenata

=== Undated fragments ===
TWV	Title	Genre	Libretto
21:33	Adam und Eva	operette	C. Richter
21:34	Hercules und Alceste	Comödie	
21:35	Herodes und Marianne	opera oratorio	J. S. Müller

=== Contributions to operas by other composers ===
Title	TWV	Composer	Première date	Place
Ulysses	22:1	Giuseppe Maria Orlandini	19 November 1731	Hamburg
Die Flucht des Aeneas	22:10	Nicola Porpora	19 November 1731	Hamburg
Judith, Gemahlin Kayser Ludewig des Frommen	22:12	Fortunato Chelleri	27 November 1732	Hamburg
