= Johann Balthasar Christian Freißlich =

German composer and organist

Johann Balthasar Christian Freislich (also Freißlich, Fraißlich, baptised 30 March 1687 – 17 April 1764) was a German composer and organist.

== Life ==
Johann Balthasar Christian Freißlich was born in Immelborn near Bad Salzungen, the son of a clergy man. He probably received his earliest musical education at the Court of Saxe-Meiningen, where the Hofkapelle at the time was under the direction of Georg Caspar Schürmann. From 1709, Freißlich studied in Jena. In 1714, he received an appointment as court organist to the Prince of Schwarzburg-Sondershausen in Sondershausen, where he also had to teach. In 1716, he was promoted to the position of court Kapellmeister. During his time there, he was sent to Dresden in order to study the newly developed pantaleon with its inventor, the violinist and pantaleonist Pantaleon Hebenstreit.

In 1731, he succeeded his half brother Maximilian Dietrich Freißlich as Kapellmeister in the Marienkirche, the largest church in Danzig (today Gdańsk, Poland). He also worked as the director of the opera orchestra. Freißlich is thought to be one of the teachers of Johann Gottlieb Goldberg. He was succeeded as Kapellmeister at the Marienkirche by his son-in-law Christian Friedrich Morheim, a former pupil of Johann Sebastian Bach. He died in Danzig in 1764.

Freißlich was a prolific composer. His surviving output includes around 90 church cantatas, as well as numerous chorales, secular cantatas and funeral cantatas, an "Operina" Die verliebte Nonne, one Brockes Passion, one Matthew Passion and a Sonata for oboe, strings and continuo composed for use in church.

== Recordings ==
- Cantata an dem hohen Geburtsfeste des Herrn Augusti III. Könige in Polen, FreisWV E 17; Capella Gedanensis, cond. Alina Kowalska-Pińczak; Futurex Classics FCD 01216
- Der Herr dein Gott sey gelobet (Kantata na uroczysty dzień urodzin Najjaśniejszego Pana, Króla Polski Augusta III); Skarby Muzyki Dawnego Gdańskał; Capella Gedanensis; Soliton SCD 058-060, disc 3
