= Opernhaus vorm Salztor =

German opera house

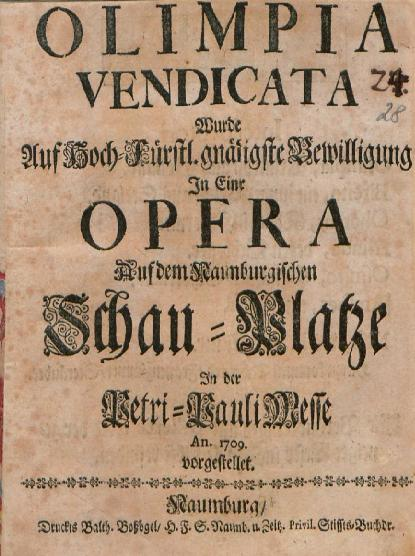
- Cover of the libretto of Olimpia Vendicata by Heinichen, performed in 1709
- Address: Naumburg
- Coordinates: 51°09′02″N 11°48′21″E
- Designation: Opera house

Construction
- Opened: 28 June 1701
- Closed: 1716

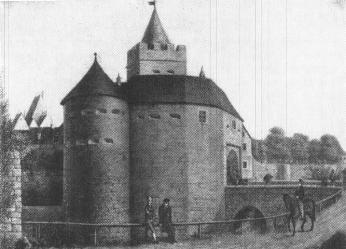
The Salztor in Naumburg in the 18th century; between the gate and the ledge on the right was the opera house behind the wall

The Opernhaus vorm Salztor (Opera house in front of the Salt Tower) was an opera house in Naumburg, then Saxe-Zeitz, that opened in 1701. The house was built during the regency of Moritz Wilhelm, Duke of Saxe-Zeitz, on his behalf. In 1716, it burned down and was not rebuilt. In the 15 years of its existence, at least 14 different operas and one play were performed there. One of them survived, Johann David Heinichen's Der glückliche Liebeswechsel oder Paris und Helena, and was revived in 2012 in a concert performance.

== Background ==
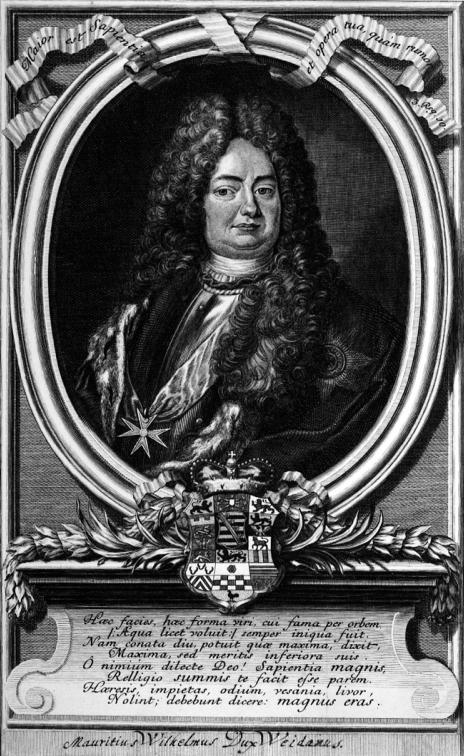
Moritz Wilhelm, Duke of Saxe-Zeitz

The city of Naumburg had held a trade fair privilege from the emperor since the Middle Ages, which it made use of with the Petri-und-Pauli-Messe, held every year in June. Since Leipzig, 60 km away, also had such a privilege since 1669, the two cities were in competition. Leipzig had a functioning theatre for the entertainment of trade fair guests, the Oper am Brühl opened in 1693, in which operas were performed during three trade fair periods.

In order to increase the attractiveness of the Naumburg fair, Moritz Wilhelm, Duke of Saxe-Zeitz, in whose territory the town of Naumburg lay, had the opera house built. He only owned the so-called Residenzhaus and an official building, but had four plots of land requisitioned at the end of Neugasse near the Salztor in order to build an opera house.

== Building ==
The opera house, opened in 1701, was about 27 metres long and 12 to 16.5 metres wide, thus the house may have accommodated about 400 people.

The building plans were probably made by the master builder Johann Heinrich Gengenbach, who was in the ducal service at the time. The house (in contrast to the Leipzig opera house, which was 10 metres longer) was built of masonry, had a basement and was equipped with various theatre machines.

On the Naumburg city map of 1701, the opera house can be seen as a cross-shaped building. Unfortunately, other depictions of the building no longer exist.

== History ==
The opera house in front of the Salztor was ceremoniously opened on the afternoon of 28 June 1701 with the opera Orpheus und Euridice, possibly by Reinhold Keiser, "in front of all high princely lords". Other sources speak of an opening only in 1702. Opera performances in Naumburg were public, but were ordered, supervised and financed by the Duke. He also continued to own the house. Thus, unlike other civic operas of the time (for example Oper am Gänsemarkt in Hamburg or the Oper am Brühl), Naumburg took on a special role, as the opera house was not financed by citizens. Another difference between the Naumburg house and other princely theatres of the Baroque period was that the house was only used for performances during the Petri-und-Pauls-Messe, a trade fair named after Peter and Paul, around 29 June of each year. Like the Leipzig opera, performances were restricted to trade fair occasions. The Duke chose the composers of the operas to be performed and, as can be read in some biographies of the opera composers, moved to Naumburg with his entire court during the opera seasons. Some of the composers also wrote music for the ducal table before the opera performances.

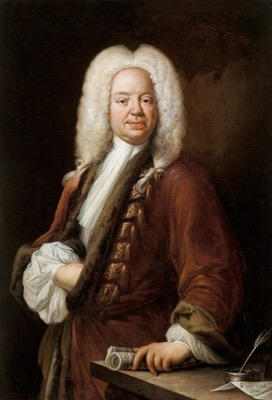
Georg Caspar Schürmann

The organisation of opera performances is rather poorly documented. The Naumburg-born composer Johann Theile, who had composed operas for the Hamburg opera, was in Naumburg around 1710, but there is only evidence of Theile acting as an intermediary in 1712 to Gottfried Heinrich Stölzel, who was in Halle at the time to deliver the Duke's commission to compose the opera Valeria and could not direct the opera. Samuel Ernst Döbricht, the son-in-law of the founder of the Leipzig opera, Nicolaus Adam Strungk, is more likely to have been director. Döbricht delivered a message from the duke in Zeitz, dated 8 June 1709, to the ducal administrator in Naumburg, enclosing four keys for the opera house. In it, the Duke requested his representative to "inventory the machines and other things in the opera house" and then to hand over the keys to Döbricht. This handover initiated a guest performance by the Leipzig opera company, which was then to culminate in the performance of Johann David Heinichen's Olympia Vendicata at fair time in 1709. Also in 1711, Döbricht is mentioned in the personnel files of the Zeitz court orchestra as composer. Johann Christoph Frauendorff is also considered for the direction of the opera in the years 1704 to 1716, as he was a Saxe-Zeitz councillor and held the office of mayor of Naumburg in rotation for two years; he also wrote librettos for Georg Caspar Schürmann's operas. Whether the musicians of the Zeitz court chapel, which had been led by Theile's pupil Christian Heinrich Aschenbrenner since 1695, were used for the Naumburg opera performances or whether other musicians played is not clearly established.

The stage technology in Naumburg can only be reconstructed today on the basis of the requirements for the plays performed. There were probably three fields on the stage, one behind the other (including Bühnenprospekt), as was required in the play Das verwirrte Haus Jacob.

The Duke tried to rival the Leipzig opera house, and over the years engaged composers such as Schürmann, Heinichen, Stölzel, Johann Friedrich Fasch, and Barthold Feind. The "Leipzig style", of not only purely German operas were performed, but also purely Italian operas and German operas with Italian interludes, also prevailed in Naumburg. Since the other Thuringian princes were probably regular guests at the Naumburg opera house, they had noticeably fewer operas staged at their courts during the Naumburg opera period, as they could satisfy their opera interests in Naumburg.

The Naumburg opera house was destroyed by fire on 30 April 1716 and was not rebuilt afterwards. In 1717, two opera performances from 1717 in took place at the Residenzhaus am Markt.

Since the Duke lost the administration of the Protestant Bishopric of Naumburg-Zeitz on 2 May 1717, due to his conversion to Catholicism, and had to cede the Duchy of Saxe-Zeitz to the Electorate of Saxony, the youngest Saxon secundogeniture came to an end, which also meant the end of Naumburg's opera history.

The ruins of the opera house stood at least until 1752. The site of the old opera house was later rebuilt, and house the Naumburg City Archives.

== List of operas ==
Only the opera Der glückliche Liebeswechsel oder Paris und Helena by Heinichen has survived from the Naumburg repertoire, of the others only a few arias or only the librettos still exist. Only the names of some of the operas are known. Composers have included Johann Friedrich Fasch, Johann David Heinichen, Reinhard Keiser, Johann Augustin Kobelius, Georg Caspar Schürmann, Gottfried Heinrich Stölzel and Georg Philipp Telemann.

Title	Composer	Libretto	Premiere	Notes
Orpheus und Euridice	Keiser?	?	1701	28 June
Jupiter und Callisto	?	?	1702	
Das verwirrte Haus Jacob	–	–	1703	Play with incidental music by Barthold Feind
Octavia	Keiser?	Barthold Feind?	1705	
Telemaque	Schürmann	Johann Christoph Frauendorff	1706	Ballet performances by dance master Samuel Rudolph Behr
Germanicus	Telemann		1706	Not sure if "Germanicus" was played in Naumburg.
Lucretia	Keiser?	Barthold Feind?	1707	
Das verwirrte Haus Jacob	–	–	1708	Repetition from 1703
Olimpia Vendicata	Heinichen	Georg Christian Lehms	1708	Revival in 1709, some arias preserved; the only completely Italian-language opera from Naumburg.
Der glückliche Liebeswechsel oder Paris und Helena	Heinichen	?	1710	Only completely preserved opera from Naumburg
Clomire	Fasch	?	1711	
Der angenehme Betrug oder Karneval in Venedig	Heinichen	?	1711	Repetition of the 1709 performance from Leipzig; some arias preserved
Die getreue Dido	Fasch	?	1712	
Valeria	Stölzel	?	1712	possibly additionally already listed in 1711
Orion	Stölzel	?	1713	
Artemisia	Stölzel	?	1713	
Clomire	Fasch	?	1715	Revival of 1711
Der glückliche Betrug oder Clytia und Orestes	Kobelius	?	1717	Performance at the Residenzhaus
Isabella und Rodrigo	Kobelius?	?	1717	Premiere in Residence house

== Rediscovery of the opera Der glückliche Liebeswechsel oder Paris und Helena ==
In 2001, the archive of the Sing-Akademie zu Berlin which was thought to have been lost, was returned from Kyiv to Berlin. It held an autograph manuscript of Heinichen's opera Der glückliche Liebeswechsel oder Paris und Helena. The opera was revived after more than 300 years in a concert performance by the Berlin Lautten Compagney on 10 November 2012 in the Audimax of the Brandenburg University of Applied Sciences.
