= Samuel Rudolph Behr =

German ballet dancer and composer

Samuel Rudolph Behr (laso Bär or Beer) baptized 1 July 1670 in Leipzig – after 1716) was a German ballet master and composer.

== Life ==
Behr was the son of the Leipzig musician Martin Behr. He enrolled at Leipzig University in the summer of 1691 but did not graduate. He belonged to the nation (university) Meissen. On 4 September 1691 he married Barbara Christina Valentin, the youngest daughter of a painter and head of the painters' guild. Of the four children born of this marriage, only Gottfried Rudolph, baptised in the Nikolaikirche on 24 March 1702, survived. Between 1701 and 1716 he is listed in the Leipzig address books.

In 1703, he published Anleitung zu einer wohl-gegründeten Tanz-Kunst, which was followed by three more books. He maintained close contacts with the Leipzig Oper am Brühl. For example, he wrote the ballet interlude for the opera Otto in 1702. Also for the Opernhaus vorm Salztor in Naumburger, he wrote ballet interludes in 1706. (In literature, he is often confused with the composer Johann Beer, who had already been dead for six years at that time.)

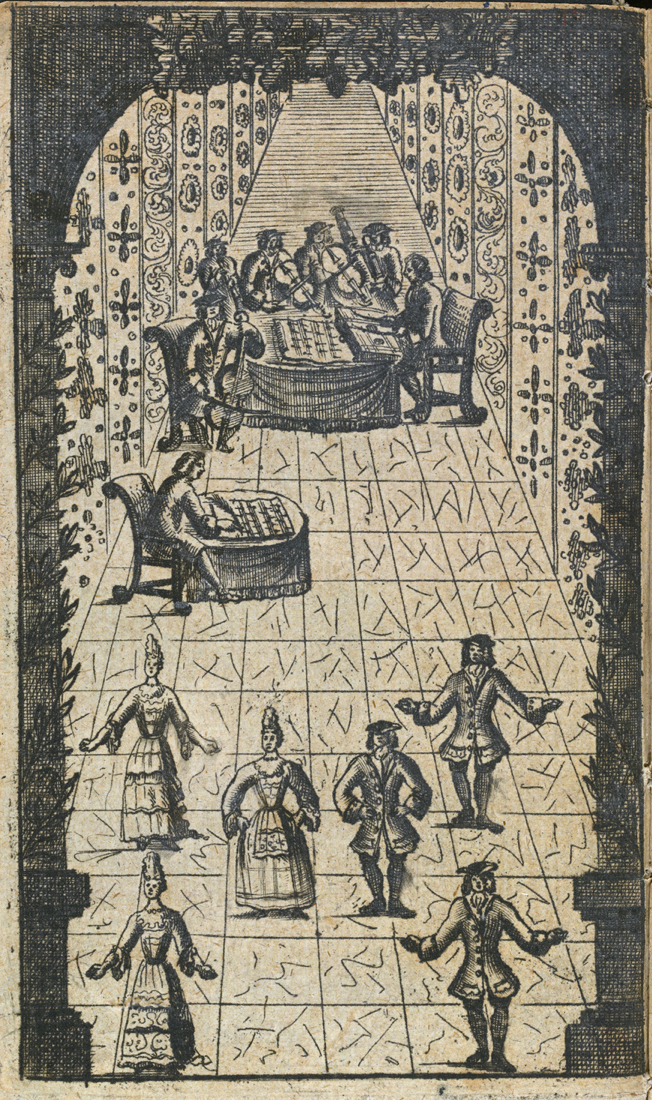
Title copperplate from Anleitung zur Tanzkunst 1703

He was associated with Georg Philipp Telemann, Pantaleon Hebenstreit, Nicolaus Adam Strungk and Johann Kuhnau. The dance master Gottfried Taubert, who published the book Rechtschaffener Tantzmeister, oder gründliche Erklärung der Frantzösischen Tantz-Kunst in Leipzig in 1717, was probably influenced by Behr's publications.

== Work ==
- Anleitung zu einer wohl-gegründeten Tanz-Kunst. Heydler, Leipzig 1703.
- Anderer Theil der Tantz-Kunst, oder ausgesiebte Grillen. Heydler, Leipzig 1703.
- Wohlgegründete Tantz-Kunst. Joh. Heinichens Wittwe, Leipzig, 1709.
- L'Art de bien dancer oder die Kunst wohl zu tanzen. Fulde, Leipzig 1713.
