= Oper am Brühl =

Former opera house in Leipzig (1693–1720)

Coordinates: 51°20′32.5″N 12°22′47.9″E

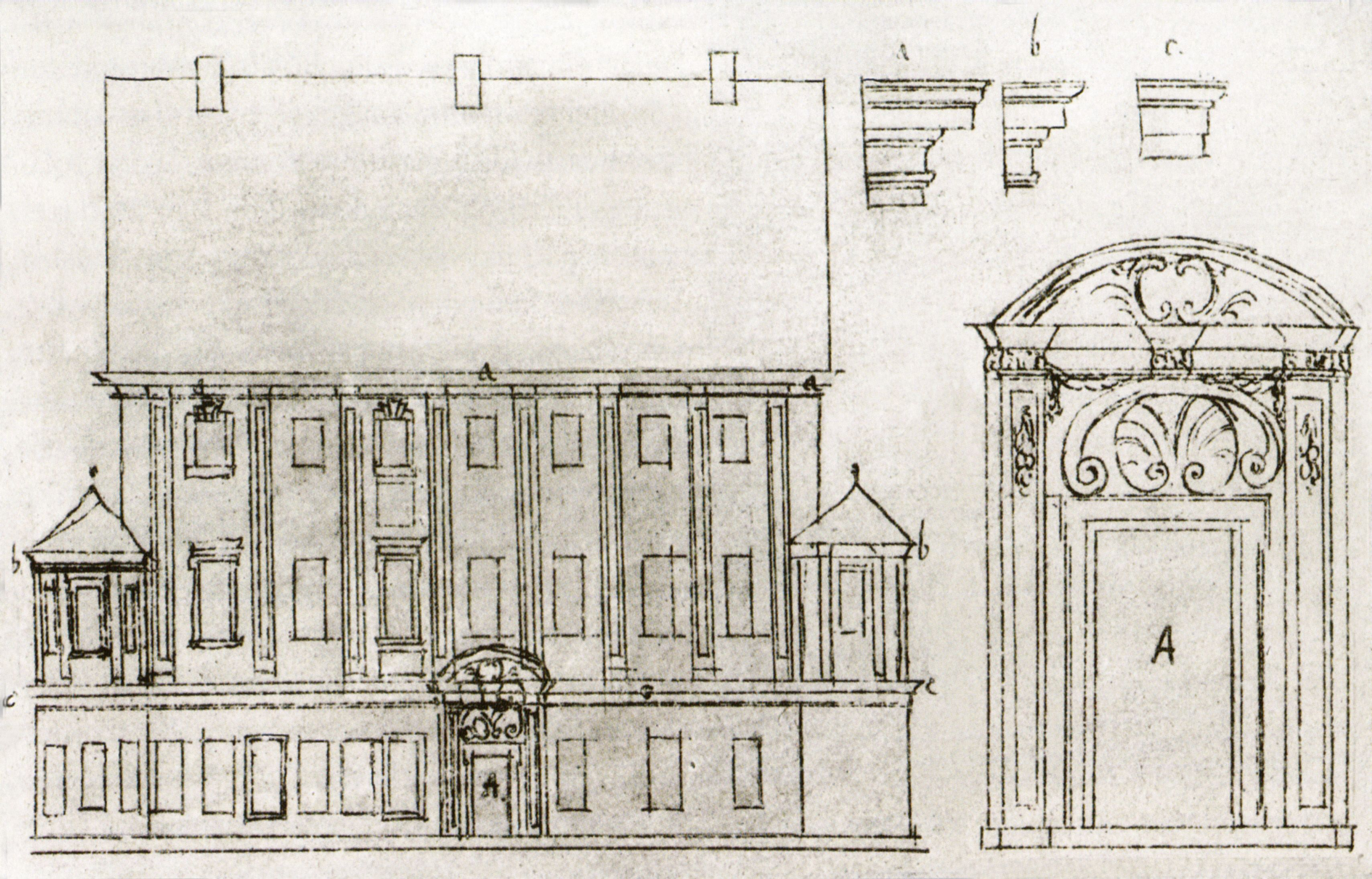
- Sketch of the opera house
- Location: Leipzig, Germany
- Type: Opera house

Construction
- Built: 1693
- Opened: 1693
- Closed: 1720
- Demolished: 1729

The Oper am Brühl (also Barockoper Leipzig) was the first opera house in Leipzig. It existed from 1693 to 1720 and was the second municipal music theatre in Germany, after the Oper am Gänsemarkt in Hamburg. It was initiated by Nicolaus Adam Strungk who saw a potential audience during the three annual trade fairs in Leipzig. An opera house was built, and opened on 8 May 1693. The house flourished when Georg Philipp Telemann directed the opera from 1703 to 1705. Among his operas for the house is Germanicus, premiered in 1704. A collection of 100 excerpts from the operas, Musicalische Rüstkammer, has been explored for background. The building was found in a dangerous state in 1719, was closed in 1720 and demolished in 1729.

== Location and description ==
The opera house at Brühl was located almost at the eastern end of the street and bordered the city wall to the north. After the construction of the Georgenhaus in 1701, it was its neighbouring building. According to Leipzig council records, the building was a three-storey wooden house with a gable roof, 47 metres long, 15 metres wide and 10 metres high. The facade was structured by eight pilasters, and ornaments decorated the entrance portal. The semicircular auditorium had fifty boxes on five triforiums. The stage featured 15 pairs of scenery.

== Construction and first performances ==
Kapellmeister Nicolaus Adam Strungk (1640–1700) from the Dresden court had realised that at least at the three Leipzig Trade Fairs, around New Year's Day, Easter and Michaelis in September, there was an audience in Leipzig interested in opera performances and ready to pay for them. He therefore sought a licence for opera performances, which was granted to him in 1692 by the Saxon Elector Johann Georg IV for ten years, in each case for the fair times and at his own expense.

The opera house was the second municipal music theatre in Germany, after the Oper am Gänsemarkt in Hamburg. Together with the Italian architect Girolamo Sartorio, who had built the Hamburg opera house in 1678, Strungk leased the property in January 1693 for 300 thalers annually. The theatre was built within only four months, so that the first performance could take place in the presence of the Elector during the Leipzig Easter Fair of 1693 on 8 May. The program included Strungk's Alceste. The German libretto, after Aurelio Aureli, was written by Paul Thymich, a teacher of the Thomasschule. The title role was sung by Thymich's wife. Sartorio had built elaborate sets, with a forest, a king's hall and a hellish dragon with flames. The team produced several more operas.

From 1696, Christian Ludwig Boxberg joined as librettist and composer. He composed and directed the operas Die verschwiegene Treue and Sardanapalus for a guest performance by the Leipzig opera company at the court of Margrave Georg Friedrich von Brandenburg-Ansbach in 1698. The autograph of the latter has been preserved in the Staatliche Bibliothek Ansbach. The piece is the oldest surviving German-language opera from central Germany. It was revived in 2012 at the Ekhof-Theater) in Gotha.

== Telemann ==
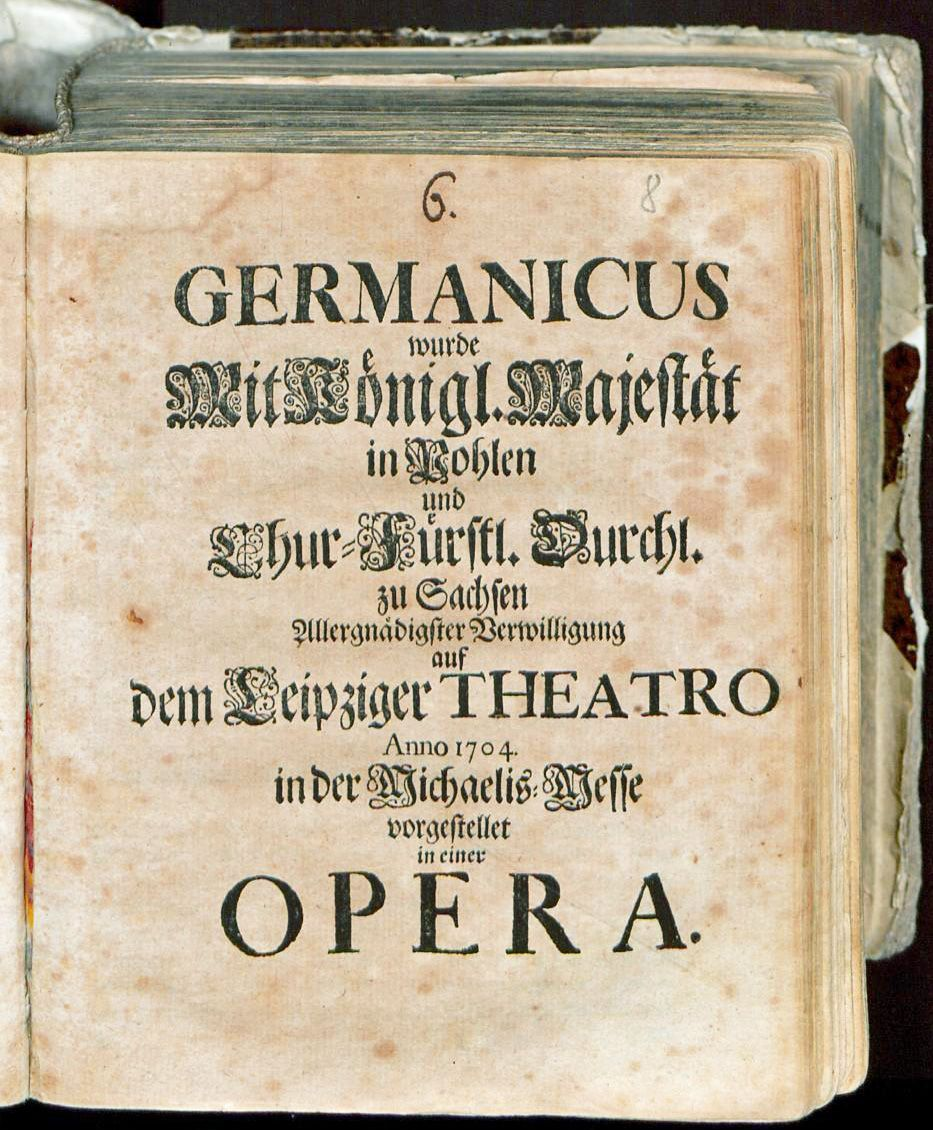
Title page of Telemann's opera Germanicus

The opera house reached its prominence when Georg Philipp Telemann, who had enrolled at Leipzig University two years earlier, became music director in 1703. He founded an amateur orchestra of 40 players, mostly students of music, the Collegium Musicum, which also played opera. Telemann's roommate, the later composer Christoph Graupner, was among the players. Telemann wrote the texts for many of his operas, played the keyboard in the orchestra and sometimes sang opera roles. In 1704, his opera Germanicus, to a libretto by Christine Dorothea Lachs, was first performed, to be repeated in 1710. He left Leipzig in 1705 for a position at the Sorau court, but kept composing operas for the Leipzig house. In a autobiography, Telemann reported:

... Soon afterwards, I took over the direction of the operas, of which I have written a total of several and twenty, even from Sorau and Franckfurt, and the verses to many of them. For the court of Weissenfels, I produced about four operas, and finally established the still standing music college in Leipzig...

When Saxony was occupied by Swedish troops in 1706 as a result of the Treaty of Altranstädt, no more performances took place, but performances were resumed in 1708, especially works by Melchior Hoffmann who was music director from 1706 to 1715, and Johann David Heinichen who was active in 1709 and 1710. Hoffmann also directed the Collegium Musicum, with players including the later composers Johann Georg Pisendel and Gottfried Heinrich Stölzel. The composers Johann Christian Schieferdecker and Gottfried Grünewald, who later worked at the Oper am Gänsemarkt in Hamburg, were also pupils of the Leipzig Opera. Singers included Johanna Elisabeth Hesse née Döbricht (1692–1786), a sister of Samuel Ernst Döbricht (a son-in-law of Strungk), who went on to Darmstadt as a court singer in 1711.

In total, there were 104 productions in the 27 years of the opera house's existence, which sometimes meant more than one production per year, with three seasons per year. Themes included ancient heroic fables, historical events, motifs from contemporary novels and the popular shepherd's plays. The performers were often students and, in the beginning, Strungk's two sisters and his five daughters.

== Organisation and decline ==
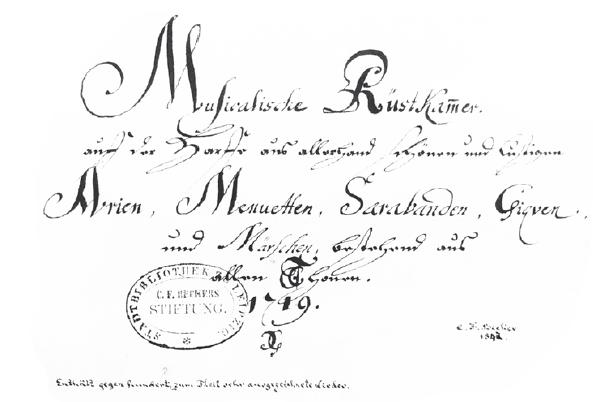
Cover of the Musicalische Rüstkammer

During Strungk's lifetime, there were already financial difficulties, and Sartorio had to serve a mandatory prison sentence for non-payment of rent. After Strungk's death, his widow ran the business for a few years from 1700. When she died their children refused the inheritance because of the high debts. A son of Sartorio, Johann Friedrich Sartorio, and Samuel Ernst Döbricht who had married Strungk's daughter Philippine stepped in as tenants from 1710, and Döbricht also as director and bass of the opera. Döbricht additionally directed the Opernhaus vorm Salztor in nearby Naumburg from 1710, which then took over productions from the Leipzig theatre.

The situation behind the scenes of productions became increasingly difficult. Sartorio's son demanded a say, as well as Strungk's daughters. From 1711, Dorothea Maria Strungk appeared as artistic director, and Elisabeth Catharine Strungk as contralto who appeared as Agrippina in Telemann's Germanicus. The parties fought each other in changing constellations over the following years. Costumes of another party were hidden; and in 1712, Döbricht destroyed the stage set of a Strungk daughter with an axe shortly before the premiere of the Echo and Narcissus, but reassembled everything afterwards. In 1716, Döbricht gave up his position.

Johann Gottfried Vogler was musical director from 1716, but fled Leipzig during the Michaelis Fair of 1719, because of debt incurred. He is also said to have stolen instruments from the Neukirche in Leipzig.

The building of the opera house on the Brühl had shown deficiencies from the beginning, to which the fast construction probably contributed, so that frequent repairs had to be made. In 1719, an expert's report certified that the state of the building posed a danger to life and health. The opera house was therefore closed in 1720. In 1729, the city council bought it and had it demolished.

The musical quality of the performances in this house was still reflected decades later. In 1752, the composer Johann Joachim Quantz and flute teacher to Frederick the Great wrote:

... The operas which have been in flourishing condition in Hamburg and Leipzig for quite a long time, and which have now perished, and the famous composers who have worked [...] for them, have made good preparations for the degree of good taste in which music in Germany at present stands...

== Reception ==
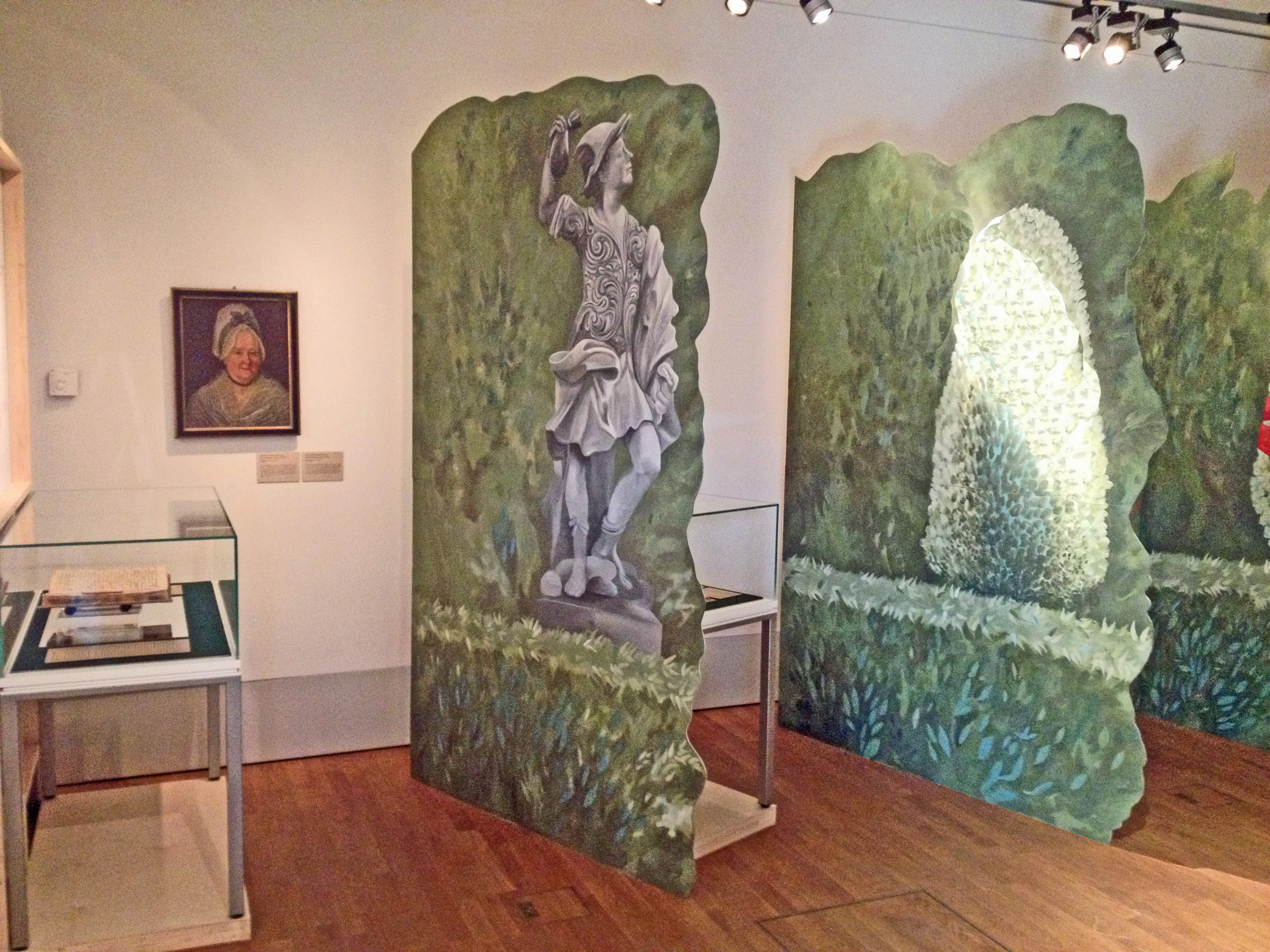
View of the Leipzig exhibition on Baroque opera in March 2013

In 2009, Michael Maul published the results of his investigation into Leipzig's Baroque opera as the outcome of an extensive research project into the history of the opera house, which had hitherto been little studied, initiated by the Bach Archive Leipzig.

Titled "Liebe. Macht. Leidenschaft. Die Leipziger Barockoper" (Love. Power. Passion. The Leipzig Baroque Opera), an exhibition at the Bach Museum Leipzig from 15 March to 25 August 2013 focused on the Oper am Brühl, and presented original textbooks and documents on the history of the house.

Apart from the operas Germanicus and Die Lybische Talestris by Heinichen (first performed in 1709, rediscovered in 2009 and performed again in Bad Lauchstädt) only single arias from operas of the house have survived, most of them (100 pieces) in the collection Musicalische Rüstkammer (Musical Armoury), a handwritten, anonymously composed music book from 1719, which is kept in the Stadtbibliothek Leipzig.

== Recordings ==
- Telemann: Germanicus. CPO, DDD, 2010, Olivia Stahn, Elisabeth Scholl, Matthias Rexroth, Henryk Böhm, Tobias Berndt, Sächsisches Barockorchester, Gotthold Schwarz.
- Telemann und die Leipziger Oper – Populäre Arien aus der Sammlung Musicalische Rüstkammer. Pan Classics, DDD, 2011, Jan Kobow (tenor), United Continuo Ensemble.
- Nuria Rial – Telemann. DHM, DDD, 2010, Nuria Rial, Julia Schröder, Kammerorchester Basel.
- Sardanapalus. PAN, DDD, 2014, Jan Kobow, Rinnat Moriah, Franz Vitzthum, Sören Richter, United Continuo Ensemble, Bernhard Epstein.
