= Johann Christoph Frauendorff =

German librettist

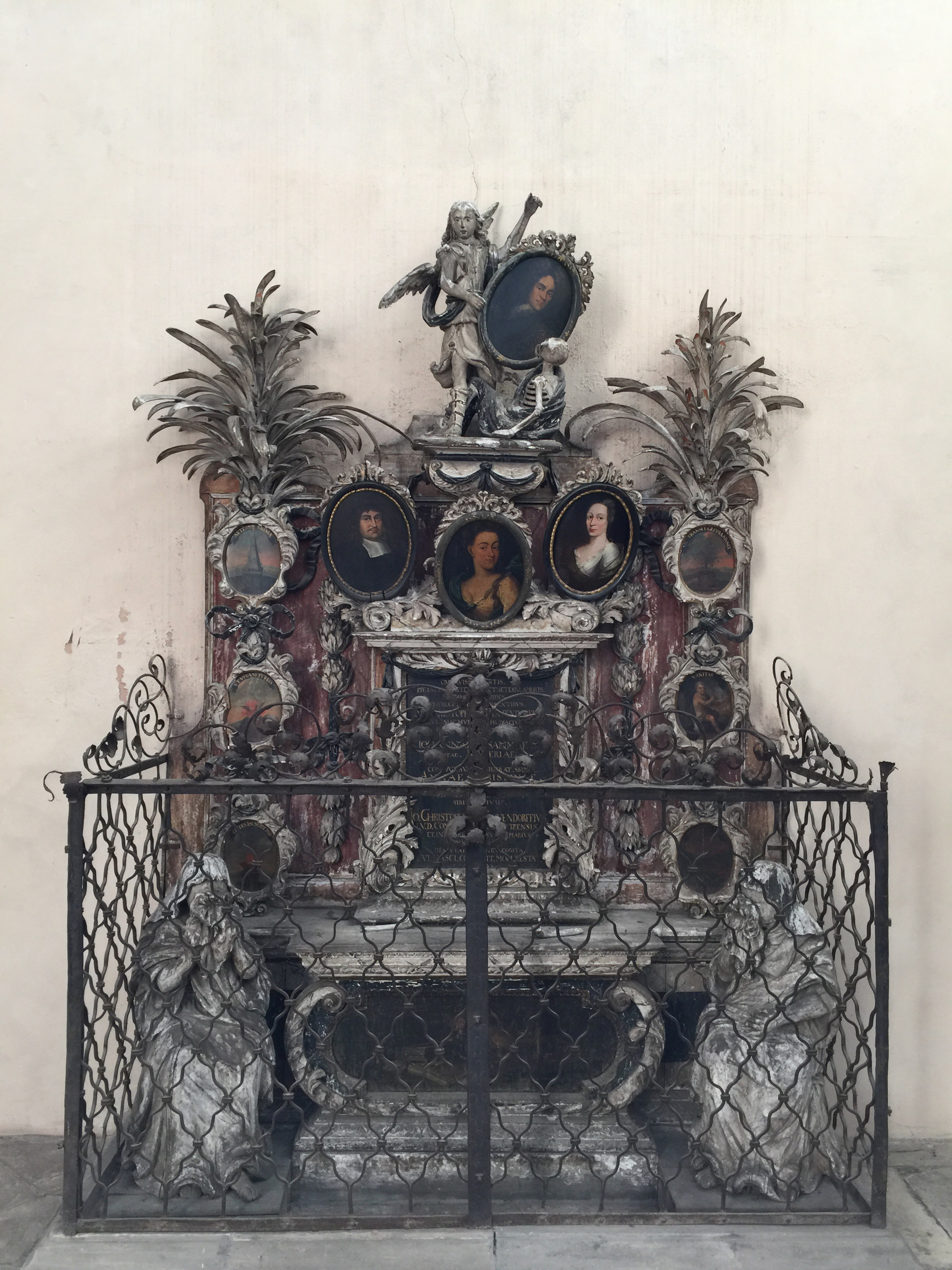
Epitaph in the Wenceslas Church in Naumburg with portrait of Johann Christoph Frauendorff (above between angel and death) from 1707

Johann Christoph Frauendorff (also Frauendorf) (1 October 1664 – 22 October 1740) was a German librettist, lawyer and mayor of Naumburg.

== Life ==
Born in Naumburg, Frauendorf was the son of the archdeacon of Naumburg Christoph Frauendorff († 1677) and his wife Johanna Susanna née. Berger. After studying law and theology in Leipzig and Strasbourg (1683-1685), which he completed with theological (1688, 1692, 1693) and legal disputations (1694), he became a collegiate councillor in Wurzen in 1697 and between 1704 and 1718 he held the office of mayor of Naumburg in rotation every second year, after he had been naturalised in Naumburg on 10 August 1698. At this time he was also a court librettist and Saxe-Zeitz councillor in the service of the Dukes of Saxe-Zeitz, succeeding Heinrich Anselm von Ziegler und Kliphausen.

He wrote his first opera libretto for Georg Caspar Schürmann's opera Das verstöhrte Troja, which was performed in 1706 at the Opera House at Hagenmarkt in Braunschweig. In 1706, he wrote the libretto for the opera Telemaque performed at the Opernhaus vorm Salztor in Naumburg in the same year, for which Georg Caspar Schürmann also composed the music and Samuel Rudolph Behr contributed ballet interludes. The opera was performed again in 1717 by both of them as Telemachus and Calypso, reworked, at the Braunschweig Opera and was staged again in 1722 in Bayreuth. Whether he also directed the opera house in Naumburg is not clearly established.

He set himself in 1707 in the Wenzelskirche an epitaph with 4 portrait medallions depicting himself, his father, his mother and an Anna Christina Schlaf (probably his first wife).

In 1708, he married Johanna Christiana Leyser (born 1686) and on 1 November 1709 his daughter Johanna Dorothea Frauendorf was born. In 1712, during his time in Naumburg, he came into conflict with the head priest there, Pastor Johann Martin Schamelius, (1668-1742) concerning religious questions.

For the decoration of the Marienkirche in Naumburg, Frauendorf enlisted the Italian Bernhardo Brentani and the Nuremberg Wilhelm Rössel, paying a large part of their expenses himself.

In 1718, he applied, since he had lost his position with the dissolution of the secundogeniture Sachsen-Zeitz, he applied for further employment at Naumburg Abbey. This was probably unsuccessful, as he is named as Amtmann in Torgau in 1725.

From the year 1729, an investigation against the former Amtmann Dr. Johann Christoph Frauendorf in Amt Torgau because of the existing deposits is still on record about him.

== Work (selection) ==
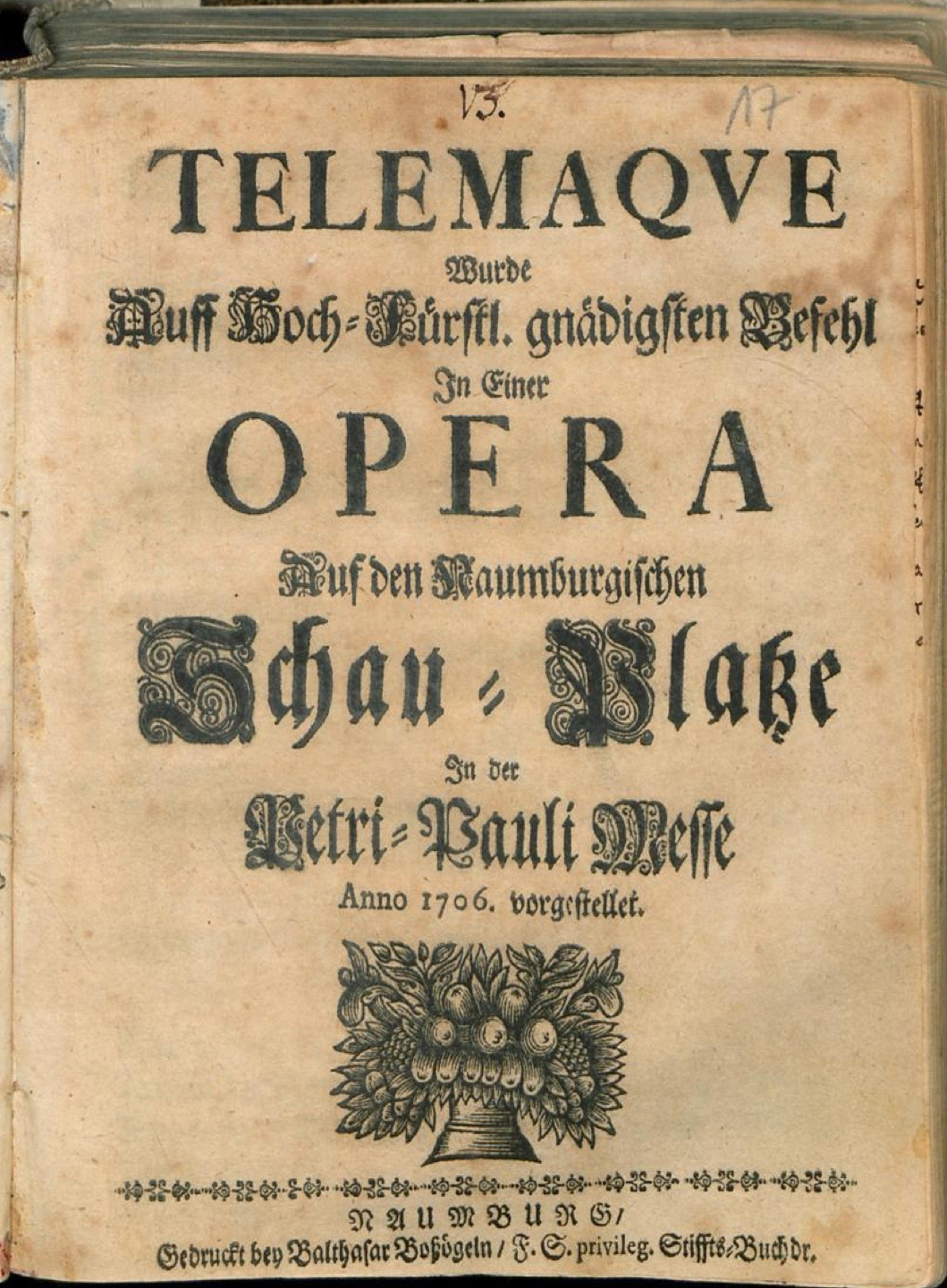
Title page of the libretto of the opera Telemaque, Naumburg 1706

- Laurus Liliis Convallium Et Hyacinthis Interstincta, Palladio Saxo, Hoc Est ... Dn. Sophiae Mariae, Natae Landgrafiae Hassiae ... Elocatae Ducis Saxoniae ... Et Natali Eius Auspicatissimo Ipsis Nonis Maii, A.O.R. MDCLXXXII ... dedicata, Halle, 1682.
- Disp. mor. de moralitate voti Iephtae. Georgius, Leipzig, 1686.
- Exercitatio acad. de divina maiestatis origine. Georgius, Leipzig, 1687.
- De Epistola Christi Ad Agbarum, Speciatim contra Theologum Anglum, Guil. Cave. Georgius, Leipzig, 1693.
- Diss. inaug. de coacto fratris pro fratre testimonio. Meyerus, Altdorf, 1695.
- Das verstöhrte Troja In einem Singe-Spiele vorgestellet/ Auf dem Grossen Braunschweigischen Theatro. Und Dem ... Hrn. Anthon Ulrichen/ Hertzogen zu Braunschw. und Lüneburg. Unterthänigst gewidmet. Braunschweig, 1703.
- Telemaque Wurde Auff Hoch-Fürstl. gnädigsten Befehl Jn Einer Opera Auf den Naumburgischen Schau-Platze Jn der Petri-Pauli Messe Anno 1706 vorgestellet. Boßögel, Naumburg, 1706.
- Schwedische und Sächsische Staats-Cantzley, in welcher alle diejenigen geheimen und andern Schriften, welche von der Zeit an, da der König in Schweden in Sachsen gerucket, bis an seinen Abmarch zwischen beyden Höfen gewechselt worden unverfälscht zu finden. Zur geheimen Erläuterung des damaligen Zustandes der Historie und des Landes von Sachsen. Riegel, Nürnberg, 1708.
- Trauer- Und Todes-Gedancken Uber den Seeligen Hintritt Der Wohl-Edlen, Viel Ehr- und Tugend-begabten Frauen, Frauen Katharinen Elisabeth, geb. Frentzelin Des Weyland Wohl-Edlen, Groß-Achtbarn und Wohlgelahrten Herrn, Hrn. Friedrich Johanemanns Königl.-Pohln. und Chur-Fürstl. Sächß. wohl-meritirten Schul-Verwalters und Ambts-Steuer-Einnehmers zur Pforta, Wie auch E. Hoch-Edlen und Hoch-Weisen Raths zu Naumburg Ober-Cämmerers Hinterlassenen Frau Witben, als Dieselbe Den 15. Julii 1714. zu Ihrer Ruhe-Städte begleitet wurde, Nachgesetzter vornehmen Gönner, Freunde und Anverwandten. Brühl, Weißenfels, 1714.
- Telemachus und Calypso : Jn einer Opera vorgestellet auf dem grossen Braunschweigischen Theatro Jn der Laurentii-Messe Anno 1717., Bartsch, Wolfenbüttel. 1717.
- Telemach und Calypso, wurde ... an dem Carneval, welcher in d. 1722. Jahr zu Christian-Erlang gehalten ward ..., in e. musicalischen Opera auf d. grossen Theatro daselbst unterthänigst vorgestellet. Lober, Bayreuth, 1722.
