= Delphin Strungk =

German composer and organist

Delphin Strungk (or Strunck) (1600 or 1601 – 12 October 1694) was a German composer and organist associated with the North German school.

The first that is known of him is in 1630, when he became organist of the Marienkirche in Wolfenbüttel; this was followed by an appointment at the court in Celle from 1632 to 1637. In May 1637, he moved to Brunswick, where he was to remain until his death, to take up the post of organist of the St. Martini church; he also played at other local churches.

His surviving compositions include six pieces of church music for voices and instruments, now in the collection of the Herzog August Bibliothek, Wolfenbüttel and the Staatsbibliothek zu Berlin Preussischer Kulturbesitz. There are also surviving organ works; six chorale preludes and fantasias of a high quality survive in tablature, and are now in the collection of the Ratsbücherei, Lüneburg. These have been published in Die Orgel, II/12 (Lippstadt, 1960); Alte Meister des Orgelspiels, ed. K. Straube (Leipzig, 1904); Seasonal Chorale Preludes with Pedals I, ed. C. H. Trevor (London, 1963); and Corpus of Early Keyboard Music XXIII (1973).

His son Nicolaus Adam Strungk was an opera composer.

== Scores ==
- Free scores by Delphin Strungk at the International Music Score Library Project (IMSLP)
