= Helmut Degen =

German composer

Helmut Degen (born 14 January 1911 in Aglasterhausen – died 2 October 1995 in Trossingen) was a German composer.

Degen studied composition with Wilhelm Maler and Philipp Jarnach; and score and instrumentation with Ernst Gernot Klussmann at the Rheinische Musikschule in Cologne and the University of Bonn, writing his dissertation on Baroque librettist Friedrich Christian Bressand. He later taught theory at the Duisburg Conservatory and later at the Hochschule für Musikerziehung in Trossingen, becoming a professor in 1954.

His works include educational chamber music in modern style. His style resembles Hindemith and uses methods similar to 12-tone composition.

== Selected works ==
- Concerto for organ and orchestra (1938)
- Sonata for viola and piano (1940); Willy Müller, Süddeutscher Musikverlag
- Kleine Weihnachtsmusik (Short Christmas Music) for strings and woodwinds (1942); P. J. Tonger
- Der flanderische Narr, Ballet (1942)
- Kleines Konzert (Short Concerto) for violin and chamber orchestra (1944–1945)
- Kammersinfonie (Chamber Symphony) for small orchestra (1947); Schott
- Konzert Etüden (Concert Etudes) (1948); Schott
- Suter, Oratorio (1950)
- Unisono-Stücke for violin, or viola, or cello solo, or unison ensemble (1950); Heinrichshofen's Verlag
- Stück from Die grosse Reihe for viola solo (1954); Willy Müller, Süddeutscher Musikverlag
- Handbuch der Formenlehre: Grundsätzliches zur musikalischen Formung (1957); Bosse
- 10 Stücke (10 Pieces) for violin and viola; Willy Müller, Süddeutscher Musikverlag
- Johannes-Passion for soprano, tenor and chorus a cappella (1961–1962)
- Sonata for flute and viola (1963); N. Simrock
- Capriccio for accordion and cello (1970)
- Genesis-Offenbarung, Oratorio (1973)
- Metamorphosen for cello and piano (1980)
- Concerto for 12 cellos (1982)
- Capriccio scherzando for piano
- Serenade for string orchestra
- String quintet for 2 violins, 2 violas and cello
- String quintet for 2 violins, viola and 2 cellos
- String sextet for 2 violins, 2 violas and 2 cellos
- String quartet
