= Gottfried Grünewald =

German organist and composer (1673–1739)

Gottfried Grünewald (also Grunewald; baptised 15 October 1673 (Note: Another source gives a birth year of 1675) – 19 December 1739) was a German operatic bass, harpsichordist, pantaleon virtuoso and composer.

== Life ==
Grünewald was baptised in Seifhennersdorf near Zittau, on 15 October 1673. He studied music under his father, a school teacher, and attended the Zittau Gymnasium as a student. In 1696 he began studying at Leipzig University. During his studies, he performed as a bass singer at the Thomaskirche and in various operas. From 1703 he was a bass singer and composer at the Oper am Gänsemarkt in Hamburg. Two of his operas were performed there with him in the title roles: Der ungetreue Schäfer Cardillo in 1704 and Germanicus in 1705 which had received its world premiere in Leipzig the previous year.

From 1709, he worked as vice kapellmeister at the court of Johann Georg, Duke of Saxe-Weissenfels, where he married Johanna Rosina Krieger, the daughter of Johann Philipp Krieger. Together, they had ten children. From 1711 until his death in 1739, Grunewald served in Dermstadt as vice kapellmeister under Ernest Louis, Landgrave of Hesse-Darmstadt. His good friend Christoph Graupner served at the same court as kapellmeister and the two of them shared the composition duties, alternately composing cantata cycles for the Royal Chapel. Graupner also composed a large number of bass cantatas for Grunewald to sing.

Grunewald was also proficient on the pantaleon (a large hammered dulcimer, popular in the 18th century) and toured parts of Germany giving concerts on the instrument.

== Works ==
His works included numerous cantatas, the operas Der ungetreue Schäfer Cardillo (1703, lost), given in Leipzig, and Die erretete Unschuld, oder Germanicus (1704, also lost) as well as the only surviving work: 7 Partiten for harpsichord which are written in the style of the period. Everything else is lost, and most likely burned on the composer's request.

== Notes and references ==
Sources

- Bill, Oswald (2020). "Grünewald, Gottfried". Darmstadt Stadtlexikon (in German).
- Kutsch, K.-J.; Riemens, Leo (2012). "Grünewald, Gottfried". Großes Sängerlexikon (in German) (4th ed.). Walter de Gruyter. p. 1863. ISBN 978-3-59-844088-5.
