= Der neumodische Liebhaber Damon =

- Opera by Georg Philipp Telemann
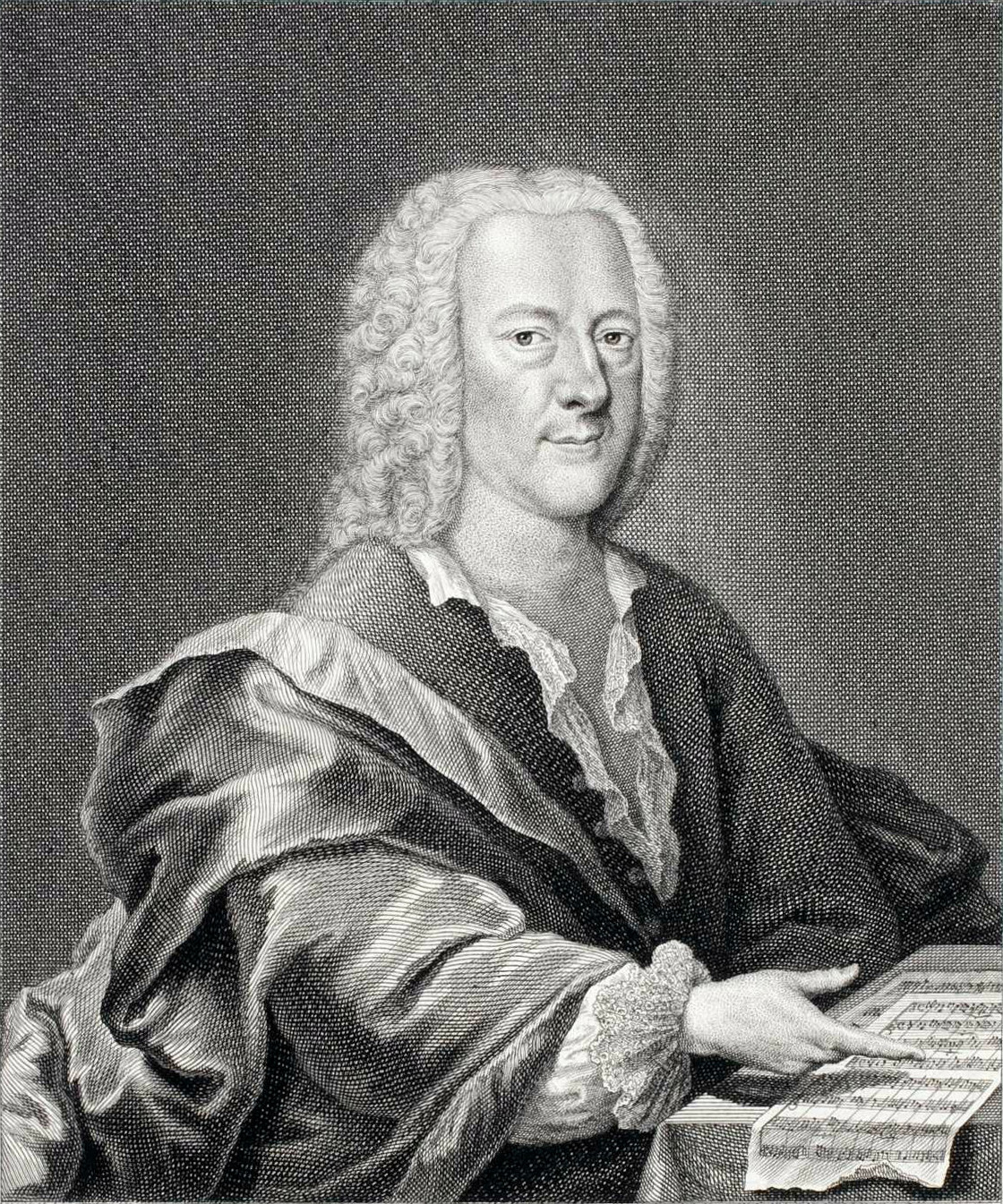
- The composer, c. 1745
- Other title: Die Satyrn in Arcadien
- Language: German
- Premiere: 30 August 1724 (revised version); Oper am Gänsemarkt, Hamburg

Der neumodische Liebhaber Damon, oder Die Satyrn in Arcadien (TWV 21:8), Leipzig 1719, Hamburg 1724, is a comic Arcadian German-language opera in three acts by Telemann.

The first performance was one of the twenty operas, almost all entirely lost, that Telemann wrote in his student days for the young Leipzig Opera. The second revised version of the opera was Telemann's first offering for the reopening of the Hamburg Opera at the Oper am Gänsemarkt, after having succeeded Reinhard Keiser in running the opera in the previous year. The Hamburg performance took place on 30 August 1724.

The form of the opera contains conservative elements - such as a strophic variation aria.
