= Emma und Eginhard =

- Singspiel by Georg Philipp Telemann
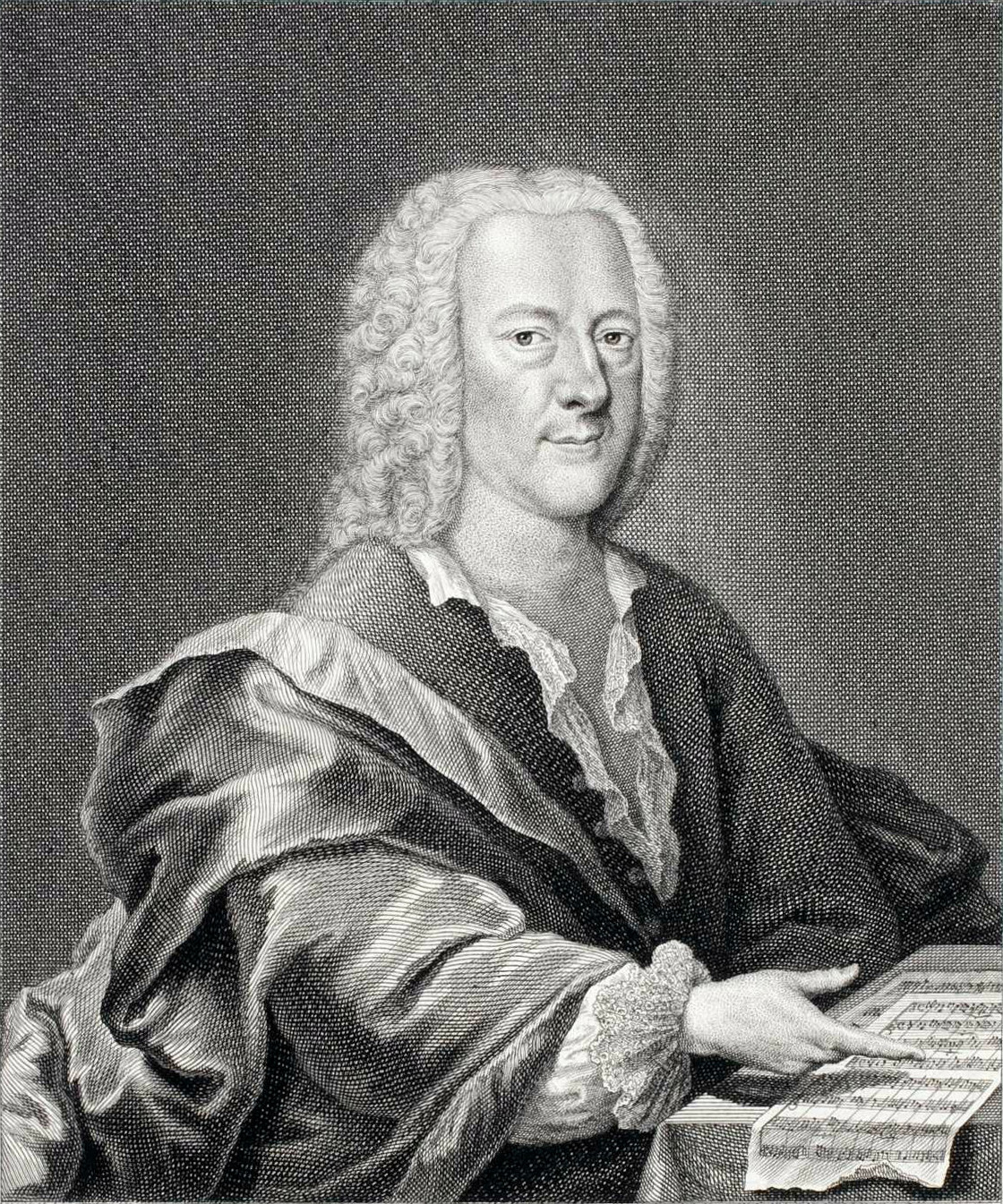
- The composer, c. 1745
- Librettist: Christoph Gottlieb Wend
- Language: German
- Premiere: 1728; Oper am Gänsemarkt, Hamburg

Emma und Eginhard, oder Die Last-tragende Liebe, TWV 21:25, is a German Singspiel in three acts by Georg Philipp Telemann performed at the Oper am Gänsemarkt in Hamburg in 1728. The librettist was Christoph Gottlieb Wend.

The opera's overture is also played as a violin concerto in A minor.

== Edition ==
- Georg Philipp Telemann: Die last-tragende Liebe or Emma und Eginhard, Urtext edition, ISMN 979-0006497942

== Recordings ==
- Selected arias: "Das Auge starrt, die Lippen beben"; "Erscheine bald du, Irrlicht meiner Sinne"; "Steckt Mars den Degen ein, so wetzt Cupido Pfeile" from Telemann, album by Nuria Rial (Deutsche Harmonia Mundi, 2011, Cat. No: 88697922562)
