= Pantalon =

Very large type of hammered dulcimer

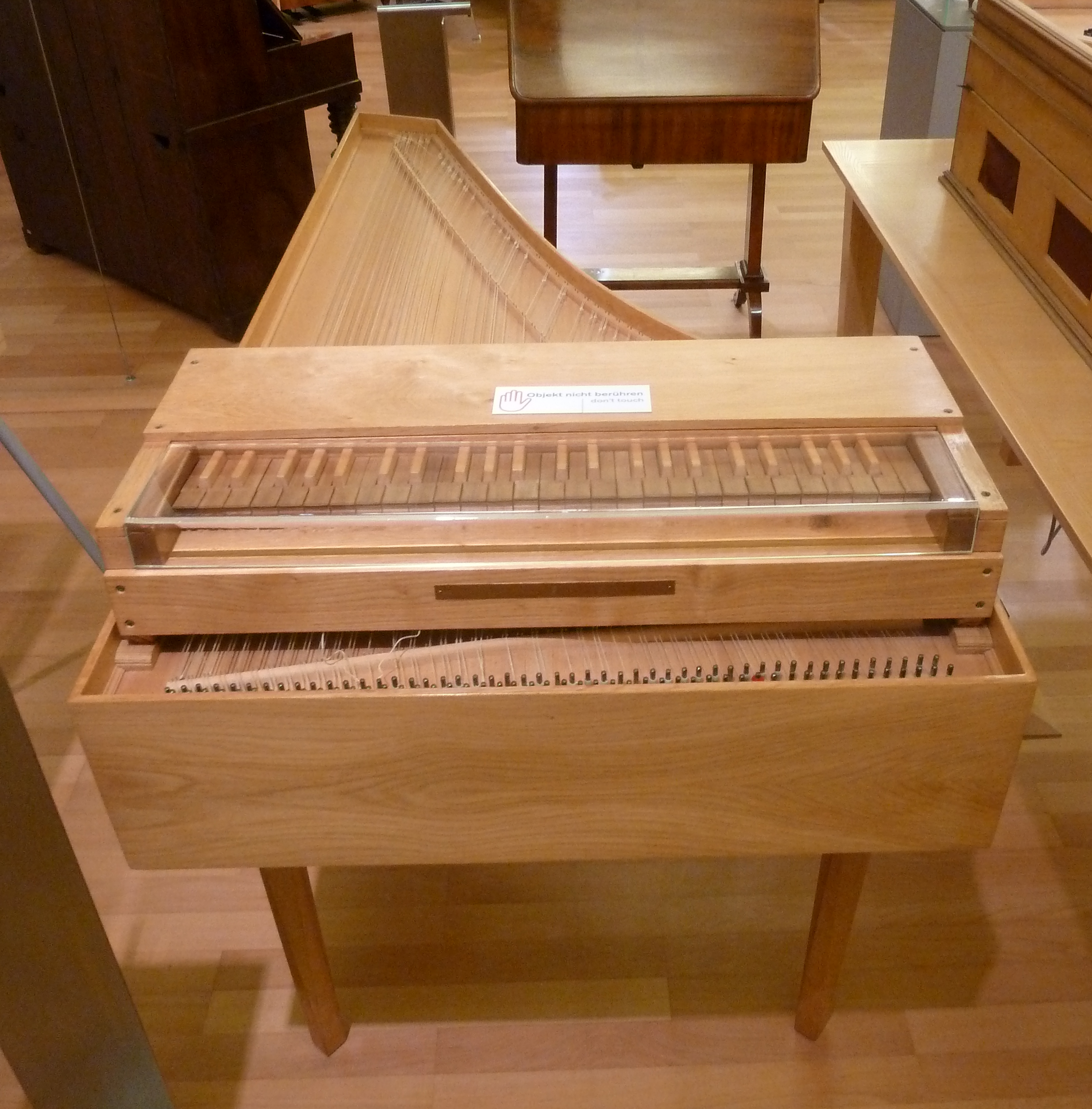
A pantalon reconstruction.

The pantalon (or pantaleon) was a very large type of hammered dulcimer, invented by Pantaleon Hebenstreit in the early 18th century and briefly popular in France and Germany.

== Description ==
The pantalon was a very large dulcimer with a double sounding board, approximately 6 ft (2 m) long, with about 200 strings of both gut and metal, some double- or triple-strung. It had no dampers, so the strings vibrated sympathetically, giving a rich resonating tone that was quite novel at the time and made a noticeable stir; the lack of dampers, however, made articulation difficult.

Few instruments were constructed and very few survive. Hebenstreit and his two best pupils Maximilian Hellmann and Johann Baptist Gumpenhuber were essentially the only virtuoso players of the instrument. However, it was well known in French and German musical circles of the early 18th century, and Hebenstreit gained fame and fortune playing it.

Hebenstreit named the instrument after himself. Glowing reviews of its qualities appear in the writings of a number of prominent commentators of the day, such as Johann Kuhnau. The instrument died out with Hebenstreit's retirement, but the idea of allowing sympathetic resonance from undamped strings was adopted into mechanisms that would disengage the dampers in various ways on early keyboard instruments such as the clavichord, called "pantalon stops".

== Compositions ==
Compositions made for Hellmann include three by Caldara, eight by Johann Georg Reutter and an aria by Johann Joseph Fux in the Festa teatrale Giunone placata (1725).

== Notable players ==
- Gottfried Grünewald
