= Sardanapalus (opera) =

Opera by Christian Ludwig Boxberg

Sardanapalus is a 1698 opera by Christian Ludwig Boxberg.

== Recording ==
- Sardanapalus Jan Kobow, Rinnat Moriah, Franz Vitzthum, Sören Richter, United Continuo Ensemble, Bernhard Epstein
