= Germanicus (opera) =

- Opera by Georg Philipp Telemann
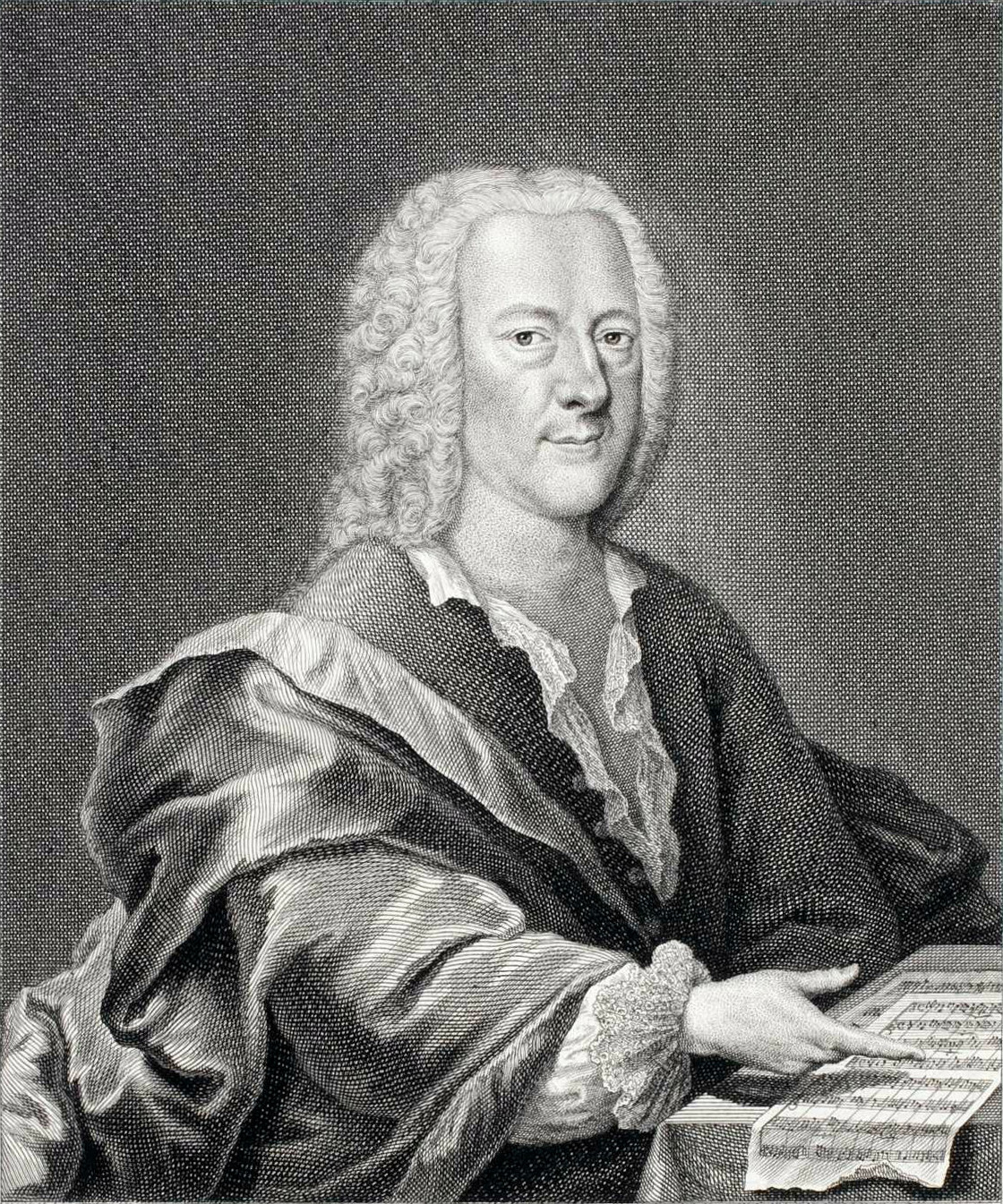
- The composer, c. 1745
- Librettist: Christine Dorothea Lachs
- Language: German
- Based on: Life of Germanicus
- Premiere: 1704; Oper am Brühl, Leipzig

Germanicus is an opera by Georg Philipp Telemann, to a libretto in German by the poet Christine Dorothea Lachs, fourth daughter of Nicolaus Adam Strungk of Dresden. The opera was written in 1704 and revised in 1710. It was performed in 1704, and then again Hamburg in 1706, the opera written during his time in Leipzig as a student. The plot centers around the love triangle between the Germanic tribal leader Arminius, Agrippina the Younger, and Claudius.

It is supposedly one of the twenty operas that Telemann wrote for the opera house in the Oper am Brühl in Leipzig.

The opera was believed lost until 45 arias were discovered in a Frankfurt archive by Michael Maul. The opera was premiered with spoken text between arias at the Bachfest Leipzig 2007 and at the 2010 Magdeburg Telemann Festival under conductor Gotthold Schwarz. A recording was released by cpo in 2011.

== Recording ==
- Gotthold Schwarz (conductor), Germanicus, Label: CPO, DDD, 2010, 3 CDs. With Olivia Stahn, Elisabeth Scholl, Matthias Rexroth, Henryk Böhm, Tobias Berndt, Sächsisches Barockorchester, ASIN: B005UU066S
