= Friedrich Christian Bressand =

German poet and librettist

Friedrich Christian Bressand (c.1670 – 11 April 1699) was a Baroque German poet and opera librettist.

== Life ==
Bressand was born in Durlach. His brief life was spent predominantly in the service of German courts. He was born the son of the Margrave of Durlach's personal cook, but was forced to flee the town when it was destroyed by French troops in 1689. He found refuge through family connections at the court of Duke Anton Ulrich of Brunswick-Wolfenbüttel, a patron of opera who built an opera house, the Opernhaus am Hagenmarkt, in 1690. The house stood until 1861.

The Duke himself wrote opera librettos and enlisted Bressand to assist him in the organization of theatrical events. They started with German arrangements of French and Italian operas and Bressand soon fashioned a significant number of his own librettos, which evidently became popular with composers, given the number of composers who set his texts. His texts were even performed at the richly-furnished Hamburg opera, the Oper am Gänsemarkt, alongside those of such poets as Christian Heinrich Postel (1658–1705). After ten years of productive work, he died suddenly in Wolfenbüttel at the age of 29.

== Bibliography ==
- Gerhard Dünnhaupt: "Friedrich Christian Bressand (1670?–1699)", in: Personalbibliographien zu den Drucken des Barock, vol. 2. Hiersemann, Stuttgart 1990, pp. 795–815. ISBN 3-7772-9027-0
- Helmut Degen: Friedrich Christian Bressand. Dissertation. Rostock 1934
- Gustav Friedrich Schmidt: Neue Beiträge zur Geschichte der Musik und des Theaters am Herzoglichen Hofe zu Braunschweig-Wolfenbüttel. Munich 1929
- Sara Smart: Doppelte Freude der Musen. Wiesbaden 1990
- Paul Zimmermann (1903). "Bressand, Friedrich Christian" . Allgemeine Deutsche Biographie (in German). Vol. 47. Leipzig: Duncker & Humblot. pp. 226–228.
