= Georg Caspar Schürmann =

German Baroque composer

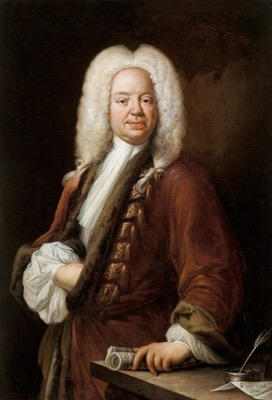
Georg Caspar Schürmann, painting by Johann Conrad Eichler (1731)

Georg Caspar Schürmann (1672 (or early 1673), in Idensen bei Neustadt am Rübenberge – 25 February 1751, in Wolfenbüttel) was a German Baroque composer. His name also appears as Schurmann and in Hochdeutsch as Scheuermann.

== Life ==
Schürmann studied music, including voice, in his native Lower Saxony. By 1693, he was singing at the Oper am Gänsemarkt as a young alto. In 1694 he composed a cantata for the inauguration of the Castle Salzdahlum in Wolfenbüttel. In 1697, he went to Lüneburg (about 50 km southeast of Hamburg) for a guest performance. His singing there so impressed Duke Anton Ulrich of Brunswick-Wolfenbüttel that the Duke hired him on the spot. From 1702 to 1707 he was principal conductor and composer for the Meiningen Court Orchestra. In 1707 Schürmann officially succeeded Reinhard Keiser as Cammer-Componist (court composer). He served the court of Brunswick, with but a few brief interruptions, for 54 years until he died at the age of 79.

== Work ==
Schürmann wrote over thirty operas, many of which have not survived. His music was characterized by harmonic richness, careful contrapuntal elaboration, flexible handling of form and theatrically effective delineation of characters. Among his operas were:

- Salomon, in einem Singespiel. (Libretto: Anton Ulrich (Braunschweig-Wolfenbüttel)). Wolfenbüttel, o.J. [1697?]
- Daniel, in einem Sing-Spiel. (Libretto: Christian Knorr von Rosenroth). Braunschweig 1701
- Telemaque. (Libretto: Johann Beer). Naumburg 1706
- L'amor insanguinato oder Holofernes. (Libretto: Joachim Beccau). Braunschweig 1716.
- Die Pleiades oder das Siebengestirne. (Libretto: Friedrich Christian Bressand). Braunschweig 1716 (und Wolfenbüttel 1735)
- Der Edelmühtige Porsenna. (Libretto: Friedrich Christian Bressand). Wolfenbüttel 1718
- Heinrich der Vogler. (Libretto: Johann Ulrich König). Wolfenbüttel 1718 (u.ö.)
- Die getreue Alceste in einer Opera. (Libretto: Johann Ulrich König). Braunschweig 1719 (u.ö.)
- Ludovicus Pius oder Ludewig der Fromme. (Louis the Pious). Braunschweig 1726
- Clelia, in einer Opera vorgestellet. (Libretto: Friedrich Christian Bressand). Braunschweig 1730
- Procris und Cephalus, in einer Opera. (Libretto: Friedrich Christian Bressand). Wolfenbüttel 1734

== Sources ==
- Georg Caspar Schürmann, entry in the German Wikipedia
- Liner notes by Bernhard Schrammek for Ouvertüren: Music for the Hamburg Opera performed by the Akademie für Alte Musik Berlin (Harmonia Mundi HMC 901852)
