= Pantaleon Hebenstreit =

German musician (1668–1750)

- Born: 27 November 1668; Kleinheringen, Naumburg; or Eisleben (sources differ)
- Died: 15 May 1750 (aged 81); Dresden, Electorate of Saxony
- Occupations: Dancing master (teacher); musician; composer
- Known for: Inventing the pantalon, a keyboard instrument

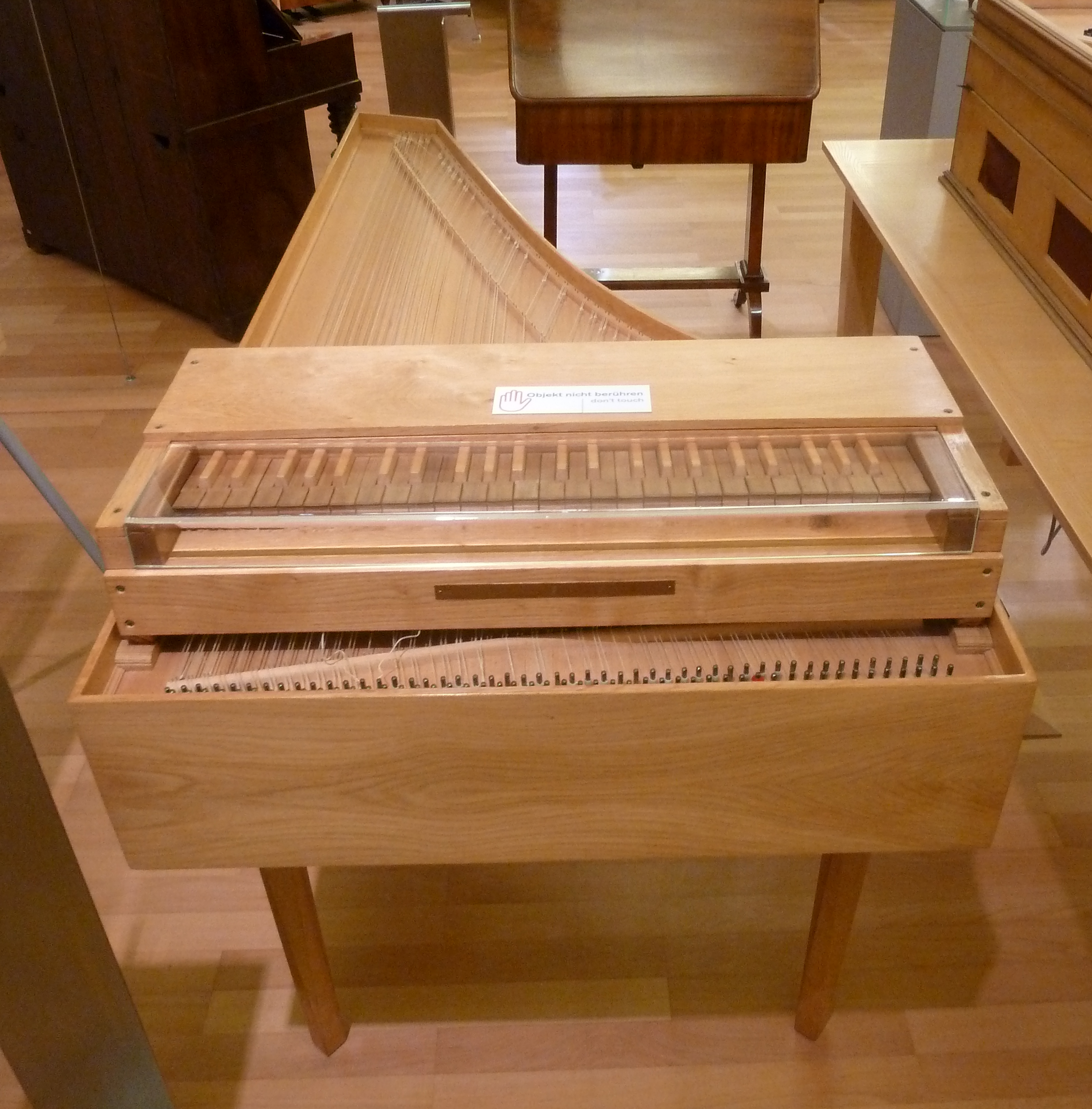
A pantalon reconstruction

Pantaleon Hebenstreit (27 November 1668 – 15 November 1750) was a German dance teacher, musician and composer.

Today his notability rests primarily on the pantalon, a keyboard instrument which he invented and which subsequently came to be seen by some as a precursor of the modern pianoforte.

== Life ==
Hebenstreit was born in Eisleben, a short distance west of Leipzig, in 1668. His father, described in one source as a "Thürmer" (look-out man), died in 1678. On 29 January 1691 Hebenstreit entered the University of Wittenberg. By 1697 he was employed in Leipzig as a violinist, keyboard musician and dancing master (i.e. teacher). It must have been at this time that, during one of his regular visits to Jean-Baptiste Volumier in Berlin, he is reported by Johann Kuhnau to have spent a lot of time practising his keyboard skills on an enlarged type of hammered dulcimer which he had constructed himself. In 1697 he was obliged to leave Leipzig in order to escape his creditors, and took a position as a private tutor in Merseburg, which gave him the opportunity to develop his instrument: shortly afterwards he was invited to demonstrate it to the court in Dresden. Hebenstreit was able to return to Leipzig, his debts apparently paid off.

Between 1698 and 1703 he was contracted by Johann Georg, Duke of Saxe-Weissenfels to work on the drama and music at the court of Weissenfels. In 1705 he travelled with his giant dulcimer to France. According to Johann Mattheson writing in his Critica musica, quoting a French source, it was during this visit that the French king Louis XIV was so impressed both with the instrument and with Hebenstreit's mastery of it that he rechristened it "Le Pantalon": the name stuck.

On returning from France, Hebenstreit set about finding a suitable court appointment in his home region. In 1707 he took a post as a musical director and dancing master in Eisenach at the court of Saxe-Eisenach. His virtuosity as a violinist was commended. In 1708 or 1709 Georg Philipp Telemann took a position at the same court, being appointed Kapellmeister in August 1709. Having been passed over for the top job, Pantaleon left the Eisenach Court soon afterwards, probably still in 1709. Surviving records leave little doubt about Telemann's own admiration for Pantaleon's exceptional dexterity as a keyboard and violin performer ("eine ungemeine Geschicklichkeit") which, writing in 1718, Telemann implied exceeded his own talent. Telemann himself left the Eisenach court in 1712.

On 11 May 1714 Hebenstreit accepted an invitation to take a position at the Electoral Court in Dresden, the principal court of Saxony. His annual remuneration was 1200 Thalers, described in sources as "unusually high" ("mit einem ungewöhnlich hohen Gehalt"). He was, according to court payroll records, in charge of chamber music. Johann Kuhnau, the man who preceded J. S. Bach as Thomaskantor in Leipzig, is on record with the view that Pantaleon Hebenstreit was well worth his salary, however.

Hebenstreit's duties in charge of court music included playing the organ in the Chapel Royal, but in 1733, now in his late 60s and with his eyesight beginning to fail, he passed responsibility for this aspect of his work over to his star pupil Johann Christoph Richter. Richter had already taken over some of his other court responsibilities including choir training, formally in 1729, and it appears that by now Hebestreit was reducing his workload. In 1740 he was appointed a privy councillor.

On 15 November 1750 Pantaleon Hebenstreit died. He was buried three days later in Dresden's Johanniskirche.

== Reputation ==
Although, three centuries later, the Pantalon which he invented is largely forgotten, it would be wrong to think that Hebenstreit's reputation, which extended far beyond the confines of the Holy Roman Empire, died with him. In 1772 the English musicologist Charles Burney spotted the "famous Pantalon" in the house of Christian Sigmund Binder, who had succeeded Richter as head of court music. It was explained that the Duke felt unable to "let the instrument go". Hebenstreit's most notable pupils were the two Viennese Pantaleonists Johann Baptist Gumpenhuber and Maximilian Hellmann.

In May 1772, a Mr Noel and his father performed daily concerts on a Pantaleon at the York House in Bath, Somerset.
