= Nicolaus Adam Strungk =

German composer and violinist

Nicolaus Adam Strungk (christened 15 November 1640 in Braunschweig – 23 September 1700 in Dresden) was a German composer and violinist.

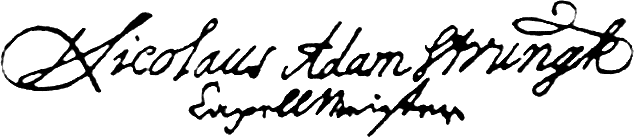

== Life ==
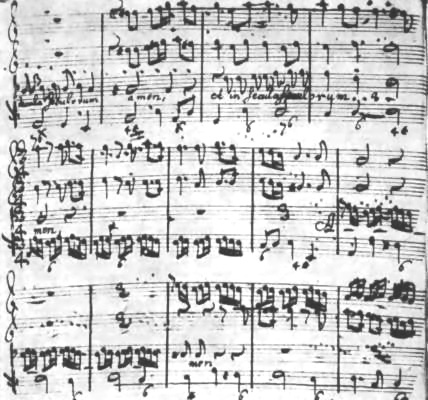
Original manuscript of Strungk's Laudate Pueri

Nicolaus Adam was the son of the organist Delphin Strungk. He studied organ under his father, then at the University of Helmstedt. From 1660 he studied violin with Nathanael Schnittelbach, performing for the Duke of Wolfenbüttel, and Kaiser Leopold I in Vienna. From 1665 he was chamber musician in the service of Prince Johann Friedrich in Hanover.

In 1679 Strungk became director of the Hamburger Ratsmusik. In 1688 he succeeded Christian Ritter as deputy Kapellmeister and organist in Dresden, where in 1693 he succeeded Christoph Bernhard as Hofkapellmeister. He left after three years, in 1696, to take up directorship of the Leipzig Opera. He died of fever („am hitzigen Fieber“) a few years later.

His fourth daughter, Dorothea Christine Lachs, was a noted poet and author of the libretto to Telemann's Germanicus.

== Works ==
Strunck's surviving keyboard compositions, two ricercars and seven capriccios, were composed in Rome and Vienna between 1683 and 1686. They were written in a strictly contrapuntal style with two or three sections, each having a different subject. He also composed cantates.

Strungk composed several operas for Hamburg and Leipzig:

- Der glückselig steigende Sejanus (1678)
- Der unglückselig fallende Sejanus (1678)
- Die liebreiche, durch Tugend und Schönheit erhöhte Esther (1680)
- David oder Der königliche Sclave (1680)
- Die drei Töchter Cekrops (1680)
- Alceste (Hamburg, 1680) (possibly by Johann Wolfgang Franck)
- Semele (1681)
- Theseus (1683)
- Semiramis (1683)
- Florette (1683)
- Jupiter und Alcmena (Leipzig, 1696)
- Phocas (Leipzig, 1696)
- Pyrrhus und Demetrius (Leipzig, 1696)
- Orion (Leipzig, 1697)
- Scipio und Hannibal (Leipzig, 1698)
- Ixion (Leipzig, 1699)
- Agrippina (Leipzig, 1699)
- Erechtheus (Leipzig, 1700)

== Recordings ==
- Nicolaus Adam Strungk: Ich ruf zu dir, Herr Jesu Christ Maria Zedelius, soprano (11:09) on De Profundis - German Baroque cantatas with Heinrich Schütz: Erbarm dich mein. Franz Tunder: An Wasserflüssen Babylon; Ach Herr, lass deine lieben Engelein. Nicolaus Bruhns: De profundis clamavi. Matthias Weckmann: Wie liegt die Stadt so wüste. Michael Schopper, Musica Antiqua Köln dir. Reinhard Goebel.1985
- Nicolaus Adam Strungk: Complete organ works (plus works by Delphin Strunck, Christian Flor, Dietrich Meyer, Johann Decker, Marcus Olter) Friedhelm Flamme. 2010 / 2013
