= La guirlande =

Opera by Jean-Philippe Rameau

- Opera by Jean-Philippe Rameau
- Title page
- Librettist: Jean-François Marmontel
- Language: French
- Premiere: 21 September 1751; Paris Opera

La guirlande (full name: La guirlande, ou Les fleurs enchantées) is an opera by the French composer Jean-Philippe Rameau with a libretto by Jean-François Marmontel. It takes the form of an acte de ballet (a one-act opera with many dance movements). It debuted on 21 September 1751 at the Paris Opéra.

The primary theme is faithfulness, as shown by the characters of two shepherds. The story occurs in Arcadia, an idealized area of Greece that was a popular setting in the pastoral literature of the time.

== Performance history ==
La guirlande was first performed on 21 September 1751 at the Paris Opéra along with François Rebel and François Francœur's Les génies tutélaires and an act ("Les sauvages") taken from Rameau's opéra-ballet, Les Indes galantes. It was a great success.

This was the first of Rameau's stage works to be revived in the modern era, when it was staged by the Schola Cantorum de Paris on 22 June 1903. After witnessing this performance, Debussy declared, "Vive Rameau! à bas Gluck!" ("Long live Rameau! Down with Gluck!").

== Roles ==
Cast	Voice type	Premiere cast
Zélide	soprano	Marie Fel
Myrtil	haute-contre	Pierre Jélyotte
Hylas	bass	M. Person

== Synopsis ==
Zélide and her lover Myrtil have magic garlands which will stay fresh and green forever as long as they are faithful to each other. However, Myrtil falls for Amaryllis and his garland begins to wither and die. Regretting his action, Myrtil places his garland on the altar of Cupid in the hope that the god will rejuvenate it and save his chances with Zélide.

Zélide finds Myrtil's wilted garland and swaps it for her own. Upon returning to the altar, Myrtil finds his garland apparently restored to life. Praising the god, he returns to Zélide, only to find her with a withered garland of her own!

Myrtil refuses to believe Zélide has been unfaithful to him, despite evidence to the contrary. It is this forgiveness that eventually saves the day. Both the lovers' garlands are restored and they all live happily ever after.

== Music ==
La Guirlande was the first of several collaborations between Rameau and Marmontel. Many of the dances were borrowed from an earlier opera by Rameau, Le temple de la gloire (1745), which had been a failure.

The modern musicologist Cuthbert Girdlestone described the work thus: "It is a flawless piece of Dresden-china Rameau. This is not, in my eyes, the most precious kind of Rameau nor, fortunately, the commonest; indeed, it is seldom that he abides successfully within the slender framework of the bergerie; but he has done so here and the result is perfection, even though the perfection be of a modest order."

== Recordings ==
- La guirlande (with Zéphyre) Sophie Daneman (Zélide), Paul Agnew (Myrtil), François Bazola (Hylas), Chorus of Les Arts Florissants, Capella Coloniensis of WDR, conducted by William Christie (Erato, 2 CDs, 2001).
- La Guirlande (The Enchanted Flowers); with Claudie Saneva, soprano (Zélide); Jean-Jacques Lesueur, tenor (Mirtil); Versailles Chamber Orchestra, conducted by Bernard Wahl; chorus under the direction of Elisabeth Brasseur (Nonesuch Records] H-71023, LP, not dated).
