= Reinoud Van Mechelen =

Belgian operatic tenor (born 1987)

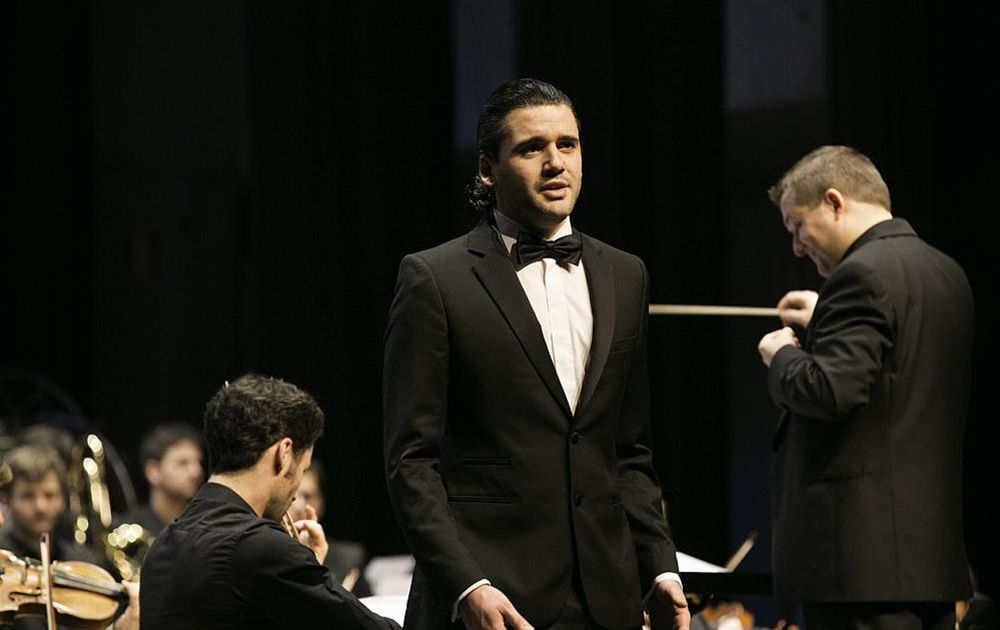
- Van Mechelen with 't Muziek Frascati and Kris Stroobants
- Born: Leuven; 29 May 1987 (age 38)
- Occupation: Tenor
- Organizations: A Nocte Temporis
- Website: www.reinoudvanmechelen.be/en

Reinoud Van Mechelen (born 1987) is a Belgian tenor from Flemish Brabant who has appeared internationally in both opera and concert. He has worked in historically informed performance, especially in French operas. He founded and directed the ensemble A Nocte Temporis.

== Life and career ==
Van Mechelen was born in Leuven on 29 May 1987. He began his musical career in the children's Clari Cantuli. He studied voice first at the Leuven Conservatory with Anne Mertens en Nicolas Achten, and studied further at the Royal Conservatory of Brussels with Lena Lootens, William Christie and Paul Agnew. He graduated in 2012, supervised by Dina Grossberger. He took masterclasses with Greta De Reyghere, Frédérick Haas, Claire Lefilliâtre, Jean-Paul Fouchécourt and Howard Crook.

Van Mechelen has worked both as soloist and singer in vocal ensembles. He first sang with Le Jardin des Voix of Christie and Agnew from 2011, and became a regular soloist of Les Arts Florissants. He has performed with ensembles such as Collegium Vocale Gent, Le Concert d'Astrée, Le Concert Spirituel, Hespèrion XXI, Le Poème Harmonique, Pygmalion, Ricercar Consort, and Les Talens Lyriques. He has appeared at the Rouen Opera, the Aix-en-Provence Festival and the Edinburgh Festival. He has collaborated with Nicolas Achten, Hervé Niquet, Christophe Rousset and Kris Stroobants.

He founded an ensemble, A Nocte Temporis, in 2016, focused on French music in historically informed performance. They have appeared at the Opéra de Lille, deSingel, Sint-Augustinuskerk in Antwerp, the Chapelle royale de Versailles, Wigmore Hall, the Bozar Centre for Fine Arts, Brussels, the Festival Oude Muziek in Utrecht and the Festival de Saintes at the Salle Gaveau. They recorded six albums, Erbame dich in 2016, Clérambault, cantates françaises in 2018, The Dubhlinn Gardens of Irish folk-songs and Dumesny, haute-contre de Lully both in 2019, Jéliote, haute-contre de Rameau in 2021, and Legros, haute-contre de Gluck in 2023.

== Roles ==
Van Mechelen's roles have included:

| Year | Opera | Role | Location |
|---|---|---|---|
| 2011 | Atys (Lully) | Zéphir | Opéra Royal de Versailles |
| 2012 | David et Jonathas (Charpentier) | | Aix-en-Provence Festival |
| 2013 | L'Egisto (Cavalli) | Lidio | Grand Théâtre de Luxembourg |
| 2014 | King Arthur (Purcell) | | La Monnaie |
| 2015 | Les fêtes vénitiennes (André Campra) | | Opéra-Comique |
| 2015 | Dardanus (Rameau) | Dardanus | Grand Théâtre de Bordeaux |
| 2016 | Zoroastre (Rameau) | Zoroastre | Festival Radio France Occitanie Montpellier, Aix-en-Provence Festival |
| 2017 | Médée (Charpentier) | Jason | Opernhaus Zürich |
| 2018 | Pygmalion (Rameau) | Pygmalion | Opéra de Dijon |
| 2018 | Die Zauberflöte (Mozart) | Tamino | La Monnaie |
| 2018 | Hippolyte et Aricie (Rameau) | Hippolyte | Berlin State Opera |
| 2019 | Armide (Lully) | Renaud | Théâtre des Champs-Élysées |
| 2019 | King Arthur | | Berlin State Opera |
| 2019/2020 | Les pêcheurs de perles (Bizet) | Nadir | Opéra de Toulon |
| 2020 | Hippolyte et Aricie | Hippolyte | Opéra-Comique |
| 2020 | L'incoronazione di Poppea (Monteverdi) | Arnalta | Théâtre des Champs-Élysées |
| 2020/2021 | La Belle Hélène (Offenbach) | Pâris | Opéra Royal de Wallonie |
| 2021 | Hippolyte et Aricie | Hippolyte | Berlin State Opera |
| 2021 | Titon et l'Aurore (Mondonville) | Titon | Opéra-Comique |
| 2021 | Didon (Piccinni) | Enée | Théâtre des Champs-Élysées |
| 2022 | Titon et l'Aurore | Titon | Opéra Royal de Versailles |
| 2022 | Così fan tutte (Mozart) | Ferrando | Opera Ballet Vlaanderen |
| 2022 | Platée (Rameau) | Mercure | Opéra national de Paris |
| 2022 | David et Jonathas | David | Opéra Royal de Versailles |
| 2022 | Zoroastre (Rameau) | Zoroastre | Théâtre des Champs-Élysées |
| 2023 | Médée | Jason | Berlin State Opera, Liceu |
| 2023 | Castor et Pollux (Rameau) | Castor | Théâtre des Champs-Élysées |
| 2023 | Dialogues des Carmélites (Poulenc) | Chevalier de la Force | Opéra Royal de Wallonie |
| 2023 | Les Boréades (Rameau) | Abaris | Théâtre des Champs-Élysées |
| 2024 | Médée | Jason | Opéra National de Paris, Teatro Real |
| 2024 | Iphigénie en Tauride (Campra) | Pylade | Théâtre des Champs-Élysées |
| 2024 | Atys (Lully) | Atys | Opéra Royal de Versailles |
| 2024 | Orphée et Eurydice (Gluck) | Orphée | Festival de Beaune |
| 2024 | Iphigénie en Tauride (Gluck) | Pylade | Opera Ballet Vlaanderen |
| 2025 | David et Jonathas | David | Opéra Royal de Versailles |
| 2025 | Persée (Lully) | Mercure | Théâtre des Champs-Élysées |
| 2025 | Castor et Pollux | Castor | Opéra national de Paris |
