= Guillemette Laurens =

French operatic mezzo-soprano (born 1957)

Guillemette Laurens (born 6 November 1957 in Fontainebleau, France) is a French operatic mezzo-soprano.

== Career ==
Laurens was born in Fontainebleau in 1957. She studied music theory, piano and chamber music at the Toulouse Conservatory. Guillemette trained at the Academy of Toulouse and debuted as Mother Goose in The Rake's Progress at Salle Favart at the age of 19, following this with Enrichetta in I puritani. She took part in the first modern revival and premiere recording of Lully's Atys (Cybèle) conducted by William Christie.

She has made recordings of medieval music, Monteverdi operas and of contemporary works.

In 1979, she participated in the founding of the ensemble Les Arts Florissants, the spearhead of the Baroque revival movement with which she worked intensively throughout the 1980s under the direction of Christie. She sang Phénice and the Naiad in Gluck's Armide at the Innsbruck Early Music Festival in 1985. As part of the Lille festival in October 1988 she sang the title role in Stradella's San Giovanni Battista.

She sang the title-role in a performance of Bononcini's II trionfo di Camilla in Utrecht in 1997, "projecting a wide range of emotion and taking lots of vocal risks, [Guillemette Laurens] excelled in the title role".

Laurens has taught at the conservatoires in Toulouse and Toulon and the Conservatoire Hector Berlioz in Paris. In 2002 she became a Chevalier dans l'ordre des Arts et des Lettres.

== Recordings ==
- Lully : Armide in the title role with the Collegium Vocale and Chapelle Royale under Philippe Herreweghe. Harmonia Mundi France 1995.
- Jean-Féry Rebel: Ulysse. Les Solistes du Marais: Guillemette Laurens, Stéphanie Révidat, Bertrand Chuberre, Bernard Deletré, Céline Ricci, Eugénie Warnier, Le Chœur du Marais, La Simphonie du Marais, conducted by Hugo Reyne. Recorded 9–10 July 2007. [Saint-Sulpice-le-Verdon, Vendée]: Conseil Général de la Vendée, Ⓟ 2007. Musiques à la Chabotterie 605003
- Saint-Saëns : Oratorio de Noël, Marie Paule Dotti, soprano, Guillemette Laurens, mezzo-soprano, Luca Lombardo, ténor, Nicolas Testé, basse, Francesco Cera, orgue, Coro della Radio Swizzera, Lugano, Orchestra della Swizzera Italiana, dir. Diego Fasolis. CD Chandos 2004
- Gossec : Le Triomphe de la République, ou Le Camp de Grand Pré, as the Aide-de-camp, I Barocchisti, conducted by Diego Fasolis. Chandos CD 2006
- Hahn : Ciboulette as Madame Grenu (DVD) starring Julie Fuchs with Accentus, l'Orchestre Symphonique de l'Opéra de Toulon, Laurence Equilbey - framusica (recorded at the Opéra-Comique, Paris, in February 2013)
