= Jephté =

1732 opera by Michel Pignolet de Montéclair

Jephté (Jephtha) is an opera by the French composer Michel Pignolet de Montéclair. It takes the form of a tragédie en musique in a prologue and five acts (because of its subject matter it was also styled a tragédie biblique). The libretto, by the Abbé Simon-Joseph Pellegrin, is based on the story of Jephtha from the Book of Judges. The oratorio was first performed at the Académie royale de musique, Paris on 28 February 1732. It was the first opera in France using a story from the Bible to appear on a public stage. Montéclair made revisions for revivals of the work in March 1732 and April 1737.

In 1735, the soprano who had premiered Iphise, Catherine-Nicole Lemaure, was forced to appear in that year's revival via threats of imprisonment if she would not do so; therefore, she intentionally bombed the performance and was booed at by the audience. She was detained overnight at For-l'Évêque, a Parisian prison, until she returned the next night to sing the role correctly.

== Roles ==
Role	Voice type	Premiere Cast
Jephté	bass	Claude-Louis-Dominique Chassé de Chinais
Iphise	soprano	Catherine-Nicole Le Maure
Ammon	haute-contre	Denis-François Tribou
Phinée	bass	Jean Dun
Abdon	haute-contre	M. Dumast
Almasie	soprano	Marie Antier
Abner	bass	M. Goujet
Élise	soprano	Mlle. Mignier

== Synopsis ==
=== Prologue ===
La Verité (Truth) tells the false pagan gods, Apollo, Venus and Polyhymnia to go to Elysium with their fellows, for their time is over. Verité thanks them for their service on Earth preparing the way for the worship of the true God. They leave, lamenting as to the end of the Golden Age.

=== Act One ===
The high priest Phinée chooses Jephté as leader of the Israelites as they prepare to attack the people of Ephraim. Jephté vows to God to sacrifice the first person he sees on his return from battle if he is victorious.

=== Act Two ===
The leader of the Ephraimites, Ammon, is a captive in Jephtha's palace. He refuses the urging of his follower, Abner, to escape because he has fallen in love with Jephtha's daughter, Iphise. Iphise guiltily confesses to her mother that she is in love with Ammon too. News arrives of Jephté's victory in battle.

=== Act Three ===
Jephté is horrified when the first person he sees as he arrives home is Iphise. He tells her of his vow and she prepares herself to be sacrificed, in spite of Ammon's entreaties.

=== Act Four ===
Iphise laments her fate but is resigned to death. Ammon swears he will lead his army to save her but she rejects his offer.

=== Act Five ===
The Israelites prepare the sacrifice in the temple. Ammon and his men burst in but they are struck by a bolt of fire from Heaven. The priest Phinéé declares God is pleased with Iphise and her life is spared.

== Recordings ==
- Jephté (first version), Jacques Bona, Sophie Daneman, Nicolas Rivenq, Claire Brua, Mark Padmore. Les Arts Florissants, conducted by William Christie (Harmonia Mundi, 1992)
- Jephté (last version 1737), Tassis Christoyannis, Judith Van Wanroij, Chantal Santon, Jeffery Campent, Purcell Choir, Orfeo Orchestra, conducted by György Vashegyi (Glossa 2019). Diapason d’or

== Sources ==
- The Viking Opera Guide ed. Holden (Viking, 1993)
- Le magazine de l'opéra baroque by Jean-Claude Brenac
- Casaglia, Gherardo (2005)."Jephté, 28 February 1732". L'Almanacco di Gherardo Casaglia (in Italian).
