= Bernard Deletré =

French opera singer

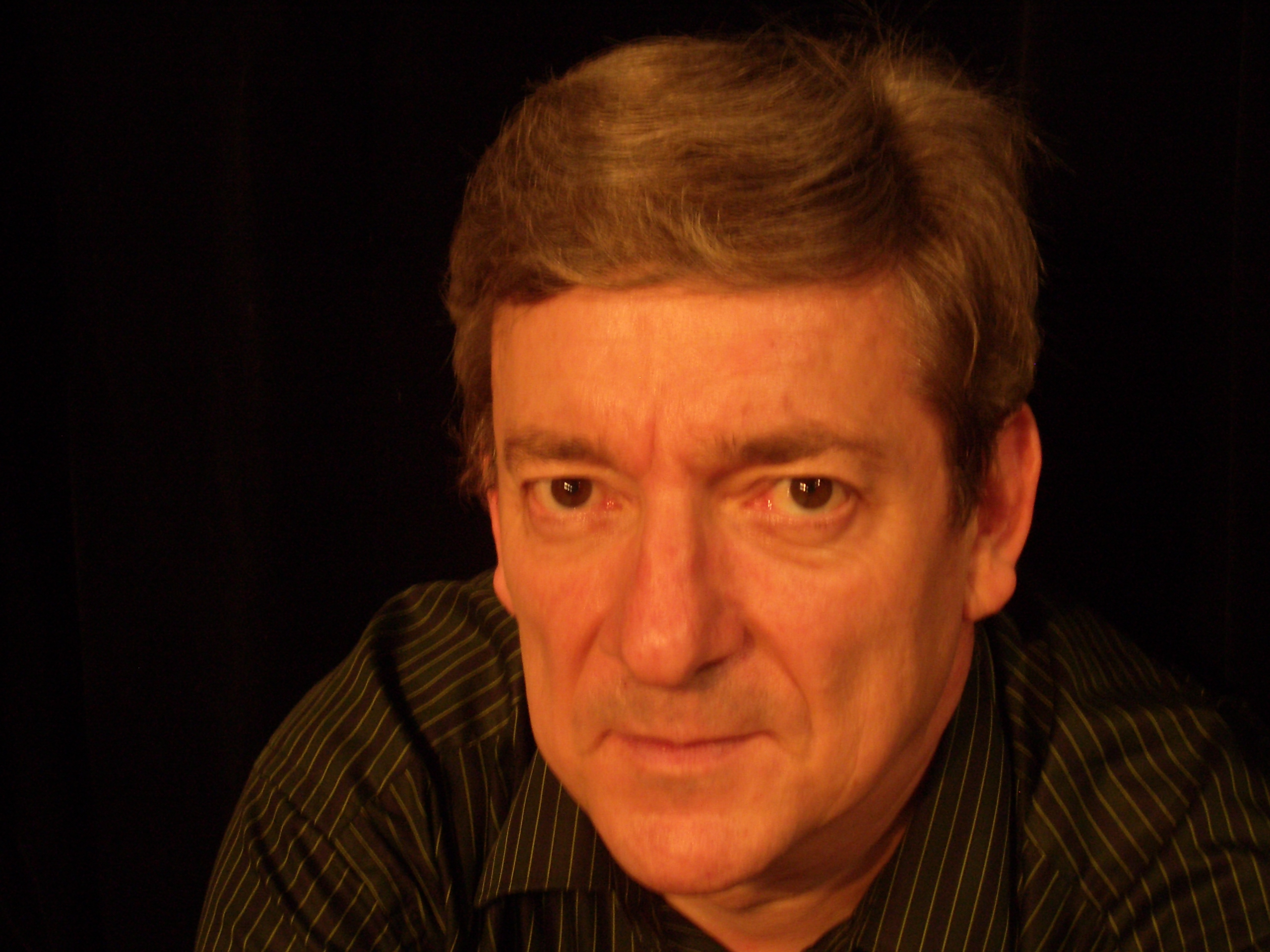
Bernard Deletré in 2007

Bernard Deletré is a French operatic bass-baritone.

== Life ==
After studying flute and singing in the North of France, followed by a first prize in singing at the Conservatoire de Paris, Deletré performed with the Groupe Vocal de France before embarking on a career as a soloist. He also performs contemporary music, with the Atelier Lyrique du Rhin or the Péniche Opéra.

He has sung Monteverdi, Purcell, Cesti, Cavalli, Lully, Charpentier, Rameau, Handel or Mozart, and also Verdi, Bellini, Massenet, Offenbach, Janáček. Deletré has performed in the United States and Canada (Glimmerglass Festival, Berkeley Festival, New York City Opera, Boston Early Music Festival, Opera Lafayette Washington DC, Florence Gould Hall of New-York, Festival de Musique ancienne de Montréal), and also collaborates with the Dutch national company Reisopera and the Grand Théâtre de Genève. Deletré worked extensively in the 1980s and 1990s with the ensemble of Baroque music Les Arts Florissants, led by William Christie.

He has participated in more than forty radio and CD recordings for Erato, EMI France, Adda, Opus 111, Naxos, Harmonia Mundi labels ...

He sings in both in the field of Baroque music and in the traditional opera repertoire: Giorgio in Bellini's I puritani in Nantes, Schlemil in Offenbach's The Tales of Hoffmann (Oeser version) in Geneva directed by Olivier Py, Dikoï in Janáček's Káťa Kabanová in Geneva, Bartolo in Mozart's The Marriage of Figaro in Tourcoing and Orléans, the priest in Janáček's The Cunning Little Vixen in Geneva, Arkel in Pelléas and Mélisande on tour in the Netherlands. In 2005, he wrote, directed, conducted and performed the show La Fontaine Incognito to music by Isabelle Aboulker for the Grand Théâtre de Limoges.

He was heard in Massenet's Hérodiade (Phanuel) and Bizet's Les pêcheurs de perles (Nourabad) at the Dorset Opera Festival, Massenet's Manon (comte des Grieux) on tour in the Netherlands, Cherubini's Médée (Creon) on tour in the Netherlands, Massenet's Don Quichotte (title role) and Gounod's Roméo et Juliette (Frère Laurent) in Limoges, Stravinsky's Pulcinella with the Orchestre national de Lille, a revival of The Tales of Hoffmann in Geneva, La Veuve et le Grillon, a work by Daniel Soulier, The Love for Three Oranges in Dijon and Limoges, Mozart's The Marriage of Figaro in Tourcoing and the Théâtre des Champs-Elysées, Busoni's Turandot Dijon, revival of Lully's Atys in Paris, Caen, Bordeaux, Versailles and New-York, Janáček's Jenůfa in Rennes and Limoges.

Among other projects, Deletré continues his collaboration with the American company Opera Lafayette: in the staging (and interpretation of the character of Baskir) for Félicien David's opera Lalla-Roukh in Washington and New York in January 2013, in the role of Don Alfonso in Cosi fan Tutte in October 2013 (reprise at the Château de Versailles on 30 January, 2 and 3 February 2014).

== Selected discography ==
=== Operas ===
- 2013: Lalla Roukh by Félicien David (Baskir)- Dir. Ryan Brown – Naxos
- 2007: Ulysse by Jean-Féry Rebel (Urilas) - Dir. Reyne - AC Production
- 2005: Isis by Lully (Jupiter) - Dir. Reyne - AC Production
- 2004: Orfeo by Monteverdi (Plutone) - Dir. Malgoire - Dynamic
- 2003: Agrippina by Haendel (Pallante) - Dir. Malgoire - Dynamic
- 1997: La Dame blanche by Boëldieu (Mac Irton) - Dir. Minkowski - EMI
- 1996: Calisto by Cavalli (Giove) - Dir. J.Glover - (live) BBC World
- 1995: Médée by Marc-Antoine Charpentier (Créon) - Dir. Christie - Erato
- 1993: Armide by Lully (Hidraot, Ubalde) - Dir. Herreweghe - Harm.M.
- 1992: Idoménée by André Campra (title role) Dir. Christie - Har.M.
- 1992: Le Baigneur by Denis Levaillant (title role) - Thésis
- 1991: Les Indes galantes by Rameau (Huascar, Alvar) - Dir. Christie Har.M.
- 1991: Orfeo by Rossi (Augure, Pluton) - Dir. Christie - Har.M
- 1990: Alcyone by Marin Marais (solos divers) - Dir. Minkowski - Erato
- 1990: Iphigénie en Aulide by Glück (Patrocle) - Dir. Gardiner - Erato
- 1989: Le Malade imaginaire Molière/Charpentier - Dir. Minkowski - Erato
- 1989: Platée by Jean-Philippe Rameau (Momus, Cithéron) - Dir. Minkowski - Erato
- 1989: The Fairy-Queen by Henry Purcell (Drunken poet, Corydon, Hymen) - Dir. Christie Har.M.
- 1988: David et Jonathas by Marc-Antoine Charpentier (Vx de Samuel, Achis) - Dir. Christie - Har.M.
- 1988: Giasone by Cavalli (Oreste) - Dir. R. Jacobs - Har.M.
- 1987: Comédie-ballets by Lully (various) Minkowski - Erato
- 1987: Atys by Jean-Baptiste Lully (Le Temps, Phobétor, Sangar) - Dir. Christie - Harmonia Mundi

=== Oratorios - various ===
- 1990 :
- 2005: L'Homme et son désir by Darius Milhaud - Orch. Nal de Lille - Dir. Jean-Claude Casadesus - Naxos
- 1996: La Fontaine-un portrait musical - Dir. Hugo Reyne - EMI
- 1996: Motets by Jean-Baptiste Lully (solo bass) - Dir. Niquet
- 1995: Messe du couronnement by Wolfgang Amadeus Mozart (solo bass) - Dir. Patrick Marco - Verany
- 1995: Thétis secular cantata by Jean-Philippe Rameau (solo bass) - Dir. Coin
- 1995: Motets by Pierre Robert (solo bass) - Dir. Schneebeli
- 1993: Salve Regina by Haydn (solo bass) - Dir. Gester - Opus 111
- 1992: Motets by Sébastien de Brossard (solo bass) - Dir. Gester - Opus 111
- 1991: Motets by Michel-Richard de Lalande (solo bass) - Dir. Colléaux - Erato
- 1990: Marc-Antoine Charpentier, Les Quatre Saisons H.335 - 338, Psaumes de David H.174, H.231, H.179, Le Parlement de Musique, clavecin, orgue et direction Martin Gester. CD Opus 111.
- 1990: "Motets" de Marc-Antoine Charpentier (solo bass) - Dir. Olivier Schneebeli - Adda
- 1989: Messe by de la Rue (ens.Cl.Janequin) - Har.M.
- 1989: Te Deum H.146 by Marc-Antoine Charpentier (solo bass) - Dir. Christie - Har.M.
- 1989 : Psaumes by Camille Saint-Saëns (solo bass) - Dir. Mercier - Adda
- 1983 : Antifonia by Scelsi (Groupe Vocal de France) - Dir. Tranchant

=== Videos, radio and television ===
- DVDs:
  - Agrippine by Haendel - Dir. Malgoire - 2004
  - Orfeo by Monteverdi - Dir Malgoire – 2006
  - Turandot by Busoni – Dir Kawka – 2011
  - Atys by Lully – Dir. Christie - 2011
- Radio :
  - L'homme qui avait... by Edith Lejet (Radio France)
  - Scherzo by Bruno Gillet (Radio France)
  - Barca di Venetia by Banchieri (Radio France/Péniche-opéra)
  - O comme eau by Claude Prey (Radio France/Péniche-opéra)
  - L'Arrache-Cœur by Elisabeth Sikora (Radio France)
  - Les Chambres de Cristal by Reibel (Radio France/Péniche-
- Television:
  - Le Malade Imaginaire Molière/Charpentier - La sept -
  - Fairy Queen by Purcell - La Sept -
  - Giasone by Cavalli - Télévision autrichienne -
  - Atys de Lully - La Sept -

== Stagings ==
- 1986 – Le Cirque volant by Jean Absil - Région Nord/Pas-de-Calais
- 1997 - Le joueur de flûte by Günther Kretzschmar - translation of the booklet, adaptation, staging - Région Nord/Pas-de-Calais
- 1998 - Le Paradis des chats by Vladimir Kojoukharov - adaptation, staging - Région Nord/Pas-de-Calais
- 2002 - La Querelle des muses by Alexandros Markeas - Script, libretto, staging - Région Nord/Pas-de-Calais
- 2005 - Atchafalaya by Isabelle Aboulker - staging - Région Nord/Pas-de-Calais, Montréal (Canada)
- 2005 - La Fontaine et le Corbeau by Isabelle Aboulker - Adaptation, staging - Région Nord/Pas-de-Calais, Dijon
- 2005 - La Fontaine incognito to a music by Isabelle Aboulker - Script, libretto, staging – Opéra-Théâtre de Limoges
- 2007 - Les enfants du Levant by Isabelle Aboulker - Adaptation, staging - Région Nord/Pas-de-Calais
- 2011 – Appointed director of the Atelier lyrique du conservatoire d'Hellemmes-Lille
- 2012 - Autour de Beaumarchais to musics by Mozart and Rossini and texts by Beaumarchais - script, staging – Atelier lyrique d'Hellemmes
- 2013 - Lalla-Roukh by Félicien David - Adaptation, staging - With the American company "Opera Lafayette" - Washington, New-York
- 2013 - Lalla-Roukh by Félicien David - Adaptation, staging - Atelier lyrique d'Hellemmes
- 2014 - Le Médecin malgré lui by Molière/Gounod - Adaptation, staging - Atelier lyrique d'Hellemmes
- 2015 - L'Etoile by Emmanuel Chabrier - Adaptation, staging - Atelier lyrique d'Hellemmes
- 2016 - La Fille de Madame Angot by Charles Lecocq - Adaptation, staging - Atelier lyrique d'Hellemmes
- 2016 - Une éducation manquée by Emmanuel Chabrier - Adaptation, staging - With the American company "Opera Lafayette" - Washington, New-York
- 2017 - La Flûte enchantée by Mozart - Adaptation, staging - Atelier lyrique d'Hellemmes.
- 2018 (project) - Véronique by André Messager - Adaptation, staging - Atelier lyrique d'Hellemmes.
