= Ulysse et Pénélope =

Opera by Jean-Féry Rebel

Ulysse or Ulysse et Pénélope (Ulysses or Ulysses and Penelope) is an opera by the French composer Jean-Féry Rebel, with a libretto by Henry Guichard. The story is based on a poetic reinterpretation of Homer's epic poem, Odyssey.

It was first performed at the Académie Royale de Musique (the Paris Opéra) on 21 January 1703. It takes the form of a tragédie en musique in a prologue and five acts.

== Plot ==
The opera begins with a prologue with a mandatory adoration of the king which, at the time of the opera, was Louis XIV. The formal opera begins in Ulysses's garden within his palace. His queen, Penelope, waits for his return from Troy. Her suitor, Urilas, on the other hand, cries at her inability to gain the king's attention. Meanwhile, a witch named Circe vows to bewitch Penelope into committing infidelity in order to steal away Ulysses from her. Through several different attempts, with Godly intervention, Ulysses and Penelope reunite, and Circe's plot is thwarted.

== Recording ==
- Ulysse. Les Solistes du Marais: Guillemette Laurens, Circé, Stéphanie Révidat, Pénélope, Bertrand Chuberre, Ulysse, Bernard Deletré, Urilas, Howard Crook, Orphée, Euriloque, Céline Ricci, Eugénie Warnier, Vincent Lièvre-Picard, Thomas van Essen, Le Chœur du Marais, La Simphonie du Marais, conducted by Hugo Reyne. Recorded 9–10 July 2007. [Saint-Sulpice-le-Verdon, Vendée]: Conseil Général de la Vendée, Ⓟ 2007. Musiques à la Chabotterie 605003
