= Katalin Károlyi =

Hungarian singer

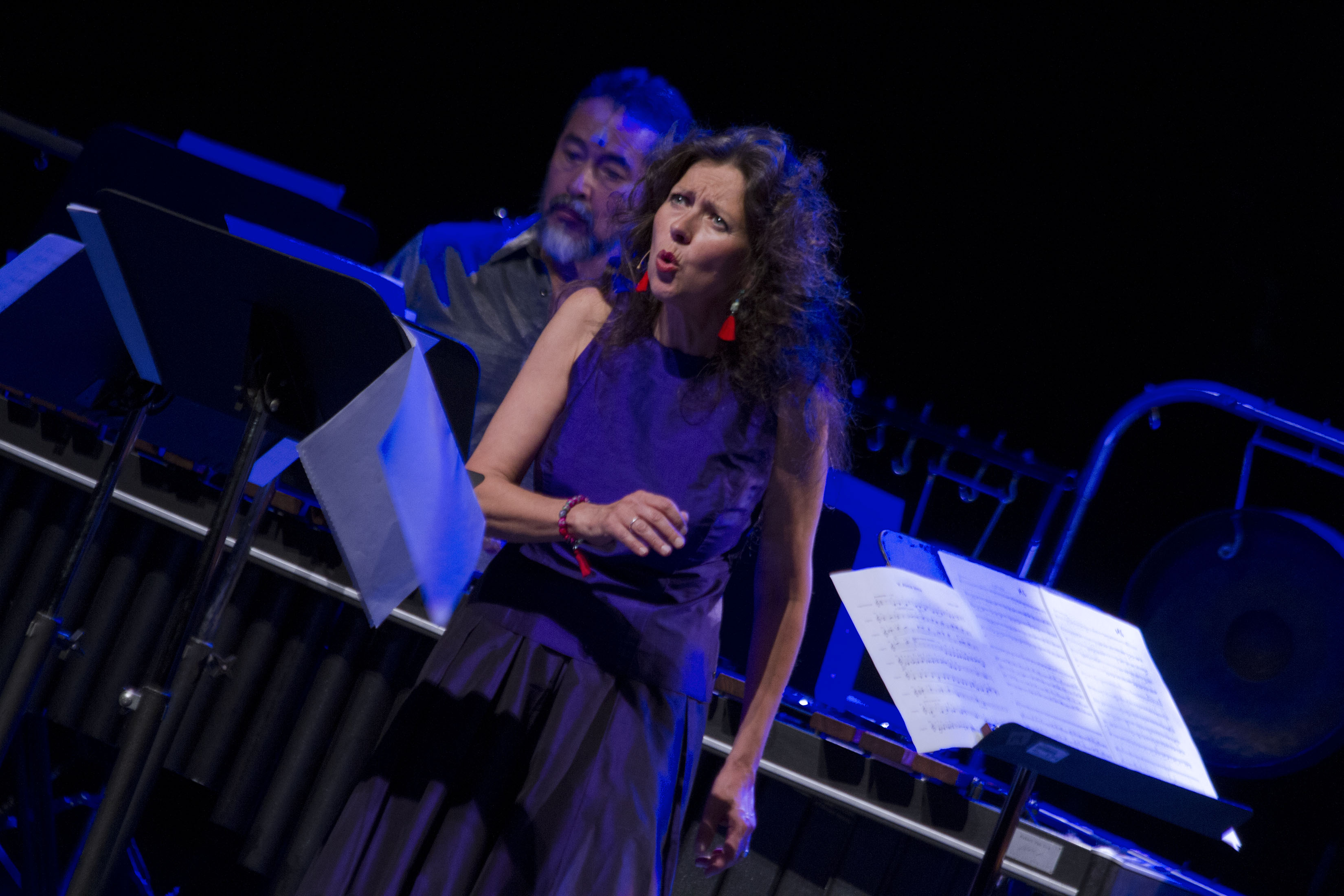
Sunday, May 27, 2018, at the Esperanza Iris City Theater.

Katalin Károlyi is a Hungarian mezzo-soprano, noted for singing in Baroque opera, particularly those directed by William Christie. Károlyi has made a number of recordings with Christie's Les Arts Florissants including Médée and La Descente d'Orphée aux Enfers by Marc-Antoine Charpentier on CD and the DVD recording of Il ritorno d'Ulisse in Patria by Claudio Monteverdi.

== Biography ==
=== Early life ===
Katalin Károlyi began her musical studies with the violin before studying singing.

=== Career ===
She had worked at the Studio Versailles Opéra under the direction of René Jacobs. Then she sang the mass of Igor Stravinsky under the direction of Philippe Herreweghe, works by Debussy and Poulenc with Laurence Equilbey, by Paul Van Nevel and Bernard Tétu or David Robertson.

She had been singing baroque operas The Return of Ulysses to his Homeland at the Opéra-Comique in Paris under the direction of William Christie then at the Aix-en-Provence Festival in July 2002.

In 2000, she was dedicatee with the percussion group Amadinda of the work of György Ligeti Síppal, dobbal, nádihegedűvel, cycle of melodies on poems by Sándor Weöres, for mezzo-soprano and percussion quartet.
