= Atys (Lully) =

Opera by Jean-Baptiste Lully

- Opera by Jean-Baptiste Lully
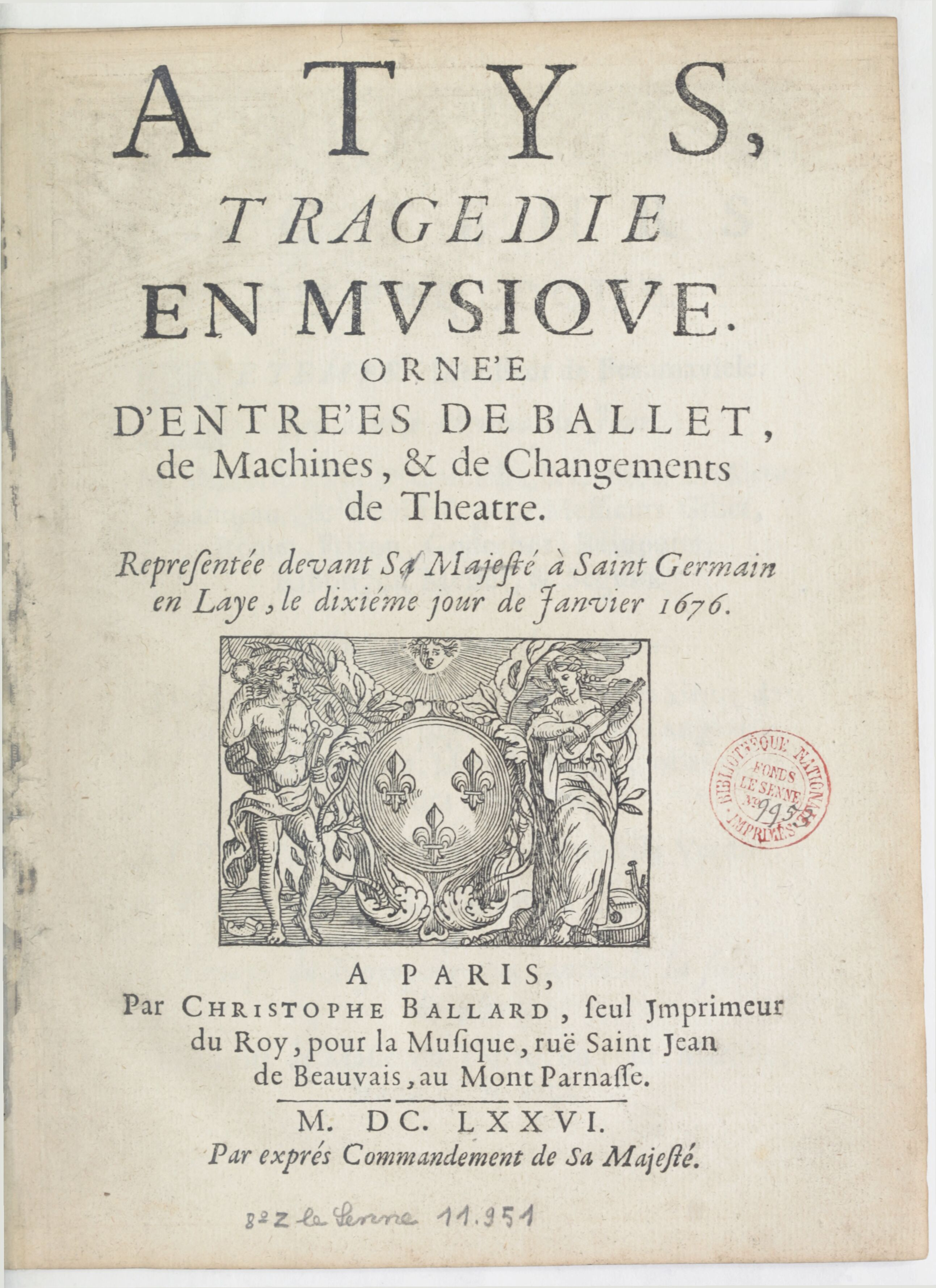
- Title page of the libretto for the premiere
- Librettist: Philippe Quinault
- Language: French
- Based on: Ovid's Fasti
- Premiere: 10 January 1676; Saint-Germain-en-Laye

Atys (Attis) is a tragédie en musique, an early form of French opera, in a prologue and five acts by Jean-Baptiste Lully to a libretto by Philippe Quinault after Ovid's Fasti. It was premiered for the royal court on 10 January 1676 by Lully's Académie Royale de Musique (Paris Opera) at the Château de Saint-Germain-en-Laye. The first public performance took place in April 1676 at the Théâtre du Palais-Royal in Paris.

== Performance history ==
Although Atys was met with indifference by Paris audiences, it became known as "the king's opera" because of Louis XIV's fondness for it; it was given at the Château de Fontainebleau in August 1677 and repeated at Saint-Germain in 1678 and 1682. It was revived at the Palais-Royal in November 1689, August 1690, 31 December 1699, 29 November 1708, 28 November 1709, 23 December 1725, 7 January 1738, and 7 November 1747. It was given concert performances at the Château de Versailles in June 1749 and June 1751 and at Fontainebleau (without the prologue) on 17 November 1753. It was first performed at The Hague in 1687, Marseille in February 1689, Lyon on 7 August 1689, Brussels on 19 November 1700, and Lille in 1720.

The first modern revival was conceived as a touring production staged by Jean-Marie Villégier with the early music group Les Arts Florissants conducted by William Christie and choreography by Francine Lancelot. Initially a coproduction of the Teatro Comunale in Florence and the Montpellier Opera, it was first performed on 20 December 1986 in the small Teatro Metastasio in Prato. The role of Atys was sung by Howard Crook, Cybèle by Guillemette Laurens and Sangaride by Agnès Mellon. Later billed as a Paris Opera presentation, the production premiered at the Salle Favart in Paris on 12 May 1987. It was also performed that same year at the Théâtre de Caen, Montpellier Opera, on tour in Brazil and at the Innsbruck Festival of Early Music. It was revived in 1989 and performed at the Salle Favart and in Montpellier. Performances later that year at the Brooklyn Academy of Music in New York were the opera's American premiere. It was revived again in 1991–1992 and performed in Paris, Madrid's Teatro de la Zarzuela, and the Théâtre de Caen.

Villégier's production was recreated in 2011 with a gift of $3.1 million from the American businessman Ronald P. Stanton and performed at the Salle Favart. An HD video was issued and was the runner-up for the 2012 Gramophone Awards category DVD Performance. The recreated production was also performed at the Théâtre de Caen, Grand Théâtre de Bordeaux, Royal Opera of Versailles and the Brooklyn Academy of Music.

== Roles ==
Prologue
Role	Voice type	Premiere Cast, 10 January 1676 (Conductor: - )
Le Temps, God of Time	baritone	François Beaumavielle
Flore, a goddess	soprano	Marie Verdier
Melpomène, the tragic Muse	soprano	Mlle Beaucreux
Iris, a goddess	soprano	Mlle Des Fronteaux
A Zephyr	haute-contre	Dominique de La Grille
Hercule, Anthæe, Castor, Pollux, Lyncée, Idas, Eteocles, Polynices	dancers	Faüre, Renier, Foignart l'aîné, Foignart cadet, Dolivet, le Chantre, Barazé, Dolivet l'aîné
Tragedy
Atys, relative of Sangaride and favourite of Celænus	haute-contre	Bernard Clédière
Sangaride, nymph, daughter of the River Sangarius	soprano	Marie Aubry
Cybèle, a goddess	soprano	Mlle Saint-Christophle (also spelt Saint-Christophe)
Celænus, King of Phrygia and son of Neptune, in love with Sangaride	baritone	Jean Gaye
Idas, friend of Attis and brother of Doris	bass	Antoine Morel
Doris, nymph, friend of Sangaride, sister of Idas	soprano	Marie-Madeleine Brigogne
Melisse, confidante and priestess of Cybele	soprano	Mlle Bony
Le Sommeil, God of Sleep	haute-contre	Benoît-Hyacinthe Ribon
Morphée, son of Sleep	haute-contre	François Langeais
Phobétor, son of Sleep	baritone	
Phantase, son of Sleep	tenor	
The God of the River Sangar (Sangarius), father of Sangaride	bass	M Goudonesche (also spelt Godonesche)
Alecton, a Fury	silent role (travesti)	M Dauphin
Chorus and Ballet - The Hours of the Day and Night, nymphs who follow Flora, four little zephyrs, heroes who follow Melpomene; Phrygians; followers of Celænus, zephyrs, people attending the celebration of Cybele; Pleasant Dreams, Baleful Dreams; gods of the rivers and brooks, nymphs of the springs; gods of the woods and waters, Corybantes

== Plot and music outline ==
The French style of opera, established in the 1670s by Lully, was in five acts with a prologue.

=== Prologue ===
Lully's prologues normally served to comment on current events at the court of Louis XIV in a way that flattered the king. When the opera was premiered in 1676, France was at war with the Netherlands, and the French winter campaign had resulted in the tragic death of Henri de la Tour. Louis XIV was waiting for the fairer spring weather to arrive so that he could invade Flanders.

The overture is in standard French overture form and style as developed by Lully, featuring three sections: a slow section in duple meter and pompous dotted rhythms in G minor, followed by a faster middle section and concluded with a second slow section ending with a Picardy third.

The scene for the prologue is at the Palace of the allegorical character Time. A chorus of Hours of the Day and Night sing the praises of a 'hero' (Louis XIV) in "Ses Justes loix, ses grands exploits" ("His just laws, his great exploits"). Flore, the goddess of spring and her nymphs arrive and discuss the arrival of spring and perform dances. A Zephyr, on the other hand, laments the coming of spring and the battles that will follow. Just as the hero is about to leave for battle, Melpomene arrives and, in a gesture functioning as a transition to Act I, proceeds to tell the story of Atys in the recitative "Retirez vous." Iris then enters and relays the message from the goddess Cybèle in "Cybèle veut que Flore." This is followed by more dances and the chorus "Préparez vous de nouvelles festes."

=== Act 1 ===
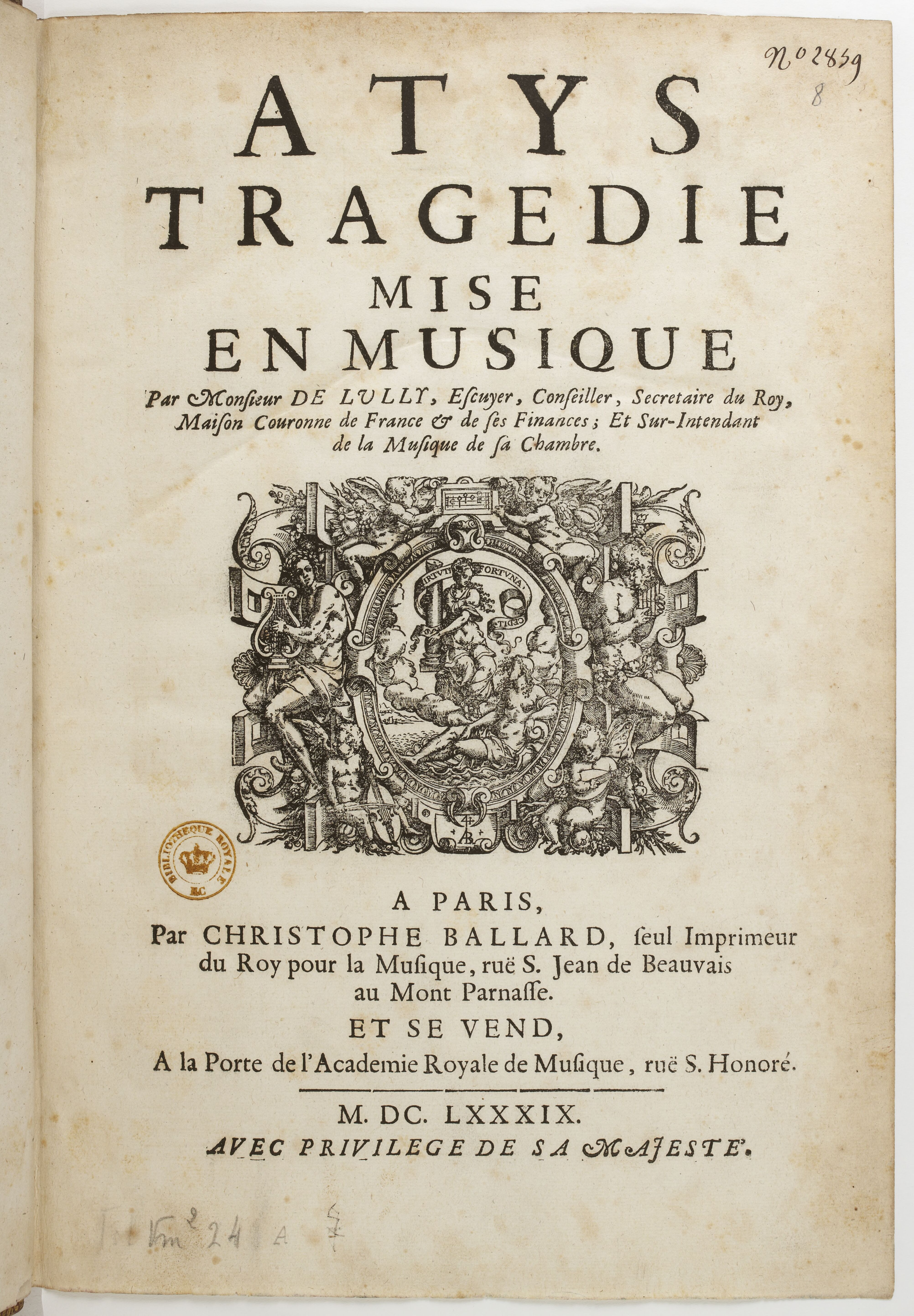
Title page of 1689 score

Scene 1 takes place at the holy mountain of the goddess Cybèle. Atys sings the air "Allons, allons" at a brisk tempo to wake up the Phrygians so that they can give a proper welcome to Cybèle. Idas mocks him in Scene 2, suggesting his motivation might be too much love for the goddess in the air "Vous veillez lorsque tout sommeil." Sangaride and Doris arrive in Scene 3. Sangaride is betrothed to the king of the Phrygians, Celenus, and pretends to be excited for the wedding, especially because the goddess Cybèle will attend. The quartet sings "Allons, allons accourez tous." In scene 4, we learn that Sangaride is in fact unhappy about her forthcoming wedding, for she is really in love with Atys. To convey this, she sings the lament "Atys est trop heureux" based on the diatonically descending tetrachord model (in this case in D minor: D-C-Bb-A) that had been established by Claudio Monteverdi in his Lament of the Nymph. During Scenes 5 and 6, Atys finds Sangaride lamenting and confesses his love for her in the recitative dialogue "Sangaride ce jour est un grand jour pour vous." Sangaride is astonished by his declaration of love. Atys and Sangaride sing the duet "Commençons, commençons" and are soon joined by the chorus of Phrygians in Scene 7. After some dances by the Phrygians, Cybèle appears in Scene 8 and invites all into her temple in "Venez tous dans mon temple." The chorus of Phrygians motivate themselves to comply her wishes with "Nous devons nous animer."

=== Act 2 ===
The scene of Act 2 is inside the temple of the goddess Cybèle.

Celenus and Atys both announce their desire to be selected as the high priest of Cybèle in Scene 1's recitative "N'avancez plus loin." Atys then sings the air "Qu'un indifférent est heureux." In Scene 2, Cybèle arrives and states that she chooses Atys as the high priest because she has secretly loved him. In fact, it was because of her love for Atys that she is attending the wedding. Celenus graciously accepts her decision. The chorus of Nations sings "Célébrons la gloire immortelle" to celebrate Cybèle's choice, followed by a dance by the Zephyrs, which concludes the act in only four scenes.

=== Act 3 ===
The scene changes to the palace of the Sacrificateur of Cybèle where Atys is alone.

This act includes a sommeil (sleep): a type of scene that had been established in Venetian opera. Such scenes were especially useful because they could place a character into a vulnerable position for a variety of potential dramatic purposes. For example, the sleeping character could be vulnerable to attack, brainwashing, or might reveal secret thoughts in the altered state of consciousness. Although many Venetian traditions were not appreciated by the French, Lully and his librettist Quinnault clearly accepted the sleep scene type.

During Scene 1, Atys contemplates his unfortunate dilemma due to his love for Sangaride (who is engaged to King Celenus against her will) in the air "Que servent les faveurs." He is soon joined by Doris and Idas in Scenes 2 and 3, to whom he expresses concerns. In an uncommon outburst in Lullian opera, he exclaims "Mais quoi trahir le Roy!" (But, to betray the king!) Scene 4 is the sommeil described above, in which Cybèle causes him to fall asleep. The allegorical character Le Sommeil sings "Dormons, dormons tous" after a lengthy instrumental introduction featuring gentle music in G minor scored for a pair of flutes, violins, and basso continuo. Once asleep, Atys is first met by a chorus of Pleasant Dreams that sing of love followed by Bad Dreams who remind him that there are consequences for deceiving the gods. After this lengthy scene, Atys awakens in Scene 5 with Cybèle at his side attempting to console him. Sangaride arrives in Scene 6 and begs Cybèle to stop her wedding to King Celenus because she does not love him. Atys, confused, intervenes on Sangaride's behalf. This upsets Cybèle because she too loves Atys and has bestowed the title of high priest on him. When she is left alone with Melissa in Scene 7, she sings the lament "L'ingrat Atys," also based on the chromatically descending tetrachord in A minor (A-G#-G-F#-F-E). Unlike Sangaride's earlier lament in Act I, there is only one presentation of the tetrachord at the beginning rather than a repeated pattern. In Scene 8, Cybèle is left alone and performs the slow air "Espoir si cher si doux."

=== Act 4 ===
This act is set in the palace of the River Sangar with Atys and Sangaride alone.

Scene 1 commences immediately with a dialogue between Sangaride and Atys. She has interpreted Atys's confusion as love for Cybèle and laments in front of Doris and Idas who interject various duets. During Scene 2, King Celenus addresses Sangaride affectionately in "Belle nymphe." He realizes that she does not love him and is only doing so to obey her father. Atys arrives in Scene 3 and hears the conversation. He and Sangaride are left alone in Scene 4 and engaged in a somewhat heated discussion involving rapid alternation between recitative and air styles. Atys assures Sangaride that he loves her and they swear to be faithful to each other. Sangaride's father approaches at the beginning of Scene 5. With his power as the high priest of Cybèle, Atys orders Sangaride's father to cancel the wedding to King Celenus. The River of Sangar approves Sangaride's choice in a chorus "Nous approuvons votre choix," followed by "Que l'on chante." A jubilant dance suite and choral numbers conclude the act.

=== Act 5 ===
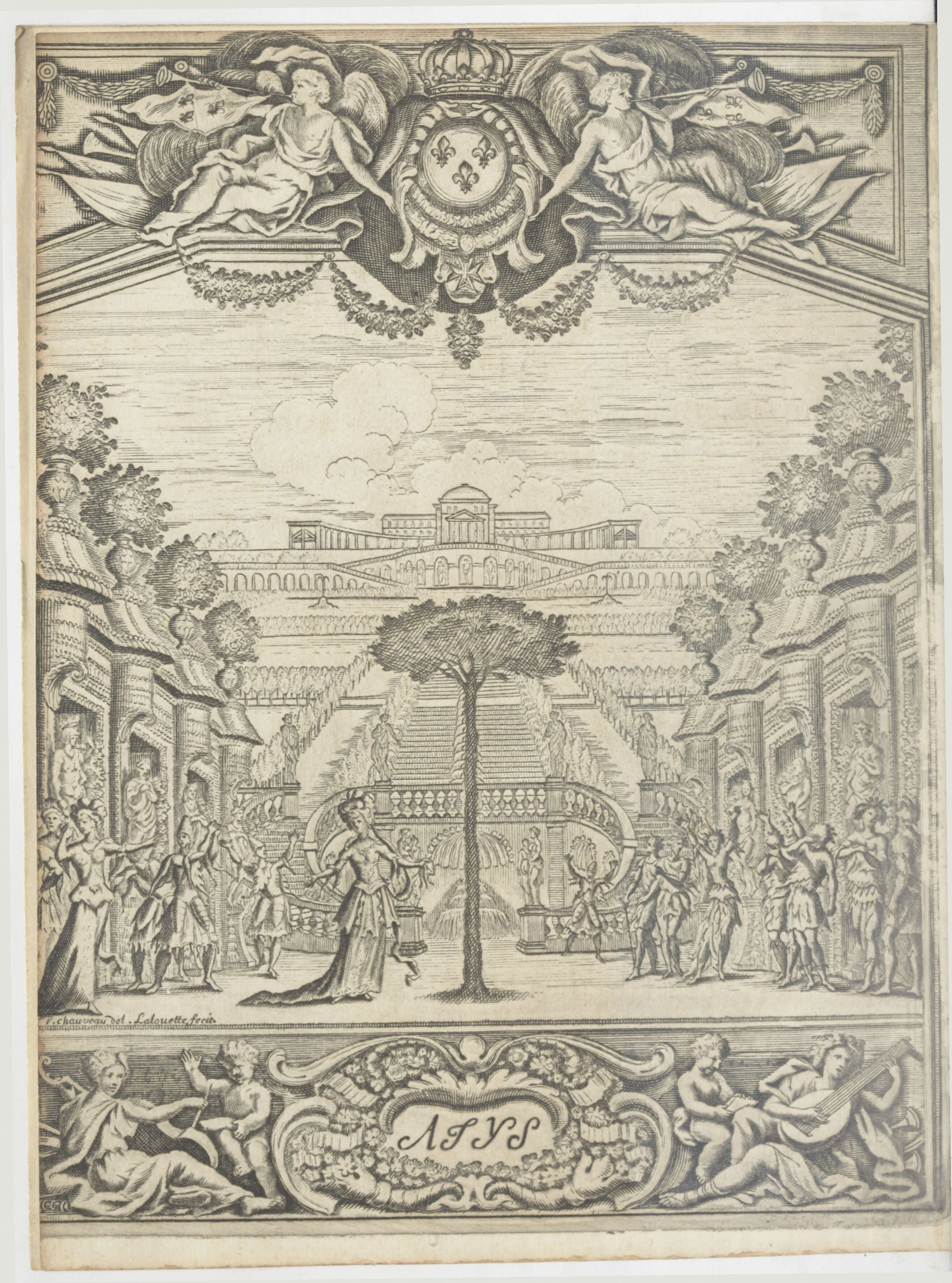
Frontispiece to the 1676 libretto

The final act takes place in the pleasant gardens.

King Celenus finds out that the wedding plans have been cancelled and he confronts Cybèle in a lengthy recitative dialogue in Scene 1. Cybèle is not happy about the situation either. Because Atys has deceived the gods, Cybèle resolves to punish both him and Sangaride. As Atys and Sangaride enter in Scene 2, Cybèle and Celanus begin scolding them with a duet: "Venez vous livrer au supplice" that effectively becomes a dialogue in which the two pairs sing in opposition alternating recitative and air delivery styles. For punishment, Cybèle summons the fury Alecton to put Atys under a magical spell. Scene 3 opens with a furious instrumental prelude, followed by a dialogue ("Ciel! Quelle vapeur m'environne!") between Atys and Sangaride. Atys mistakes Cybèle for Sangaride and Sangaride for a monster and chases Sangaride into the wings. The Phrygian chorus sings "Atys, Atys, lui-même fait perir ce qu'il l'aime. [Atys, Atys himself is slaying the one he loves.]" Celenus enters from the wings and reports the death of Sangaride. In Scene 4, Cybèle removes the spell, informs Atys of his crime and shows him the dead Sangaride. Again the chorus finishes with "Atys, Atys, lui-même." In Scene 5 Cybèle with Mélisse regrets her punishment of Atys. In scene 6 Idas enters carrying Atys, who has stabbed himself. Cybèle intervenes and transforms Atys into a tree, the pine, beloved by the goddess. The final scene is a divertissement of mourning; "the gentle weeping of the nymphs is juxtaposed with the frenzy of the Corybantes."

== Recordings ==
=== Audio ===
- 1987: Guy de Mey, tenor (Atys); Guillemette Laurens, mezzo-soprano (Cybèle); Agnès Mellon, soprano (Sangaride); Jean-François Gardeil, baritone (Célénus); Chœur et Orchestre "Les Arts Florissants", William Christie, conductor. Harmonia Mundi 3 CDs, 2 hr 51 min. Recorded Studio 103 de la Maison de Radio France, January 1987. OCLC 455483098, 180130474, 163459395.
- 2009: Romain Champion, tenor (Atys); Amaya Dominguez, mezzo-soprano (Cybèle); Bénédicte Tauran, soprano (Sangaride); Aimery Lefèvre, baritone (Célénus); Matthieu Heim, bass (Idas); Maud Ryaux, soprano (Doris); Maïlys de Villoutreys, soprano (Mélisse); Vincent Lièvre-Picard, tenor (Morphée); Le Choeur and La Simphonie du Marais; Hugo Reyne, conductor. Musiques à la Chabotterie, 3 CDs, 2 hr 47 min. Recorded 17–18 August 2009, Studio Akustika, Paris. OCLC 708413702.
- 2023: Reinoud Van Mechelen; Ambroisine Bré, mezzo-soprano (Cybèle); Marie Lys, soprano (Sangaride); Philippe Estèphe, baritone (Célénus); Romain Bockler, bass (Idas); Gwendoline Blondeel, soprano (Doris); Apolline Raï-Westphal, soprano (Mélisse); Nick Pritchard, tenor (Morphée); Chœur de chambre de Namur; Les Talens Lyriques, Christophe Rousset, conductor. Château de Versailles Spectacles, catalog no. CVS126, 3 CDs, 2 hr 53 min. Recorded 12-14 July 2023, Opéra Royal du Château de Versailles ASIN B0CN1NQYD7.
- 2024: Mathias Vidal, tenor (Atys); Véronique Gens, soprano (Cybèle); Sandrine Piau, soprano (Sangaride); Tassis Christoyannis, baritone (Célénus); Adrien Fournaison, bass (Idas); Hasna Bennani, soprano (Doris); Éléonore Pancrazi, soprano (Mélisse); Antonin Rondepierre, tenor (Morphée); Reinoud Van Mechelen, tenor (Le Sommeil); Les Pages et les Chantres du Centre de Musique Baroque de Versailles; Les Ambassadeurs - La Grande Écurie, Alexis Kossenko, conductor. Alpha, 3 CDs, 2 hr 57 min. Recorded March 2024, Salle Colonne, Paris.

=== Video ===
- 2011: Bernard Richter (Atys); Stéphanie d'Oustrac (Cybèle); Emmanuelle de Negri (Sangaride); Nicolas Rivenq (Célénus); Marc Mauillon (Idas); Sophie Daneman (Doris); Jaël Azzaretti (Mélisse); Paul Agnew (Dieu de Sommeil); Cyril Auvity (Morphée); Bernard Deletré (Le Temps, le fleuve Sangar); Compagnie Fêtes galantes et Gil Isoart de l'Opéra National de Paris (dancers); Chorus and orchestra of Les Arts Florissants; William Christie, conductor. FRA Musica (2 blu-ray discs): (1) Atys (3 hr 15 min), recreation by the Opéra-Comique of the 1987 production by stage director Jean-Marie Villégier in which the prologue has been greatly modified; recorded live at the Salle Favart in Paris in May 2011; (2) Bonus feature (1 hr 50 min), "Five Visions of Atys", including interviews with Christie and Villégier, among others, OCLC 762095799. Also released on 2 DVDs, OCLC 760307774. Re-released by Naxos (2021, 1 blu-ray disc or 2 DVDs, without supplements).
- 2022: Matthew Newlin (Atys); Adrien Fournaison; Ana Quintans; Sophie Junker; Giuseppina Bridelli (Cybèle); Andreas Wolf; Lore Binon; Valerio Contaldo; Cyril Auvity; Geoffroy Buffière; Chœur de Chambre de Namur; Cappella Mediterranea; Leonardo García Alarcón, conductor. Château de Versailles Spectacles (DVD and Blu-ray Disc): Atys by Jean-Baptiste Lully (2 hr 35 min); recorded live 22 & 23 March 2022; released 23 May 2025; catalogue number CVS113.

== See also ==
- Cibell
- Attis - the Greco-Phrygian god whose myth inspired this opera
