= Les Arts Florissants =

Les Arts Florissants may refer to:

- Les arts florissants (opera), chamber opera by Marc-Antoine Charpentier
- Les Arts Florissants (ensemble), musical group, directed by William Christie, named for the above work, and devoted to playing music of the Baroque
