= Les plaisirs de Versailles =

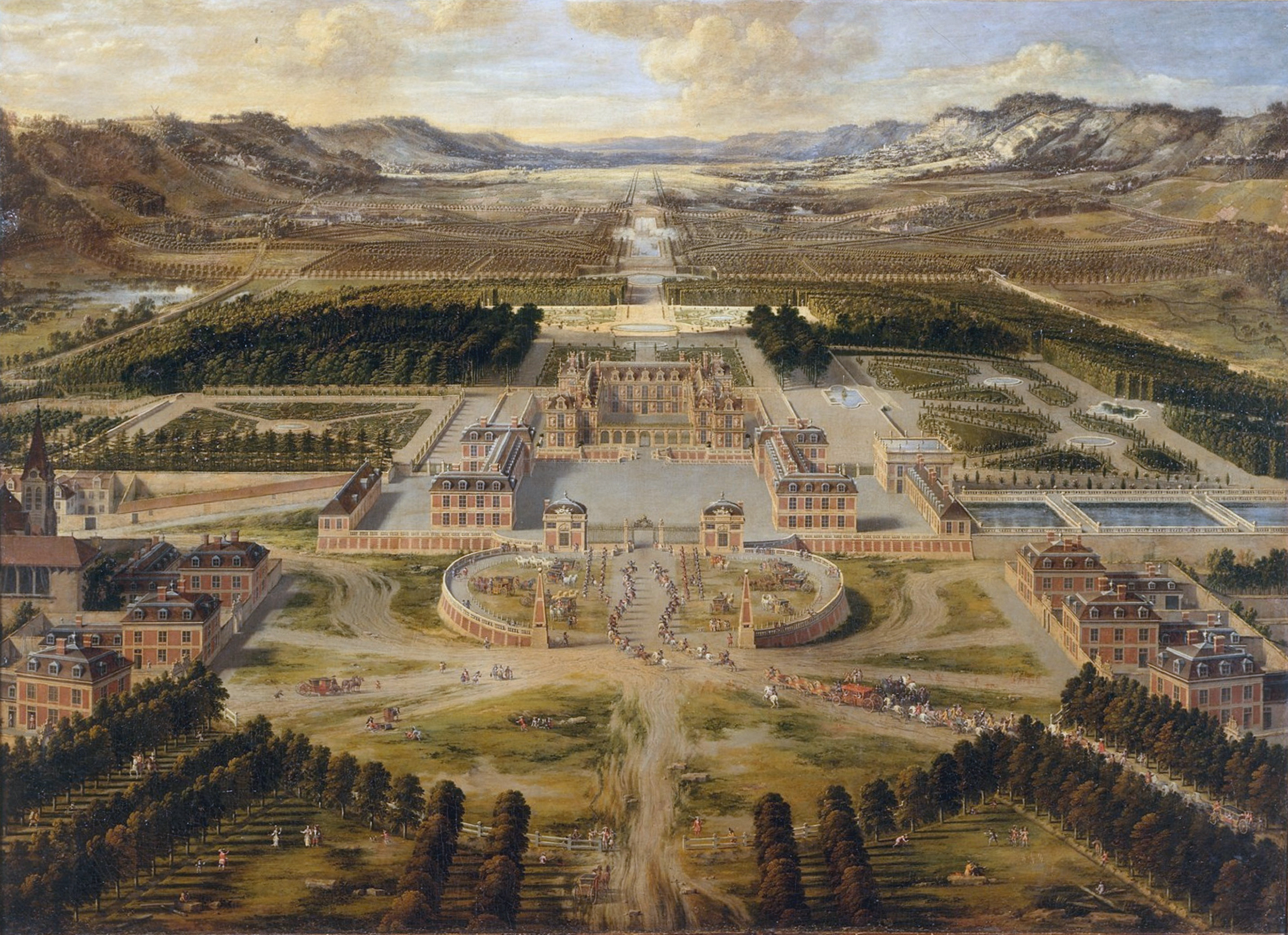
The Palace of Versailles in 1668

Les plaisirs de Versailles H.480 (English: The Pleasures of Versailles) is a short opera (or divertissement) by the French composer Marc-Antoine Charpentier. It was intended for performance at the new courtly entertainment known as les appartements du roi ("the king's receptions") devised by King Louis XIV and held in his own apartments at the palace of Versailles in 1682. At the time, Charpentier was composer for Louis, le Grand Dauphin, the king's son. The librettist is unknown.

== Roles and synopsis ==
Most of the characters represent the pleasures enjoyed at Versailles: La Musique (Music), La Conversation (Conversation), Le Jeu (Gambling), Comus and Un plaisir (A Pleasure). The cast of the first performance is unknown but Charpentier himself may have sung Le Jeu. La Musique sings until she is interrupted by the babble of la Conversation. Comus arrives and tries to reconcile the two by offering chocolate, wines and confectionery. Le Jeu suggests they gamble, but la Musique only wants to sing and la Conversation only wants to drink chocolate. The two finally agree to settle their differences so they can both help King Louis to relax after fighting his wars.

== Selected recordings ==
- Les Plaisirs de Versailles H.480 (with Les Stances du Cid H.457- H.459 and Amor vince ogni cosa H.492) Sophie Daneman, Katalin Karolyi, Steve Dugardin, Jean-François Gardeil, François Piolino, Patricia Petibon, Monique Zanetti, Fernand Bernadi, Les Arts Florissants conducted by William Christie, CD (Erato, 1996). Diapason d'or
- Les Plaisirs de Versailles H.480, Idylle sur le retour de la santé du Roi H.489, Sonate à 8 H.548, Les Folies Françoises, Patrick Cohen-Akenine. Director, Olivier Simonet, DVD Armide Classics / Vox Lucida ARM 003, 2004.
- Les Plaisirs de Versailles H.480 (with Les Arts Florissants H.487), Teresa Wakim, Jesse Blumberg, Virginia Warnken, Boston early Music Festival Vocal & Chamber Ensembles, Paul O’Dette, Stephen Stubbs, CD (CPO, 2019).

== Sources ==
- The Viking Opera Guide ed. Holden (Viking, 1993)
- Le magazine de l'opéra baroque
- Libretto
