= Nicolas Rivenq =

French opera singer

Nicolas Rivenq (born 1958) is a contemporary French baritone.

Born in London, Rivenq studied music at the "École d'Art lyrique" of the Paris Opéra, as well as the Indiana University.

He has participated in numerous productions of baroque music under the direction of William Christie, and with his ensemble, Les Arts florissants.

He won the Viotti International Music Competition held at Vercelli (Italy) in 1990 by singing extracts from Le nozze di Figaro.

== Selected discography ==
- André Campra's Grands Motets (Virgin Classics, 2002)
- Mozart's Idomeneo, re di Creta, KV 366 (Harmonia Mundi, 2008)
- Lully's Atys, at FRA Musica / Harmonia Mundi (Blu-ray)
- Mozart's Così fan tutte (Don Alfonso), BBC / Opus Arte (Blu-ray)
- Bizet, Carmen, Decca (1989)
