= François Francoeur =

French composer and violinist

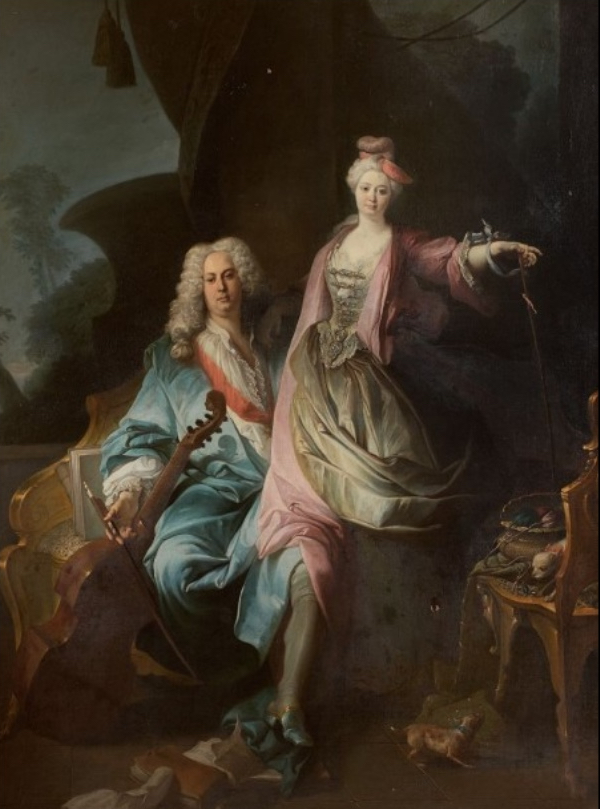
Presumed portrait of François Francœur, by Auger Lucas

François Francœur (21 September 1698 – 5 August 1787) was a French composer and violinist from the late Baroque era and the Classical era.

== Biography ==
François Francœur was born in Paris, the son of Joseph Francœur, a basse de violon player and member of the 24 violons du roy. Francœur was instructed in music by his father and joined the Académie Royale de Musique as a violinist at age 15. After travel and performances in the principal European culture centres, he returned to Paris as a member of the Concert Spirituel. Francœur was appointed to the 24 violons du roy in 1730 and Maître de musique (music instructor) to the Opera in 1739.

In 1744, he and François Rebel, his lifelong colleague and friend, were appointed inspecteurs musicaux (music directors) of the Paris Opéra—centre of the French music world—becoming responsible for all phases of its management in 1757. Rebel and Francœur faced numerous challenges in their joint roles, including a large financial deficit, lack of discipline, as well as handling contentious disagreements between traditionalists who favored French operatic tragedies and its mythological themes versus partisans of Italian opera's simpler lyricism and contemporary subject matter, known as the Querelle des Bouffons.

King Louis XV appointed Francœur as his Music Master in 1760, ennobling Rebel in the same year and Francœur himself in May 1764. Disaster struck when the Paris Opéra was consumed in flames on 6 April 1763, and the two directors were forced to resign in 1767 in its aftermath. However, Louis XV asked Rebel to return to the Opéra as Administrateur général in 1772, a position he held until shortly before his death three years later. Francœur resigned himself from the music world, living in retirement until his own death in 1787 at age 89. He was thus spared the fate of his nephew, Louis-Joseph Francœur, Master of the King's Chamber music and orchestra director, who was imprisoned during the French Revolution until the fall of Maximilien Robespierre in 1794.

== Compositions ==
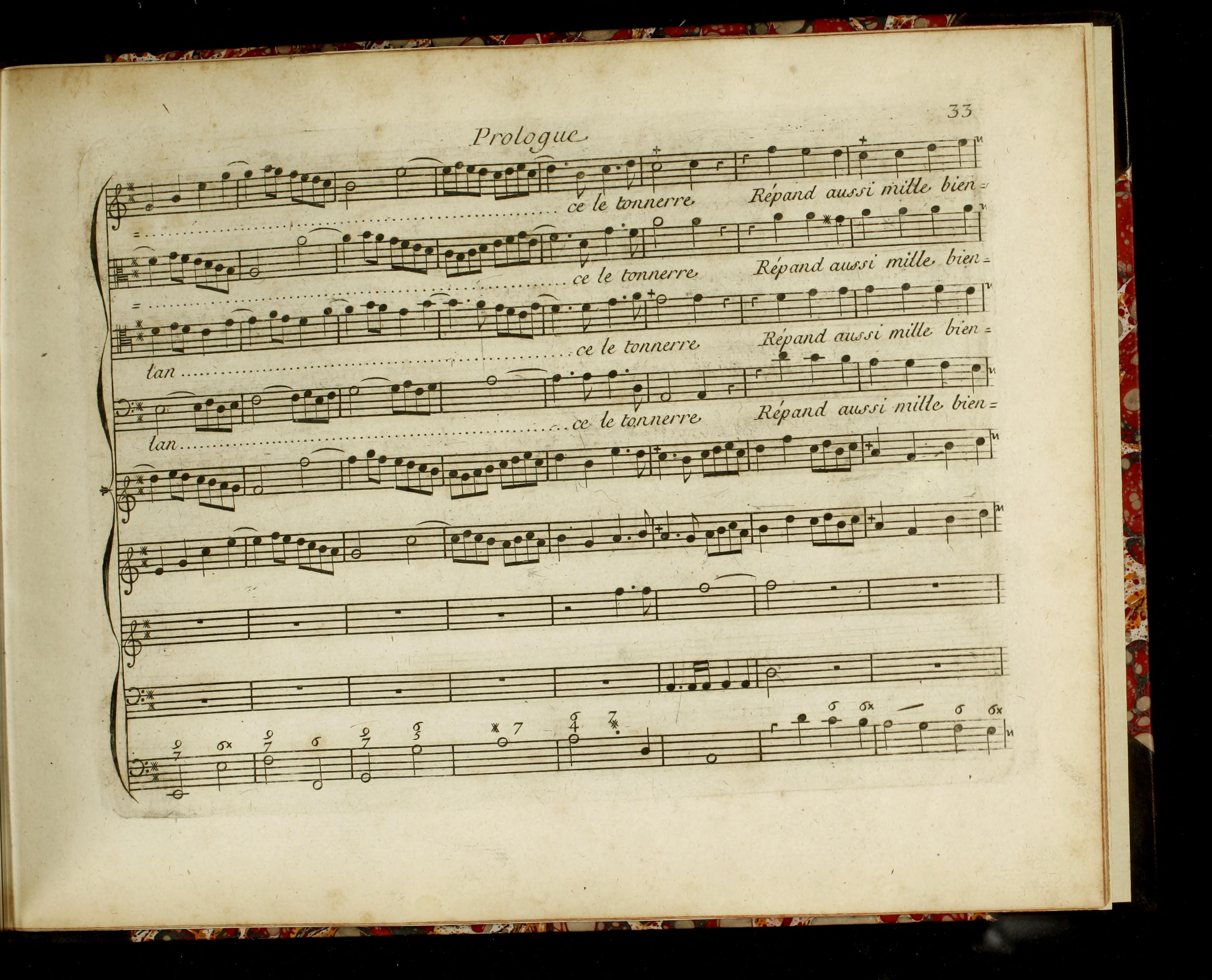
Sheet music for the prologue of Le Trophée

His surviving compositions, published in Propyläen der Musik, V. 2 (1989), include two books of violin sonatas, 10 operas (including one about the life of Skanderbeg) and some ballets, created jointly with François Rebel. Thus he is often quoted as a relatively rare case of collaboration in musical composition.

=== Forgeries and misattribution ===
A cello sonata in E from 1726 in is often incorrectly attributed to Francœur starting from Jean-Delphin Alard's 1863 error. The sonata was actually written originally for violin by François's brother, Louis Francœur instead. Additionally, Arnold Trowell published the sonata as a forgery in 1924 in which he removed Louis's second movement and replaced it with a Allegro Vivo movement of Trowell's own creation. Griffiths (2012) finds his forged movement more Italian than French in style even though it is 'skillfully' written and finds similarities between it and Daniel van Goens's Scherzo (Op. 12) as well as Trowell's own Scherzo (Op. 12 No. 2). Although not an outright replacement, Trowell also significantly altered the final Gigue movement as well while keeping Louis Francœur's original harmony. The first, third, and fourth movements were not changed in the Trowell publication.

Fritz Kreisler, an Austrian contemporary of Trowell, also forged his Sicilienne and Rigaudon composition under François Francœur's name.

== Recordings ==
Recordings of Francœur's works include a noteworthy LP, Music for the Wedding of the Count d'Artois, on the Musical Heritage label, and the Cypres CD 1626 Suites de Simphonies, including what may be the same set of works by Francœur. Hugo Reyne and La Simphonie du Marais also recorded the Symphonies pour le Festin Royal du Comte d'Artois. The opera Pirame et Thisbé, a collaborative work with Rebel, was released in 2008, and Zélindor, Roi des Sylphes and Le Trophée were released in 2009.

There is a 2003 recording of Francœur's Sonata in E for Cello and Piano on Delos by Zuill Bailey which is of the Trowell forgery (see above section).

== Musicological and stylistic notes ==
Special emphasis is placed on the above recordings for musicological as well as aesthetic reasons. In the transition from ages relatively little interested in earlier music (19th and early 20th century) to an age where a professional specialization in "ancient music" has arisen, composers like Francœur, who had relatively modest instrumental production or did not in other ways attract special professional attention, have often remained in obscurity. It is easy to see from Francœur's inventiveness and infectious rhythmic drive why he was esteemed in his lifetime. Had Louis XVI had him as a music instructor earlier in his life, instead of, as biographers suggest, a musical mediocrity who chilled his interest in the violin, he might have become a royal composer like Frederick the Great of Prussia.

Francœur is sometimes categorised amongst the "Classical-era" composers who avoided the "classical style of Haydn and Mozart". The surviving music of Francœur (supposedly composed close to 1773), though contemporary with that of Haydn and Mozart, shows relatively few of the courtly mannerisms that abound in classical music directly sponsored by royalty. Rather, it has more of an "advanced Rococo" character, spicing strings with creative use of wind instruments. This kind of music seems to have been especially favoured by the rising bourgeoisie and lesser aristocracy in mercantile centres like London, Hamburg, and Frankfurt, as well as Paris, who provided an increasing market for musical composition.

== Works ==
=== Operas (with François Rebel) ===
- Pirame et Thisbé, tragédie en musique (1726)
- Tarsis et Zélie, tragédie en musique (1728)
- Scanderberg, tragédie en musique (1735), 33 performances
- Le ballet de la paix, ballet héroïque (1738)
- Les Augustales, divertissement (1744)
- Zélindor, roi des sylphes, divertissement (1745)
- Le trophée, divertissement (1745)
- La félicité, ballet héroïque (1746)
- Ismène, pastorale héroïque (1747)
- Le prince de Noisy, ballet héroïque in 3 acts, libretto by Charles-Antoine Leclerc de La Bruère, f.p. Versailles, Théâtre des petits appartements, (1749)
- Les génies tutélaires, divertissement (1751)

=== Instrumental music ===
- Premier Livre de sonates à violon seul et basse continue (1720)
- Deuxième Livre de sonates à violon seul et basse continue (1730)
- Symphonies pour le festin royal du comte d'Artois (1773)
- La symphonie du Marais

=== Other works ===
- Le retour du roi, 'dialogue chanté' (1745)
