= Cibell =

A cibell or cebell is a gavotte-like musical piece in duple metre, predominantly heard in Baroque music. It is named after the chorus praising the goddess Cybele in Jean Baptiste Lully's Atys. Later cibells have been written either for voice or a variety of instruments, such as the trumpet or harpsichord. A typical example is Henry Purcell's Cibell for trumpet, strings and basso continuo in C major (Z 678).
