= Les arts florissants (opera) =

Opera by Marc-Antoine Charpentier

- Chamber opera by Marc-Antoine Charpentier
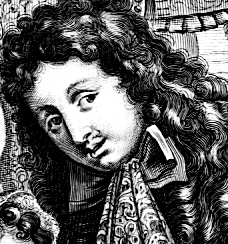
- Marc-Antoine Charpentier in 1682
- Language: French
- Premiere: 1685; Residence of Marie de Lorraine, Duchess of Guise, Paris

Les arts florissants (H.487) is a short chamber opera (also described by the composer as idylle en musique) in five scenes by Marc-Antoine Charpentier.

== History ==
It was written in 1685 for the group of musicians employed by Marie de Lorraine, Duchess of Guise, at her residence in Paris. The reason behind the creation of this work, as well as its place of performance, remain a matter for speculation. The French libretto, written by an unknown author, is allegorical in nature and draws on aspects of mythological and natural symbolism familiar to 17th-century audiences to add depth to a superficially simple plot.

The story of the opera concerns the eponymous Arts, shown flourishing under the beneficent and peaceful reign of Louis XIV, as they and a group of warriors become drawn into a dispute between the central characters of La paix (Peace) and La discorde (Discord). After a brief struggle in which Discord and his Furies gain the upper hand, Peace appeals to Jupiter to intervene on her behalf. Discord and his followers are chased back into Hades by a hail of thunderbolts, and Peace holds sway once more.

== Analysis ==
The opera is scored for seven solo voices, five-part chorus, two flutes (or recorders), two treble viols and basso continuo.

The manuscript score also calls for two choruses in the form of a Troupe de Guerriers (Troop of Warriors) and a Chœur de Furies chantantes (Chorus of singing Furies), to be sung by all available singers, and a troupe of Furies dansantes, si l'on veut (Dancing Furies, if desired). The instrumentalists are included in the original character list under the entry Suite de la Musique, and the overture is labelled pour les symphonistes de la Suite de la Musique (for the orchestral players in Music's following).

== Roles ==
Role	Voice type	Premiere cast, 1685 (Conductor: – )
La Musique, Music	soprano	Jacqueline-Geneviève de Brion
La Poésie, Poetry	soprano	Antoinette Talon
La Peinture, Painting	haute-contre	Marc-Antoine Charpentier
L'Architecture, Architecture	mezzo-soprano	Marie Guilbault de Grandmaison
La Discorde, Discord	bass	Pierre Beaupuis
La Paix, Peace	soprano	Elisabeth "Isabelle" Thorin
Un Guerrier, A Warrior	baritone	Germain Carlier

== Selected recordings ==
- Charpentier: Les Arts Florissants H.487 / William Christie, Les Arts Florissants. CD Harmonia Mundi 1982 report Musique D'abord 1987.
- Charpentier: les Arts Florissants H.487, La Couronne de Fleurs H.486, (excerpts) / Gaétan Jarry, Ensemble Marguerite Louise. CD Château de Versailles spectacles 2017/2018.
- Charpentier : Les Arts Florissants H.487, Les Plaisirs de Versailles H.480, Teresa Wakim, Jesse Blumberg, Virginia Warnken, Boston early Music Festival Vocal & Chamber Ensembles / Paul O’Dette, Stephen Stubbs. CD CPO 2019.
- Charpentier : Les Arts Florissants H.487, Haley Sicking, Patrick Gnage, Dallas Bach Society, New York Baroque Dance Company, conducted by James Richman. CD Rubicon 2024

== Bibliography ==
- Marc-Antoine Charpentier: "Les Arts florissans", Marc-Antoine Charpentier: Œuvres complètes, ser.I vol.7 (facs.), ed. H. Wiley Hitchcock (Paris: Minkoff France, 1996) 120-164
- Marc-Antoine Charpentier, H. Wiley Hitchcock, Oxford University press 2001. Also in Grove Music online.
- Shirley Thompson, New perspectives on Marc-Antoine Charpentier, New York, routledge, 2010/2016, 600 p.

== Sources ==
- H. Wiley Hitchcock: "Marc-Antoine Charpentier 1. Life", Grove Music Online ed. L. Macy (Accessed August 25, 2006), www.grovemusic.com (subscription access)
- John S. Powell: "Les Arts florissants", Grove Music Online ed. L. Macy (Accessed August 25, 2006), www.grovemusic.com (subscription access)
