= Arnold Trowell =

New Zealand composer and cellist

Arnold Wilberforce Trowell (25 June 1887 – 16 December 1966), also known as Thomas Wilberforce Trowell, was a New Zealand composer, cellist and teacher who became professor of music at the Guildhall School of Music in London.

== Biography ==
Arnold Trowell was born in Wellington, New Zealand in 1887. He was the son of Thomas Trowell and twin of Garnet Carrington Trowell. In 1903 both brothers went to Europe to study; Arnold the cello and Garnet the violin.

Trowell studied at the Hoch Conservatorium in Frankfurt and in Brussels, winning the Concours prize for the cello. He settled in London in 1907.

Before leaving for Europe Trowell had become friends, and romantically involved, with Katherine Mansfield and they continued to correspond when Mansfield was living in London and Trowell was studying in Brussels. Mansfield later fell in love with Garnet.

Trowell became a member of The Chamber Music Players, a group formed by Lionel Tertis, in 1922 until 1923.

He became professor of cello at the Guildhall School of Music in 1924 and joined the staff of the Royal School of Music from 1937.

Trowell was both performer and composer. He wrote seven concertos, three sonatas, four symphonic poems and numerous pieces for cello and piano and songs.

Like Fritz Kreisler, Trowell forged in 1924 a version of Louis Francœur's cello/violin sonata in E (which is also often misattributed to Francœur's brother, François Francœur). Trowell replaced Francœur's second movement with his own Allegro Vivo movement and modified the final Gigue movement. There are several recordings of the forgery with this misattribution.

== Selected works ==
- Six morceaux pour violoncelle avec accomp. de piano (1908) - dedicated to Kathleen M. Beauchamp
- Concerto for violoncelle avec accompagnement d'orchestre (ou piano) (c1909)
- Quartet for two violins, viola and violoncello, G major (c1917)
- Viola Sonata, E-flat major (c1920) - dedicated to Lionel Tertis
- Technology of violoncello playing - Books 1–3 (1922–1925)
- Suite for orchestra : the golden age : childhood (c1930)
