= Paul Agnew =

Scottish operatic tenor and conductor

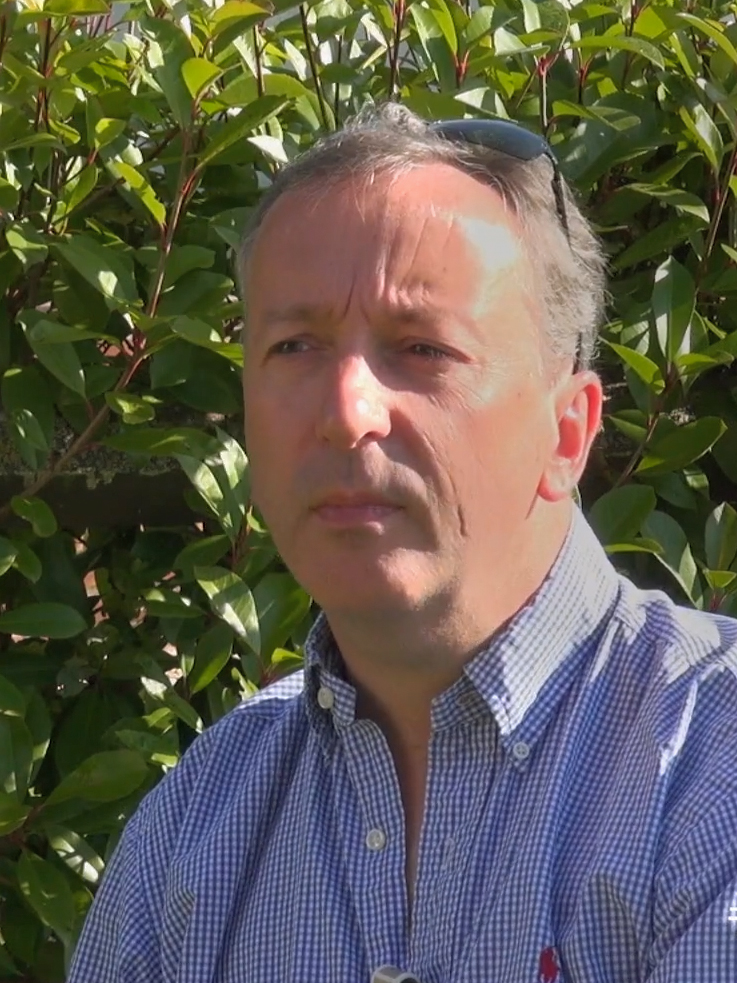
Paul Agnew (2015)

Paul Agnew (born 11 April 1964 in Glasgow) is a Scottish operatic tenor and conductor.

== Biography ==
Agnew read music as a Choral Scholar at Magdalen College, Oxford. He became associated with various groups specializing in early music (Ex Cathedra, the Consort of Musicke, the Tallis Scholars, the Sixteen and the Gothic Voices) before embarking on a solo career in the early 1990s.

He is well known for singing high tenor roles in French repertoire, although he has had success in other types of music.

Paul Agnew's recordings include Mozart's Coronation Mass, Bach cantatas and Bach's Mass in B minor with Ton Koopman and the Amsterdam Baroque Orchestra & Choir, Bach's St John Passion with Stephen Cleobury (also on video), Bach's St Markus Passion with Roy Goodman, Berlioz's L'enfance du Christ with Philippe Herreweghe, Handel's Solomon with Paul McCreesh, Bach's Christmas Oratorio with Philip Pickett and Rameau's Dardanus with Pinchgut Opera. He has played the title travesti role in Rameau's Platée, which has been released on DVD.

=== Les Arts Florissants ===
Paul Agnew is closely associated with William Christie and Les Arts Florissants. For example, Agnew has performed the roles of Jason in Charpentier's Médée H.490 and of Hippolyte in Rameau's Hippolyte et Aricie, as well as appearing on the recordings of "Grand Office des morts" H.2, H.12, H.311, Te Deum H.146, The Judgement of Salomon H.422, Motet for a long offertory H.434, La descente d'Orphée aux enfers H.488 and Les plaisirs de Versailles H.480, by Marc-Antoine Charpentier; Acis and Galatea by George Frideric Handel, and Rameau's Grands Motets (Gramophone's Best Early Music Vocal award in 1995). Agnew conducted Les Arts Florissants in Purcell's opera The Indian Queen.

He was appointed associate musical director of Les Arts Florissants in 2013 as well as co-director of Le Jardin des Voix, the academy for young singers, established by Les Arts Florissants. In 2020 he became co-musical director of Les Arts Florissants.

== Conducting ==
In 2007 Agnew conducted Les Arts Florissants in a performance of Antonio Vivaldi. He was the first person other than William Christie to conduct the ensemble. Since then he has combined his conducting and singing careers.
