= Howard Crook =

American lyric tenor (1947–2024)

Howard Crook (June 15, 1947 – August 27, 2024) was an American lyric tenor who lived and worked in the Netherlands and France beginning in the early 1980s.

== Life and career ==
Crook was born in Rutherford, New Jersey, and educated at Baldwin-Wallace College in Berea, Ohio, and then University of Illinois, where he received a master's degree in music, specialising in opera. He worked in theatre and mime for a few years before becoming a professional singer after winning second prizes in the vocal competitions of Paris and 's-Hertogenbosch.

Crook began to specialize in early music and performed and recorded with the leading conductors in that field; he performed in Leclair's Scylla et Glaucus, Berlioz's Les nuits d'été and Bach's St Matthew Passion with John Eliot Gardiner; with Trevor Pinnock, Handel's Messiah and with Roger Norrington, Henry Purcell's The Fairy-Queen.

Crook sang the solos in the large-scale works of Bach and the major tenor roles in most of the operas of Lully, Rameau, Haydn and Mozart. The high-tenor roles of the French Baroque were his speciality: he performed Charpentier's Funeral Music for Maria Theresa (H.409 & H.331) and 9 Leçons de Ténèbres; with Louis Devos; Lully's Atys with William Christie; Lully's Armide with Philippe Herreweghe; Lully's Alceste, Rameau's Castor et Pollux and Rameau's Pigmalion, amongst others, with conductors such as Marc Minkowski.

Crook taught baroque singing at the CNR conservatory in Paris, and regularly gave masterclasses.

Crook died on August 27, 2024, at the age of 77.
