= Sophie Daneman =

British soprano (born 1968)

Sophie Daneman (born 1968) is a British soprano specializing in the baroque repertoire.

== Biography ==
Sophie Daneman, a daughter of the actor Paul Daneman, studied at the Guildhall School of Music and Drama in London.

She became known during the 1990s with the baroque music ensemble Les Arts Florissants, spearhead of the baroqueux movement led by William Christie, with whom she interpreted mainly great names of the French baroque such as Montéclair, Rameau, Charpentier, Mondonville and Couperin.

In addition to William Christie, Daneman worked under the direction of numerous choir directors, such as Christopher Hogwood, Robert King, Gérard Lesne, Jean-Claude Malgoire, Neville Marriner, Philippe Herreweghe, and Nicholas McGegan.

== Selected discography ==
Daneman has recorded for the labels Erato, Harmonia Mundi, EMI Classics and Virgin Records.

=== With Les Arts Florissants ===
- 1992: Jephté by Michel Pignolet de Montéclair
- 1993: Castor et Pollux by Jean-Philippe Rameau (a sequel to Hébé/Un Plaisir)
- 1994: Grands Motets by Jean-Philippe Rameau
- 1995: Médée by Marc-Antoine Charpentier
- 1995: La descente d'Orphée aux enfers by Marc-Antoine Charpentier
- 1996: Les plaisirs de Versailles by Marc-Antoine Charpentier
- 1997: Grands Motets by Jean-Joseph Cassanéa de Mondonville
- 1997: Les Fêtes d'Hébé by Jean-Philippe Rameau
- 1997: Leçons de ténèbres by François Couperin
- 1999: Acis and Galatea by Handel
- 2001: La guirlande by Jean-Philippe Rameau (Zélide)
- 2003: Theodora by Handel (Theodora)
- 2011: John Blow: Venus and Adonis, directed Elizabeth Kenny (Wigmore Hall Live) (Venus)

=== With the Collegium Musicum 90 ===
- 1997: Ottone in Villa d'Antonio Vivaldi (Tullia)

=== With the Philharmonia Baroque Orchestra ===
- 1999: Arianna in Creta de Haendel (Arianne)

=== Other ===
- 1997: Songs & Duets, Vol. 1 by Félix Mendelssohn with Nathan Berg (baritone) and Eugene Asti (piano)
- 1999: Songs & Duets, Vol. 2 by Félix Mendelssohn with Stephan Loges (baritone) and Eugene Asti (piano)
- 2001: Lieder by Schumann with Julius Drake (piano)
- 2001: Irish, Welsh & Scottish songs by Beethoven, with Peter Harvey, Paul Agnew, Alessandro Moccia, Alix Verzier and Jérôme Hantaï
