= Péniche Opéra =

French opera company

La Péniche Opéra is a small French opera company which performs on a barge. When performing in Paris, the barge is moored opposite of No.46, quai de Loire, in the 19th district of Paris.

It was founded by director Mireille Larroche, Ivan Matiakh, Béatrice Cramoix and Pierre Danais in 1982, and became recognised, and subsidised as a Compagnie Lyrique Nationale in 1998. The "barge opera" was in residence at the Paris Opéra Comique from 1998 to 2007 but has travelled by canal to be associated artist of the Opéra de Toulon from 2003 to 2007.

Since 9 March 2016, it's being managed by Geoffroy Jourdain and Olivier Michel, who changed the institution's brand to POP.
