= Hugo Reyne =

French musician and conductor

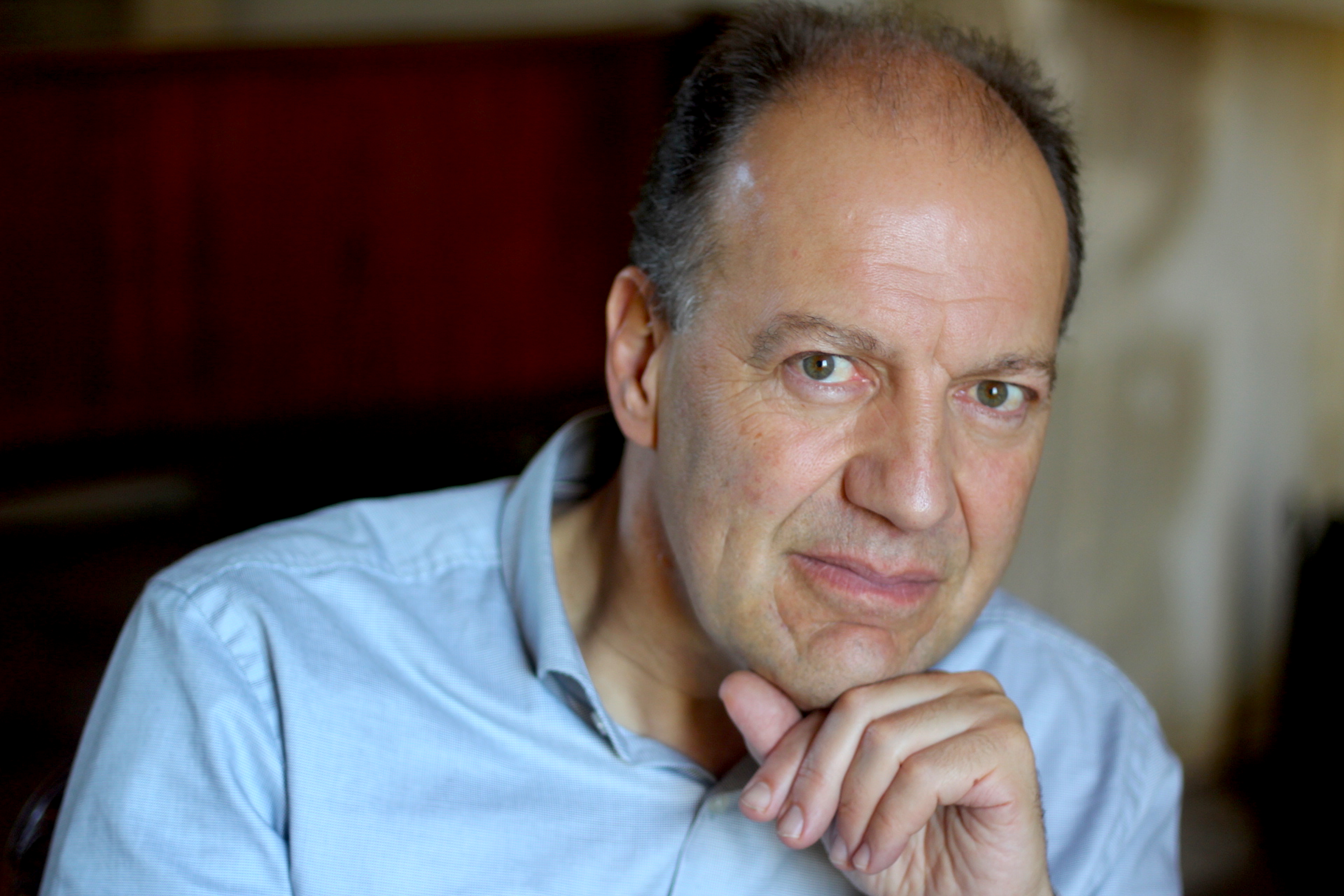
Portrait of Hugo Reyne

Hugo Reyne (born in 1961) is a contemporary French recorder player, oboist and conductor. He is the founder and music director of La Simphonie du Marais.

== Biography ==
Born in Paris, Hugo Reyne began learning the flute and oboe at a very young age. In 1984, he won the first prize for chamber music at the Bruges International Chamber Music Competition. In the 1980s, Hugo Reyne played flute and oboe in most of the Parisian baroque ensembles, and from 1983 to 1996 he played the 1st flute at the Arts Florissants under the direction of William Christie. He has worked with conductors such as Frans Brüggen, Philippe Herreweghe, Gustav Leonhardt and Jordi Savall.

In 1987 he founded his historical interpretation ensemble, La Simphonie du Marais and was particularly interested in French lyrical music. Since 2003 Hugo Reyne has been artistic director of the Musiques at the Logis de la Chabotterie festival in Saint-Sulpice-le-Verdon.

Hugo Reyne devotes a large part of his time to musicological research, as well as to the publishing of old scores, he is also a collector of flutes and possesses a hundred instruments. For his work on the French musical heritage, he was awarded the title of Chevalier de l'Ordre des Arts et des Lettres in 1998.

== Discography (Musiques à la Chabotterie) ==
- 2006: La Naissance d'Osiris by Jean-Philippe Rameau
- 2007: Ulysse by Jean-Féry Rebel
- 2008: Musiques au temps de Richelieu
- 2008: Haendel: 6 Concertos for flute
- 2009: Concerts mis en simphonie Jean Philippe Rameau, orchestrated version of harpsichord pieces
- 2009: Viennoiseries musicales
- 2010: Atys by Jean-Baptiste Lully
- 2012: Charpentier: Music for Molière's comedies
- 2012: Nais, opera for peace by Jean Philippe Rameau
- 2013: Vivaldi: 6 concertos for flute
- 2014: Rameau: Les Indes galantes
- 2016: Bach: Brandenburg Concertos
