= Médée (Charpentier) =

Opera by Marc-Antoine Charpentier

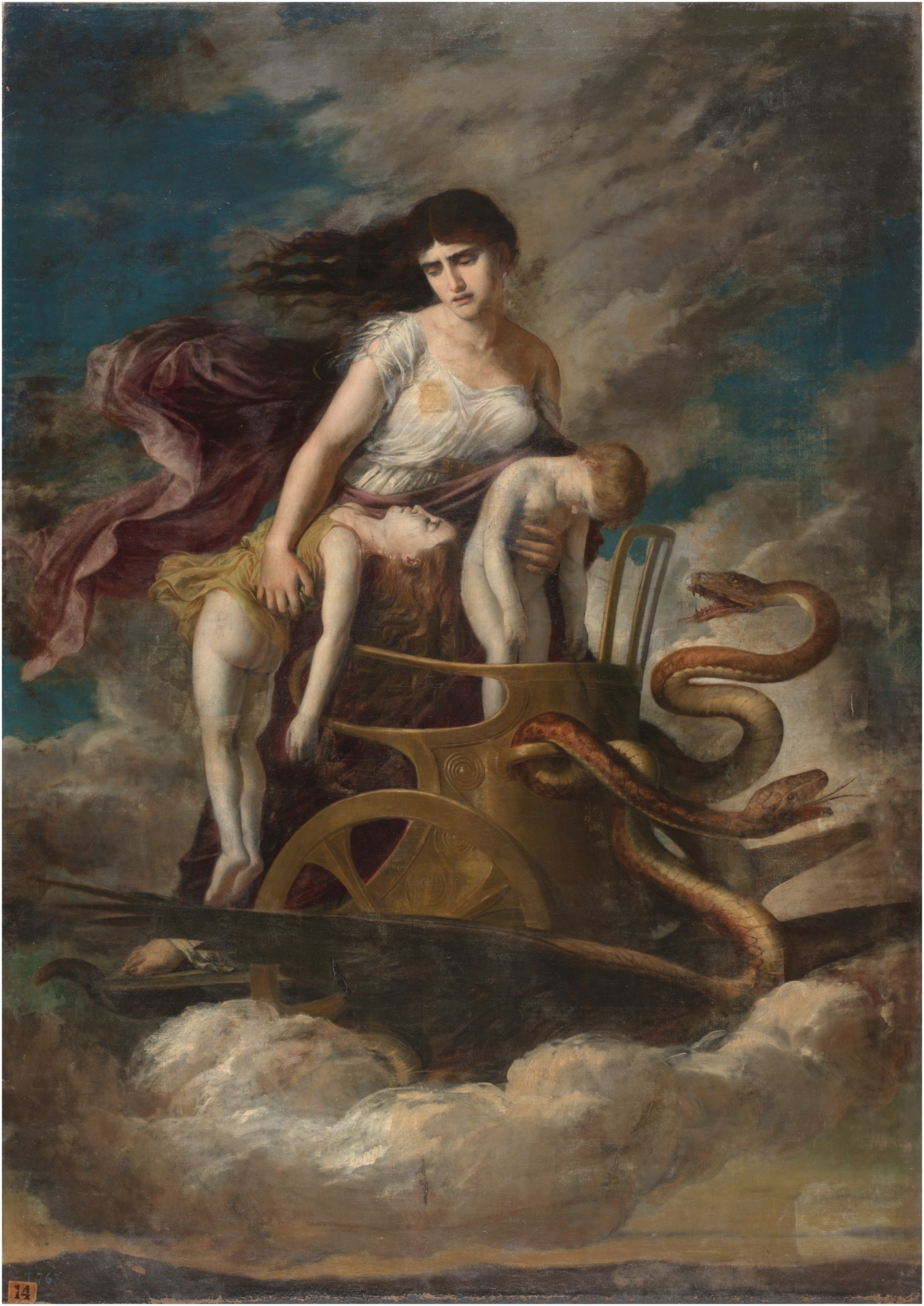
Medea by Germán Hernández Amores

Médée H.491 is a tragédie mise en musique in five acts and a prologue by Marc-Antoine Charpentier to a French libretto by Thomas Corneille. It was premiered at the Théâtre du Palais-Royal in Paris on December 4, 1693. Médée is the only opera Charpentier wrote for the Académie Royale de Musique. The opera was well reviewed by contemporary critics and commentators, including Sébastien de Brossard and Évrard Titon du Tillet, as well as Louis XIV whose brother attended several performances, as did his son; however, the opera only ran until March 15, 1694, although it was later revived at Lille.

== Roles ==
Role	Voice type	Premiere Cast, December 4, 1693 (Conductor: - )
Médée, Princess of Colchis	soprano	Marie Le Rochois
Nérine, Medea's confidante	soprano	
Jason, Prince of Thessaly	haute-contre	Louis Gaulard Dumesny
Arcas, Jason's confidant	tenor	
Créon, King of Corinth	bass	Jean Dun
Oronte, Prince of Argos	baritone	
Créuse, Daughter of Créon	soprano	Fanchon Moreau
Cléone, Créuse's confidante	soprano	
A chorus of Corinthians, Argians, Love’s captives, demons, and phantoms

== Synopsis ==
=== Prologue ===
A celebration of the glory of King Louis XIV.

=== Act 1 ===
Jason and Médée (Medea), pursued by the people of Thessaly because of Médée's crimes, have sought refuge in Corinth. Médée is worried that Jason is growing distant from her. Jason claims he needs to win the good graces of the princess Créuse so her doting father, King Créon, will protect them. He suggests that Médée should give Créuse a beautiful robe as a present. After Médée leaves, Jason confides to Arcus that he is really in love with Créuse but fears Médée's reaction. Créuse is due to be married to Oronte, prince of Argos, who now arrives in Corinth with his army. However, King Créon tells Jason that he would prefer him as a son-in-law. Jason leads the combined Corinthian and Argive army to victory against the Thessalians.

=== Act 2 ===
Créon tells Médée he will not hand her over to her enemies but she must leave Corinth. Jason and his children by her will stay. Médée protests that she only committed those crimes out of love for Jason, but Créon replies that the Corinthian people want her to leave. Médée hands over her children to Créuse. Créuse confesses her love to Jason.

=== Act 3 ===
Oronte promises Médée refuge in Argos if she can arrange a marriage between him and Créuse. She tells him that the only reason she is being banished is so Jason can be free to marry Créuse. They must combine forces to prevent this happening. Jason pleads with Médée that he is only acting in the best interests of their children. Left alone, Médée resorts to witchcraft and summons demons from the underworld who bring her a poisoned robe for Créuse.

=== Act 4 ===
Jason admires the beauty of Créuse's new robe. Oronte finally realises that what Médée had said is true: Créuse will marry Jason, not him. Médée vows that Créuse will never be Jason's bride. Créon arrives and is angered that Médée has not yet left Corinth. He orders his guards to seize her but she conjures up spirits of beautiful women who seduce the guards away. Then she uses her magic powers to drive the king insane.

=== Act 5 ===
Médée rejoices at her success and plans to take her vengeance to an extreme by murdering her own children by Jason. Créuse begs her to spare Corinth, even pledging to renounce her wedding to Jason if she does so. News arrives of Créon's madness and death. Médée touches Créuse's poisoned robe with her wand and it bursts into flame. Créuse dies in Jason's arms. Jason swears revenge on Médée, who now appears in a flying chariot pulled by dragons to announce she has stabbed their children. She leaves as the palace of Corinth bursts into flames.

== Selected recordings ==
- "Charpentier - Médée" with Irma Kolassi, Médée, Nadine Sautereau, Créuse, Paul Derenne, Jason, Doda Conrad, Créon, Flora Wend, Cléone, Ensemble vocal et instrumental, Nadia Boulanger (conductor), recorded in 1953, report CD IDIS 6493 2006 & DG 2021 (extracts)
- "Charpentier - Médée" with Les Arts Florissants William Christie (conductor), Jill Feldman, Médée, Gilles Ragon, Jason, Jacques Bona, Créon, Sophie Boulin, Nérine, Agnès Mellon, Créuse, Philippe Cantor, Oronte. 3 CD Harmonia Mundi (901139.41), recorded in 1984 report 2019
  - Grand Prix du Disque Académie Charles Cros 1985, La Référence Compact magazine, Sélection Télérama ffff, Diapason d'or, Le Timbre d'Argent de la revue Opéra, Diamant de Harmonie panorama musique, Gramophone award 1985, International Record Critics Award Montreux 1985, Prix Opus 1985 USA. Choc de Classica 2019.
- "Charpentier - Médée" with Les Arts Florissants William Christie (conductor), Lorraine Hunt Lieberson, Médée, Mark Padmore, Jason, Bernard Deletré, Créon, Monique Zanetti, Créuse, Jean-Marc Salzmann, Oronte, Noémie Rime, Nérine, Sophie Daneman. 3 CD Erato Records, recorded in 1994
  - 10 de Répertoire, Choc du Monde de la Musique, Diapason d'or, Diamant Opéra magazine.
- "Charpentier - Médée" (DVD) with Le Concert Spirituel - Hervé Niquet (conductor), Stéphanie d'Oustrac, Médée, François-Nicolas Geslot, Jason, Renaud Delaigue, Créon Gaëlle Mechaly, Créuse, Bertrand Chuberre, Oronte, Caroline Mutel, Nérine, Hanna Bayodi, Cléone, Anders J. Dahlin, stage Director, Olivier Simonet. Vox Lucida - Armide, filmed in 2004
- “Charpentier - Médée” with Le Concert spirituel - Hervé Niquet (conductor), Vèronique Gens, Mèdèe, Cyrille Dubois, Jason, Thomas Doliè, Crèon, Judith Wanroij, Crèuse, David Witczak, Oronte. 3 CD Alpha, recorded in 2023. Diapason d’or

== Bibliography ==
- Original libretto: Medée, Tragedie en Musique, Representée par l'Academie Royale de Musique, Paris, Ballard, 1693 (accessible for free online at Gallica - B.N.F.)
- Period printed score: Medée, Tragedie mise en Musique par Monsieur Charpentier, Paris, Ballard, 1704 (accessible for free online at Gallica - B.N.F.)
- John S. Powell. "Médée (i)", Grove Music Online, ed. L. Macy (accessed May 20, 2006), grovemusic.com (subscription access).
- Médée (Paperback) music by Marc-Antoine Charpentier, libretto by Thomas Corneille, edited by Edmond Lemaître, CNRS Editions (September 1, 1998) ISBN 2-222-03937-1
