= H. Wiley Hitchcock =

American musicologist (1923-2007)

Hugh Wiley Hitchcock (September 28, 1923 in Detroit, Michigan – December 5, 2007 in New York, New York) was an American musicologist. He is best known for founding the Institute for Studies in American Music at Brooklyn College of the City University of New York in 1971. The institute was recently renamed the Hitchcock Institute for Studies in American Music in his honor.

Hitchcock received a B.A. degree from Dartmouth College in 1944 and an M.A. from the University of Michigan in 1948. After studying under Nadia Boulanger in Paris, he earned his Ph.D. at the University of Michigan in 1954. He taught there from 1950 to 1961 and then at Hunter College from 1961 to 1971. He taught in the CUNY system until 1993, when he retired. He served as president of the Music Library Association, 1966–1967, the Charles Ives Society, 1973–1993, and the American Musicological Society, 1990–1992.

Hitchcock did much work on music of the early Baroque in France and Italy, especially on Marc-Antoine Charpentier. He also made important contributions to the understanding of musical traditions in America, both popular and cultivated, and his text in this field is a standard reference work. In addition to Charles Ives, he focused particular attention on contemporary American composers including Virgil Thomson, John Cage, and Henry Cowell. He was the co-editor of the New Grove Dictionary of American Music and a consultant for American music for The New Grove Dictionary of Music and Musicians.

== Books ==
- The Latin Oratorios of Marc-Antoine Charpentier (dissertation, U. of Michigan, 1954)
- Music in the United States: a Historical Introduction (1969; 4th ed., 1999)
- (ed., with V. Perlis) An Charles Ives Celebration (Brooklyn, NY, and New Haven, CT, 1974)
- After 100 [!] Years: the Editorial Side of Sonneck (Washington DC, 1975)
- Charles Ives (London, 1977, 3rd ed. 1988)
- (with L. Inserra) The Music of Henry Ainsworth's Psalter (Brooklyn, NY, 1981)
- Les oeuvres de Marc-Antoine Charpentier: catalogue raisonné (Paris, Picard 1982)
- Marc-Antoine Charpentier (Oxford, 1990)
- Charles Ives: 129 Songs (New York City, 2004)
