= La Simphonie du Marais =

French music ensemble

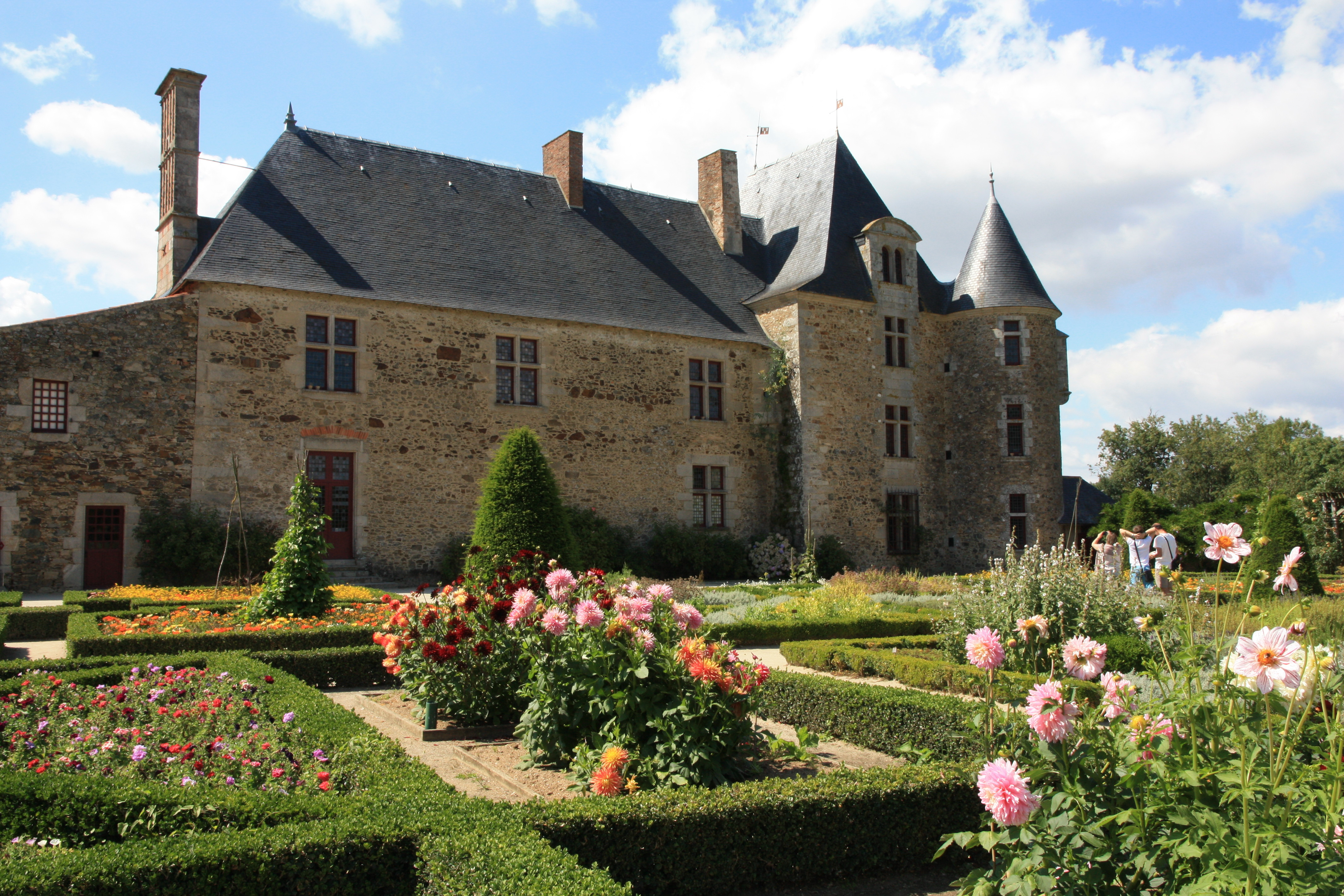
La Chabotterie, seat of la Simphonie du Marais

La Simphonie du Marais is a French music ensemble established in 1987 by recorder player Hugo Reyne. Today, it is located in the Logis de la Chabotterie of Saint-Sulpice-le-Verdon in Vendée. It performs exclusively vocal and instrumental Baroque music (Rameau, Lully, Delalande…).
