= Les Arts Florissants (ensemble) =

French musical ensemble

Les Arts Florissants performing Henry Purcell's Dido and Aeneas in 2020

Les Arts Florissants is a French Baroque musical ensemble housed in the Philharmonie de Paris. The organization was founded by conductor William Christie in 1979. The ensemble derives its name from the 1685 opera Les Arts florissants by Marc-Antoine Charpentier. The organization consists of a chamber orchestra of period instruments and a small vocal ensemble. Christie remains the organization's artistic director, alongside British tenor Paul Agnew who became co-musical director in 2020.

== Work ==
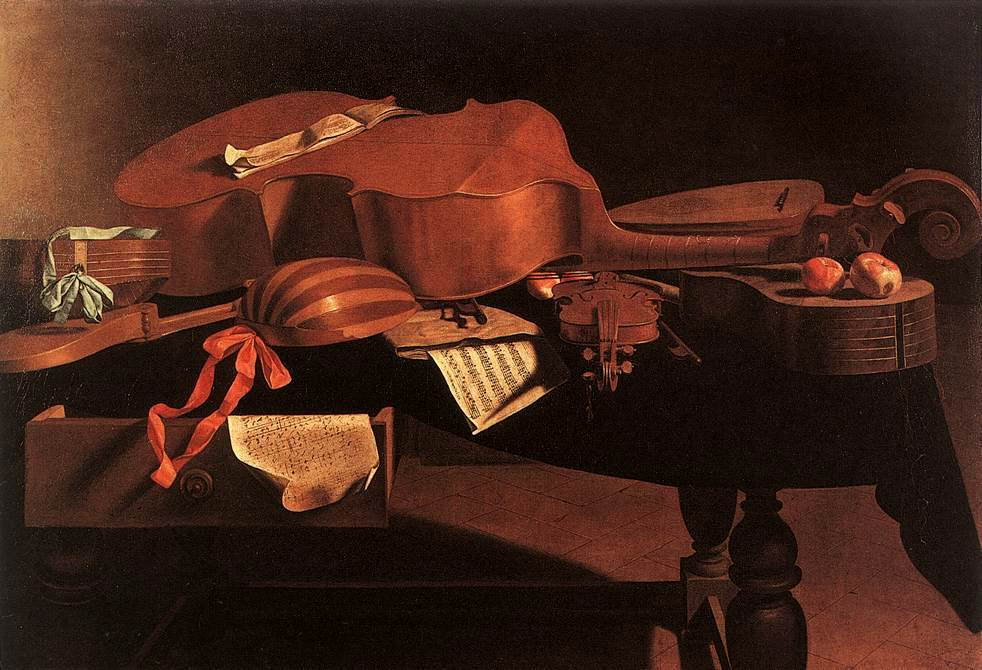
Baroque period instruments: lute, hurdy-gurdy, viola da gamba, Baroque violin, and Baroque guitar

Although not specifically a Baroque opera ensemble, it is within this field that Les Arts Florissants has achieved its greatest successes. The majority of the ensemble's performances are of period operas (both staged and in concert), many of which are available on CD on the Harmonia Mundi and Erato labels and on DVD. The group first drew international acclaim in the area of opera in December 1986-January 1987 with a production of Jean-Baptiste Lully's Atys at the Opéra-Comique in Paris. The opera had not been performed since 1753 and Christie had unearthed the score at the Bibliothèque nationale de France and created a performing edition. William Christie: "There were a number of important moments in the history of the Arts Florissants, but there's one moment that obviously stands out – and that's the moment when we produced Atys." Christie had been approached by the director of the Paris Opera, Massimo Bogianckino, to think about putting on a Lully opera. Christie was advised by the Opéra-Comique's Thierry Fouquet that Quinault's libretto for Atys would demand an extraordinary stage director – Jean-Marie Villégier took this role and he, together with Christie, created Atys. The production marked the renaissance of Baroque opera in France.

The ensemble has continued in a similar vein, by presenting Marc-Antoine Charpentier's opéra Médée in 1993 and many rarely heard works at their home in Caen and on the stages of major opera houses and concert venues like the Teatro Real, the Opéra national du Rhin, the Opéra National de Paris, Carnegie Hall, the Brooklyn Academy of Music, and the Barbican Centre. The ensemble also occasionally presents works from the standard repertoire, most particularly a number of operas by Wolfgang Amadeus Mozart.

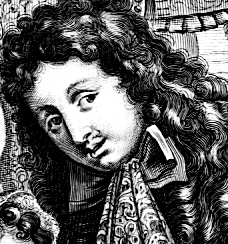
Marc-Antoine Charpentier

Les Arts Florissants has also had a number of successes in the concert repertoire. The organization has performed and recorded a number of oratorios, cantatas, madrigals, masses, motets, and other musical forms typical of early music. Occasionally, the ensemble has made forays into contemporary repertoire, notably performing the world premiere of Betsy Jolas's Motets III – Hunc igitur terrorem at a gala on the occasion of the ensemble's 20th anniversary in 1999.

Many former members of Les Arts Florissants have gone on to have successful music careers outside of the organization. These include several internationally renowned conductors in the field of early music such as Marc Minkowski (founder of Les Musiciens du Louvre), Christophe Rousset (founder of Les Talens Lyriques), Hugo Reyne (founder of La Simphonie du Marais), and Hervé Niquet (founder of Le Concert Spirituel).

== Partial list of productions ==
- 1982: Les arts florissants (Charpentier)
- 1983: Dido and Aeneas (Purcell)
- 1983: Il ballo delle ingrate (Monteverdi)
- 1985: Actéon (Charpentier)
- 1985: Anacréon (Rameau)
- 1985: La Passion selon Saint-Jean (Bach)
- 1986: Actéon (Charpentier)
- 1986: Anacréon (Rameau)
- 1986: Atys (Lully)
- 1987: Atys (Lully)
- 1989: Atys (Lully)
- 1989: The Fairy Queen (Purcell)
- 1990: Les Indes galantes (Rameau)
- 1990: Le Malade imaginaire (Charpentier)
- 1990: Les Indes galantes (Rameau)
- 1991: Castor et Pollux (Rameau)
- 1992: Atys (Lully)
- 1993: Médée (Charpentier)
- 1993: Orlando (Handel)
- 1993: Les Indes galantes (Rameau)
- 1994: Médée (Charpentier)
- 1994: Die Zauberflöte (Mozart)
- 1994: Médée (Charpentier)
- 1995: Die Entführung aus dem Serail (Mozart)
- 1995: Die Zauberflöte (Mozart)
- 1995: King Arthur (Purcell)
- 1996: Acis and Galatea (Handel)
- 1996: Alcina (Handel)
- 1996: Hippolyte et Aricie (Rameau)
- 1996: Die Entführung aus dem Serail (Mozart)
- 1996: Semele (Handel)
- 1997: Hippolyte et Aricie (Rameau)
- 1997: Le Nozze di Figaro (Mozart)
- 1998: Les Pèlerins de la Mecque (Gluck)
- 1999: Les Indes galantes (Rameau)
- 1999: Alcina (Handel)
- 2000: Il ritorno d'Ulisse in patria (Monteverdi)
- 2000: Les Indes galantes (Rameau)
- 2001: Il Tito (Cesti)
- 2002: Il ritorno d'Ulisse in patria (Monteverdi)
- 2002: L'incoronazione di Poppea (Monteverdi)
- 2003: Les Boréades (Rameau)
- 2003: Les Indes galantes (Rameau)
- 2003: Serse (Handel)
- 2004: Les Paladins (Rameau)
- 2004: Hercules (Handel)
- 2006: Hercules (Handel)
- 2006: Die Zauberflöte (Mozart)
- 2006: Die Entführung aus dem Serail (Mozart)
- 2008: Armide (Lully)
- 2010: The Fairy Queen (Purcell)
- 2012 David et Jonathas (Charpentier) Festival d'Aix en Provence
- 2015: Un Jardin à l'Italienne

== Discography ==
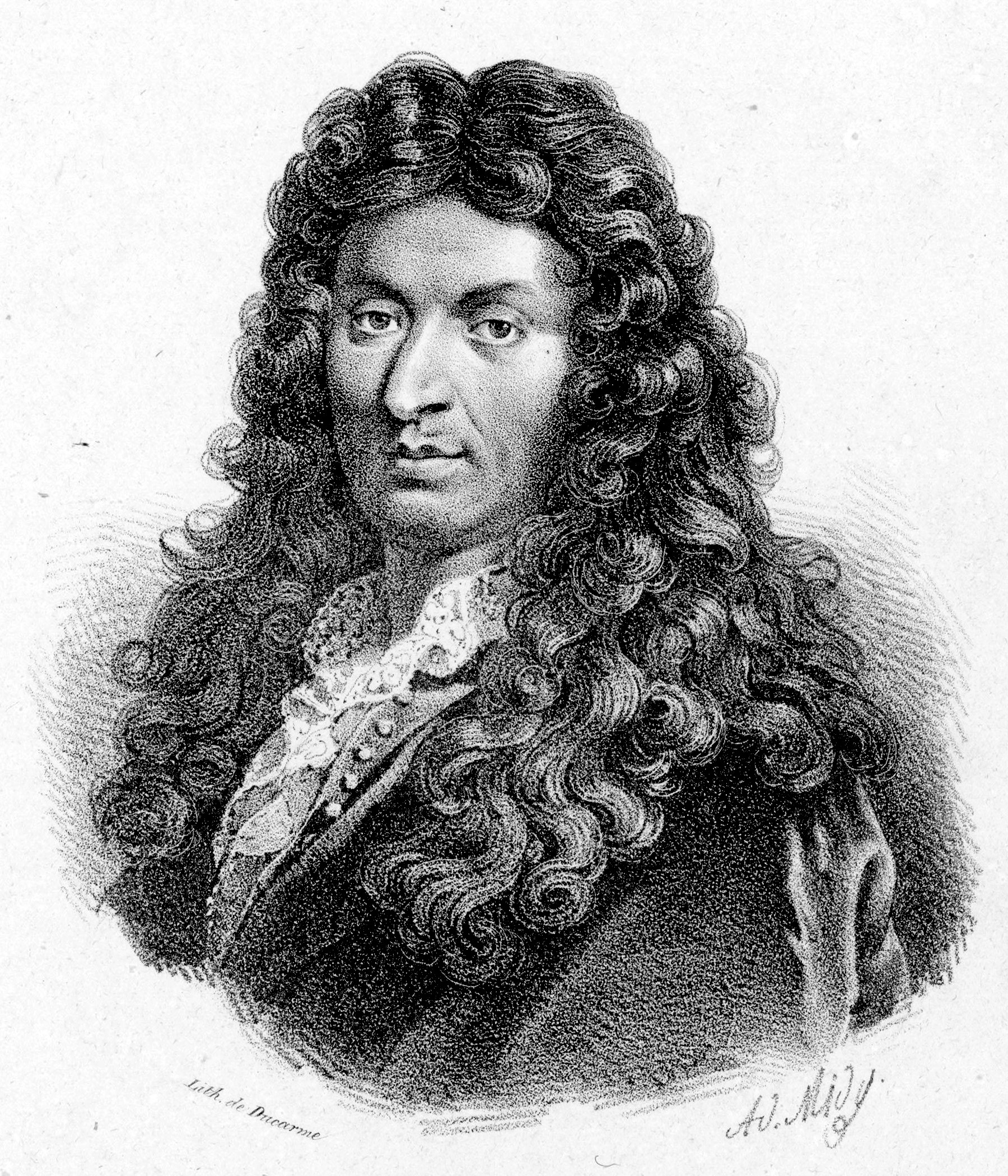
Jean-Baptiste Lully (1632–1687). The 1986 production of his opera Atys by Les Arts Florissants brought the ensemble to international attention. The opera was subsequently recorded by the group for Harmonia Mundi in 1993.

- Caecelia, virgo et martyr H.413, Filius prodigus H.399, Magnificat à 3 voix H.73, Marc-Antoine Charpentier, Harmonia Mundi, 1979
- Cantique de Moÿse; Veni sponsa mea; Trois fantaisies à quatre pour les violes; Espoir de toute âme affligée; O bone Jesu, Étienne Moulinié, Harmonia Mundi, 1980
- Madrigaux des VIIe et VIIIe livres, Claudio Monteverdi, Harmonia Mundi, 1981
- Pastorale sur la naissance de N.S. Jesus-Christ, H.483 ; In nativitatem Domini Nostri Jesu Christi canticum H.414; Magnificat à 3 voix, H.73, Marc-Antoine Charpentier, Harmonia Mundi 1982
- Actéon H.481, Intermèdes pour Le mariage forcé H.494 ii, Marc-Antoine Charpentier, Harmonia Mundi 1982
- Les Antiennes "O" de l'Avent H.36 – H.43, Marc-Antoine Charpentier, LP Harmonia Mundi, 1982. Grand prix du disque académie Charles Cros.
- Anacréon ballet en un acte, Jean-Philippe Rameau, Harmonia Mundi, 1982
- Les Arts florissants H.487, Ouverture de la Comtesse d'Escarbagnas H.494 i & Intermèdes nouveaux du Mariage forcé H.494 ii, Marc-Antoine Charpentier Harmonia Mundi, 1982
- Un Oratorio de Noël; In nativitatem Domini canticum, H.416; Sur la naissance de Notre Seigneur Jésus Christ H.482 de Marc Antoine Charpentier, Harmonia Mundi, 1983
- Ballo delle ingrate : livre VIII des madrigaux; Sestina, Claudio Monteverdi, Harmonia Mundi, 1983
- Médée H.491, tragédie lyrique en un prologue et cinq actes, Marc-Antoine Charpentier, Harmonia Mundi, 1984–2019
  - Grand Prix du Disque Académie Charles Cros, La Référence Compcact magazine, Sélection Télérama ffff, Diapason d'or, Le Timbre d'Argent de la revue Opéra, Diamant de Harmonie panorama musique, Gramophone award 1985, International Record Critics Award Montreux 1985, Prix Opus 1985 USA, Choc de Classica 2019
- Le Reniement de Saint Pierre H.424 ; Méditations pour la Carême H.380 – H.389, Marc-Antoine Charpentier, Harmonia Mundi, 1985
- Missa Assumpta est Maria H.11, Domine salvum H.303, Litanies de la Vierge H.83, Te deum H.146, Marc-Antoine Charpentier, Harmonia Mundi 1988
- Madrigal classique, madrigal soliste, comédie madrigalesque. L’âge d’or du madrigal, Arles, Harmonia Mundi, 1998
- Madrigaux à 5 voix, Carlo Gesualdo, prince de Venosa, Arles, Harmonia Mundi, 1988
- The Fairy-Queen, Henry Purcell, Arles, Harmonia Mundi, 1989
- Oratorio per la Settimana Santa; Un peccator pentito, Luigi Rossi, Arles, Harmonia Mundi, 1989
- Les antiennes "O" de l'Avent : H.36 à H.43 ; Noël sur les instruments : H.534; In Nativitatem D.N.J.C. canticum : H.414, Marc-Antoine Charpentier, Arles, CD Harmonia Mundi, 1990
- Le Malade imaginaire H.495, Marc-Antoine Charpentier, Harmonia Mundi, 1990
- Cantates, Louis-Nicolas Clérambault, Harmonia Mundi, 1990
- Te Deum; Super flumina Babilonis; Confitebor tibi Domine, Michel-Richard Delalande, Harmonia Mundi, 1991
- Les vingt figures réthoriques [sic] d'une passion XX^{e} festival de Saintes, Francesco Cavalli, Luigi Rossi, et al. [S.l.], K. 617, 1991
- Orfeo, Luigi Rossi, Arles, Harmonia Mundi, 1991
- Pièces de clavecin (1724) Les Indes galantes: suite d'orchestre; Anacréon : ballet en un acte, scène 5; In convertendo, grand motet, Jean-Philippe Rameau, Arles, Harmonia Mundi, 1992
- Pygmalion; Nélée et Myrthis, Jean-Philippe Rameau, Arles, Harmonia Mundi, 1992
- Rameau, Jean-Philippe Rameau, Arles, Harmonia Mundi Plus, 1992
- Motets & Madrigaux Il ballo delle ingrate; Selva morale; L'incoronazione di Poppea, Claudio Monteverdi, Arles, Harmonia Mundi, 1992
- Airs de cour (1689), Michel Lambert, Harmonia Mundi, 1992
- Idoménée, André Campra, Arles, Harmonia Mundi, 1992
- Atys, tragédie lyrique en un prologue et cinq actes; Dies Irae; Petits motets; Airs pour le clavecin, Jean-Baptiste Lully, Harmonia Mundi, 1993
- Lully, Jean Baptiste Lully, Arles, France : Harmonia Mundi, 1993
- Te Deum; motets, Guillaume Bouzignac, Arles, Harmonia Mundi, 1993
- King Arthur, Henry Purcell, [S.l.n.d.], 1995 Baroque Festival vol. 1. Firenze, CD Classica, 1993
- Médée H.491, tragédie lyrique en un prologue et cinq actes, Marc-Antoine Charpentier. Erato 1994
  - 10 de Répertoire, Choc du Monde de la Musique, Diapason d'or, Diamant Opéra magazine.
- A Purcell companion, Henry Purcell, Arles, Harmonia Mundi, 1994
- Messiah, George Frideric Handel, Arles, Harmonia Mundi, 1994
- Dido & Æneas, Henry Purcell, Arles, Harmonia Mundi, 1994
- Concerti grossi, Op. 6, George Frideric Handel, Arles, Harmonia Mundi, 1995
- Requiem : KV 626, Ave verum corpus : KV 618, Introitus, Kyrie, Dies irae (excerpts), Wolfgang Amadeus Mozart, Paris, Erato, 1995
- Jefferson in Paris, Richard Robbins, New York, Angel, 1995
- La Descente d’Orphée aux Enfers H.488, Marc-Antoine Charpentier, Erato, 1995
- Les Plaisirs de Versailles H.480, Airs sur les Stances du Cid H.457, H.458, H.459, Amor vince ogni cosa H.492, Erato 1996
- Il Sant'Alessio, Stefano Landi, Paris, Erato, 1996
- De Lully à Rameau, Jean-Baptiste Lully, et al. Harmonia Mundi, 1996
- Il Ballo delle ingrate Sestina, Claudio Monteverdi, Harmonia Mundi, 1996
- Die Zauberflöte KV 620, Wolfgang Amadeus Mozart, Erato, 1996
- Hippolyte et Aricie, Jean-Philippe Rameau, Erato, 1997
- Il Combattimento di Tancredi e Clorinda, Claudio Monteverdi, Harmonia Mundi, 1997
- Leçons de ténèbres, François Couperin, Erato, 1997
- Petits motets, Michel-Richard Delalande, Harmonia Mundi, 1997
- Le Grand Siècle français musique au temps de Louis XIV de Kenneth Gilbert, Arles, Harmonia Mundi, 1997
- Les Fêtes d’Hébé, Jean-Philippe Rameau, [S.l.s.n.], 1997
- Divertissements, airs et concerts, Il faut rire et chanter, dispute de bergers H.424, La Pierre philosophale H.501, + (H.469, H.467, H.442, H.449 b, H.462, H.452, H.443, H.441, H.455, H.467, H.446, H.447, H.454, H.461, H.545) de Marc-Antoine Charpentier, Paris, Erato, 1998
- David et Jonathas H.490, tragédie lyrique en cinq actes, Marc-Antoine Charpentier, Arles, Harmonia Mundi, 1998
- Voyage en Italie : deux siècles de musique à Rome, Venise, Ferrare, 1550-1750, Arles, Harmonia Mundi, 1998
- La musique sacrée à travers les âges, Marc-Antoine Charpentier et al., [S.l.], Harmonia Mundi, 1998
- Musique de ballet 1979-1999 : 20e anniversaire Les Arts Florissants, Jean-Philippe Rameau, Marc-Antoine Charpentier, Paris, Erato, 1999
- Entfuhrung aus dem Serail, Schäfer, Petibon, Christie, Wolfgang Amadeus Mozart, [S.l.n.d], 1999
- Soleil, musiques au siècle de Louis XIV, Paris, Erato, 1999
- Die Entführung aus dem Serail, Wolfgang Amadeus Mozart, Paris, Erato, 1999
- Great Mass in C minor K.427, Wolfgang Amadeus Mozart, Paris, Erato, 1999
- Acis and Galatea, George Frideric Handel, Paris, Erato, 1999
- Castor et Pollux : chœurs et danses, Jean-Philippe Rameau, Arles, Harmonia Mundi, 1999
- Cantates françaises, André Campra, Arles, Harmonia Mundi, 2000
- Messe de minuit H.9, In nativitatem Domini canticum H.416, Noël sur les instruments H.531 N° 2, H.534 N° 3,4,6. Marc-Antoine Charpentier, Erato 2000
- Grands Motets lorrains pour Louis XIV, Henri Desmarets, Paris, Erato, 2000
- Alcina, George Frideric Handel, Paris, Erato, 2000
- Zoroastre, Jean-Philippe Rameau, Paris, Erato, 2002
- Jephté, Michel Pignolet de Montéclair, Arles, Harmonia Mundi, 2002
- Les divertissements de Versailles, Jean-Baptiste Lully, Erato, 2002
- Theodora, George Frideric Handel, Paris, Erato, 2003
- Grands Motets, André Campra, Virgin Classics, 2003
- Selva morale e spirituale , Claudio Monteverdi, Arles, Harmonia Mundi, 2003
- Violin Sonatas, George Frideric Handel, Virgin Classics, 2003
- Il Ritorno d'Ulisse in patria, Claudio Monteverdi, [S.l.], Virgin Classics, 2003
- Marc-Antoine Charpentier, Marc-Antoine Charpentier, Arles, Harmonia Mundi, 2004
- Serse, George Frideric Handel, Virgin Classics, 2004
- Les Boréades, Jean-Philippe Rameau, Waldron, Opus Arte, 2004
- Le Coffret du Tricentenaire , Marc-Antoine Charpentier, Harmonia Mundi, 2004
- Louis XIV Musique à Versailles au temps du Roi Soleil, [S.l.], Harmonia Mundi, 2004
- Grand Office des Morts H.2, H.12, H.311, Te Deum H.146, Marc-Antoine Charpentier, Virgin Classics, 2005
- Salve Regina – Petits Motets, Andre Campra, Francois Couperin, Virgin Classics, 2005
- Les Indes galantes, Jean-Philippe Rameau, Waldron, Opus Arte, 2005
- Chansons de la Renaissance, Harmonia Mundi, 2005
- Judicium Salomonis H.422- (Solomon's judgement), Motet pour une longue Offrande H.434, Marc-Antoine Charpentier, Virgin Classics, 2006
- Le Jardin des voix, Les Arts Florissants / William Christie, Virgin Classics, 2006
- Opera's First Master: The Musical Dramas of Claudio Monteverdi, Claudio Monteverdi, Amadeus Press, 2006
- Handel Arias, George Frideric Handel, Decca, 2007
- Die Schöpfung, Joseph Haydn, Erato, 2007
- Un oratorio de Noël In Nativitatem Domini Canticum H.416, Les Antiennes "O" de l'avent H.36 à H.43, Noëls pour les instruments H.534, Sur la Naissance de Notre Seigneur Jésus Christ H.482 de Marc-Antoine Charpentier, Arles, Harmonia Mundi (1982–1983) 2021
- Campra: Requiem & Miserere, André Campra; Les Arts Florissants / William Christie; Pentatone, 2025
