= William Christie (musician) =

American-born French musician (born 1944)

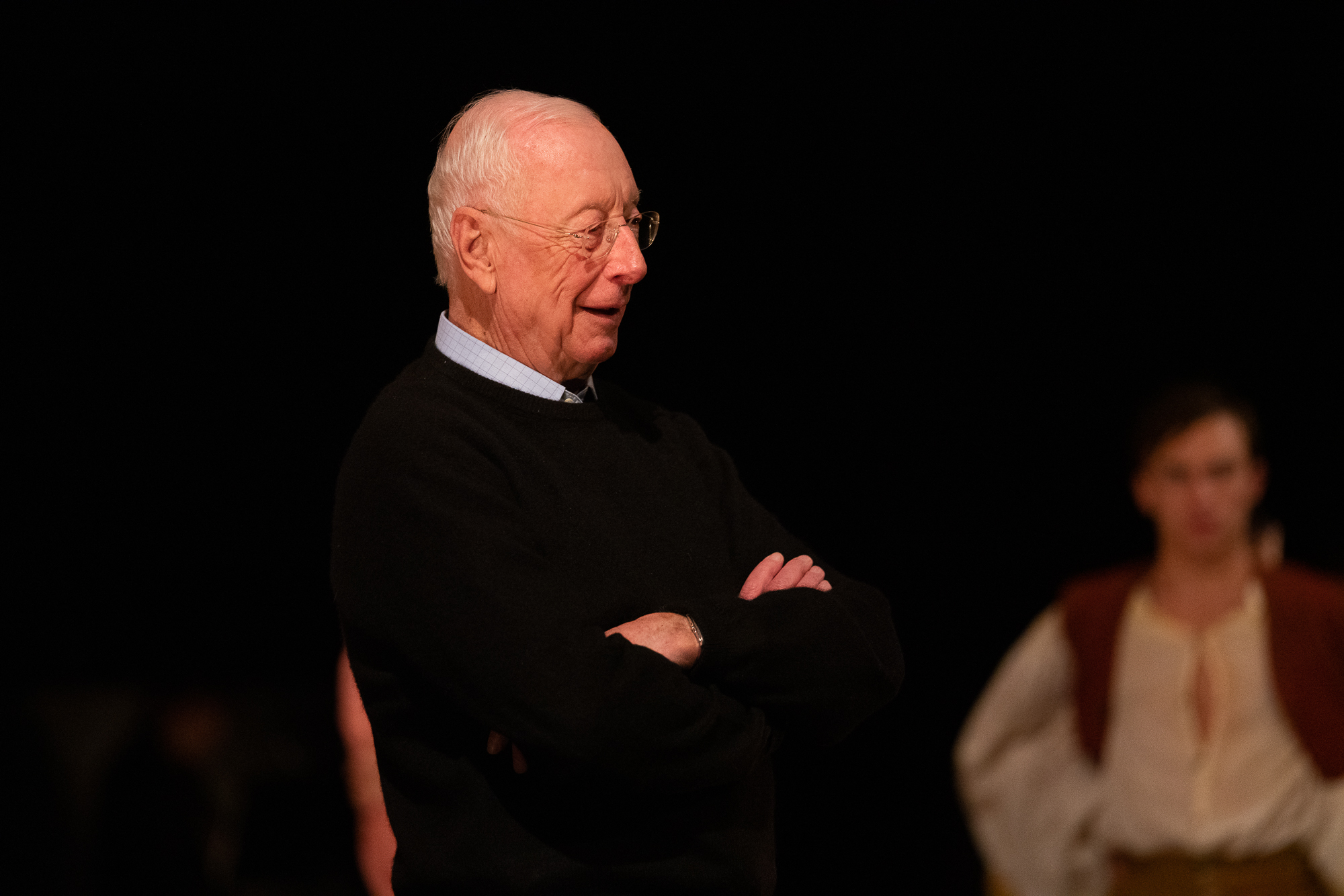
- Christie in 2014
- Born: William Lincoln Christie; December 19, 1944 (age 81); Buffalo, New York, U.S.
- Citizenship: United States; France (since 1995)
- Education: Harvard University; Yale University
- Occupations: Conductor; harpsichordist
- Years active: 1971–present
- Title: Founder of Les Arts Florissants

William Lincoln Christie (born December 19, 1944) is an American-born French conductor and harpsichordist. He is a specialist in baroque and classical repertoire and is the founder of the ensemble Les Arts Florissants.

== Early life and education ==
Christie was born December 19, 1944, in Buffalo, New York.

He studied art history at Harvard University, where he was briefly assistant conductor of the Harvard Glee Club. From 1966, he began studies at Yale University in music, where he was a student of harpsichordist Ralph Kirkpatrick. He was opposed to the Vietnam War, and served in a reserve officers course to avoid the draft.

== Career ==
He subsequently taught at Dartmouth College. When his Dartmouth post was not renewed, Christie moved first to the United Kingdom (1970), and in 1971 to France. He was one of a number of young men who left the United States at this time because of disagreement with the Vietnam War, and in order to avoid the draft. In France, he became known for his interpretations of Baroque music, particularly French Baroque music, working with René Jacobs and others. He also performed contemporary music alongside baroque music with the Ensemble Five Centuries.

As of December 2024, Christie was still actively conducting, in a production with Les Arts Florissants of Rameau's Les Fêtes d'Hébé at the Opéra-Comique in Paris.

Christie took French citizenship in 1995. He was appointed Grand Croix de la Légion d'honneur in 2014 and he is an Officier in the Ordre des Arts et des Lettres. He was elected a member of the French Académie des Beaux-Arts on November 12, 2008, in the "Unattached members" section (Membres libres), at the seat formerly held by Marcel Marceau, Seat #1. The elaborate gardens Christie designed for his house in Thiré were designated as a monument historique in 2006. He has also received the Georges Pompidou Prize (2005) as well as the Liliane Bettencourt Choral Singing Prize, which was awarded by the Académie des Beaux-Arts in 2004. In 2002, he was awarded the Harvard Arts Medal.

== Les Arts Florissants ==
Lea Desandre performs Henry Purcell's Dido and Aeneas with Les Arts Florissants and Christie in 2020

In 1979, Christie founded Les Arts Florissants, named after the opera of the same name by Marc-Antoine Charpentier, which was to be its first fully staged production. Major recognition came in 1987 with the production of Lully's Atys at the Opéra-Comique in Paris. Christie has also presented and recorded many unknown works by Marc-Antoine Charpentier (most of them were world premieres), Médée H.491, David and Jonathas H.490, Le Malade imaginaire H.495, La Descente d'Orphée aux enfers H.488, Les Plaisirs de Versailles H.480, Actéon H.481, many works composed for Christmas time, but also André Campra, Henry Desmarest, Michel-Richard Delalande, François Couperin, Jean-Joseph de Mondonville, Claudio Monteverdi and Jean-Philippe Rameau.

== Teaching ==
Christie was a professor at the Paris Conservatoire from 1982 to 1995, and maintains an active role in pedagogy by participating in master classes and academies. In 2002, he founded Le Jardin des Voix, a biennial academy for young singers in Caen. Since 2007, he has had an affiliation with the Juilliard School, providing master classes in historical performance practice.

== Repertoire ==
Christie has widened his group's core French repertoire, performing Marc-Antoine Charpentier, Henry Purcell, George Frideric Handel, and Wolfgang Amadeus Mozart. He has been guest conductor at the Glyndebourne Festival, and productions for Zurich Opera, Festival d'Aix and the Opéra de Lyon. He has also conducted period-instrument performances with more modern ensembles such as the Berlin Philharmonic. In 2016, he conducted Les Arts Florissants in Bach's B Minor Mass at the Royal Albert Hall Proms.
