= Musikalische Exequien =

1635 funeral music by Heinrich Schütz

- Funeral music by Heinrich Schütz
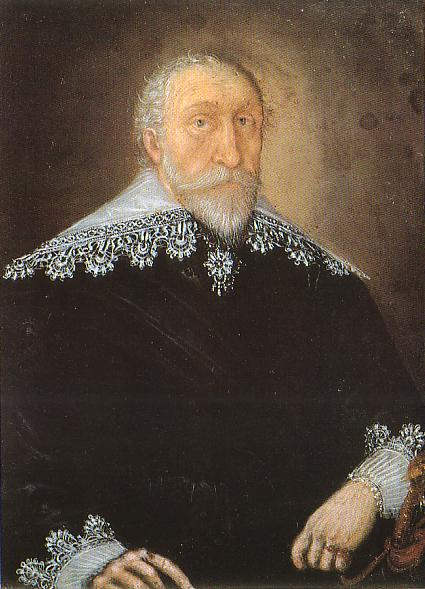
- Henry II, Count of Reuss-Gera
- Catalogue: SWV 279–281
- Opus: 7
- Text: compiled by Henry II, Count of Reuss-Gera
- Language: German
- Composed: 1635 or 1636
- Dedication: Henry II, Count of Reuss-Gera
- Published: 1636 in Dresden
- Scoring: soloists, choir, continuo

Premiere
- Date: 14 February [O.S. 4 February] 1636
- Location: Johanniskirche, Gera

Musikalische Exequien, Op. 7, SWV 279–281, is a sacred funeral music that Heinrich Schütz wrote in 1635 or 1636 for the funeral services of Henry II, Count of Reuss-Gera, who had died on 3 December 1635. It is Schütz's most famous work of funeral music. The work was first performed on 14 February [O.S. 4 February] 1636 in the Johanniskirche in Gera.

Herr, wenn ich nur Dich habe

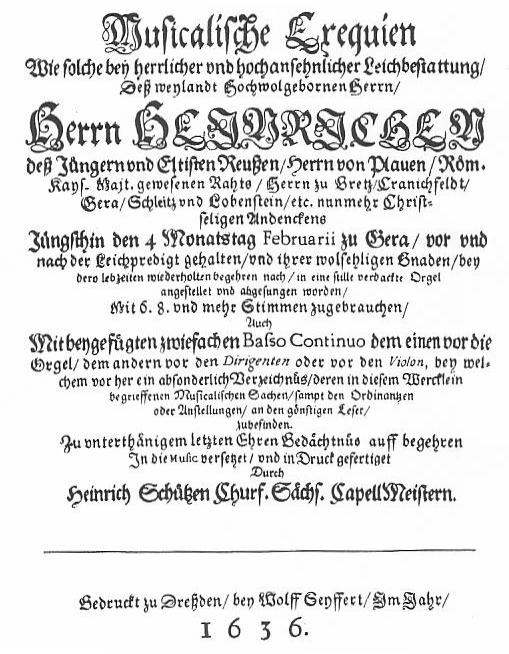
Title page

It comprises three sections:

1. Concert in Form einer teutschen Begräbnis-Messe (SWV 279)
2. Motet Herr, wenn ich nur Dich habe (SWV 280)
3. Canticum Simeonis Herr, nun lässest du deinen Diener (SWV 281)

Henry II had planned the service himself and chose the texts, some of which are scriptural and others of which are from 16th-century Lutheran writers, including Martin Luther himself. He commissioned Schütz to compose the music on the occasion of his death.

Part I, by far the longest part of the work, is scored for SSATTB (2 sopranos, alto, 2 tenors, bass) chorus alternating with small ensembles of soloists. Part II is scored for double choir SATB SATB, and Part III is written for SATTB choir and a trio of soloists. All movements are accompanied by basso continuo.

The work was known to Brahms, as it is thought that he owned a copy of the score; his German Requiem is remarkably similar in content.

The work was the first requiem in the German language.

== Recordings ==
There have been many recordings, making the Exequien the most recorded work of 17th-century German vocal music, including:

- Heinrich Schütz Choir, Munich, conducted by Karl Richter (Archiv Produktion, 1955)
- Dresdner Kreuzchor, conducted by Rudolf Mauersberger (Berlin)
- Westfälische Kantorei, conducted by Wilhelm Ehmann (Cantate)
- Chiaroscuro, conducted by Hans-Martin Linde (EMI)
- Knabenchor Hannover, conducted by Heinz Hennig (Ars Musici)
- Madrigal Ensemble, conducted by Stoyan Kralev (Forlane)
- The Schutz Academy, conducted by Howard Arman (Berlin)
- Chapelle Royale, conducted by Philippe Herreweghe (Harmonia Mundi)
- Monteverdi Choir, conducted by John Eliot Gardiner, (Archiv Produktion)
- Alsfelder Vokalensemble, Himlische Cantorey, I Febiarmonici, conducted by Wolfgang Helbich (Naxos)
- Weser Renaissance Bremen, conducted by Manfred Cordes (cpo)
- Motettenchor Stuttgart, conducted by Günter Graulich (Carus)
- Cappella Augustana, conducted by Matteo Messori (Brilliant Classics)
- La Chapelle Rhénane, conducted by Benoît Haller (K617)
- Akadêmia, conducted by Françoise Lasserre with La Fenice, conducted by Jean Tubéry (Pierre Verany/Arion)
- Amarcord & Cappella Sagittariana Dresden, conducted by Norbert Schuster (Raumklang)
- American Bach Soloists, conducted by Jeffrey Thomas (own label)
- Vox Luminis, conducted by Lionel Meunier (Ricercar) – winner of Gramophone Awards 2012
- Dresdner Kammerchor, conducted by Hans-Christoph Rademann (Carus)
- La Petite Bande, conducted by Sigiswald Kuijken (Accent)
- Theatre of Early Music, Schola Cantorum, conducted by Daniel Taylor (Analekta)
- Ensemble Sagittarius, conducted by Michel Laplénie (Editions Hortus)
- BachPlus, conducted by Bart Naessens (Etcetera)
- Voces Suaves, conducted by Johannes Strobl (Arcana)
- Stuttgart Hymnus Boys Choir, conducted by Rainer Johannes Homburg & Musica Fiata, conducted by Roland Wilson (MD&G)
- The Sixteen & The Symphony of Harmony and Invention, conducted by Harry Christophers (CORO)
