= Un Concert pour Mazarin =

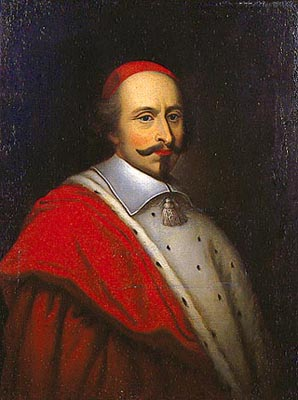

Compilation album by various composers
- Released: 2004
- Genre: Classical
- Label: Virgin Classics

Un Concert pour Mazarin is a music recording released on compact disc in early 2004 by Virgin Classics. It is a performance of 17th century Italian music selected by the conductor, Jean Tubéry to have been influential in French culture at the time of Cardinal Mazarin, a 17th-century chief minister of France. The music is performed by the countertenor Philippe Jaroussky, along with the instrumentalists of Ensemble La Fenice.

== Track listing ==
The following list shows the tracks of this recording. Composers of each of the pieces, if known, are indicated in parentheses. Composers of the remaining pieces are unknown. The recording is sixty minutes and forty-eight seconds in length.

1. Acclamate de terra, motet (Maurizio Cazzati)
2. Capriccio for keyboard in G major (Girolamo Frescobaldi)
3. O quam clemens, motet (Francesco Foggia)
4. Sonata à tre "sopra la Monica" (Francesco Turini)
5. "Fugue à quatre parties sur un sujet italien" (François Roberday)
6. "Sancta Maria" (Claudio Monteverdi)
7. Canzon francese in riposta, per cornetto e violino (Lodovico Viadana)
8. "Surge, propera, amica mea" (Giovanni Paolo Cima)
9. "Laudate pueri" for voice and three instruments (Nicolò Fontei)
10. "Capriccio e ciaccona" for chamber ensemble (Maurizio Cazzati)
11. "Passacaille pour le clavecin" (Luigi Rossi)
- In caligine umbrosa cantata (Giovanni Battista Bassani):
12. "In caligne umbrosa / Festinate, o penæ terrenæ / Ah! non conturbate", recitative, aria, recitative
13. "Alta gloria, cara vita! / Anhelo spe costante", aria, recitative
14. "O auræ serenaæ / Ardeno suspiro / Jam gratæ memoriæ", aria, recitative, aria
