= Historically informed performance =

Approach to the performance of classical music

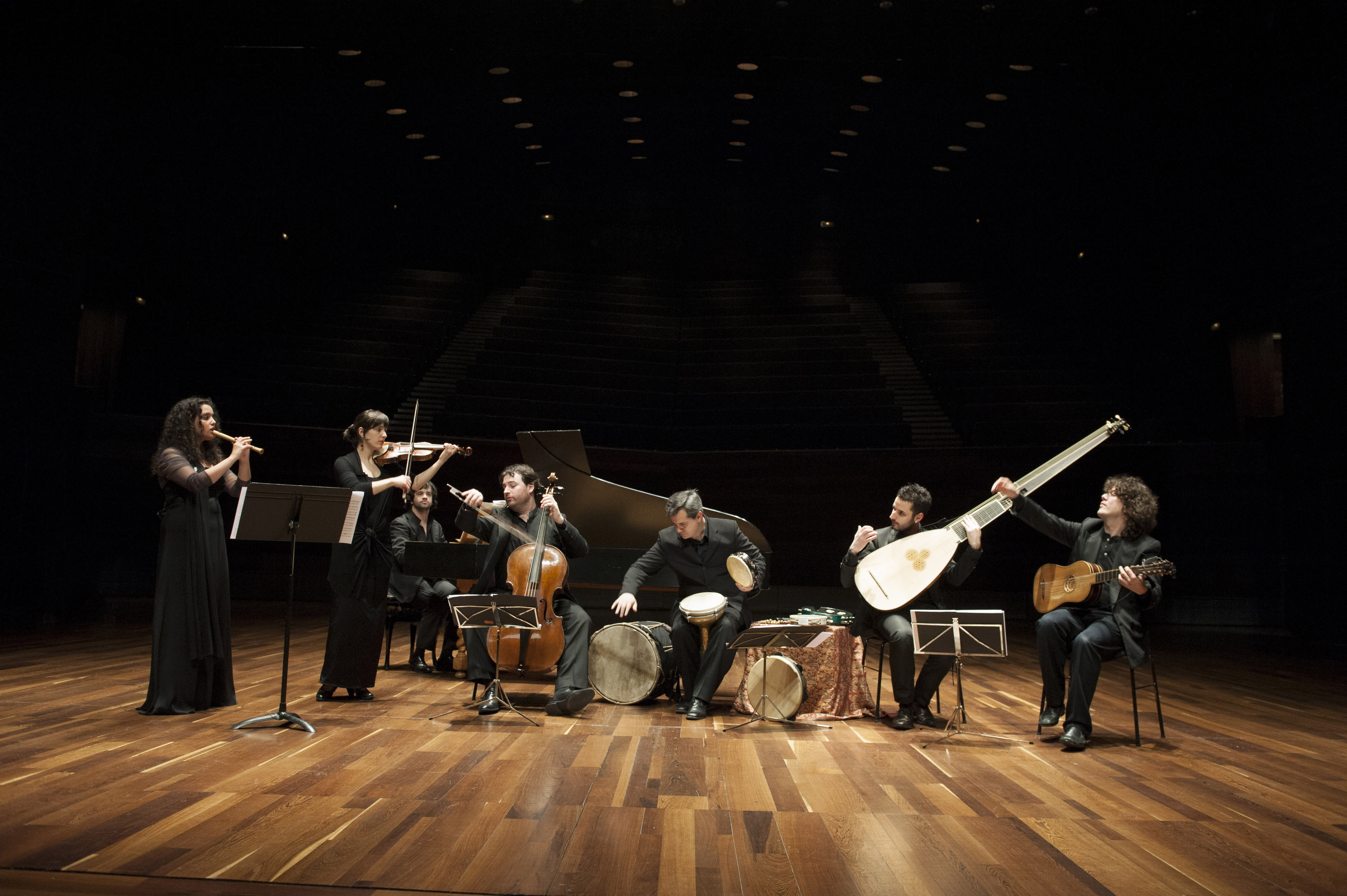
Performance on period instruments is a key aspect of HIP, such as this baroque orchestra (Photo: Josetxu Obregón and the Spanish ensemble La Ritirata, 2013).

Historically informed performance (also referred to as period performance, authentic performance, or HIP) is an approach to the performance of classical music which aims to be faithful to the approach, manner and style of the musical era in which a work was originally conceived.

It is based on two key aspects: the application of the stylistic and technical aspects of performance, known as performance practice; and the use of period instruments which may be reproductions of historical instruments that were in use at the time of the original composition, and which usually have different timbre and temperament from their modern equivalents. A further area of study, that of changing listener expectations, is increasingly under investigation.

Since no sound recordings exist of music before the late 19th century, historically informed performance is largely derived from musicological analysis of texts. Historical treatises, pedagogic tutor books, and concert critiques, as well as additional historical evidence, are all used to gain insight into the performance practice of a historic era. Extant recordings (cylinders, discs, and reproducing piano rolls) from the 1890s onwards have enabled scholars of 19th-century Romanticism to gain a uniquely detailed understanding of this style, although not without significant remaining questions. In all eras, HIP performers will normally use original sources (manuscript or facsimile), or scholarly or urtext editions of a musical score as a basic template, while additionally applying a range of contemporaneous stylistic practices, including rhythmic alterations and ornamentation of many kinds.

Historically informed performance was principally developed in a number of Western countries in the mid to late 20th century, ironically a modernist response to the modernist break with earlier performance traditions. Initially concerned with the performance of Medieval, Renaissance, and Baroque music, HIP now encompasses music from the Classical and Romantic eras. HIP has been a crucial part of the early music revival movement of the 20th and 21st centuries, and has begun to affect the theatrical stage, for instance in the production of Baroque opera, where historically informed approaches to acting and scenery are also used.

Some critics contest the methodology of the HIP movement, contending that its selection of practices and aesthetics are a product of the 20th century and that it is ultimately impossible to know what performances of an earlier time sounded like. The older the style and repertoire, the greater the cultural distance and the increased possibility of misunderstanding the evidence. For this reason, the term "historically informed" is now preferred to "authentic", as it acknowledges the limitations of academic understanding, rather than implying absolute accuracy in recreating historical performance style or a moralising tone.

== Early instruments ==
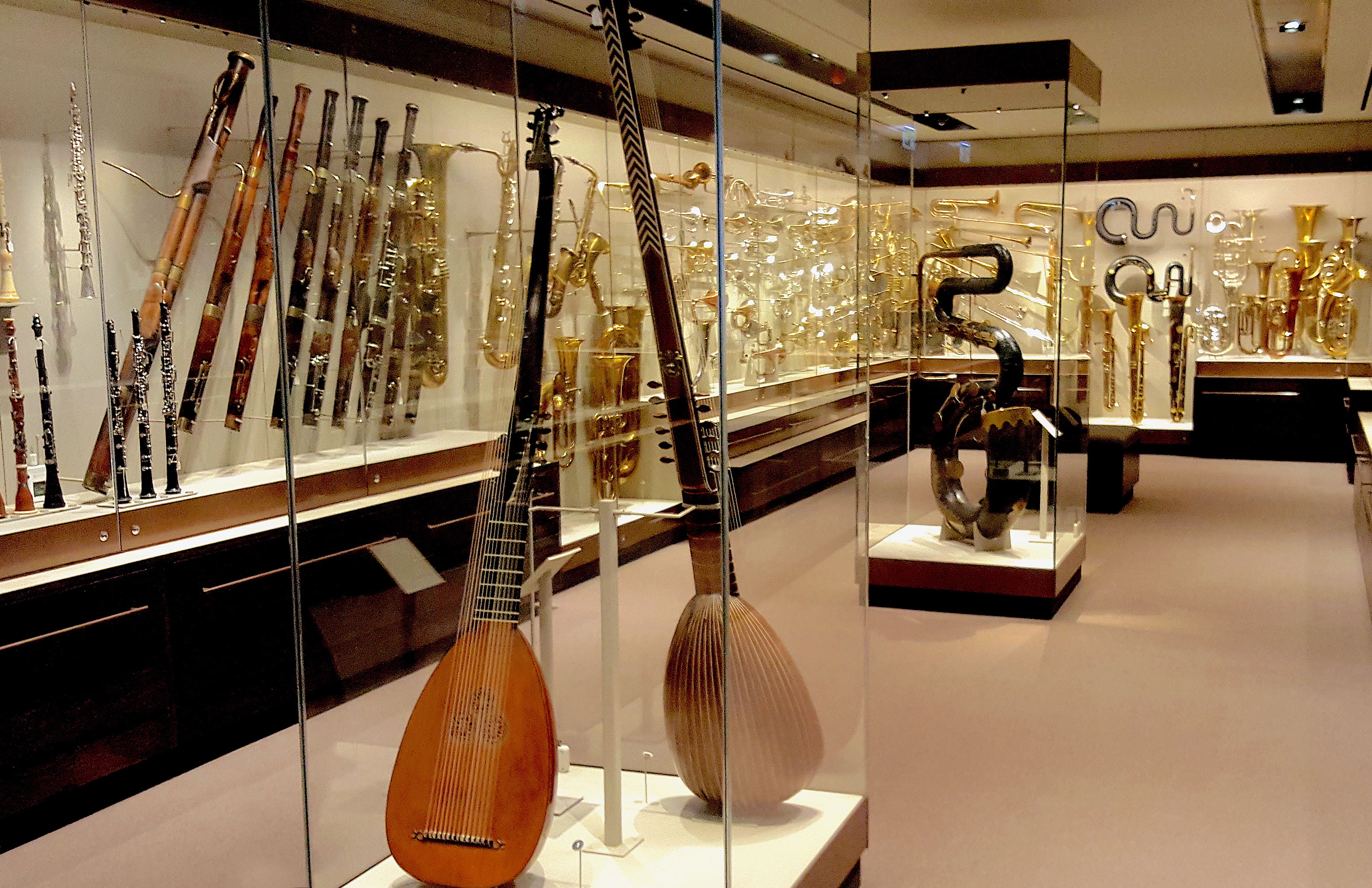
Historical collections of preserved instruments help researchers (St Cecilia's Hall, Edinburgh)

The choice of musical instruments is an important part of the principle of historically informed performance. Musical instruments have evolved over time, and instruments that were in use in earlier periods of history are often quite different from their modern equivalents. Many other instruments have fallen out of use, having been replaced by newer tools for creating music. For example, prior to the emergence of the modern violin, other bowed stringed instruments such as the rebec or the viol were in common use. The existence of ancient instruments in museum collections has helped musicologists to understand how the different design, tuning and tone of instruments may have affected earlier performance practice.

As well as a research tool, historic instruments have an active role in the practice of historically informed performance. Modern instrumentalists who aim to recreate a historic sound often use modern reproductions of period instruments (and occasionally original instruments) on the basis that this will deliver a musical performance that is thought to be historically faithful to the original work, as the original composer would have heard it. For example, a modern music ensemble staging a performance of music by Johann Sebastian Bach may play reproduction Baroque violins instead of modern instruments in an attempt to create the sound of a 17th-century Baroque orchestra.

This has led to the revival of musical instruments that had entirely fallen out of use, and to a reconsideration of the role and structure of instruments also used in current practice.

Orchestras and ensembles who are noted for their use of period instruments in performances include the Taverner Consort and Players (directed by Andrew Parrott), the Academy of Ancient Music (Christopher Hogwood), the Concentus Musicus Wien (Nikolaus Harnoncourt), The English Concert (Trevor Pinnock), the Hanover Band (Roy Goodman), the Orchestra of the Eighteenth Century (Frans Brüggen), the English Baroque Soloists (Sir John Eliot Gardiner), Musica Antiqua Köln (Reinhard Goebel), Amsterdam Baroque Orchestra & Choir (Ton Koopman), the La Cetra Barockorchester Basel and the Venice Baroque Orchestra (Andrea Marcon), Les Talens Lyriques (Christophe Rousset), Les Arts Florissants (William Christie), Le Concert des Nations (Jordi Savall), La Petite Bande (Sigiswald Kuijken), La Chapelle Royale (Philippe Herreweghe), , Concert de la Loge Olympique (Julien Chauvin), the Australian Brandenburg Orchestra (Paul Dyer), New Orleans Musica da Camera (Milton Scheuermann and Thais St. Julien), and the Freiburger Barockorchester (Gottfried von der Goltz). As the scope of historically informed performance has expanded to encompass the works of the Romantic era, the specific sound of 19th-century instruments has increasingly been recognised in the HIP movement, and period instruments orchestras such as Gardiner's Orchestre Révolutionnaire et Romantique have emerged.

=== Harpsichord ===
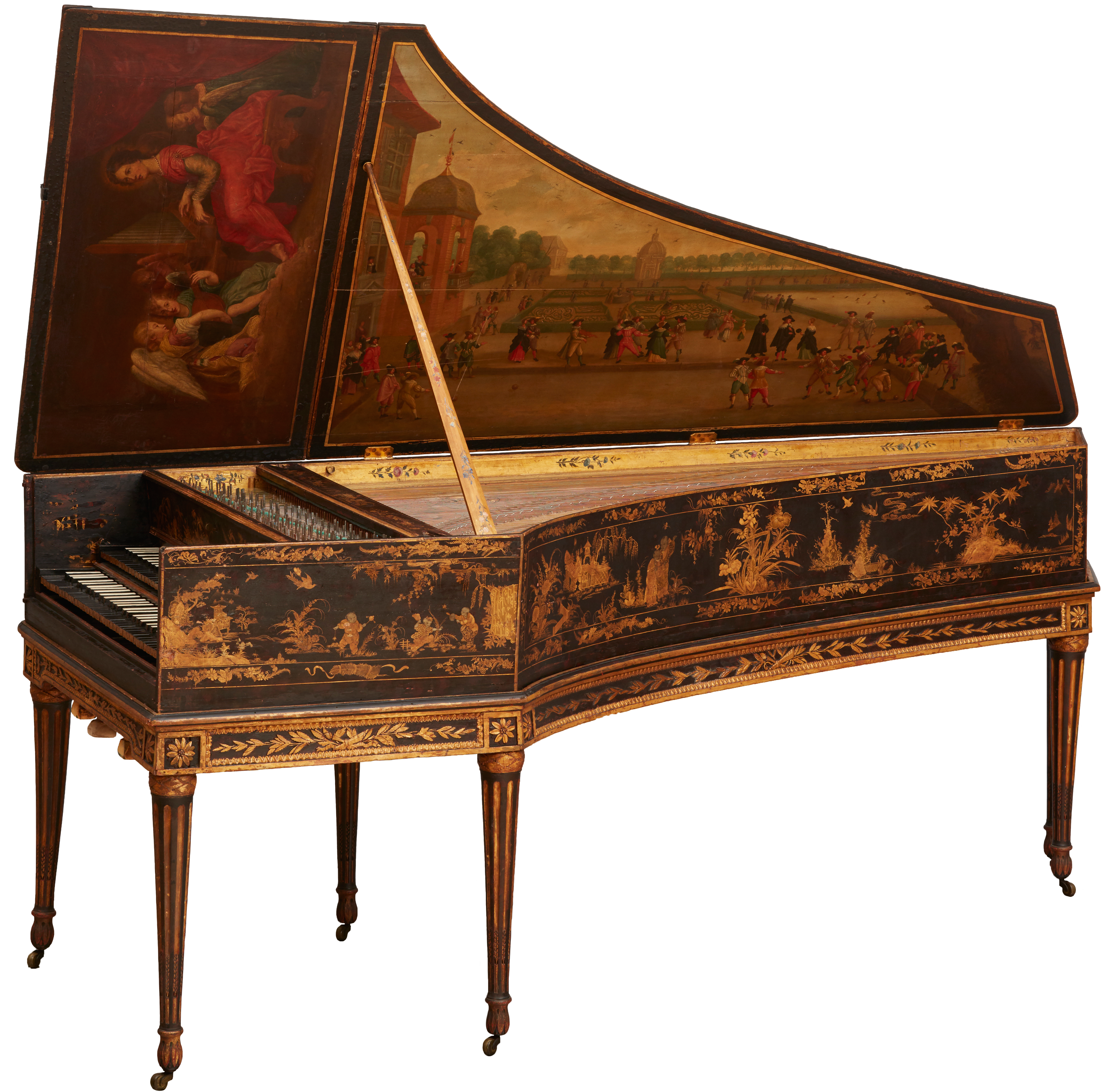
Harpsichord by Pascal Taskin, Paris (1780) (Museum für Kunst und Gewerbe Hamburg)

A variety of once obsolete keyboard instruments such as the clavichord and the harpsichord have been revived, as they have particular importance in the performance of Early music. Before the evolution of the symphony orchestra led by a conductor, Renaissance and Baroque orchestras were commonly directed from the harpsichord; the director would lead by playing continuo, which would provide a steady, harmonic structure upon which the other instrumentalists would embellish their parts. Many religious works of the era made similar use of the pipe organ, often in combination with a harpsichord. Historically informed performances frequently make use of keyboard-led ensemble playing.

Composers such as François Couperin, Domenico Scarlatti, Girolamo Frescobaldi, and Johann Sebastian Bach wrote for the harpsichord, clavichord, and organ.

Among the foremost modern players of the harpsichord are Ralph Kirkpatrick, Scott Ross, Karl Richter, Alan Curtis, William Christie, Christopher Hogwood, Robert Hill, Igor Kipnis, Ton Koopman, Bob van Asperen, Wanda Landowska, Davitt Moroney, Kenneth Gilbert, Gustav Leonhardt, Pieter-Jan Belder, Trevor Pinnock, Skip Sempé, Andreas Staier, Colin Tilney, and Christophe Rousset.

=== Fortepiano ===
During the second half of the 18th century, the harpsichord was gradually replaced by the earliest pianos. As the harpsichord went out of fashion, many were destroyed; indeed, the Paris Conservatory is notorious for having used harpsichords for firewood during the French Revolution and Napoleonic times. Although names were originally interchangeable, the term 'fortepiano' now indicates the earlier, smaller style of piano, with the more familiar 'pianoforte' used to describe the larger instruments approaching modern designs from around 1830. In the 20th and 21st centuries, the fortepiano has enjoyed a revival as a result of the trend for historically informed performance, with the works of Haydn, Mozart, Beethoven and Schubert now often played on fortepiano. Increasingly, the early to mid 19th century pianos of Pleyel, Érard, Streicher and others are being used to recreate the soundscape of Romantic composers such as Chopin, Liszt and Brahms.

Many keyboard players who specialise in the harpsichord also specialise in the fortepiano and other period instruments. Some keyboardists renowned for their fortepiano playing are Ronald Brautigam, Kristian Bezuidenhout, Melvyn Tan, Steven Lubin, Bart van Oort, Gary Cooper, Viviana Sofronitsky, Paul Badura-Skoda, Ingrid Haebler, Robert Levin, Alexei Lubimov, Malcolm Bilson and Tobias Koch.

=== Viol ===
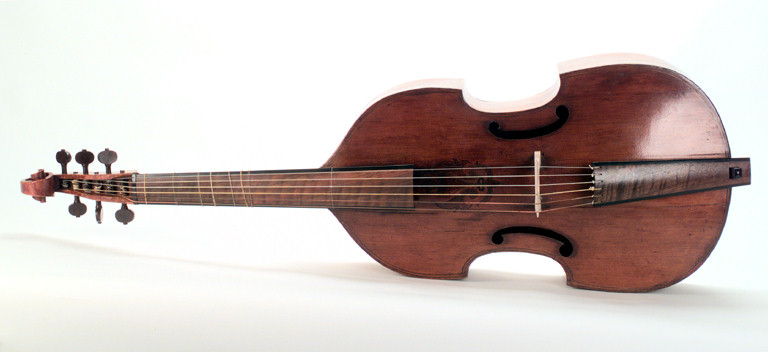
A Viola da gamba by Thomas Cole (c. 1680)

The sound of a Modern-era cello
Sarabande from Bach's Cello Suite no. 1 in G major, BWV 1007, played on a modern cello

The sound of a Baroque-era viola da gamba
Carl Friedrich Abel's Sonata in G-Major played on a Viola da Gamba

A vast quantity of music for viols, for both ensemble and solo performance, was written by composers of the Renaissance and Baroque eras, including Diego Ortiz, Claudio Monteverdi, William Byrd, William Lawes, Henry Purcell, Monsieur de Sainte-Colombe, J.S. Bach, Georg Philipp Telemann, Marin Marais, Antoine Forqueray, and Carl Frederick Abel.

From largest to smallest, the viol family consists of:

- violone (two sizes, a contrabass an octave below the bass, and a smaller one a fourth or fifth above, a great bass)
- bass viol (about the size of a cello)
- tenor viol (about the size of a guitar)
- alto viol (slightly smaller than the tenor)
- treble or descant viol (about the size of a viola)
- pardessus de viole (about the size of a violin)

Among the foremost modern players of the viols are Paolo Pandolfo, Sigiswald and Wieland Kuijken, Nikolaus Harnoncourt, Jordi Savall, John Hsu, and Vittorio Ghielmi. There are many modern viol consorts.

=== Recorder ===
Although largely supplanted by the flute in the 19th century, the recorder has experienced a revival with the HIP movement. Arnold Dolmetsch did much to revive the recorder as a serious concert instrument, reconstructing a "consort of recorders (descant, treble, tenor and bass) all at low pitch and based on historical originals". Handel and Telemann, both noted recorder players, wrote several solo pieces for the instrument. Often, recorder players start off as flautists, then transition into focusing on the recorder. Some famous recorder players include Frans Brüggen, Barthold Kuijken, Michala Petri, Ashley Solomon and Giovanni Antonini.

== Singing ==
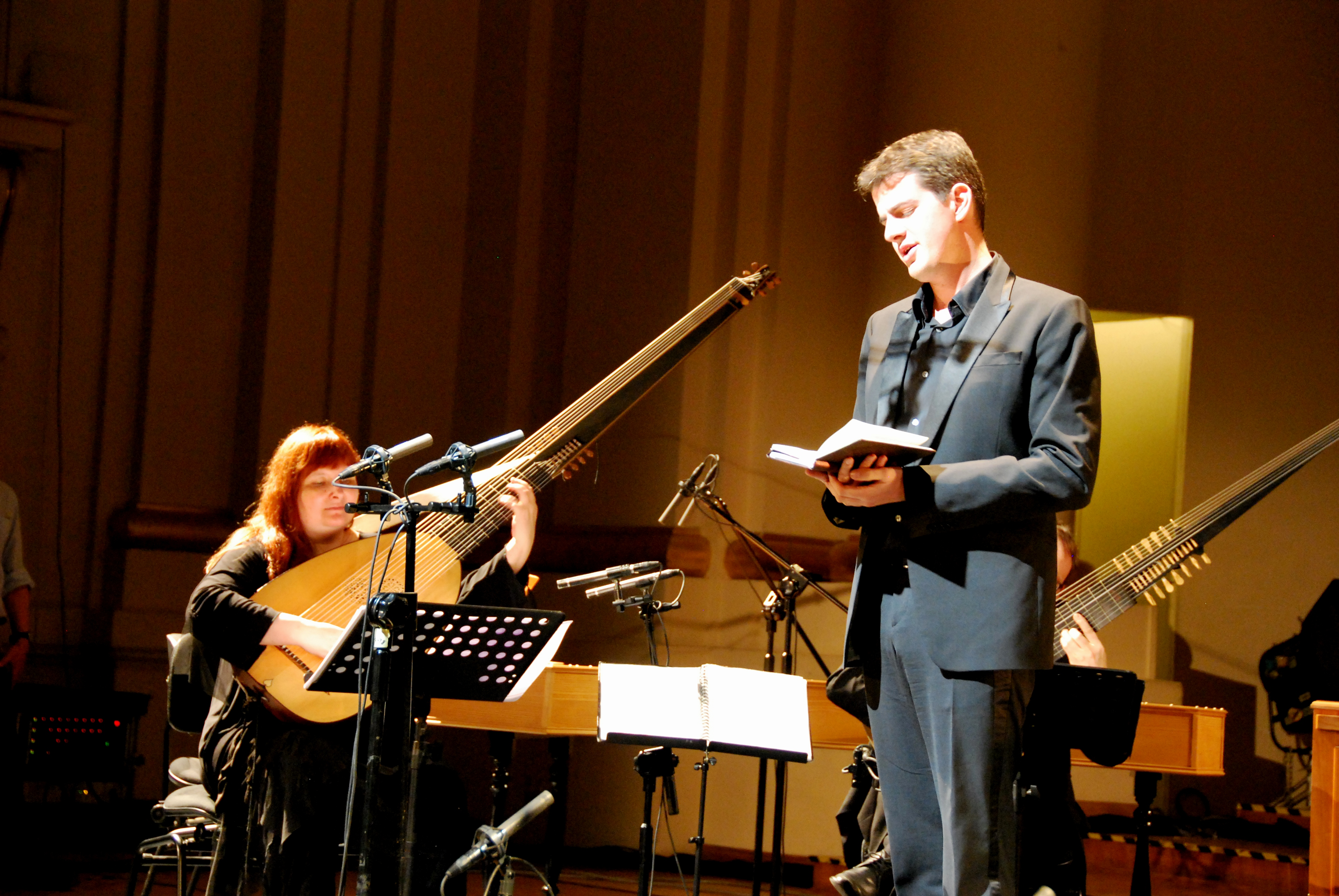
Countertenor Philippe Jaroussky, accompanied by Christina Pluhar in 2011 (theorbo)

As with instrumental technique, the approach to historically informed performance practice for singers has been shaped by musicological research and academic debate. In particular, there was debate around the use of the technique of vibrato at the height of the Early music revival, and many advocates of HIP aimed to eliminate vibrato in favour of the "pure" sound of straight-tone singing. The difference in style may be demonstrated by the sound of a boy treble in contrast to the sound of an opera singer such as Maria Callas.

Certain historic vocal techniques have gained in popularity, such as trillo, a tremolo-like repetition of a single note that was used for ornamental effect in the early Baroque era. Academic understanding of these expressive devices is often subjective however, as many vocal techniques discussed by treatise writers in the 17th and 18th centuries have different meanings, depending on the author. Despite the fashion for straight tone, many prominent Early music singers make use of a subtle, gentle form of vibrato to add expression to their performance.

A few of the singers who have contributed to the historically informed performance movement are Emma Kirkby, Max van Egmond, Julianne Baird, Nigel Rogers, and David Thomas.

The resurgence of interest in Early music, particularly in sacred renaissance polyphony and Baroque opera, has driven a revival of the countertenor voice. High-voice male singers are often cast in preference to female contraltos in HIP opera productions, partly as a substitute for castrato singers. Alfred Deller is considered to have been a pioneer of the modern revival of countertenor singing. Leading contemporary performers include James Bowman, Russell Oberlin, Paul Esswood, Derek Lee Ragin, Andreas Scholl, Michael Chance, René Jacobs, David Daniels, Daniel Taylor, Brian Asawa, Yoshikazu Mera, Jakub Józef Orliński, and Philippe Jaroussky.

== Layout ==
Standard practice concerning the layout of a group of performers, for example in a choir or an orchestra, has changed over time. Determining a historically appropriate layout of singers and instruments on a performance stage may be informed by historical research. In addition to documentary evidence, musicologists may also turn to iconographic evidence — contemporary paintings and drawings of performing musicians — as a primary source for historic information. Pictorial sources may reveal various practices such as the size of an ensemble; the position of various types of instruments; their position in relation to a choir or keyboard instrument; the position or absence of a conductor; whether the performers are seated or standing; and the performance space (such as a concert hall, palace chamber, domestic house, church, or outdoors etc.). The German theorist Johann Mattheson, in a 1739 treatise, states that the singers should stand in front of the instrumentalists.

Three main layouts are documented:

- Circle (Renaissance)
- Choir in the front of the instruments (17th–19th century)
- Singers and instruments next to each other on the choir loft.

=== Gallery ===
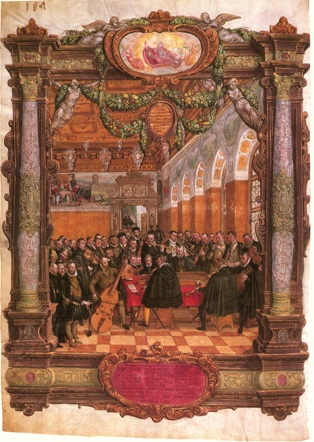
Renaissance composer Orlando de Lassus directing a chamber ensemble

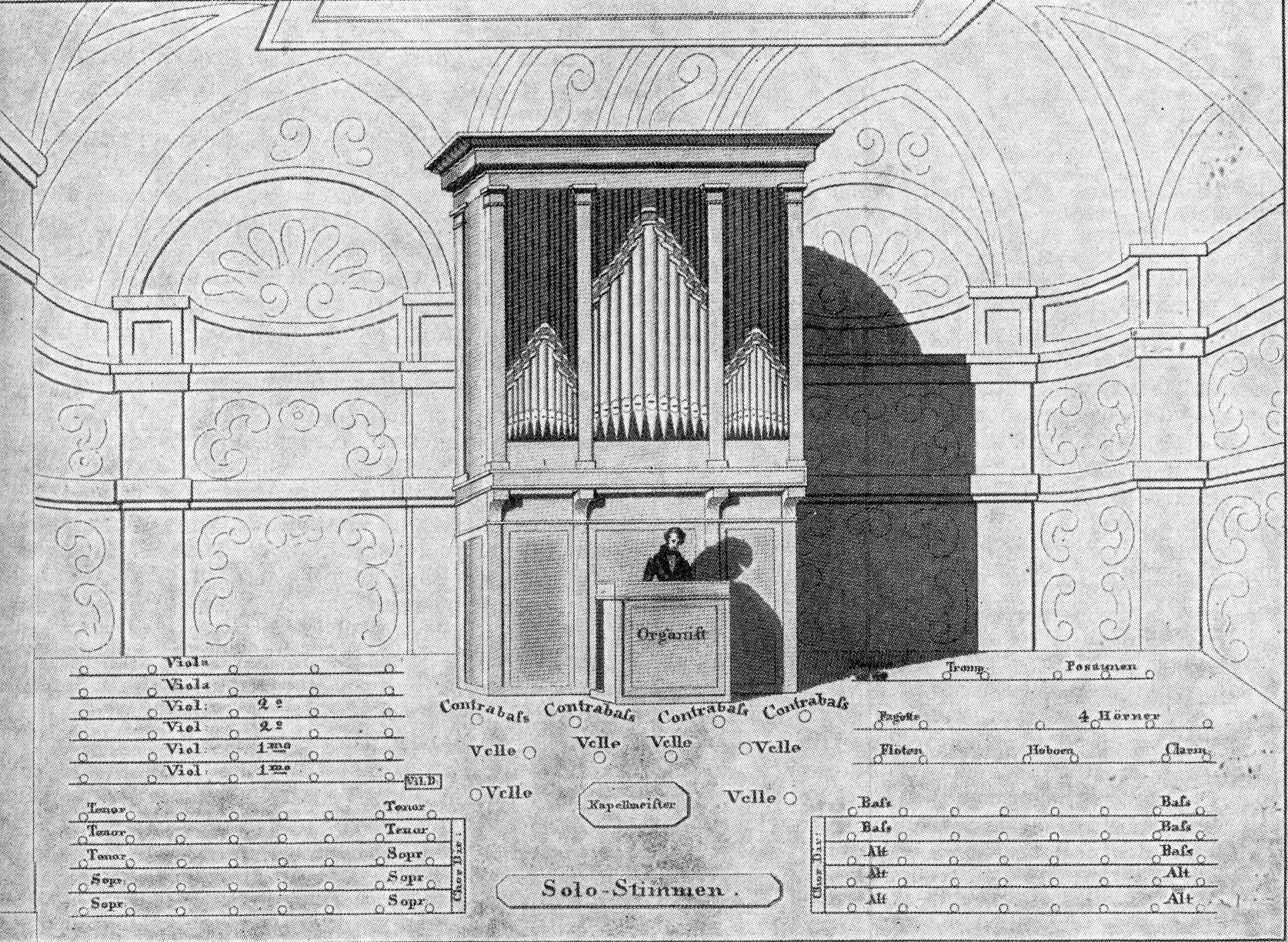
An 1837 sketch of the layout of a choir and orchestra

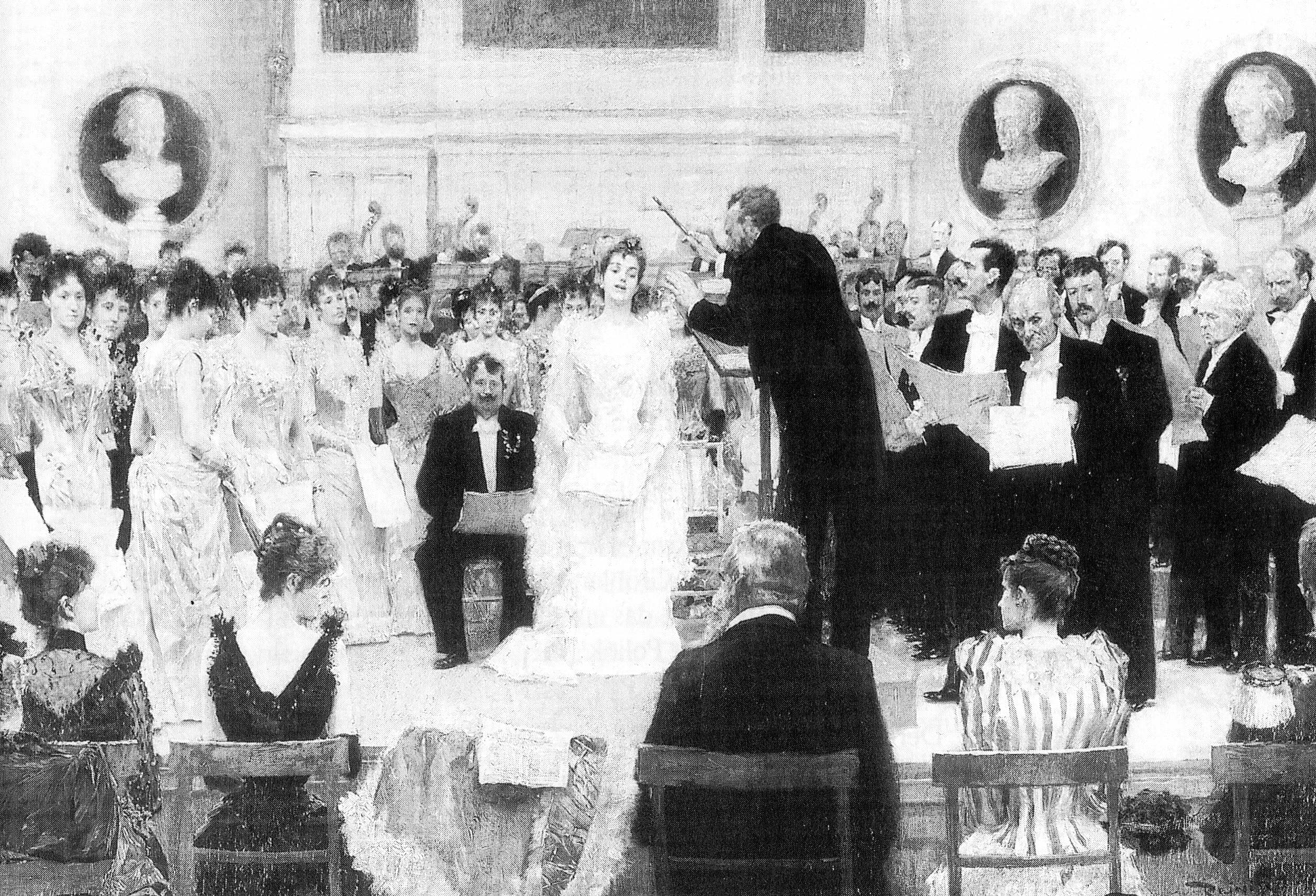
A drawing of an 1890 concert in Munich, Germany

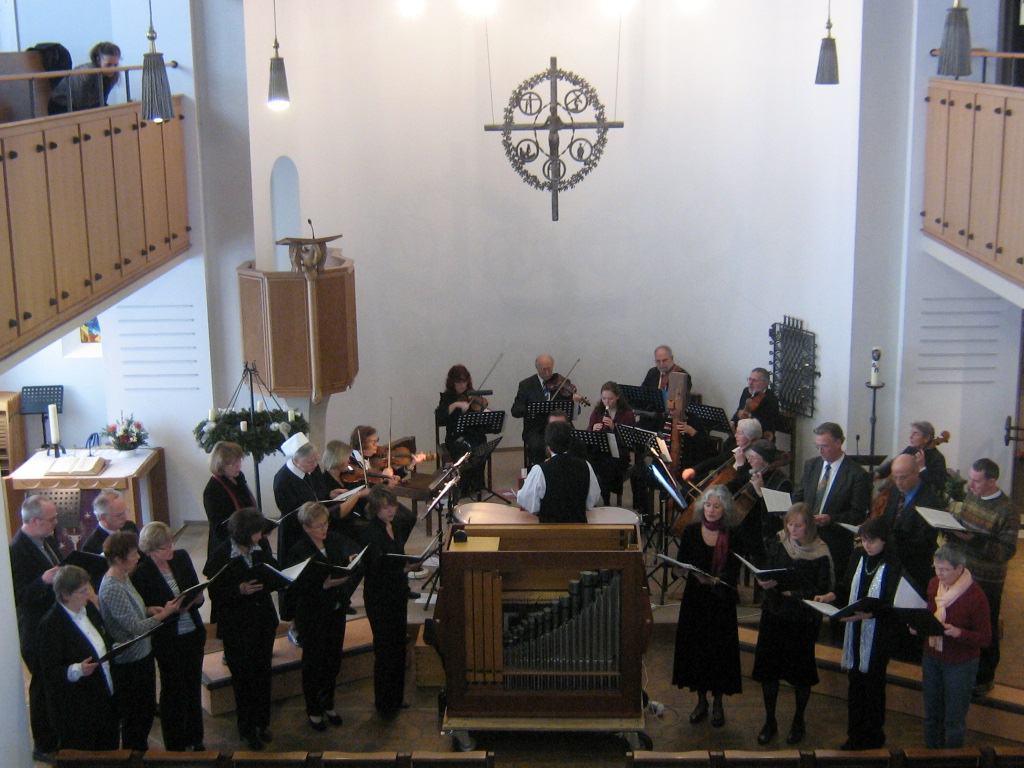
A choir with instrumentalists, in historic layout

== Recovering early performance practices ==
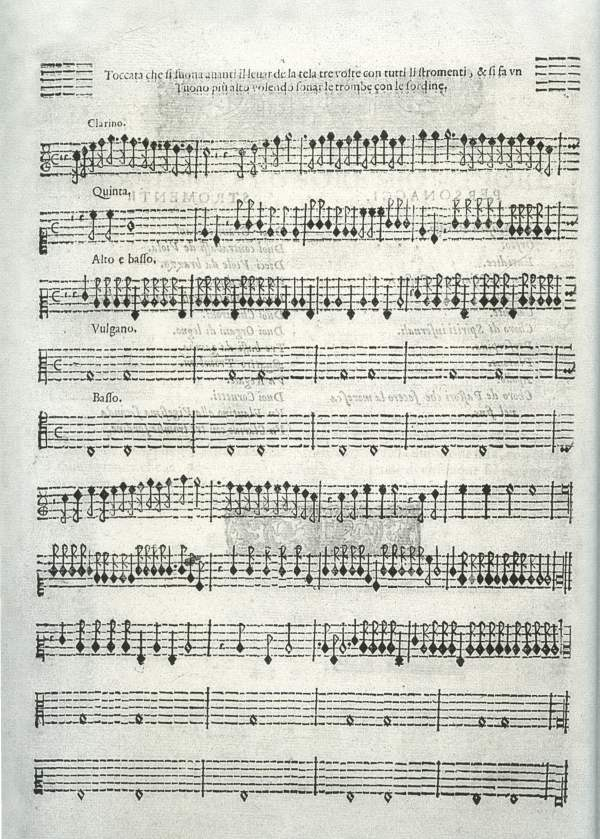
Reprint of the 1st Edition of Monteverdi's L'Orfeo (1609); musicologists refer to autograph scores or early editions to interpret performance practice

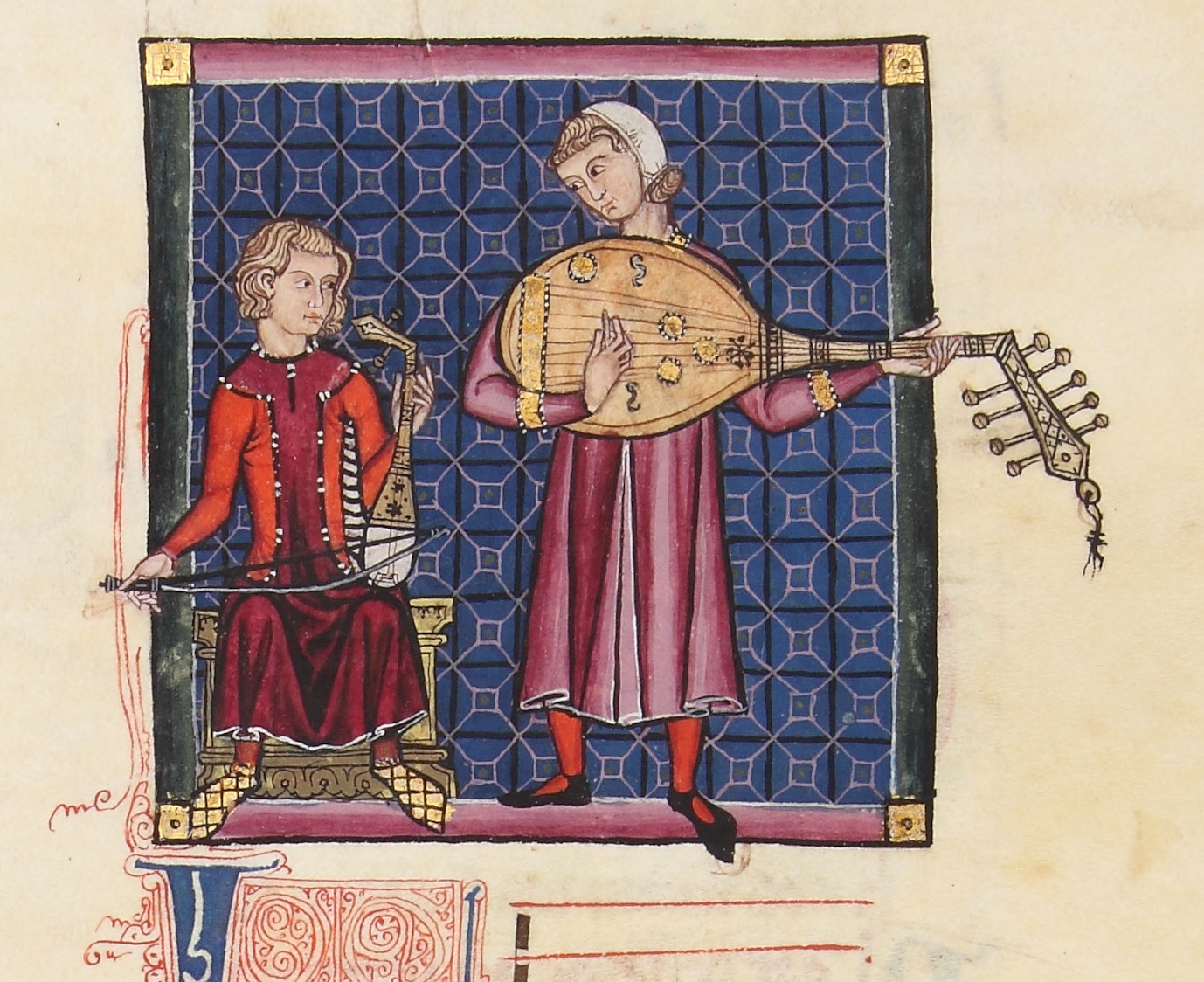
Historical images, such as this Galician 13th-century illustration of lutanists, can inform modern performance practice, but must be interpreted with caution

=== Interpreting musical notation ===
Some familiar difficult items are as follows:

- Early composers often wrote using the same symbols as today, yet in a different meaning, often context-dependent. For example, what is written as an appoggiatura is often meant to be longer or shorter than the notated length, and even in scores as late as the 19th century there is disagreement over the meaning (dynamic and/or agogic) of hairpins.
- The notation may be partial. E.g., the note durations may be omitted altogether, such as in unmeasured preludes, pieces written without rhythm or metre indications. Even when the notation is comprehensive, non-notated changes are usually required, such as rhythmic shaping of passagework, pauses between sections, or additional arpeggiation of chords. Cuts and repetitions were common.
- The music may be written using alternative, non-modern notations, such as tablature. Some tablature notations are only partially decoded, such as the notation in the harp manuscript by Robert ap Huw.
- The reference pitch of earlier music cannot generally be interpreted as designating the same pitch used today.
- Various tuning systems (temperaments), are used. Composers always assume the player will choose the temperament, and never indicate it in the score.
- In most ensemble music up to the early Baroque, the actual musical instruments to be used are not indicated in the score, and must be partially or totally chosen by the performers. A well-discussed example can be found in Monteverdi's L'Orfeo, where the indications on which instruments to use are partial and limited to critical sections only.
- Issues of pronunciation, that impact on musical accents, carry over to church Latin, the language in which a large amount of early vocal music was written. The reason is that Latin was customarily pronounced using the speech sounds and patterns of the local vernacular language.

=== Mechanical music ===
Some information about how music sounded in the past can be obtained from contemporary mechanical instruments. For instance, the Dutch Museum Speelklok owns an 18th-century mechanical organ of which the music programme was composed and supervised by Joseph Haydn.

=== Tuning and pitch ===
Until modern era, different tuning references have been used in different venues. The baroque oboist Bruce Haynes has extensively investigated surviving wind instruments and even documented a case of violinists having to retune by a minor third to play at neighboring churches.

=== Iconographic evidence ===
The research of musicologists often overlaps with the work of art historians; by examining paintings and drawings of performing musicians contemporary to a particular musical era, academics can infer details about performance practice of the day. In addition to showing the layout of an orchestra or ensemble, a work of art may reveal detail about contemporary playing techniques, for example the manner of holding a bow or a wind player's embouchure. However, just as an art historian must evaluate a work of art, a scholar of musicology must also assess the musical evidence of a painting or illustration in its historical context, taking into consideration the potential cultural and political motivations of the artist and allow for artistic license. An historic image of musicians may present an idealised or even fictional account of musical instruments, and there is as much a risk that it may give rise to a historically misinformed performance.

== Issues ==
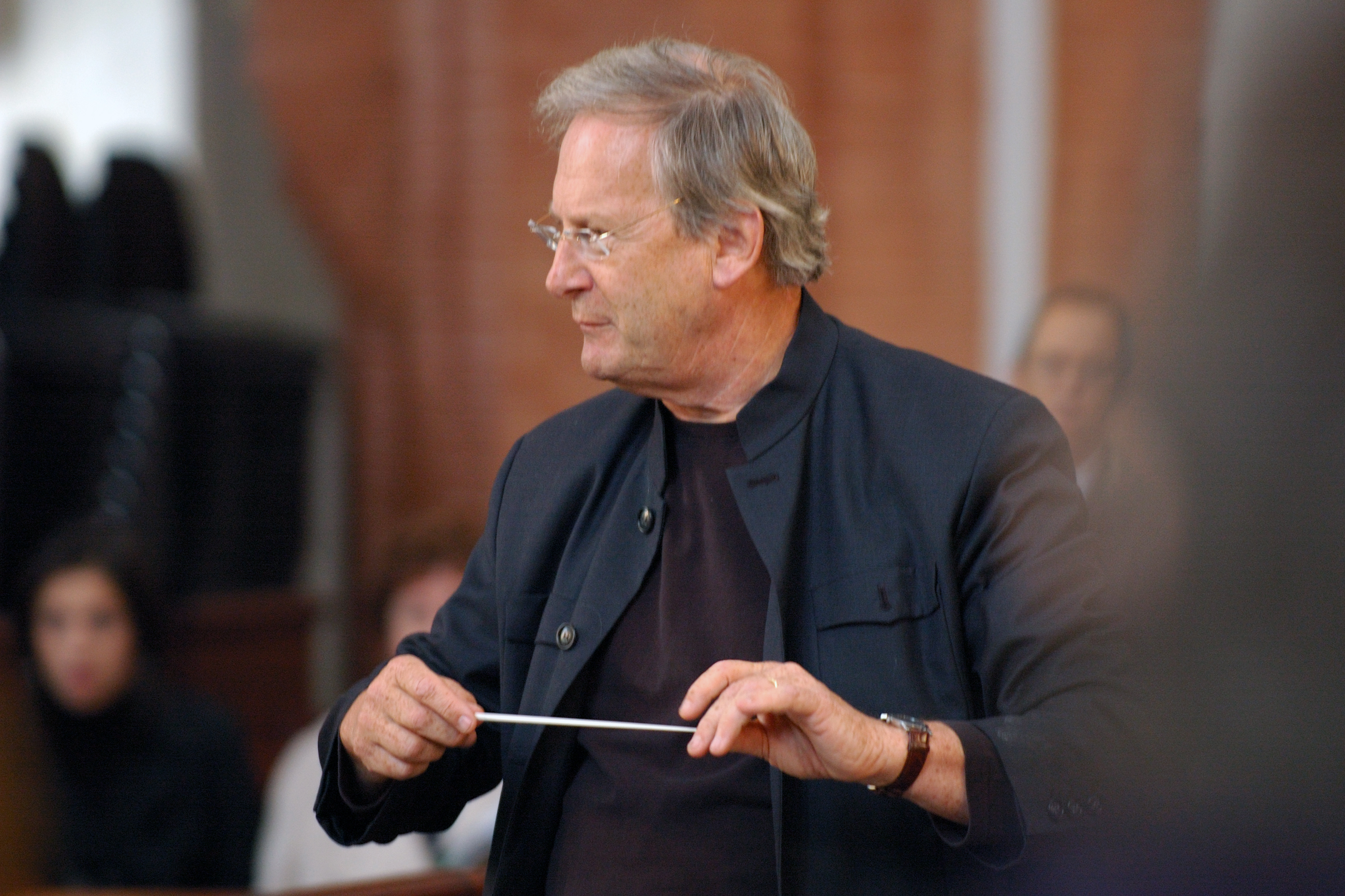
Many scholars and performers such as John Eliot Gardiner have questioned the terminology of "authentic performance"

Opinions on how artistic and academic motivations should translate into musical performance vary.

Though championing the need to attempt to understand a composer's intentions in their historical context, Ralph Kirkpatrick highlights the risk of using historical exoterism to hide technical incompetence: "too often historical authenticity can be used as a means of escape from any potentially disquieting observance of esthetic values, and from the assumption of any genuine artistic responsibility. The abdication of esthetic values and artistic responsibilities can confer a certain illusion of simplicity on what the passage of history has presented to us, bleached as white as bones on the sands of time".

Early music scholar Beverly Jerold has questioned the string technique of historically informed musicians, citing accounts of Baroque-era concert-goers describing nearly the opposite practice. Similar criticism has been leveled at the practices of historically informed vocalists.

Some proponents of the Early music revival have distanced themselves from the terminology of "authentic performance". Conductor John Eliot Gardiner has expressed the view that the term can be "misleading", and has stated, "My enthusiasm for period instruments is not antiquarian or in pursuit of a spurious and unattainable authenticity, but just simply as a refreshing alternative to the standard, monochrome qualities of the symphony orchestra."

Daniel Leech-Wilkinson concedes that much of the HIP practice is based on invention: "Historical research may provide us with instruments, and sometimes even quite detailed information on how to use them; but the gap between such evidence and a sounding performance is still so great that it can be bridged only by a large amount of musicianship and invention. Exactly how much is required can easily be forgotten, precisely because the exercise of musical invention is so automatic to the performer." Leech-Wilkinson concludes that performance styles in early music "have as much to do with current taste as with accurate reproduction." More recently, Andrew Snedden has suggested that HIP reconstructions are on firmer ground when approached in context with a cultural exegesis of the era, examining not merely how they played but why they played as they did, and what cultural meaning is embedded in the music.

In the conclusion of his study of early twentieth-century orchestral recordings, Robert Philip states that the concept of "what sounds tasteful now probably sounded tasteful in earlier periods" is a fundamental but flawed assumption behind much of the historical performance movement. Having spent the entire book examining rhythm, vibrato, and portamento, Philip states that the fallacy of the assumption of tastefulness causes adherents of historical performance to randomly select what they find acceptable and to ignore evidence of performance practice which goes against modern taste.

== Reception ==
In his book, The Aesthetics of Music, the British philosopher Roger Scruton wrote that "the effect [of HIP] has frequently been to cocoon the past in a wad of phoney scholarship, to elevate musicology over music, and to confine Bach and his contemporaries to an acoustic time-warp. The tired feeling which so many 'authentic' performances induce can be compared to the atmosphere of a modern museum.... [The works of early composers] are arranged behind the glass of authenticity, staring bleakly from the other side of an impassable screen".

A number of scholars see the HIP movement essentially as a 20th-century invention. Writing about the periodical Early Music (one of the leading periodicals about historically informed performance), Peter Hill noted "All the articles in Early Music noted in varying ways the (perhaps fatal) flaw in the 'authenticity' position. This is that the attempt to understand the past in terms of the past is—paradoxically—an absolutely contemporary phenomenon."

One of the more skeptical voices of the historically informed performance movement has been Richard Taruskin. His thesis is that the practice of unearthing supposedly historically informed practices is actually a 20th-century practice influenced by modernism and, ultimately, we can never know what music sounded like or how it was played in previous centuries. "What we had been accustomed to regard as historically authentic performances, I began to see, represented neither any determinable historical prototype nor any coherent revival of practices coeval with the repertories they addressed. Rather, they embodied a whole wish list of modern(ist) values, validated in the academy and the marketplace alike by an eclectic, opportunistic reading of historical evidence." "'Historical' performers who aim 'to get to the truth'...by using period instruments and reviving lost playing techniques actually pick and choose from history's wares. And they do so in a manner that says more about the values of the late twentieth century than about those of any earlier era."

In her book The Imaginary Museum of Musical Works: An Essay in the Philosophy of Music, Lydia Goehr discusses the aims and fallacies of both proponents and critics of the HIP movement. She claims that the HIP movement itself came about during the latter half of the 19th century as a reaction to the way modern techniques were being imposed upon music of earlier times. Thus performers were concerned with achieving an "authentic" manner of performing music—an ideal that carries implications for all those involved with music. She distills the late 20th century arguments into two points of view, achieving either fidelity to the conditions of performance, or fidelity to the musical work.

She succinctly summarizes the critics' arguments (for example, anachronistic, selectively imputing current performance ideas on early music), but then concludes that what the HIP movement has to offer is a different manner of looking at and listening to music: "It keeps our eyes open to the possibility of producing music in new ways under the regulation of new ideals. It keeps our eyes open to the inherently critical and revisable nature of our regulative concepts. Most importantly, it helps us overcome that deep‐rooted desire to hold the most dangerous of beliefs, that we have at any time got our practices absolutely right."

== See also ==
- Authenticity in art
- Concert pitch
- Early music revival
- List of early music ensembles
- One voice per part
- String section
- Shakespeare in Original Pronunciation
- Sol Babitz

== Bibliography ==
- Badura-Skoda, Paul. 1993. Interpreting Bach at the Keyboard, translated by Alfred Clayton. Oxford: Clarendon Press; New York: Oxford University Press. ISBN 0-19-816155-7 (cloth); ISBN 0-19-816576-5 (1995 pbk reprint). (Translation of Bach-Interpretation: die Klavierwerke Johann Sebastian Bachs. Laaber: Laaber-Verlag, 1990. ISBN 3-89007-141-4.)
- Dart, Thurston. 1954. The Interpretation of Music. London: Hutchinson and Co.
- Dolmetsch, Arnold. 1915. The Interpretation of the Music of the 17th and 18th Centuries Revealed by Contemporary Evidence. London: Novello.
- Donington, Robert. 1963. The Interpretation of Early Music. London: Faber and Faber.
- Hubbard, Frank. 1965. Three Centuries of Harpsichord Making. Cambridge, MA: Harvard University Press ISBN 0-674-88845-6.
- Kenyon, Nicholas (editor). 1988. Authenticity and Early Music. Oxford and New York: Oxford University Press. ISBN 0-19-816152-2.
- Kivy, Peter. 1995. Authenticities: Philosophical Reflections on Musical Performance. Ithaca: Cornell University Press. ISBN 0-8014-3046-1.
- Leech-Wilkinson, Daniel. 1992. "The Good, the Bad and the Boring". In Companion to Medieval & Renaissance Music, edited by Tess Knighton and David Fallows,. London: J. M. Dent.; New York: Schirmer Books. ISBN 0-460-04627-6 (Dent); ISBN 0-02-871221-8 (Schirmer). Paperback reprint, Oxford and New York: Oxford University Press, 1997. ISBN 0-19-816540-4. Paperback reprint, Berkeley, Calif.: University of California Press, 1997. ISBN 0-520-21081-6.
- Mattheson, Johann. 1739. Der vollkommene Kapellmeister, das ist, Gründliche Anzeige aller derjenigen Sachen, die einer wissen, können, und vollkommen inne haben muss, der eine Kapelle mit Ehren und Nutzen vorstehen will. Breslau: [s.n.]; Hamburg: Herold. Facsimile reprint, edited by Margarete Reimann. Documenta Musicologica Reihe 1: ruckschriften-Faksimiles 5. Kassel: Bärenreiter, 1954. Study edition with newly typeset text and music examples, edited by Friederike Ramm. Bärenreiter-Studienausgabe. Kassel, Basel, London, New York, Prague: Bärenreiter. ISBN 3-7618-1413-5.
- Milsom, David. 2003. Theory and Practice in Late Nineteenth-Century Violin Performance: An Examination of Style in Performance, 1850–1900. Aldershot: Ashgate. ISBN 0-7546-0756-9.
- Milsom, David. 2011. Classical and Romantic Music. The library of essays on music performance practice. Aldershot: Ashgate. ISBN 0-7546-2859-0.
- Parrott, Andrew. 2000. The Essential Bach Choir. [N.p.]: The Boydell Press. ISBN 0-85115-786-6.
- Peres da Costa, Neal. 2013. Off the Record: Performing Practices in Romantic Piano Playing. New York: OUP. ISBN 0-19-538691-4.
- Robert Philip, 1992 Early Recordings and Musical Style: Changing tastes in instrumental Performance, 1900-1950. Cambridge, UK: Cambridge University Press. ISBN 978-0-521-23528-0
- Rosen, Charles. 1997. The Classical Style, second edition. New York: W. W. Norton. ISBN 0-393-31712-9.
- Rosen, Charles. 2000. Critical Entertainments. Cambridge: Harvard University Press. ISBN 0-674-00684-4.
