= Pascal Bertin =

French countertenor (born 1965)

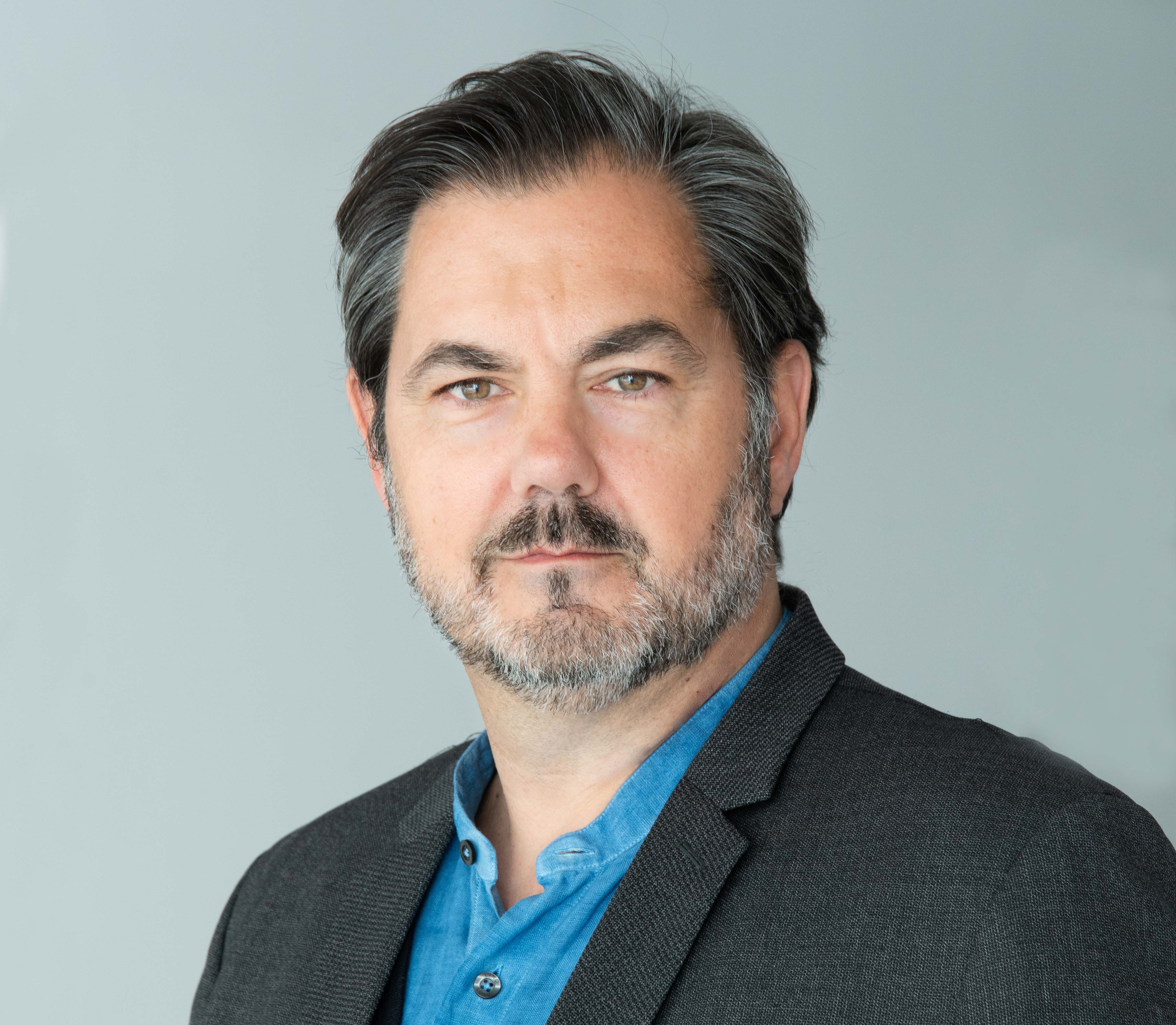
Pascal Bertin portrait

Pascal Bertin (born 1965) is a French countertenor.

Pascal Bertin began his singing career at the age of 11 years old with the Chœur d'Enfants de Paris, under the direction of Roger de Magnee, with whom he performed as a soloist around the world working with conductors such as Seiji Ozawa, Zubin Mehta and Sir Georg Solti. In 1988 he received, as a student of William Christie the first prize for interpretation of Baroque music from the Conservatoire National Supérieur de Musique de Paris.

As an interpreter of opera and oratorio, Pascal Bertin has performed with conductors and orchestras such as Jordi Savall, Christophe Rousset, Philippe Herreweghe, Marc Minkowski, Emmanuelle Haim, Masaki Suzuki, John Eliot Gardiner, Sigiswald Kuijken, Gustav Leonhardt, Ton Koopman, William Christie, Jean Tubery, Joël Suhubiette, Benoît Haller, Jean-Marc Aymes, Stephan MacLeod, Francoise Lasserre, Gilbert Bezina, Konrad Junghanel, Michel Corboz, Thomas Engelbrock, Paul Dombrecht, Eduardo Lopez Banzo, Marcel Ponseele, Herve Niquet, Pierre Cao, Reinhard Goebel, Concerto Koln, Ricercar consort, Freiburger barock orchester, Academy of ancient music.

He also enjoys an extensive career singing with various leading ensembles performing music of the middle-ages and the renaissance. Among these ensembles are the Huelgas Ensemble, Mala Punica, Daedalus, Doulce Memoire, Clément Janequin, A Sei Voci, Gilles Binchois.

On the opera stage, he has performed in Geneva, Antwerp, Salzburg, Chicago, Tokyo, Lille, New-York Strasbourg, Paris, Nice, Amsterdam, Marseille, Bologna, Lausanne, Luxemburg, Nancy, Dijon...

Pascal Bertin has recorded over 100 CDs from different periods and styles. Among them, 3 with the vocal jazz-ensemble Indigo he founded in 1987.

He is the head of the Early Music Department at the Conservatoire National Superieur de Musique et de Danse de Paris and voice teacher at the Royal Conservatoire of The Hague.

== Selected discography ==
Jordi SAVALL :

Carlos V, La cancion del Emperador 

Isabel I, Reina de Castilla Requiem, BIBER Homenatge al misteri d’Elx Missa Bruxellensis, BIBER Le Royaume oublié, la tragédie cathare Dinastia Borgia Jeanne d’Arc, Batailles et prisons Erasmus, Eloge de la folie Messe en Si mineur BWV 232, BACH HuELGAS ENSEmBLE (Paul VAN NEVEL) :

Le Printans (1603) CAUDE LE JEUNE 

La Pellegrina AGRICOLA A Secret Labyrinth

LASSUS Il Canzoniere 

Lamentations MASSAINO, WHITE, DE ORTO, LASSUS LA FENICE (Jean TuBERy) and Akadêmia (Françoise Lasserre) : Vespro per le salute MONTEVERDI Selva Morale e Spirituale MONTEVERDI Vespro della beata vergine CAVALLI Messe en la mémoire d’un prince CHARPENTIER L’héritage de Monteverdi Requiem, Magnificat, Te Deum TABART DAEDALuS (Roberto FESTA) : Delizie Napolitane Oracula LASSUS Saturn and Polyphony e two souls of Solomon ROSSI Musa Latina L’Ensemble WILLIAm ByRD (Graham O’REILLy):

Polish Baroque PEKIEL 

Miserere ALLEGRI, SCARLATTI, LEO Stabat Mater SCARLATTI Secret Garden TALLIS FONS muSICAE (ZANETTI, BERTIN, ImAmuRA, BALLESTRACCI):

Airs de cour LAMBERT
Sonate e Cantate GASPARINI 

Cantatas, duets and sonatas STEFFANI Luci Barbare BONONCINI Cantate e sonate CALDARA Suzuki : Cantates vol 27 et 29 BACH Herreweghe : Missa viri galilaei PALESTRINA Macleod : German Baroque Cantatas vol 1 et 2 TELEMANN, BUxTEHUDE, BACH Maillet : Arie e Lagrime HANDEL, Récital Bertin Memelsdorff : Helas Avril DA PERUGIA Motets CICCONIA Pluhar : Vespro della beata vergine MONTEVERDI Ensemble Janequin : Messe l’homme armé DE LA RUE La Barca BANCHIERI Sempe : La Pellegrina Gardiner : War Requiem BRITTEN Requiem FAURE Chansons RAVEL, DEBUSSY, POULENC Lopez Banzo : Ay Amor Zarzuelas DE LITERES Peral : Cantate sur l’Europe LECOT Marco : Maitres de chapelle de Paris au xVIIe CHARPENTIER, DU MONT Junghänel : Vespro della beata vergine ROSENMULLER Missa Alleluja BIBER Vespro della beata vergine MONTEVERDI Cuiller : Leçons de ténèbres RICHTER, A sei Voci : Sacrae Symphoniae GABRIELI Laplenie : Messe du manuscrit de Savoie LEJEUNE Suhubiette : Motetti BASSANO, Méditerranée Sacrée MOULTAKA Haller : Passio secundum Johannem BACH Cao : Vepres à Vienne FUx, SANCES, GLETLE, ZÄCHER

OPERAS / CD Ou DVD : Christie : Il Sant’Alessio LANDI Haïm : L’Orfeo MONTEVERDI

Garrido : Le Balet comique de la Reyne BEAUJOYEULx

Gester : La conversione di Clodoveo CALDARA Minkowski : Mitridate, Re di Ponto MOZART Alcyone MARAIS Amadigi HANDEL Giulio Cesare HANDEL Rousset : Riccardo Primo HANDEL

JAZZ, CHANSON :

INDIGO Live at Still 88
INDIGO Quintet à voix

INDIGO Furioso

INCLASSABLES :

LES 3 CONTRE-TENORS. Récital parodique de Scholl, Visse, Bertin

UNE FETE BAROQUE (10 ans du Concert d’Astrée, Haïm) Pascal Bertin arranged and sang a duet with P.Jaroussky a "salsa" version of the Purcell's "Sound the trumpet"

Marc-Antoine Charpentier

Messe pour les trépassés H 2, Motet pour les trépassés H 311, Miserere des Jésuites H 193 - 193 a, Pie Jesu H 234, Caroline Pelon, Pascal Bertin, Hans-Jörg, Jean-Claude Saragosse, Choeur de Chambre de Namur, Ensemble La Fenice, conducted by Jean Tibéry. 

CD Virgin classics 1999.
