= Josetxu Obregón =

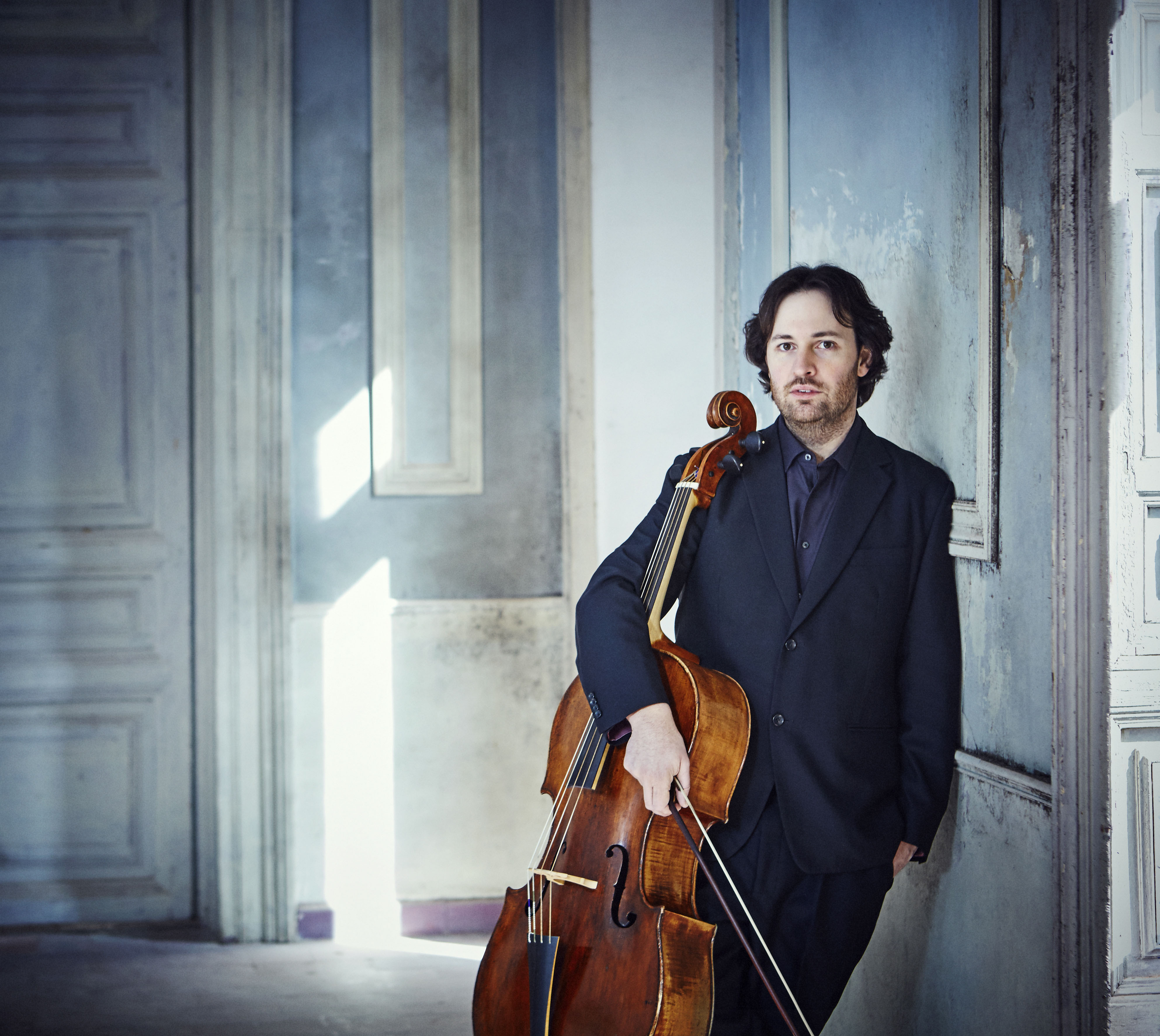
- Author: Michal Novak. CD “The Cello in Spain. Boccherini and other 18th century virtuosi”. Josetxu Obregón. La Ritirata. Glossa GCD 923103 (2015)

Background information
- Born: Bilbao, Spain
- Genres: Baroque
- Instrument: Cello
- Website: www.josetxuobregon.com

Josetxu Obregón is a Spanish cellist, specializing in early music performance.

== Biography ==
After developing a career as a modern cellist, having been appointed teacher of Madrid Royal Conservatory and cellist of the Royal Concertgebouw Orchestra in Amsterdam, Josetxu Obregón oriented his life towards the early performance field. Born in Bilbao, he has been awarded with eleven prizes at international competitions, and coursed Bachelor and Master Studies in Spain, Germany and Netherlands. He specialised in Baroque cello interpretation with Lucia Swarts in the Royal Conservatory of The Hague, having also a constant contact with Anner Bijlsma, who taught him weekly. He received also lessons from Jaap ter Linden, Balazs Mate, Marc Vanscheewijck, Eric Hoeprich, Judy Tarling, Bart van Oort, Frank de Bruine, etc.

== Orchestras ==
Selected this season as principal cellist of the European Union Baroque Orchestra, he has played under Lars Ulrich Mortensen (Concerto Copenhagen), Cristina Pluhar (L'Arpeggiata) and Maggie Faultless with great success, also appearing as soloist of Vivaldi concerto for 2 cellos in concerts in 13 countries. He performs with ensembles as Orchestra of the Age of Enlightenment (UK), Arte dei Suonatori (PL), Rotterdams Baroque Ensemble, Esterhazy Trio, Aldiviva and Bach Ensemble. He is the Artistic Leader of the ensemble La Ritirata. As a soloist he performed both Haydn Cello Concertos and several Boccherini Cello Concertos with orchestras in Spain, Portugal and Netherlands. He was also invited to play Boccherini cello sonatas as soloist with Forma Antiqva.

== Recordings ==
- “Boccherini. Sonatas”. La Ritirata. Josetxu Obregón. Verso VRS 2065 (2008)
- “Prokofiev. Cassadó. Webern”. Josetxu Obregón, cello. Ignacio Prego, piano. Verso VRS 2073 (2009)
- “Chiaroscuro”. La Ritirata. Tamar Lalo, Enrike Solinís, Josetxu Obregón. Arsis 4229 (2009)
- “Luigi Boccherini. Trios Op. 34, Vol. 1”. La Ritirata. Hiro Kurosaki, Lina Tur Bonet, Josetxu Obregón. Columna Música 1CM0258 (2010)
- “Luigi Boccherini. Trios Op. 34, Vol. 2”. La Ritirata. Hiro Kurosaki, Lina Tur Bonet, Josetxu Obregón. Columna Música 1CM0275 (2011)
- “Concierto barroco”. La Ritirata. Josetxu Obregón. DVD Cantus CV 1210 (2012)
- “Andrea Falconieri. Il Spiritillo Brando. Dance music in the courts of Italy and Spain, c.1650”. La Ritirata - Josetxu Obregón. Glossa GCD 923101 (2013)
- “Juan Crisóstomo de Arriaga (1806-1826). The complete string quartets on period instruments”. La Ritirata. Hiro Kurosaki, Miren Zeberio, Daniel Lorenzo, Josetxu Obregón. Glossa GCD 923102 (2014)
- “The Cello in Spain. Boccherini and other 18th century virtuosi”. Josetxu Obregón. La Ritirata. Glossa GCD 923103 (2015)

He made a CD recording of Beethoven’s triple concerto with Mariana Todorova and Ignacio Prego (Piccolo PC210), having also recorded "Francesco Cavalli. L’Amore Innamorato" and "Via Crucis" L'Arpeggiata – Christina Pluhar (Virgin Classics 50999 694577 0 8), "Jean-Philippe Rameau. L'Orchestre de Louis XV. Suites d'Orchestre" Le Concert des Nations – Jordi Savall (Alia Vox AVSA9882A+B), "Baroque Suites" as principal cellist of the EUBO European Union Baroque Orchestra – Lars Ulrik Mortensen (The Gift of Music (record label) CCL CDG1211), "Salve Regina" Harmonia del Parnàs (Tempus TMP1001), "Oreste Camarca. Monográfico de la obra de cámara" (Banco de Sonido BS061), etc.

He was personally invited by Anner Bijlsma to perform in a Dutch documentary film on Luigi Boccherini and Anner Bijlsma, filmed in Arenas de San Pedro, Spain, where the composer lived the last years of his life.

He made recordings for BBC Three (United Kingdom), NPO 3FM (Netherlands), Norddeutscher Rundfunk, Deutschlandradio Kultur, Südwestrundfunk (Germany), ORF (broadcaster) (Austria), NRK (Norway), Mezzo TV, Arte (France), RTVE, La 2 (Spain), RNE, RNE Radio Clásica, RNE Radio 5, Antena 3 (Spain), Cuatro (TV channel), Canal Sur, EITB, Canal 4 Castilla y León, Catalunya Música, Radio Euskadi, Radio Vitoria (Spain), Macedonian Radio Television (Republic of Macedonia), Radio HJUT Jorge Tadeo Lozano University (Colombia), Radio USACH (Chile), CRI Online (China), etc.

== Tours ==
He has played in important Early Music Festivals as Fringe Festival Oudemuziek Utrecht (Netherlands), Sevicq Brežice (Slovenia), Quedlinburger Musiksommer, Bachwochen Wiesbaden and Konzertring Coesfeld (Germany), Varaždinske barokne večeri and Festival komorne glazbe Rijeka (Croatia), Ohrid Summer Festival (North Macedonia), Saison de musique sur instruments anciens Strasbourg (France), Fondazione Academia Montis Regalis Mondovì (Italy), Kipria International Festival (Cyprus), York Early Music Festival and Music at Oxford (UK), Festival International Echternach (Luxembourg), etc. He made his debut in America with a United States tour playing in New York City, Hartford, etc. Next appointments include Mexico and Japan.

== Instruments ==
Josetxu Obregon plays an original Sebastian Klotz cello from 1740 recently restored by Johannes Loescher (Cologne) and historical bows of different periods from Kees van Hemert (The Hague) and Andreas Grutter (Amsterdam).
