= Pierre Menault =

French Baroque composer

Pierre-Richard Menault (1642–1694) was a French Baroque composer.

Menault was born at Beaune. While a provincial chapel master and priest at Dijon, he printed vespers dedicated to Père François de la Chaise, confessor of Louis XIV. He died at Dijon.

== Works, editions and recordings ==
- Masses 1676, 1686, 1687, 1691, 1692.
- Vêpres pour le Pére la Chaize. recording Greuillet, Jaroussky, Janssens, Lombard, van Dyck. Ensemble La Fenice, Jean Tubéry. K617
