= Nuria Rial =

Spanish soprano (born 1975)

Núria Rial
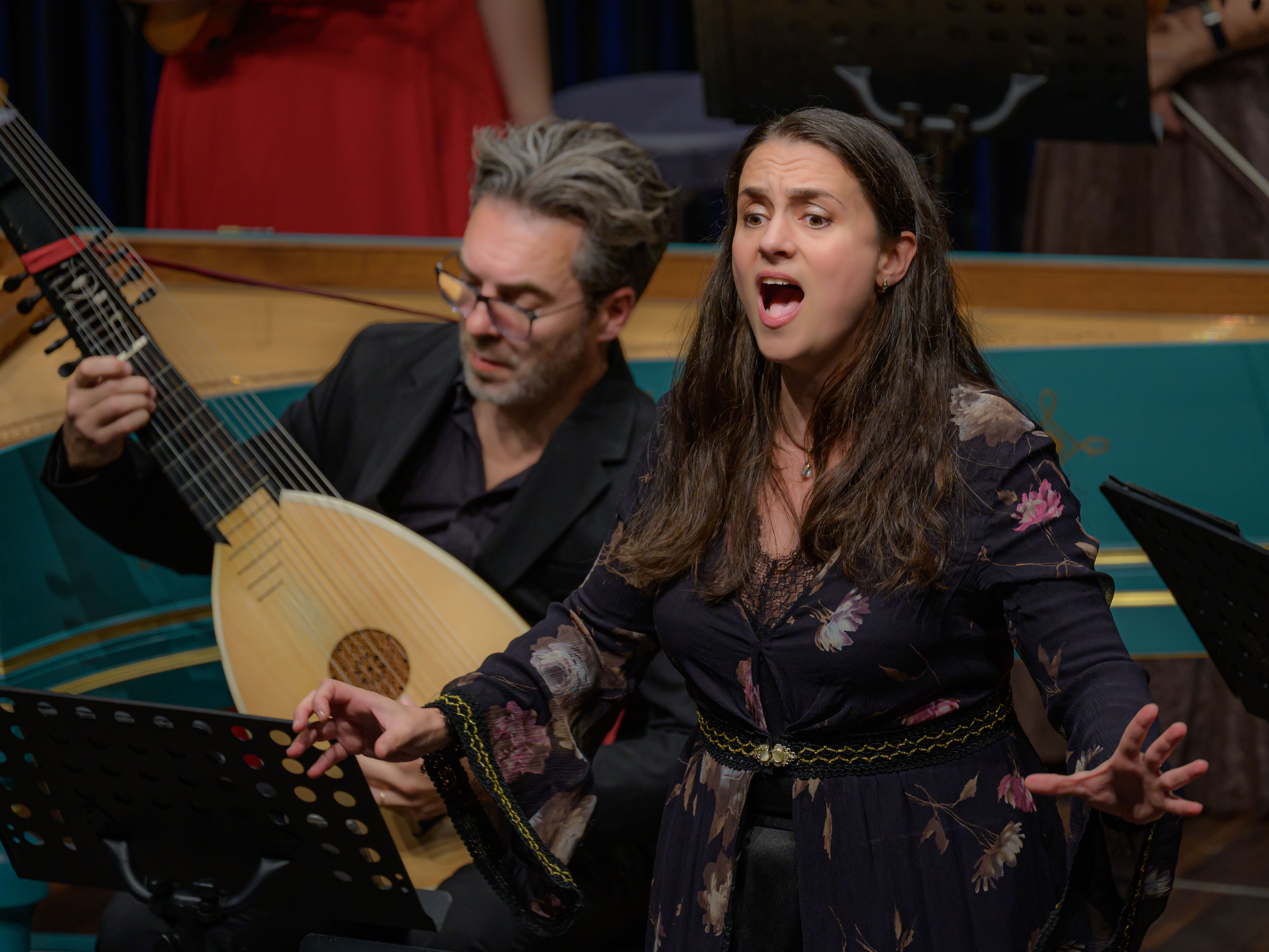
- Born: Núria Rial (Catalan); 1975 (age 50–51); Manresa, Catalonia
- Occupation: Operatic soprano
- Years active: 1997–present
- Website: www.nuriarial.com

Núria Rial (born 1975 in Manresa, Catalonia) is a Spanish soprano. In recent years, Rial has specialized in the music of the renaissance and baroque eras, such as the works of Handel and Monteverdi. Her repertoire also includes Johann Sebastian Bach, Mozart opera roles, and German, French, Catalan and Castilian art songs.

== Education ==
She began her musical studies in 1995 at the Barcelona Conservatory, finishing with a diploma in both voice and piano. From 1998 to 2002, she was a member of the Konzertklasse of Kurt Widmer at the Music Academy of Basel, where she received a diploma as a soloist.

== Discography ==
=== Awards ===
In 2009, Rial won the ECHO Klassik Award, Germany's major classical award, in the category Young Female Artist of the Year. In 2012 she won the award for the Opera Recording of the Year, arias by Georg Philipp Telemann accompanied by the Kammerorchester Basel. In 2021 she received the Traetta Prize (Italian: Premio Traetta), an award assigned by the Traetta Society in recognition of achievements in the rediscovery of the roots of European music.

=== Recordings ===
- Francisco Guerrero: Motecta. Musica Ficta. Cantus (1997)
- Miguel de Fuenllana: Orphenica Lyra 1554 (1999)
- The Spanish Album (compilation 2 CD 1999, 2000) Glossa
- Claros y Frescos Ríos – Songs and Instrumentals from the Spanish Renaissance (2000)
- Memorial Duke Ellington: Live concert (2001)
- Francesco Corselli: El Concierto Español (2002)
- George Frideric Handel: Lotario (2004)
- Orphénica Lyra: Música en el Quijote (2004)
- Emilio de' Cavalieri: Rappresentatione di Anima, et di Corpo (2004)
- Bach/Handel (2005)
- Giovanni Battista Pergolesi: Stabat Mater (2005)
- Wolfgang Amadeus Mozart: Le nozze di Figaro (2006)
- Luigi Rossi: Oratorio per la Settimana Santa. Cantalupi (2006)
- Roberto Cacciapaglia: Quarto tiempo. (2007)
- George Frideric Handel: Riccardo Primo (2007)
- Elemér Balázs Group and Núria Rial: Early Music (2007)
- George Frideric Handel: Duetti Amorosi (2008)
- Ave Maria, various composers, with Bell Arte Salzburg, Annegret Siedel (2008)
- Claudio Monteverdi: Teatro d'Amore (2008) with Philippe Jaroussky, Ensemble L'Arpeggiata and Christina Pluhar
- George Frideric Handel: Aminta e Fillide - Le Cantate Italiane di Handel, La Risonanza, GLOSSA (2008)
- Joseph Haydn: Arie per un'Amante (2009)
- George Frideric Handel: Süße Stille, sanfte Quelle (2009)
- Via Crucis: Works of Claudio Monteverdi, Tarquinio Merula, Biber (2010) with Ensemble L'Arpeggiata and Christina Pluhar
- Monteverdi Vespers
- George Frideric Handel: Athalia (2010)
- George Frideric Handel: Judas Maccabaeus (2010)
- Joaquín Rodrigo: La Obra Vocal – Antoni Ros Marbá, director (6CD 2010)
- Georg Philipp Telemann: Opera arias DHM (2011)
- Marianna Martines: cantatas "Il Primo Amore" DHM (2011)
- Bach Arias, Kammerorchester Basel, Julia Schröder DHM (2013)
- Sospiri d'amanti, Hasse, Fux, Gasparini etc., Artemandoline DHM (2014)
- Baroque Twitter, Leonardo Vinci, Gasparini, Vivaldi, etc., - With Maurice Steger, DHM (2017)
