= Daniel Wilkinson =

Daniel Wilkinson may refer to:

- Dan Wilkinson (born 1973), professional player of American football
- Daniel Wilkinson (murderer) (1845–1885), last person to be executed by Maine

== See also ==
- Daniel Leech-Wilkinson, musicologist
