= L'Arpeggiata =

European early music group

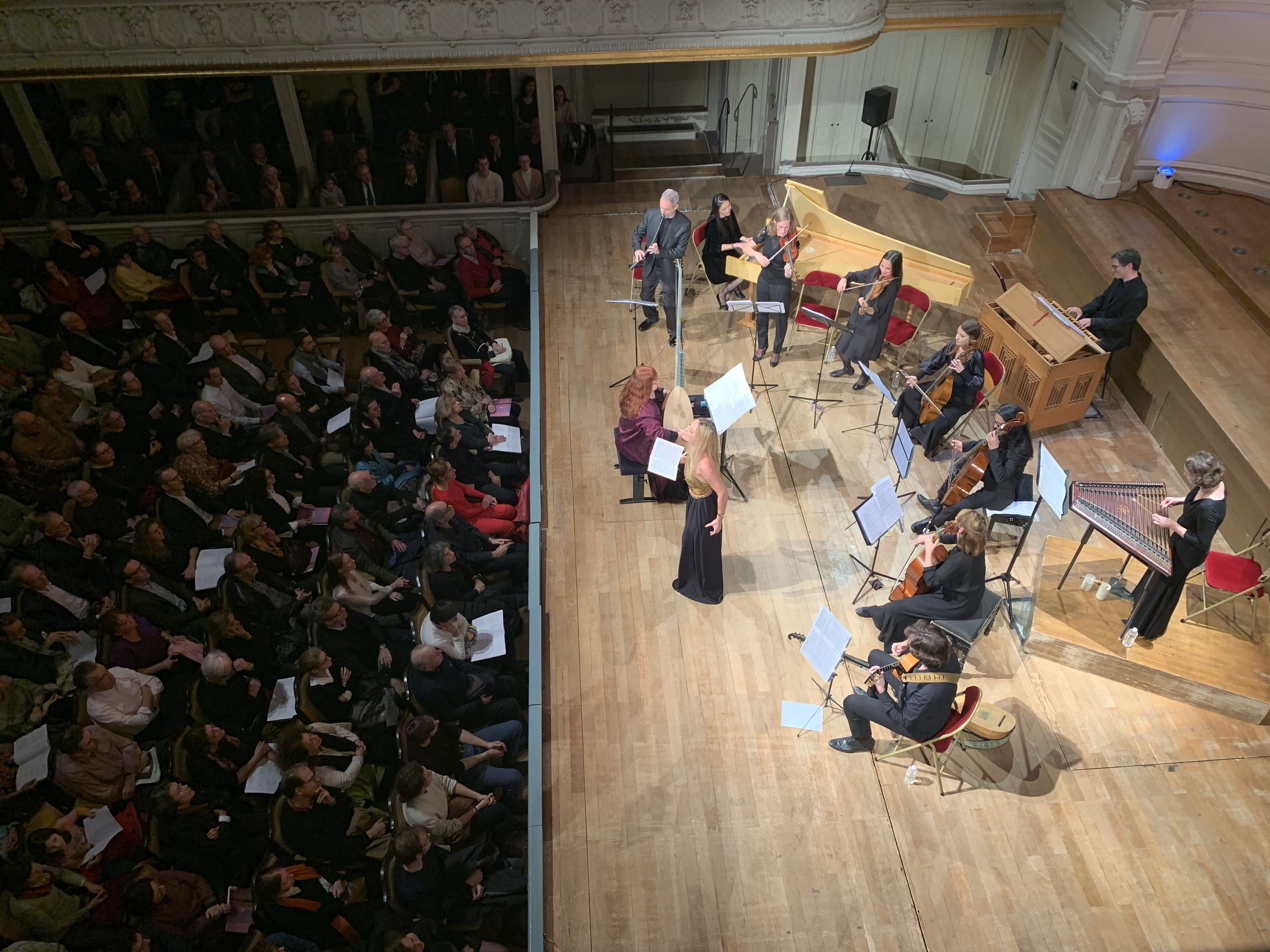
L'Arpeggiata in a concert in Paris - 12 November 2019

L'Arpeggiata is a European early music group led by Christina Pluhar, and founded by her in 2000. The group has presented both traditional early music and also several collaged and themed performances and recordings.

The group focuses on Italian, French and English music from the 17th century. In their music, they often use instrumental improvisations, in which they work together not only with baroque musicians, but also with jazz musicians.

Regular members of the group are:

- Christina Pluhar, theorbo
- Doron David Sherwin, cornetto
- Veronika Skuplik, baroque violin
- David Mayoral, percussion
- Marcello Vitale, baroque guitar
- Boris Schmidt, double bass
- Eero Palviainen, archlute and baroque guitar
- Sarah Louise Ridy, baroque harp
- Margit Übellacker, psalterium
- Haru Kitamikado, harpsichord and organ
- Mira Glodeanu, baroque violin
- Rodney Prada, viola da gamba
- Josetxu Obregón, baroque cello

== Discography ==
- Kapsberger: La Villanella Johannette Zomer, Pino de Vittorio, Hans Jörg Mammel. Alpha Records (2001)
- Stefano Landi: Homo fugi velut umbra... Alpha (2002)
- La Tarantella: Antidotum Tarantulae - with Lucilla Galeazzi and Marco Beasley. Alpha (2002)
- All'Improvviso - Ciaccone, Bergamasche e un po'di folie... Marco Beasley, Lucilla Galeazzi. Alpha (2004)
- Cavalieri: Rappresentatione di Anima, et di Corpo Alpha (2004)
- Los Impossibles. with Pepe Habichuela. Naïve Records
- Monteverdi - Teatro d'Amore Virgin Classics (2009)
- Via Crucis. Nuria Rial, Philippe Jaroussky, Barbara Furtuna Corsican male voice quartet. Virgin Classics (2010)
- Monteverdi: Vespro della Beata Vergine 2CD Virgin Classics (2011)
- Los Pájaros perdidos - The South American Project Philippe Jaroussky Virgin Classics (2012)
- Mediterraneo - Mísia fado singer, Nuria Rial, Raquel Andueza, Vincenzo Capezzuto, Katerina Papadopoulou. Virgin (2013)
- Music for a While: Improvisations on Henry Purcell. Philippe Jaroussky, Raquel Andueza, Vincenzo Capezzuto, Dominique Visse. Erato Records (2014)
- Francesco Cavalli: L'Amore Innamorato. Nuria Rial and Hana Blažíková. Erato Records (2015)
- Händel Goes Wild: Improvisations on G.F. Handel. Valer Sabadus, Nuria Rial. Erato Records (2017)
- Himmelsmusik, Christina Pluhar & L'Arpeggiata, Philippe Jaroussky, Céline Scheen, Erato, (2018)
- Luigi Rossi: La Lyra d’Orfeo - Arpa Davidica, Christina Pluhar & L'Arpeggiata, with Véronique Gens, Philippe Jaroussky, Jakub Józef Orliński, Céline Scheen, Giuseppina Bridelli, Valer Sabadus, Erato, (2019)
- Alla Napoletana, Christina Pluhar & L'Arpeggiata, Céline Scheen, Bruno de Sá, Valer Sabadus, Luciana Mancini, Vincenzo Capezzuto, Alessandro Giangrande, Zachary Wilder, João Fernandes, Erato, (2021)
- Wonder Women, Christina Pluhar & L'Arpeggiata, Céline Scheen, Luciana Mancini, Vincenzo Capezzuto, Benedetta Mazzucato, Erato, (2023)
- Terra Mater, Christina Pluhar & L'Arpeggiata, Malena Ernman, Erato, (2025)
- Orfeo son io, Christina Pluhar & L'Arpeggiata, Rolando Villazón, Deutsche Grammophon, (2025)
- La Torre del Oro, Christina Pluhar & L'Arpeggiata, Erato, (2026)
