= Henry II of Reuss-Gera =

Lord of Gera, Lobenstein and Oberkranichfeld (1572–1635)

Henry II, Count of Reuss-Gera
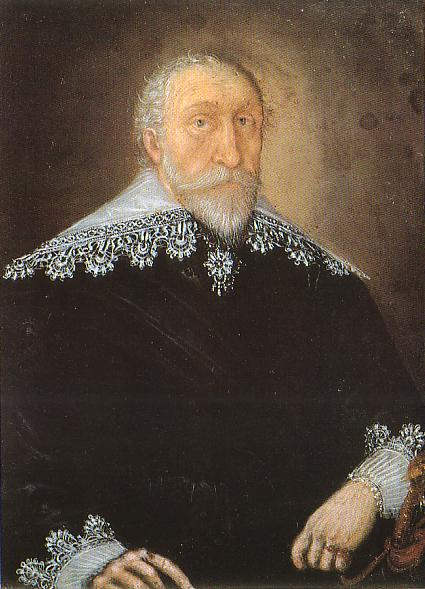
- Henry II Reuß, Count of Gera
- Born: 10 June 1572; Gera
- Died: 23 December 1635 (aged 63); Gera
- Buried: Salvator Church in Gera
- Noble family: Reuss Gera
- Spouses: Magdalena of Hohenlohe-Neuenstein; Magdalena of Schwarzburg-Rudolstadt
- Father: Henry XVI of Reuss-Gera
- Mother: Dorothea of Solms-Sonnewalde

Henry II of Reuss (younger line) (10 June 1572 – 23 December [O.S. 13 December] 1635), nicknamed the Posthumous because his father died two months before he was born, was Lord of Gera, Lord of Lobenstein and Lord of Oberkranichfeld.

== Life ==
Henry II was born posthumously, as the only son of Henry XVI of Reuss-Gera (1530–1572), the founder of the Younger Line, and Countess Dorothea of Solms-Sonnewalde (1547–1595), daughter of Frederick Magnus I, Count of Solms-Laubach.

Henry successfully promoted education and the economy of his country. In 1608, he founded the Rutheneum Gymnasium in Gera (now the Goethe-Gymnasium/Rutheneum). Against the advice of his theological councillor, he granted asylum to Calvinist refugees from Flanders and housed them in his capital city Gera. This led to an upsurge in wool production and an economic boom. During his reign, Gera also developed into the cultural centre of the Reuss areas. He had a particular fondness for "ring riding", and was a frequent guest at the courts in Vienna and Dresden.

Henry II died on 23 December 1635 and was buried in the Salvator Church in Gera. The composer Heinrich Schütz wrote his Musikalische Exequien for this occasion. His elaborately decorated copper outer coffin, with biblical proverbs and evangelical chorals, was transferred from the Salvator Church to the St. John church in 1995. In 2011, it was displayed in an exhibition about funeral practices in the early modern age in the city museum of Gera. It has also been on display in the Museum for Sepulchral Culture in Kassel.

== Marriages and issue ==
In Weikersheim on 7 February 1594, Henry II married firstly Magdalena (28 December 1572 – 2 April 1596), daughter of Wolfgang, Count of Hohenlohe-Neuenstein (1546-1610) and Countess Magdalena, Gräfin of Nassau-Dillenburg (1547-1633). They had one daughter:

- Dorothea Magdalena (25 February 1595 – 29 October 1647), married in 1620 to Burgrave George of Kirchberg.

In Rudolstadt on 22 May 1597, Henry II married secondly Magdalena (12 Apr 1580 – 22 Apr 1652), daughter of Count Albert VII of Schwarzburg-Rudolstadt and Countess Julianne of Nassau-Dillenburg (1546-1588). They had seventeen children:

- Juliane Marie (1 February 1598 – 4 January 1650), married in 1614 to Count David of Mansfeld-Schraplau.
- Henry I (21 February 1599 – 27 July 1599)
- Agnes (17 April 1600 – 1 February 1642), married in 1627 to Count Ernest Louis of Mansfeld-Heldrungen.
- Elisabeth Magdalene (8 May 1601 – 4 April 1641).
- Henry II (14 August 1602 – 28 May 1670), Lord of Gera and Saalburg.
- Henry III (31 Oct 1603 – 12 July 1640), Lord of Schleiz.
- Henry IV (21 December 1604 – 3 November 1628).
- Henry V (3 November 1606 – 3/7 November 1606), twin with Henry VI.
- Henry VI (3 November 1606 – 3/7 November 1606), twin with Henry V.
- Sophie Hedwig (24 February 1608 – 22 January 1653).
- Dorothea Sibylle (7 October 1609 – 25 November 1631), married in 1627 to Baron Christian Schenk of Toutenburg.
- Henry VII (15 October 1610 – 24 July 1611).
- Henry VIII (19 June 1613 – 24 September 1613).
- Anna Katharina (24 March 1615 – 16 February 1682).
- Henry IX (22 May 1616 – 9 January 1666), Lord of Schleiz.
- Ernestine (19 March 1618 – 23 February 1650), married in 1639 to Otto Albert of Schönburg-Hartenstein.
- Henry X (9 September 1621 – 25 January 1671), Lord of Lobenstein and Ebersdorf.

== Honors ==
Since 2008, the motor car of one of the trams in Gera bears his name.

== Bibliography ==
- Literature by and about Henry II of Reuss-Gera in the German National Library catalogue
- Ferdinand Hahn (1880). "Heinrich der Jüngere Postumus" . Allgemeine Deutsche Biographie (in German). Vol. 11. Leipzig: Duncker & Humblot. pp. 579–583.
- Thomas Gehrlein: Das Haus Reuss. Älterer und Jüngerer Linie, brochure, 2006
- Heinrich P. Reuss and Heike Karg: Die Sterbenserinnerung des Heinrich Posthumus Reuss (1572–1635). Konzeption seines Leichenprozesses, 1997
- Hagen Enke: Dissertationis de Henrici Posthumi Rutheni vita et regno historicae commentatio. Vorbereitende Überlegungen zu einer Monographie über das Leben und die Regierungszeit des Heinrich Posthumus Reuß (1572/95–1635), in: Jahrbuch des Museums Reichenfels-Hohenleuben, issue 44, 159th annual report of the Vogtländischen Altertumsfor-schenden Vereins zu Hohenleuben e.V., Hohenleuben, 2000, p. 17–34.
- Hagen Enke: Heinrich Posthumus Reuß (1572/95–1635) und die Fruchtbringende Gesellschaft, in: Klaus Manger (ed.): Die Fruchtbringer - eine Teutschhertzige Gesellschaft, Jenaer Germanistische Forschungen, new series, vol. 10, p. 39–60
