= Pierre Verany =

French record label

Disques Pierre Verany is a French classical music record label named after its founder and producer. Verany, a producer and sound engineer, ran his own label "Disques Pierre Verany" for many years — concentrating on Italian and French baroque music - before selling the label in 1997 to the Arion (record label) of Manuela Ostrolenk, who had acquired Arion from the first owner Ariane Segal in 1985.

Artists associated with the label include Paul Kuentz, flautist Christian Mendoze, harpsichordist Laurent Stewart, singers Isabelle Poulenard, Philippe Cantor, Pierre Pincemaille, conductor Gilbert Bezzina, Françoise Lasserre and Akadêmia.
