= Philippe Jaroussky =

French countertenor (born 1978)

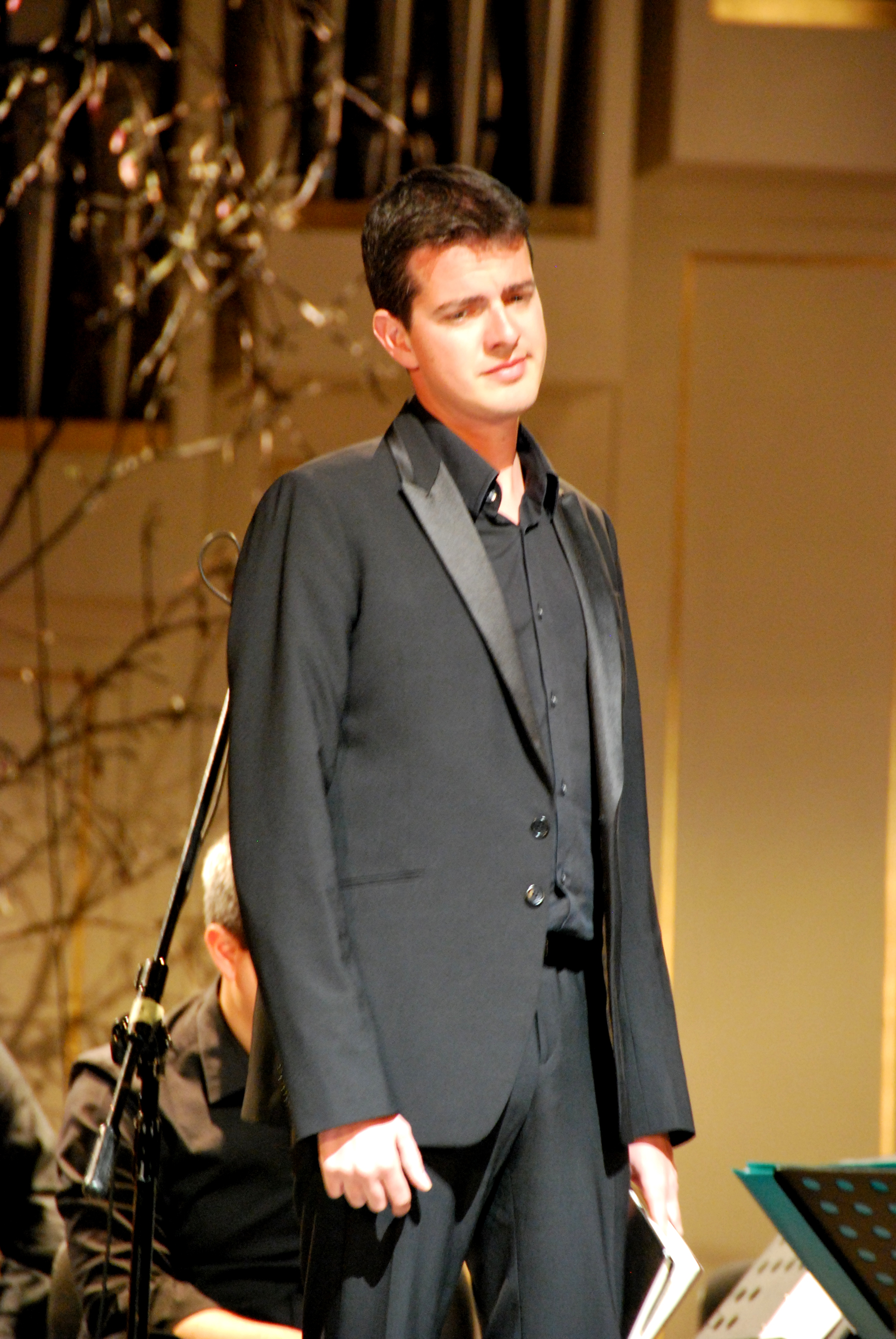
- Philippe Jaroussky, 2011 Misteria Paschalia Festival, Kraków Philharmonic
- Born: 13 February 1978 (age 48); Maisons-Laffitte, Île-de-France, France
- Occupation: Singer (countertenor)
- Years active: 1999–present
- Website: www.philippejaroussky.fr

Philippe Jaroussky (French pronunciation: [filip ʒaʁuski]; born 13 February 1978) is a French countertenor. He began his musical career with the violin, winning an award at the Versailles conservatory, and then took up the piano before turning to singing.

Jaroussky performs entirely in falsetto register. He has said that his natural singing voice is in the baritone range.

== Early career ==
Jaroussky was born in Maisons-Laffitte. His great-grandfather was a Jewish-Russian émigré who fled from the Bolshevik Revolution.

Jaroussky was inspired to sing by the Martinique-born countertenor Fabrice di Falco. He received his diploma from the Early Music Faculty of the Conservatoire de Paris. Since 1996, he has studied singing with Nicole Fallien. He cofounded the ensemble Artaserse in 2002, and has also often performed with the Ensemble Matheus under Jean-Christophe Spinosi and with L'Arpeggiata under Christina Pluhar.

On 29 July 2016 he performed David Bowie's "Always Crashing in the Same Car" in the David Bowie Prom, a tribute to the late singer as part of the Proms at the Royal Albert Hall, London.

In September 2017, as a part of the opening of La Seine Musicale, Jaroussky launched his education program, Académie musicale Philippe Jaroussky.

== Reception and awards ==
According to La Terrasse, "this young singer with the tone of an angel and the virtuosity of the devil has come into the limelight in only a few years as the great new French vocal talent." He received the Révélation Artiste lyrique in the 2004 Victoires de la musique classique and was Artiste lyrique de l'année in the 2007 and 2010 edition. Jaroussky was awarded "The Best Singer of the Year" at the Echo Klassik Awards, 2008 and 2016. He also received an ECHO Klassik Award in 2012 for the Album Duetti, which he recorded together with Max Emanuel Cenčić. In 2020, he was awarded Victoire d'honneur in the Victoires de la musique classique.

Jaroussky was named Chevalier of the Ordre des Arts et des Lettres in 2009 and was promoted to the rank of Officier in 2019.

In 2006 the asteroid 332183 Jaroussky was named after him. On 13 November 2019, which marked the twentieth anniversary since his debut, a wax figure of him sculpted by Éric Saint-Chaffray was inaugurated at the Musée Grévin with his concert, where he also received the medal of the Ordre des Arts et des Lettres.

== In culture ==
Songs performed by Jaroussky were used in the film Turkish Seat (Russian: Турецкое седло, Turetskoye sedlo) by Uzbek-Russian film director Yusup Razykov, 2017.

== Personal life ==
Relatively little is known about his personal life as stated in a 2011 interview, Jaroussky said: "I don't like to discuss my personal life. I feel in classical music, you don't have to speak about that. I have many reasons."

He is openly gay and has been in a relationship with a "very supportive" non-musician since 2007. His boyfriend sometimes travels with him.

== Discography ==
=== Charts ===
Year	Album	Credits	Peak positions	
Year	Album	Credits	BEL Wa	FRA
2004	Un Concert pour Mazarin	Philippe Jaroussky & Jean Tubéry	—	132
2005	Vivaldi: Virtuoso cantatas	Philippe Jaroussky	—	128
2006	Vivaldi: Heroes	Philippe Jaroussky & Jean Christophe Spinosi	—	26
2007	Carestini	Philippe Jaroussky	—	30
2008	Nisi Dominus / Stabat Mater – Vivaldi	Marie-Nicole Lemieux, Philippe Jaroussky, Jean-Christophe Spinosi, Ensemble Matheus	82	11
2008	Carestini – The Story of a Castrato	Philippe Jaroussky & Emmanuelle Haim	87	92
2009	Opium – Mélodies françaises	Philippe Jaroussky	—	46
2009	JC Bach – La dolce fiamma	Philippe Jaroussky	84	20
2010	Stabat Mater & Motets to Virgin Mary	Philippe Jaroussky	—	167
2010	Les stars du classique	Philippe Jaroussky	—	155
2010	Caldara in Vienna – Forgotten Castrato Arias	Philippe Jaroussky	78	36
2011	Fauré: Requiem	Philippe Jaroussky, Matthias Goerne, Paavo Järvi	—	74
2011	Duetti	Philippe Jaroussky	—	66
2012	La voix des rêves	Philippe Jaroussky	—	36
2012	La voix des rêves / The Voice	Philippe Jaroussky	90	49
2013	Farinelli: Porpora Arias	Philippe Jaroussky, Venice Baroque Orchestra, Andrea Marcon	106	10
2013	Pergolesi: Stabat Mater, Laudate Pueri & Confitebor	Philippe Jaroussky	—	74
2014	Pietà – Sacred Works for Alto	Philippe Jaroussky	—	28
2016	Bach – Telemann: Sacred Cantatas	Philippe Jaroussky & Freiburger Barockorchester	76	62
2017	La storia di Orfeo	Philippe Jaroussky	88	123
2017	Artaserse – The Händel Album	Philippe Jaroussky	83	66
2019	Ombra mai fu – Francesco Cavalli Opera Arias	Philippe Jaroussky	144	71
2019	Passion Jaroussky!	Philippe Jaroussky	—	80
2020	La Vanità Del Mondo	Philippe Jaroussky	—	
2021	À sa guitare	Philippe Jaroussky and Thibaut Garcia	200	—

=== Operas and concert works ===
- Alessandro Scarlatti: Sedecia, Re di Gerusalemme. Lesne, Pochon, Harvey, Padmore. Il Seminario Musicale, Gérard Lesne. Virgin Veritas (rec. November 1999, École Sainte-Geneviève, Versailles, France)
- Monteverdi: L'incoronazione di Poppea. Laurens, Oliver, Schofrin, Oro. Ensemble Elyma, Gabriel Garrido. K617 (rec. July/August 2000, Chiesa San Martino, Erice, Italy)
- Pierre Menault: Vêpres pour le Pére la Chaize. Greuillet, Janssens, Lombard, van Dyck. Ensemble La Fenice, Jean Tubéry. K617 (rec. April 2001, chiesa Saint-Lazare, Avallon, France)
- Giovanni Battista Bassani: La morte delusa. Galli, del Monaco, Piolino, Sarragosse. Ensemble La Fenice, Jean Tubéry. Opus 111 (rec. August 2001, Delft, Nederland)
- Antonio Vivaldi: Catone in Utica. Edwards, Laszczkowski, Cangemi, Faraon. La Grande Écurie, Jean-Claude Malgoire. Dynamic (rec. November 2001, Théâtre Municipal, Tourcoing, France)
- Vivaldi: La Verità in cimento. Rolfe-Johnson, Stutzmann, Laurens, Mingardo. Ensemble Matheus, Jean-Christophe Spinosi. Naïve – Opus 111 (rec. September 2002, Église de Daoulas, Bretagne, France)
- Handel: Agrippina. Gens, Perruche, Smith, Grégoire, di Falco. La Grande Écurie, Jean-Claude Malgoire. Dynamic (rec. March 2003, Théâtre Municipal, Tourcoing, France)
- Monteverdi: Selva morale e spirituale. Spiritualità e liturgia / I salmi vespertini / Vespro dei Martiri / L'eloquenza divina. Ensemble Elyma, Gabriel Garrido. Ambronay Edition (rec. 2003/2004, Festival d'Ambronay, France)
- Vivaldi: Orlando furioso. Larmore, Lemieux, Cangemi. Ensemble Matheus, Jean-Christophe Spinosi. Naïve – Opus 111 (rec. June 2004, Église de Daoulas, Bretagne, France)
- Monteverdi: L'Orfeo. van Rensburg, Gerstenhaber, Thébault, Gerstenhaber, Gillot, Kaïque. La Grande Écurie et la Chambre du Roy, Jean-Claude Malgoire. Dynamic (rec. October 2004, Théâtre Municipal, Tourcoing, France)
- Vivaldi: Griselda. Lemieux, Cangemi, Kermes, Ferrari, Davies. Ensemble Matheus, Jean-Christophe Spinosi. Naïve – Opus 111 (rec. November 2005, Salle Surcouf, Foyer du Marin, Brest, France)
- Bach: Magnificat – Handel: Dixit Dominus. Dessay, Deshayes, Spence, Naouri. Le Concert d'Astrée, Emmanuelle Haïm. Virgin Classics, 2007
- Vivaldi: Nisi Dominus and Stabat Mater. Jaroussky, Lemieux. Ensemble Matheus, Jean-Christophe Spinosi. Naïve (rec. July 2007, Salle Surcouf, Brest (France))
- Handel: Faramondo, in role of Adofo. Il Barocchisti under direction of Diego Fasolis. Virgin Classics, 2009 (rec. October 2008, Lugano.)
- Via Crucis – Monteverdi, Benedetto Ferrari, Heinrich Ignaz Franz von Biber, Giovanni Legrenzi, Luigi Rossi, Tarquinio Merula. Jaroussky, Núria Rial, Enzo Gragnaniello, Barbara Furtuna. Jean-Philippe Guissani, Giovanni Antonio, Pandolfi Mealli, Roccu Mambrini, Toni Casalonga, Nando Acquaviva, Lorenzo Allegri. L'Arpeggiata, Christina Pluhar. Virgin Classics, 2010
- Vivaldi: Ercole su'l Termodonte. Damrau, Genaux, Romina Basso, Ciofi, DiDonato, Villazón, Philippe Jaroussky, Topi Lehtipuu. Europa Galante, Fabio Biondi. Virgin Classics, 2011
- Fauré: Requiem. Jaroussky, Matthias Goerne. Chœur et Orchestre de Paris, Paavo Järvi. Virgin Classics, 2011
- Vinci: Artaserse. Jaroussky, Max Emanuel Cenčić, Franco Fagioli, Valer Barna-Sabadus, Yuriy Mynenko, Daniel Behle. Concerto Köln, Diego Fasolis. Virgin Classics, 2012
- Handel: Partenope, in role of Arsace. Il Pomo d'Oro, Riccardo Minasi. Erato, 2015 (rec. February 2015, Lonigo, Italy)
- Monteverdi–Sartorio–Rossi: La Storia di Orfeo. Emőke Baráth. I Barocchisti, Diego Fasolis. Warner Classics/Parlophone, 2017.
- Kaija Saariaho "Only the Sound Remains" Davóne Tines, Nora Kimball-Mentzos, Dudok Quartet Amsterdam, Eija Kankaanranta, Camilla Hoitenga, Niek KleinJan, Nederlands Kamerkoor, cond. André de Ridder, dir. Peter Sellars. Warner Classics, 2018.

=== Solo recitals ===
- Benedetto Ferrari: Musiche varie. Ensemble Artaserse. Ambroisie (rec. October/December 2002, Chapelle Jésus-Enfant – Paroisse Ste. Clothilde, Paris)
- Beata Vergine, Motets à la Vierge entre Rome et Venise, Grandi, Legrenzi, Cavalli, Antonio Rigatti, Giovanni Paolo Caprioli, Frescobaldi, Sances, Ensemble Artaserse. Virgin Classics (rec. December 2005, Église Notre-Dame du Liban, Parigi, France)
- Un concert pour Mazarin. Ensemble La Fenice, Jean Tubéry. Virgin Classics, 2004 (rec. June 2003, Abbaye de Saint-Michel, Thiérache, France)
- Antonio Vivaldi: Virtuoso cantatas. Ensemble Artaserse. Virgin Veritas (rec. October 2004, Chapelle des sœurs auxiliaires, Versailles, France)
- Vivaldi Heroes. Ensemble Matheus, Jean-Christophe Spinosi. Virgin Classics (rec. October 2006, Auditorium de l'Ecole Nationale de Musique, Brest, France)
- Carestini, the story of a castrato. Le Concert d'Astrée, Emmanuelle Haïm. Virgin Classics, 2007
- Opium – Mélodies françaises. Philippe Jaroussky, Jerôme Ducros. Virgin Classics, 2009 – songs by Debussy, Hahn, Fauré, César Franck, Massenet, Ernest Chausson, André Caplet, Saint-Saëns, Paul Dukas, Guillaume Lekeu, Cécile Chaminade, Gabriel Dupont, Vincent d'Indy
- Johann Christian Bach. La dolce fiamma. Forgotten castrato arias. Le Cercle de l'Harmonie, dir. Jérémie Rhorer, Virgin Classics 2009. – awarded the Diapason d'Or de l'Année 2010 in France
- Caldara in Vienna (Forgotten Castrato Arias). Philippe Jaroussky / Concerto Köln, Emmanuelle Haïm, Virgin Classics, 2010.
- La voix des rêves (CD), Capitol Music/EMI Music France, 2012
