= Mariana Todorova =

Bulgarian violinist (born 1974)

Mariana Todorova (born 1974) is a Bulgarian violinist, who has been the concert master of the Spanish Radiotelevision orchestra since 1997.

== Biography ==
Born in Varna (Bulgaria), Todorova began her violin studies at the age of five with S. Furnadjieva. At fourteen she won first prize in the national "S.Obretenov" competition and the international "Kocian" competition in Czechoslovakia. She also won the Varna City Cultural Award and the National Chamber Music Competition Award Zlatnata Diana in Pleven (Bulgaria).

She continued her studies at Madrid's Real Conservatorio Superior with Víctor Martín graduating in 1995 with Extraordinary Prize. The same year she won the Sarasate prize, awarded by the Loewe Foundation and performed in concert with the composer's Stradivarius.

She took part in master classes given by Mincho Minchev, Ifrah Neaman, Isabel Vilá, Lorand Fenives, Clara Flieder, Mauricio Fuks, Ruggiero Ricci, Ferenc Rados and Walter Levin.

She performed as a soloist with various European orchestras conducted by Dafov, Kolarov, Keradjiev, Izquierdo, Fournet, García Asensio, Andreescu, Leaper, Encinar, Noseda, Ros Marbá and others. Her repertoire covers the period from baroque to contemporary music, including premieres of works dedicated to her by Bustamante, Cueva, Ruiz Pipó, Greco, Torres, Taverna-Bech.

Mariana has made numerous recordings for the Spanish Television and Radio. She performs on a regular basis at the most important festivals and chamber music cycles in Spain, and is regularly invited as concertmaster by the Real Filarmonía de Galicia.

In 2000 she performed in concert the violin concerto "Ardor" by José Luis Greco, dedicated to her, with the Symphony Orchestra of Gran Canaria. She also recorded this concert in CD for the ASV label. This disc has been selected "exceptional disc of the month" by the Scherzo magazine in December 2003 and became "Editor's choice" of Gramophone Magazine in October 2003.

Mariana Todorova plays in a duo with pianist Irini Gaitani and is member of the "Modus" string trio since it was founded in 1997. The trio gave the first performance in Spain of Jean Françaix "Divertissment" for string trio and orchestra with the Orchestra of the Community of Madrid and José Ramón Encinar. She is the leader as well of the chamber music orchestra Madrid Soloists founded in the Spring of 1996, which is made up of the section leaders and players from the Spanish Radio and Television Orchestra.

She plays a Joseph Ceruti violin made in 1844.
