= Akadêmia =

French early music ensemble

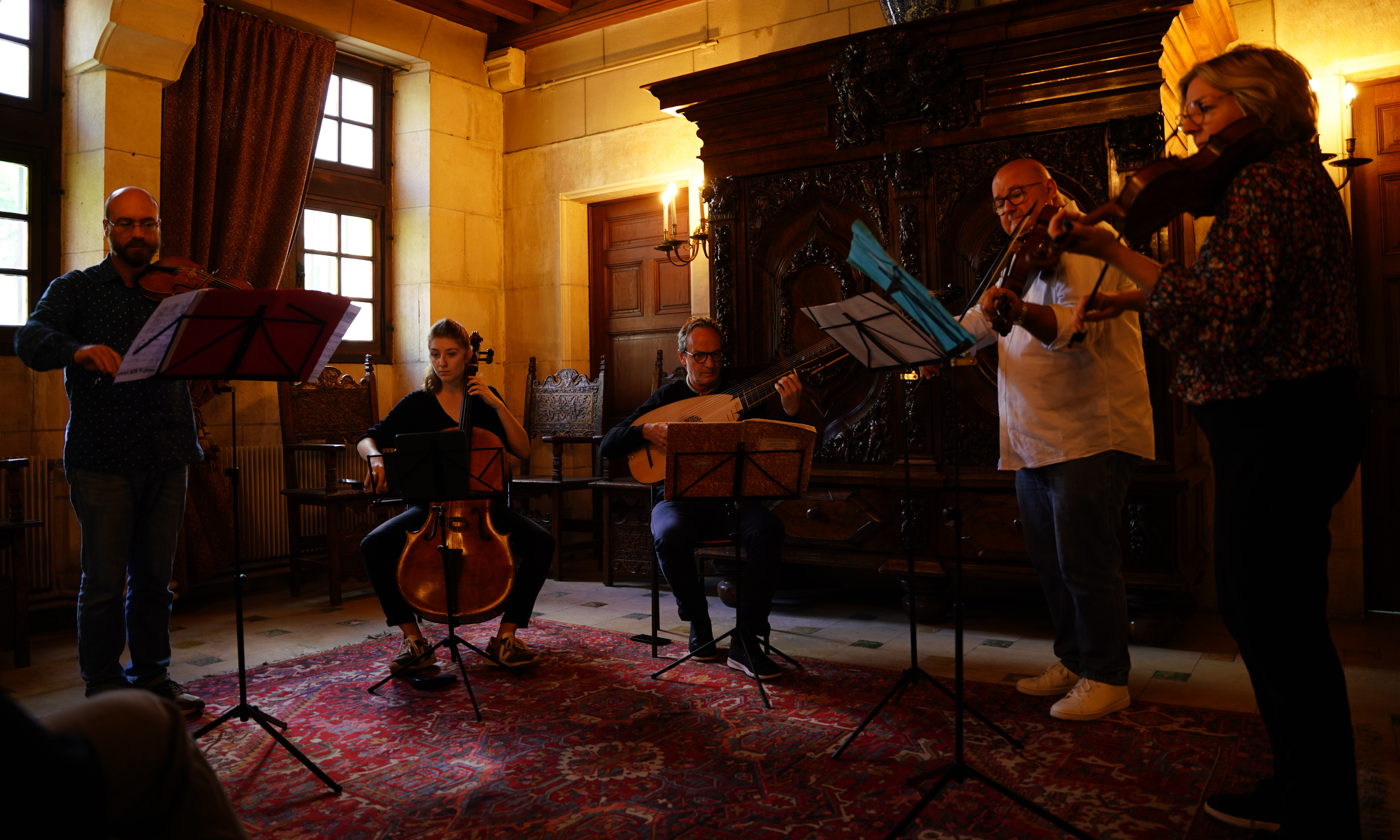
2023

Akadêmia is a French early music ensemble founded in 1986 by conductor Françoise Lasserre. The initial group of singers were formed from members of Philippe Herreweghe's Chapelle Royale.

The ensemble are frequent artists at France's major early music festivals such as the Ambronay Festival. Several of the group's recordings have been made in cooperation with La Fenice directed Jean Tubéry.

== Discography ==
- J. S. Bach: Cantatas BWV 12, 78, 150, Motet BWV 118, Zig-Zag Territoires. 2009
- J. S. Bach: Motets Pierre Verany
- Pier Francesco Cavalli: Vespro della beata Vergine
- Cavalli: Requiem
- Stefano Landi: La morte d'Orfeo
- Monteverdi: Selva morale
- Monteverdi: Vespro per la Salute 1650
- Monteverdi: Combattimento
- Heinrich Schütz: Musikalische Exequien
- Heinrich Schütz: Die Sieben Worte Jesu am Kreuz
- Heinrich Schütz: Matthew Passion
- Heinrich Schütz: Resurrection Oratorio
- Heinrich Schütz: Christmas story
- Palestrina: Bella vergine - cycle of Petrarca madrigals
- Palestrina: Canticum canticorum - cycle of 29 motets
