= Virgin Classics =

Record label, founded 1988, absorbed into Warner Classics from 2013

- Parent company: Thorn EMI (1992–1996); EMI (1996–2012); Parlophone Label Group (independent operation; 2012–2013); Warner Music Group (back catalogue; 2013–present)
- Founded: 1988; 37 years ago
- Founder: Richard Branson
- Defunct: 2013; 12 years ago
- Status: Defunct; absorbed into Erato Records
- Genre: Classical music
- Country of origin: France

Virgin Classics was a record label founded in 1988 as part of Richard Branson's Virgin Records.

The unit, along with EMI Classics, was acquired by Universal Music Group in 2012 as part of the takeover of the EMI Music Group, however the terms of the European Commission's September 2012 approval of the takeover requires divestment of the classical labels which were sold on 7 February 2013 to Warner Music Group. The European Union approved the deal in May 2013. Warner Music's Warner Classics unit absorbed the Virgin Classics artists roster and catalogue into Erato Records but lost the rights to use either the EMI or Virgin names.

== Principal artists ==
- Piotr Anderszewski
- Leif Ove Andsnes
- Nicholas Angelich
- Fabio Biondi
- Gautier Capuçon
- Renaud Capuçon
- Max Emanuel Cencic
- William Christie
- Hughes de Courson
- Alan Curtis (conductor)
- Diana Damrau
- David Daniels
- Natalie Dessay
- Joyce DiDonato
- David Fray
- Vivica Genaux
- Véronique Gens
- Emmanuelle Haïm
- Daniel Harding
- Philippe Jaroussky
- Paavo Järvi
- Truls Mørk
- Roger Norrington
- Artemis Quartet
- Quatuor Ebène
- Christina Pluhar
- Valeriy Sokolov
- Christian Tetzlaff
- Alexandre Tharaud
- Rolando Villazón (early recordings)

== See also ==
- EMI Classics
