= Daniel Leech-Wilkinson =

Daniel Leech-Wilkinson (born 21 October 1954) is a musicologist born in Bath. He is Emeritus Professor of Music at King's College London.

He studied composition, harpsichord and the organ at the Royal College of Music, and then completed an M.Mus at King's College London specialising in 15th-century music. He received his PhD from the University of Cambridge, on the topic of 14th century compositional processes.

His publications include The Modern Invention of Medieval Music: Scholarship, Ideology, Performance (Cambridge University Press, 2002, ISBN 9780521037044) and he co-edited The Cambridge Companion to Recorded Music (Cambridge University Press, 2011, ISBN 9780521684613).

In 2019 he was elected a Corresponding Member of the American Musicological Society.
