= Françoise Lasserre =

Françoise Lasserre (born 7 April 1955) is a French conductor and artistic director of the Akadêmia ensemble since 1986.

== Life ==
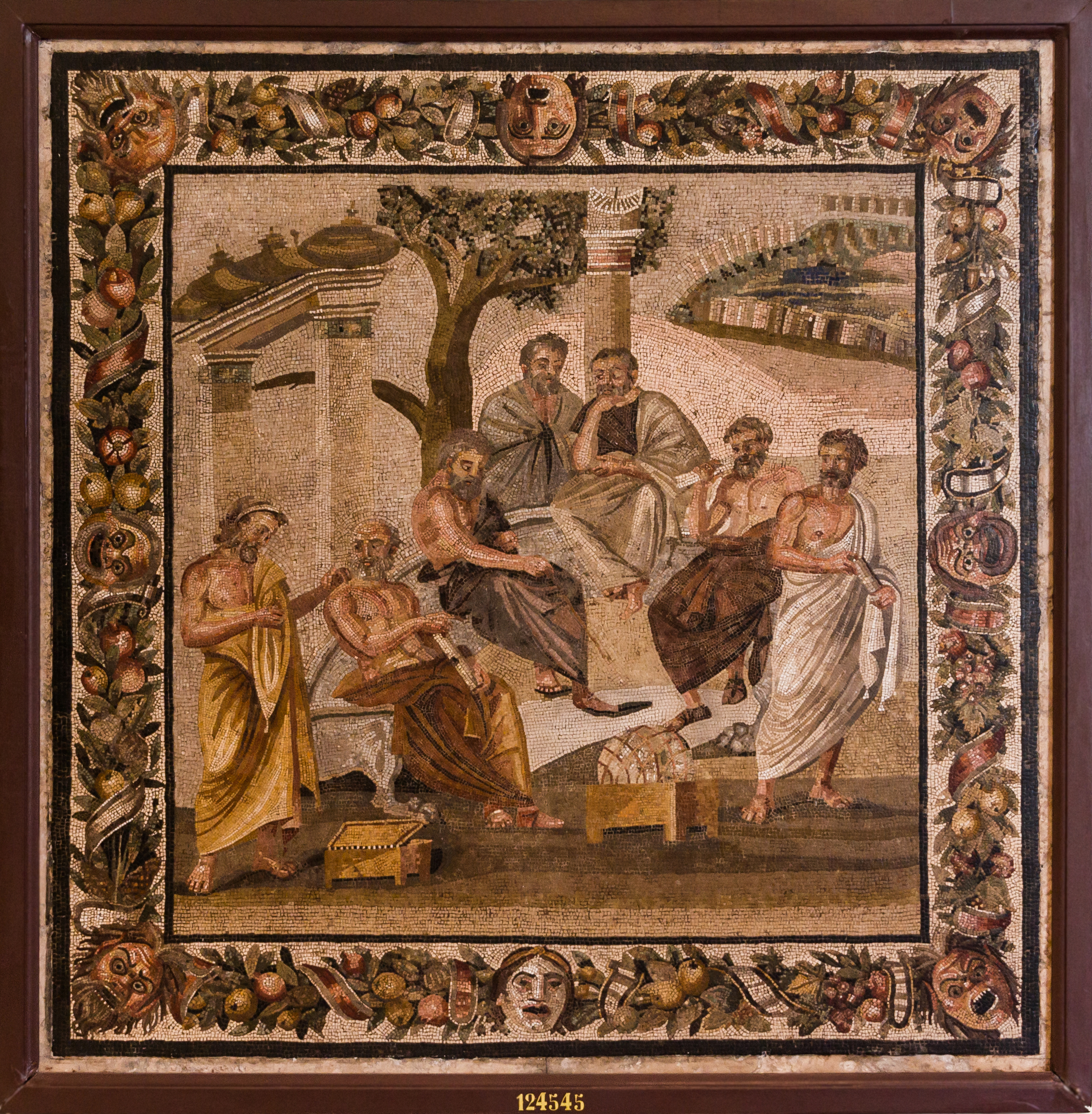
Platonic Academy (Roman mosaic found in Pompeii).

After graduating in mathematics, Lasserre completed her flute training, studying piano, choral singing, harmony, writing and conducting at the École Normale de Musique de Paris in Pierre Dervaux's class. At the beginning of the 1980s, she worked under the direction of Philippe Herreweghe within La Chapelle Royale and the Collegium Vocale Gent, then, as a chorister with Michel Corboz.

First "Ensemble vocal régional de Champagne-Ardenne", in residence in Reims, the ensemble's project was born thanks to the support of the Regional Council and Bernard Stasi, became professional ten years later changing its name to Akadêmia with the instrumentalists and in reference to the Platonic Academy and the Italian Accademia of the Renaissance. The ensemble is rewarded with the 1st prize of the Palestrina competition in 1994. She is invited to conduct other ensembles, including the Maurice Emmanuel vocal ensemble, the Festival de musique de La Chaise-Dieu choir and the Vauluisant vocal ensemble. She taught choral conducting for two years at the Conservatoire à rayonnement régional de Poitiers.

In 2012, she prepared an opera, Orfeo, par-delà le Gange in India with an Odissi dancer, Hindu musicians, and young Indian singers. The work was premiered in Delhi and Paris in 2013 and on tour until 2016.

In 2014, she toured the United States, Russia and the United Kingdom.

In August 2018 she was the initiator of a singing competition, Voices of India.

== Discography ==
- See Akadêmia

== Bibliography ==
- Emmanuelle Giuliani. "Françoise Lasserre, une musicienne bien peu académique". La Croix (in French).
- Dix questions à Françoise Lasserre La vie en Champagne No. 68
- Documentation musicale de Radio France (May 2018). "Françoise Lasserre, Cheffe de chœur française". France Musique (in French).
