= Christina Pluhar =

Austrian musician (born 1965)

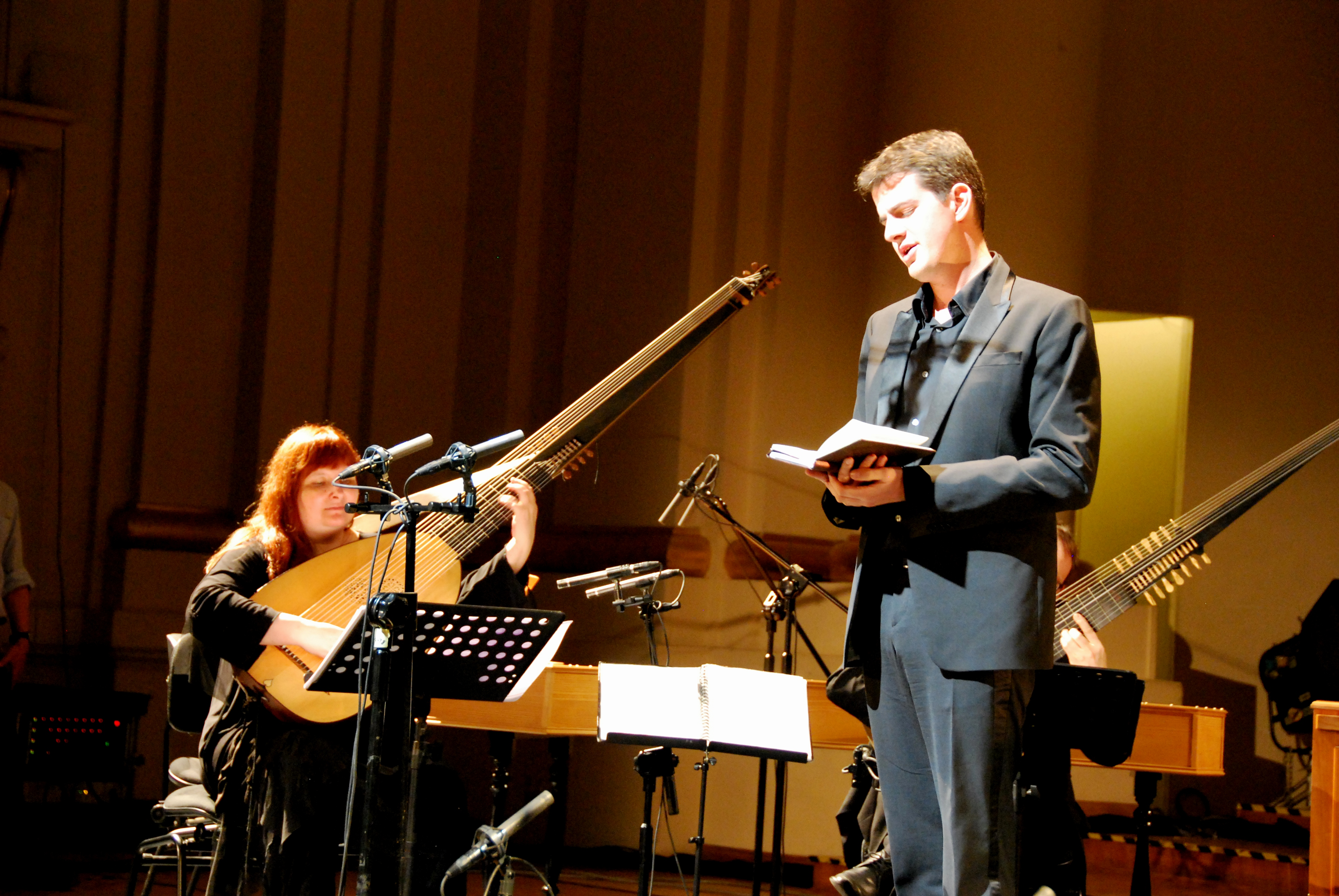
Christina Pluhar, with Philippe Jaroussky, Misteria Paschalia 2011

Christina Pluhar (born 1965, Graz, Austria) is a theorbist, harpist, conductor, and the founder of the early music ensemble L'Arpeggiata.

She discovered her passion for early music while studying at the University of Graz and went on to specialize in the lute, theorbo, and Baroque guitar. She studied at the Royal Conservatory of The Hague and the Schola Cantorum Basiliensis.

In 1992, as a member of Ensemble La Fenice, Pluhar won first prize at the Festival of Early Music in Malmö. Since then, she has been based in Paris, performing both as a soloist and as a basso continuo player in the Baroque music scene. In 2000, she set up L'Arpeggiata.

== Discography ==
Albums

- 2004: Landi: homo fugit velut umbra
- 2004: Al Improvviso: Ciaconne, Bergamasche et un po' di folie
- 2004: Kapsberger: La Villanella
- 2004: La Tarantella: antidotum tarantulae
- 2005: Cavalieri: rappresentatione di anima et di corpo
- 2007: Los Impossibles
- 2009: Monteverdi: Teatro d'Amore
- 2010: Via Crucis
- 2011: Vespro della Beata Vergine
- 2012: Los Pajaros Perdidos
- 2013: Mediterraneo
- 2014: Music for a While
- 2015: Cavalli: L'amore innamorato
- 2016: Orfeo Chamán
- 2017: Händel Goes Wild
- 2018: Himmelsmusik
- 2021: Alla Napoletana
- 2023: Passacalle de la Follie
- 2024: Wonder Women
- 2025: Terra Mater, together with Malena Ernman
- 2025: Orfeo son io, together with Rolando Villazón
