= Ensemble La Fenice =

Ensemble La Fenice is a period wind band based in the town of Auxerre in the Burgundy region of France.

Founded in 1990 by the cornett player Jean Tubéry, the ensemble specializes in music of the Baroque era played on period instruments.
