= Jean Tubéry =

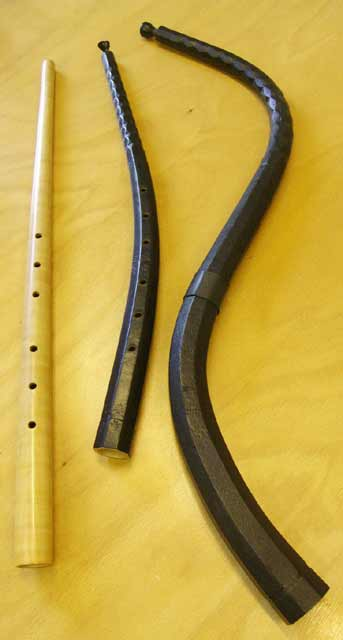
Three different cornetts: mute cornett, curved cornett and tenor cornett

Jean Tubéry (1964 born in Toulouse) is a French player of the cornett (cornetto) and conductor. He is noted for being, along with his own teacher Bruce Dickey and his colleague Jean-Pierre Canihac, one of the main cornett players to resurrect the baroque instrument, cornet à bouquin, as part of the historically informed performance movement and early music revival.

Tubéry originally studied recorder at his home town Toulouse and then at the Amsterdam Conservatory, but decided to switch to cornet and undertook studies with Bruce Dickey at the Schola Cantorum Basiliensis. During the 1980s and 1990s he performed with almost all of the well known early music ensembles of the period including Les Arts Florissants under William Christie, La Petite Bande under Sigiswald Kuijken, the Clemencic Consort of René Clemencic, Hesperion XXI under Jordi Savall, as well as the Ensemble Clément Janequin of Dominique Visse, Collegium Vocale de Gand for Philippe Herreweghe, Concerto Vocale of René Jacobs, the Huelgas Ensemble of Paul Van Nevel, Cantus Cölln and Konrad Junghänel, The Ensemble Elyma of Gabriel Garrido and so on.

For the Ricercar record label and with the label's own Ricercar Ensemble Tubéry commenced a series of recordings of Venetian wind music, in part entitled L'héritage de Monteverdi. This continued when he founded his own Ensemble La Fenice. La Fenice won the first prize at the Concours International de Musique Ancienne of Bruges in 1990. Having studied as a cornettist Tubéry furthered studied choral conducting with Hans Martin Linde and Pierre Cao. He is from 2001 the chief early-music conductor of the Chœur de chambre de Namur, and has also served as guest conductor with the Ensemble Jacques Moderne of Tours, Pierre Cao's Ensemble Arsys and the Scottish Dunedin Consort.

Tubéry teaches cornett at the Conservatoire Supérieur C.N.R. of Paris and his students include several rising performers in the younger generation of cornettists. In 2001 Tubéry was named a Chevalier de l'ordre des Arts et des Lettres by the Minister of Culture Catherine Tasca.

In June 2024, Tubéry was convicted of sexual harassment, and given a six-month suspended sentence.
