= Philippe Cantor =

French opera singer

Philippe Cantor is a contemporary French bass-baritone.

== Biography ==
First of all, Cantor turned his attention towards the interpretation of ancient music by the ensembles Ensemble Clément Janequin, Huelgas Ensemble, and Ensemble Organum.

His soloist career began with the ensemble Les Arts Florissants of William Christie, of which he was one of the pillars during the 1980s, along with Agnès Mellon, Guillemette Laurens, Jill Feldman, Monique Zanetti, Dominique Visse, Étienne Lestringant, Michel Laplénie, Gregory Reinhart, François Fauché, and Antoine Sicot.

He also sang the baroque repertoire under the direction of Jean-Claude Malgoire, Sigiswald Kuijken, René Jacobs, Christophe Coin, David Stern, Jean-Christophe Frisch and Gilbert Bezzina with whom he made several recordings.

In 1992, he won the Concours de Rennes for his interpretation of Golaud's role (Pelléas et Mélisande - Debussy) and approached the roles of the 19th and 20th century repertoire, until the creation of contemporary works by Antoine Duhamel, Pierre Jansen, Jacques Veyrier, Jean-Claude Wolff (who composed several cycles of melodies for him); Maurice Ohana, Henri Dutilleux, Philippe Forget conducted by Jean-Marc Cochereau (Orchestre Région-centre), Robert Martignoni (Orchestre de Bretagne), Philippe Bender (Orchestre Régional Provence-Côte d'Azur), Jean-Louis Forestier (Ensemble Musique vivante), Jacques Mercier (Orchestre national d'Île-de-France), Christian Zacharias (Orchestre de Chambre de Lausanne), and Ensemble 2e2m.

Today, he divides his activities between Baroque music (with the Ensemble baroque de Nice conducted by Gilbert Bezzina; the ensemble Fuoce E Cenere - Jay Bernfeld; La Compagnie Fêtes Galantes - Béatrice Massin); oratorios; recitals (with pianists Sophie Rives, Mara Dobresco, Jean-François Ballevre, Didier Puntos, Laurent Wagschal; chamber music (with the vocal ensemble "Les Solistes de Lyon" led by Bernard Tetu, accompanied by Philippe Cassard, Noël Lee, Jean-Claude Pennetier) and the stage where he was particularly noticed in the roles of Pimpinone (Telemann), Don Alfonso (Mozart: Cosi fan Tutte), Leporello (Mozart: Don Giovanni), Mamma Agata (Donizetti), Golaud (Debussy): Pelléas and Mélisande), The Celebrant (Bernstein: Mass), Macbeth (Philippe Forget: Macbeth) to the musical Sweeney Todd (Sondheim).

In 2013, he took part as a singer-actor in the performances of Henrik Ibsen's La dame de la mer by the Teatro Malandro, directed by Omar Porras.

His latest recordings are devoted to French melody with pianist Sophie Rives, published by "Anima Records": Claude Debussy (in 2010), Francis Poulenc (in 2012), and Maurice Ravel.

== Discography (selection) ==
=== With Les Arts Florissants ===
- 1980: Marc-Antoine Charpentier's Caecilia, Virgo et Martyr H.413 (bass)
- 1980: Marc-Antoine Charpentier's Filius Prodigus H.399 (bass)
- 1981: Marc-Antoine Charpentier's Pastorale sur la Naissance de N.S. Jésus-Christ H.483
- 1981: Claudio Monteverdi's Altri Canti (baritone)
- 1982: Marc-Antoine Charpentier's In nativitatem D.N.J.C. canticum H.414 (baritone)
- 1982: Marc-Antoine Charpentier's Les Arts florissants H.487
- 1982: Luigi Rossi's Oratorios (Il pecator pentito, O Cecità del misero mortale) (baritone)
- 1982: Marc-Antoine Charpentier's Antienne "O" de l'Avent H.37 - 43
- 1983: Claudio Monteverdi's Il ballo delle ingrate (baritone)
- 1983: Marc-Antoine Charpentier's In nativitatem Domini canticum H.416 (bass)
- 1983: Marc-Antoine Charpentier's Pastorale sur la Naissance de Notre Seigneur Jésus-Christ H.482 (bass)
- 1984: Marc-Antoine Charpentier's Médée H.491 (baritone)
- 1984: Michel Lambert's Airs de cour (1689) (baritone)
- 1986: Marc-Antoine Charpentier's Le Reniement de Saint Pierre H.424 (baritone)
- 1986: Marc-Antoine Charpentier's Méditations pour le Carême H.380 - 389 (bass)
- 1986: Henry Purcell's Dido and Eneas (Eneas)
- 1989: Luigi Rossi's Oratorio per la Settimana Santa (bass)

=== With the Ensemble Clément-Janequin ===
- 1982: Paschal de L'Estocart's Octonaires De La Vanité Du Monde
- 1982: Les cris de Paris: songs by Janequin & Sermisy
- 1987: Schütz: Die sieben Worte Jesu Christi am Kreuz
- 1989: Pierre de La Rue's Messe L'homme armé - Requiem

=== With the Ensemble Organum ===
- Chants de l'Église de Rome - Période byzantine

=== With La Grande Écurie et La Chambre du Roy ===
- 1987: Marc-Antoine Charpentier: "Vêpres Solennelles" H.540, H.190, H.50, H.149, H.52, H.150, H.51, H.161, H.191, H.65, H.77, John Elwes, Ian Honeyman, tenors, Agnès Mellon, Brigitte Bellamy, sopranos, Dominique Visse, Jean Nirouet, countertenors, Philippe Cantor, Jacques Bona, baritones, Choeur régional- Nord Pas de Calais, La Grande Écurie et la Chambre du Roy, Odile Bailleux, organ, conducted by Jean-Claude Malgoire (2 CD CBS Sony 1987)
- 1991 : Marc-Antoine Charpentier, Messe à 4 chœurs H.4, Ensemble Vocal Jean Bridier, Ensemble Vocal Françoise Herr, Chœur Gabrieli, Chœur régional Nord-Pas-de-Calais, La Grande Écurie et La Chambre du Roy, conducted by Jean Claude Malgoire. CD Erato.

=== With the Musiciens du Louvre ===
- 1988: Lully-Molière's Les Comédies-Ballets (bass)

=== With the Ensemble baroque de Nice (Gilbert Bezzina) ===
- 1993: Antonio Vivaldi's Dorilla in Tempe
- 1995: Giovanni Battista Pergolesi's La serva padrona
- 2000: Antonio Vivaldi's La Silvia
- 2003: Antonio Vivaldi's Rosmira fedele.

=== With the Ensemble XVIII 21 (Jean-Christophe Frisch) ===
- 1997: Jean-Philippe Rameau's Castor and Pollux
- 1998: Amiot's Messe des Jésuites de Pékin.

=== With Laurent Wagschal (piano) ===
- 2008: Mélodies inédites - J Cras

=== With Sophie Rives (piano) ===
- 2010: Mélodies - Claude Debussy
- 2012: Mélodies - Francis Poulenc
- 2014: Mélodies - Maurice Ravel
