= Antoine Sicot =

French opera singer (born 1953)

- Born: 1953 (age 72–73); Saint-Ouen-de-Sécherouvre
- Occupation: singer

Antoine Sicot (French: [ɑ̃twan siko]) is a contemporary French soloist singer specialising in the baroque repertoire for bass voice.

== Biography ==
Born in Saint-Ouen-de-Sécherouvre in Orne, Sicot worked a lot during the 1980s with the Baroque music ensemble Les Arts Florissants, spearhead of the "baroqueux" movement directed by William Christie.

He was then one of the pillars of this ensemble alongside Agnès Mellon, Jill Feldman, Monique Zanetti, Guillemette Laurens, Dominique Visse, Michel Laplénie, Étienne Lestringant, Philippe Cantor, Gregory Reinhart, François Fauché etc.

He also collaborated with the Ensemble Clément Janequin, La Chapelle Royale, the Ensemble Organum etc.

== Selected discography ==
=== With Les Arts Florissants ===
- 1982: Antienne "O" de l'Avent H.36-43 by Marc-Antoine Charpentier
- 1982: In nativitatem Domini Nostri Jesu Christi canticum H.414 by Marc-Antoine Charpentier
- 1983: Pastorale sur la Naissance de Notre Seigneur Jésus-Christ H.482 by Marc-Antoine Charpentier
- 1984: Médée H.491 by Marc-Antoine Charpentier
- 1984: Airs de Cour by Michel Lambert
- 1986: Le Reniement de saint Pierre H.424 by Marc-Antoine Charpentier
- 1986: Dido and Eneas by Henry Purcell
- 1987: Selva morale e spirituale by Claudio Monteverdi
- 1989: Oratorio per la Settimana Santa by Luigi Rossi
- 1990: Le Malade imaginaire H 495 by Marc-Antoine Charpentier

=== With Ensemble Clément Janequin ===
- 1982: Le Chant des Oyseaulx by Clément Janequin
- 1982: Octonaires De La Vanité Du Monde by Paschal de L'Estocart
- 1984: Amours de Ronsard by Antoine de Bertrand
- 1985: Fricassée parisienne on Harmonia Mundi
- 1987: Die sieben Worte Jesu Christi am Kreuz by Heinrich Schütz
- 1987: La Chasse by Clément Janequin
- 1988: Chansons by Josquin des Prez
- 1988: Messe L'homme armé et Requiem by Pierre de la Rue
- 2002: Missa Et ecce terrae motus by Antoine Brumel

=== With La Chapelle Royale ===
- 1992: Missa Viri Galilei by Palestrina (Ensemble Vocal Européen de la Chapelle Royale and Ensemble Organum)

=== With Ensemble Organum ===
- 1985: Songs of the Church of Rome - Byzantine Period
- 1986: Missa Pange lingua by Josquin des Prez
- 1988: Chants de l'église Milanaise
- 1989: Carmina Burana
- 1990: The Play of the Pilgrimage to Emmaus.
- 1990: Messe de Tournai
- 1991: Old Roman chant
- 1992: Requiem by Johannes Ockeghem
- 1994: Messe de la Nativité de la Vierge
- 1995: Messe de Nostre Dame by Guillaume de Machaut
- 2004: Compostela. Ad Vesperas Sancti Iacobi - Codex Calixtinus
