= Étienne Lestringant =

French opera singer

Étienne Lestringant is a contemporary French tenor specialising in the baroque repertoire.

== Biography ==
Étienne Lestringant was one of the first members of the baroque ensemble Les Arts Florissants convened by William Christie in Autumn 1979. During the 1980s he was one of the pillars of this ensemble, which was then the spearhead of the baroqueux movement, alongside Agnès Mellon, Jill Feldman, Guillemette Laurens, Monique Zanetti, Dominique Visse, Michel Laplénie, Philippe Cantor, Gregory Reinhart, François Fauché, Antoine Sicot etc.

Étienne Lestringant then sang for 5 years with the "Groupe Vocal de France" and the Clemencic Consort. More recently, he founded the "Ensemble vocal Frédéric Chopin", a group of amateur singers open to students of the Frédéric Chopin Conservatory of Paris and adults from outside the community.

== Discography (selection) ==
=== With Les Arts Florissants ===
- 1980: Filius Prodigus H.399 by Marc-Antoine Charpentier
- 1981: Pastorale sur la Naissance de N.S. Jésus-Christ H.483 by Marc-Antoine Charpentier
- 1981: Altri Canti by Claudio Monteverdi
- 1982: In nativitatem Domini Nostri Jesu Christi canticum H.414 by Marc-Antoine Charpentier
- 1982: Oratorios (Il pecator pentito, O Cecità del misero mortale) by Luigi Rossi
- 1982: Antienne "O" de l'Avent by Marc-Antoine Charpentier
- 1983: Il ballo delle ingrate by Claudio Monteverdi
- 1984: Airs de cour (1689) by Michel Lambert
- 1986: Dido and Aeneas by Henry Purcell (L'Esprit)
