= François Fauché =

French singer

François Fauché is a French soloist singer specializing in baroque repertoire for bass.

== Biography ==
François Fauché worked a lot during the 1980s with the ensemble of baroque music Les Arts Florissants, spearhead of the baroqueux movement, conducted by William Christie.

He was then one of the pillars of this ensemble, alongside Agnès Mellon, Jill Feldman, Monique Zanetti, Guillemette Laurens, Dominique Visse, Michel Laplénie, Étienne Lestringant, Philippe Cantor, Gregory Reinhart, Antoine Sicot etc.

He is a member of the Ensemble Clément Janequin conducted by Dominique Visse, with whom he took part in numerous concerts in France and abroad, as well as in numerous recordings.

He was also a member of the Ensemble Organum and the European ensemble William Byrd.

== Discography (selection) ==
=== With Les Arts Florissants ===
- 1983 : In nativitatem Domini canticum H.416 by Marc-Antoine Charpentier
- 1983: Pastorale sur la Naissance de Notre Seigneur Jésus-Christ H.482 by Marc-Antoine Charpentier
- 1984: Médée by Marc-Antoine Charpentier
- 1986: Dido and Aeneas by Henry Purcell
- 1986: Le Reniement de Saint Pierre H.424 by Marc-Antoine Charpentier
- 1986: Méditations pour le Carême H.380-389 by Marc-Antoine Charpentier
- 1987: Selva morale e spirituale by Claudio Monteverdi
- 1989: Oratorio per la Settimana Santa by Luigi Rossi
- 1989: Te Deum by Marc-Antoine Charpentier
- 1990: Le Malade Imaginaire H 495 by Marc-Antoine Charpentier
- Petits Motets by Jean-Baptiste Lully

=== With Ensemble Organum ===
- Chants de l'Église de Rome - Période byzantine

=== With Ensemble Clément Janequin ===
- 1989: Pierre de La Rue : Missa L'Homme armé - Requiem
- 1994: Une fête chez Rabelais

=== With Concert Spirituel ===
- 1997: Leçons de Ténèbres by Joseph Michel
