= Odile Bailleux =

French organist and harpsichordist (1939–2024)

- Bailleux in the 1990s
- Born: 30 December 1939; Trappes, French Third Republic
- Died: 19 November 2024 (aged 84); Paris, France
- Occupations: Organist; harpsichordist; pedagogue

Odile Bailleux (French pronunciation: [ɔdil bajø]; 30 December 1939 – 19 November 2024) was a French harpsichordist and organist. She was a long-time organist of both Abbaye de Saint-Germain-des-Prés and Notre-Dame-des-Blancs-Manteaux in Paris. As a harpsichordist she was a pioneer of historically informed performance, co-founding the first French Baroque ensemble with early instruments.

== Life and career ==
Born in Trappes on 30 December 1939, Bailleux studied piano at the Versailles conservatory. She turned to the organ, studying at a music school in Paris, the École César Franck where she was in the organ class of Jean Fellot and Édouard Souberbielle. After she participated in 1964 in the International Academy of the Organ in Saint-Maximin-la-Sainte-Baume, she left in 1969 to work with the organist Helmut Walcha in Frankfurt. Walcha was known for his playing of Baroque works, but in her exploration of the world of Baroque organ music she was particularly inspired by Gustav Leonhardt.

Bailleux was the substitute for Antoine Reboulot at the grand organ of the Abbaye de Saint-Germain-des-Prés from 1966 where she became organiste titulaire, along with André Isoir, in 1973 and held the post for a long time. She was also organist at Notre-Dame-des-Blancs-Manteaux in Paris. In 1982, she served on the jury for the international competition for organ at MAfestival Brugge (Musica Antiqua Bruges) in Belgium.

As a harpsichordist she played continuo in the group Musique-Ensemble that she and oboist Michel Henry founded in 1975 as the first French Baroque ensemble with early instruments. She played harpsichord and later organ in the La Grande Écurie et la Chambre du Roy from 1977. She said: "... our dialogue resembled a bird conference. Lots of colour, lots of animation, very few solemn truths".

In 1992 her right arm was paralysed, and she was diagnosed with meningioma. She began to teach at the conservatoire of Bourg-la-Reine, retiring in 2004.

Bailleux died in Paris on 19 November 2024, at the age of 84.

== Recordings ==
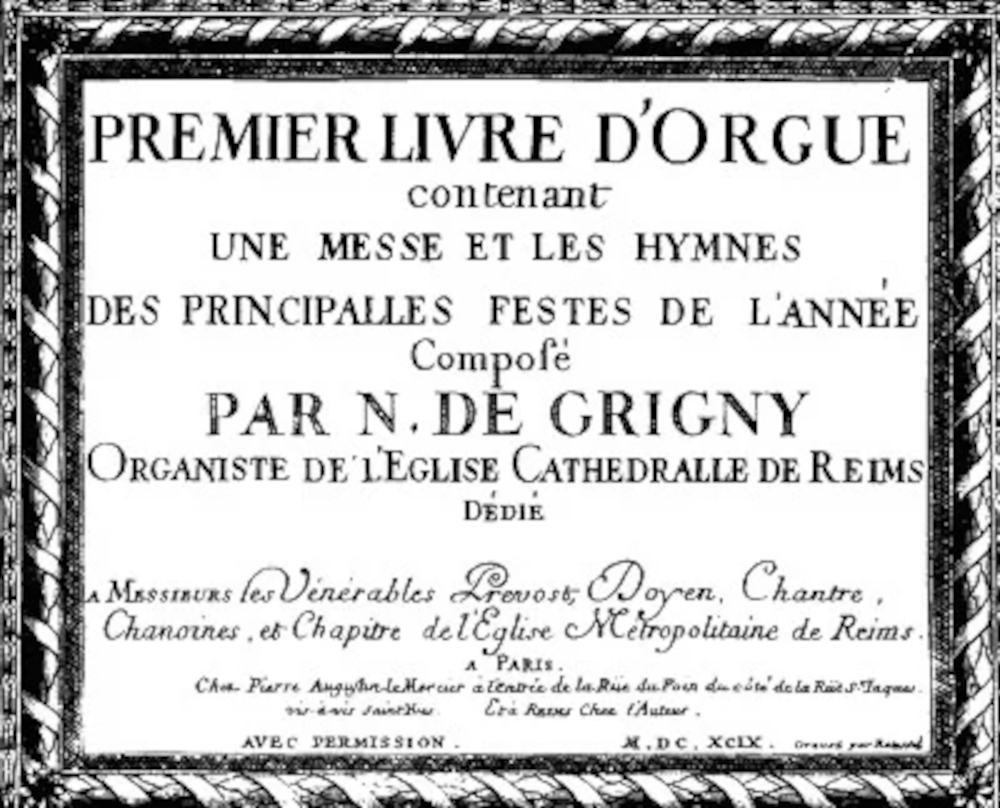
Title page of Grigny's work

Bailleux made only a few recordings as a soloist, French Baroque music and also Froberger and tientos by Correa de Arauxo. She played on a number of recordings by the conductor Jean-Claude Malgoire with his ensemble La Grande Écurie et la Chambre du Roy.

Her recording of Nicolas de Grigny's Premier livre d'orgue at the Moucherel/Formentelli organ of the Albi Cathedral in October 1983 was reissued in 2009 and was awarded a Diapason d'Or then. A reviewer summarised that she was a strong inventive person with "a taste for expressive suspensions" who found unusual but always appropriate tempos.

- Marc-Antoine Charpentier: Leçons de Ténèbres, H.96, H.97, H.98/108, H.102, H.103, H.109, H.105, H.106, H.110, H.100 a, Odile Bailleux, organ, La Grande Écurie et La Chambre du Roy conducted by Jean Claude Malgoire. 3 LP CBS 1978. OCLC 1011480816
- Charpentier: Messe de minuit pour Noël H.9, Henri Ledroit, John Elwes, Gregory Reinhart, Odile Bailleux, organ, Les Petits chanteurs de Chaillot, Roger Thirot (cond.), CD CBS, 1982
- Charpentier: "Vêpres Solennelles" H.540, H.190, H.50, H.149, H.52, H.150, H.51, H.161, H.191, H.65, H.77, John Elwes, Ian Honeyman, tenors, Agnès Mellon, Brigitte Bellamy, sopranos, Dominique Visse, Jean Nirouet, countertenors, Philippe Cantor, Jacques Bona, baritones, Choeur régional- Nord Pas de Calais, La Grande Écurie et la Chambre du Roy, Odile Bailleux, organ, conducted by Jean-Claude Malgoire (2 CD CBS Sony 1987)
- Charpentier: Messe à 4 Chœurs H.4, Odile Bailleux, organ, Choeur régional Nord-Pas-de-Calais, La Grande Écurie et La Chambre du Roy, conducted by Jean Claude Malgoire. CD Erato 1991.
- Johann Jakob Froberger: Œuvres pour orgue : Toccata, Ricercare, Canzone…, at the chapel organ of the Séminaire de jeunes à Avignon and at the Église Saint-Sauveur de Manosque (1977, Disque Stil 2810S77)
- Mozart (1986). Requiem, Church sonatas K 278 and K 336 ... Odile Bailleux, org; la Grande Ecurie et la Chambre du Roy; Jean-Claude Malgoire (cond.) (Music CD) (in Latin). [S.l.], [S.l.]: CBS (Europe); Distrib. CBS disques SA (France). OCLC 658349448.
- Grigny, Nicolas de; Bailleux, Odile (2008). Livre d'orgue (Music CD) (in no linguistic content). [S.l.]: Gueul'Ard. OCLC 717413265.
- Correa de Arauxo, Francisco; Bailleux, Odile (1992). Facultad organica (Music CD). [S.l.]: Erato. OCLC 715630014.
