= Agnès Mellon =

French soprano (born 1958)

Agnès Mellon (born 17 January 1958) is a French soprano who specializes in baroque music.

== Biography ==
Agnès Mellon started her career in 1981 with the baroque ensemble Les Arts Florissants, directed by William Christie, with whom, between 1981 and 1993, she interpreted Marc-Antoine Charpentier, Monteverdi, Luigi Rossi, Michel Lambert, Henry Purcell, Jean-Baptiste Lully, Michel Pignolet de Montéclair, Jean-Philippe Rameau and others. During the 1980s, she was one of the ensemble's regular singers, together with Guillemette Laurens, Jill Feldman, Dominique Visse, Étienne Lestringant, Michel Laplénie, Philippe Cantor, Gregory Reinhart, and François Fauché.

Starting in 1985, Mellon also worked under the direction of Philippe Herreweghe, with La Chapelle Royale (1985–1990) and the Collegium Vocale Gent (1990–1996), interpreting Charpentier, Heinrich Schütz, Monteverdi, Jean Gilles, and Johann Sebastian Bach.

At the end of the 1980s, she worked regularly with the Belgian ensemble Ricercar Consort, under the artistic direction of the Belgian musicologist Jérôme Lejeune. She also worked with various conductors, including Dominique Visse, René Jacobs, Marc Minkowski, John Eliot Gardiner, Christophe Rousset, and Gérard Lesne.

Beginning in the 1990s, she dedicated herself to teaching. She also participates in master classes in (Paris, Montreal, and Kyoto). In 1992, she gave an exceptional interpretation of Henry Purcell's songs, traditionally interpreted only by countertenors such as Alfred Deller and James Bowman. In 1997, she founded her own baroque ensemble, Barcarole, whose first recording was released in 2005.

Mellon is married to French countertenor and conductor Dominique Visse.

== Recordings ==
Mellon has made many recordings, most of them in the field of baroque music.

=== With Les Arts Florissants ===
- 1981 : Pastorale sur la Naissance de N.S. Jésus-Christ H.483, In Nativitatem D.N.J.C. Canticum H.414, Marc-Antoine Charpentier
- 1981 : Altri Canti, Claudio Monteverdi
- 1982 : Antienne "O" de l'Avent H.37- 43, Marc-Antoine Charpentier
- 1982 : Les Arts Florissants H.487, Marc-Antoine Charpentier
- 1982 : Actéon H.481, Marc-Antoine Charpentier
- 1982 : Oratorios (Il pecator pentito, O Cecità del misero mortale), Luigi Rossi
- 1983 : Un Oratorio de Noël "In nativitatem Domini canticum" H.416, Sur la Naissance de N.S. Jésus-Christ H.482, Marc-Antoine Charpentier
- 1983 : Il Ballo delle Ingrate, Claudio Monteverdi
- 1984 : Airs de Cour, Michel Lambert
- 1984 : Médée H.491, Marc-Antoine Charpentier
- 1985 : Le Reniement de Saint Pierre H.424, Marc-Antoine Charpentier
- 1986 : Dido and Aeneas, Henry Purcell
- 1987 : Atys, Jean-Baptiste Lully
- 1988 : La Mort de Didon, Michel Pignolet de Monteclair
- 1989 : Oratorio per la Settimana Santa, Luigi Rossi
- 1991 : Orfeo, Luigi Rossi
- 1993 : Castor et Pollux, Jean-Philippe Rameau

These recordings were all published by Harmonia Mundi France.

=== With La Chapelle Royale ===
- 1985 : "Motet Pour l'Offertoire de la Messe Rouge" H.434, "Oculi omnium" H.346, "Pour la seconde fois que le Saint Sacrement vient au même reposoir" H.372 and Miserere H.219, Marc-Antoine Charpentier
- 1987 : Musikalische Exequien, Heinrich Schütz
- 1987 : Vespro della Beata Vergina, Claudio Monteverdi (Chapelle Royale, Collegium Vocale, Saqueboutiers, Toulouse)
- 1990 : Requiem, Jean Gilles
- 1990 : Magnificat BWV 243, Johann Sebastian Bach

These recordings were all published by Harmonia Mundi France.

=== With Ricercar Consort ===
- 1988 : Deutsche Barock Kantaten (III) (Schein, Tunder, Buxtehude)
- 1989 : Deutsche Barock Kantaten (V) (Hammerschmidt, Selle Johann Hermann Schein, Heinrich Schütz, Franz Tunder, Weckmann, Lübeck)
- 1989 : Motets à deux voix, Henri Dumont

These recordings were all published by Ricercar.

=== With Collegium Vocale Gent ===
- 1990 : Missae, BWV 234 & 235, Sanctus, BWV 238, Johann Sebastian Bach
- 1991 : Missae, BWV 233 & 236, Johann Sebastian Bach
- 1993 : Kantaten, BWV 39, 93 & 107, Johann Sebastian Bach
- 1996 : Geistliche Chormusik, Heinrich Schütz

These recordings were all published by Virgin Classics.

=== With Barcarole, founded and directed by Agnès Mellon ===
- 2005 : Les Déesses outragées, cantatas of Louis-Nicolas Clérambault, Philippe Courbois and François Colin de Blamont
- 2011 : Parole e querele d'amore

=== Recordings ===
- 1987: Marc-Antoine Charpentier: "Vêpres Solennelles" H.540, H.190, H.50, H.149, H.52, H.150, H.51, H.161, H.191, H.65, H.77, John Elwes, Ian Honeyman, tenors, Agnès Mellon, Brigitte Bellamy, sopranos, Dominique Visse, Jean Nirouet, countertenors, Philippe Cantor, Jacques Bona, baritones, Choeur régional- Nord Pas de Calais, La Grande Écurie et la Chambre du Roy, Odile Bailleux, organ, conducted by Jean-Claude Malgoire (2 CD CBS Sony 1987)
- 1987 : Die sieben Worte Jesu Christi am Kreuz by Heinrich Schütz, Ensemble Clément Janequin (dir. Dominique Visse), Saqueboutiers, Toulouse
- 1987 : Duos et Cantates, Giacomo Carissimi, Concerto Vocale, dir. René Jacobs
- 1988 : Les Comédies-Ballets, Lully-Molière, Les Musiciens du Louvre, dir. Marc Minkowski
- 1988 : Scylla et Glaucus, Jean-Marie Leclair, Monteverdi Choir & English Baroque Soloists, dir. John Eliot Gardiner
- 1992 : Songs from Orpheus Britannicus, Henry Purcell, interpreted by Agnès Mellon, Christophe Rousset and Wieland Kuijken
- 1993 : Cantiques Spirituels de Jean Racine, Pascal Colasse, Les Talens Lyriques, dir. Christophe Rousset
- 1993 : Motets à une ou deux voix, Daniel Danielis, Les Talens Lyriques, dir. Christophe Rousset
- 1993 : Leçons de Ténèbres, Office du Vendredi Saint H.105, H.95, H.140, H.133, H.130, H.99, H.100, Marc-Antoine Charpentier, Il Seminario Musicale, dir. Gérard Lesne
- 2003 : Maria, Madre de Dio (Handel, Ferrandini, Scarlatti), ensemble Arion, dir. Monica Huggett
- 1997 : Chabrier mélodies (with Franck Leguérinel); Françoise Tillard (piano) - Timpani

== Opera roles ==
Agnès Mellon has played several opera roles, all of them in the field of baroque music:

- Actéon, Marc-Antoine Charpentier (Diane)
- Médée, Marc-Antoine Charpentier (Créuse)
- Atys, Jean-Baptiste Lully (Sangaride)
- Orfeo, Luigi Rossi (Orfeo)
- Castor et Pollux, Jean-Philippe Rameau (Télaïre)
- Scylla et Glaucus, Jean-Marie Leclair (Vénus)
