= Dorilla in Tempe =

Opera by Antonio Vivaldi

- Opera by Antonio Vivaldi
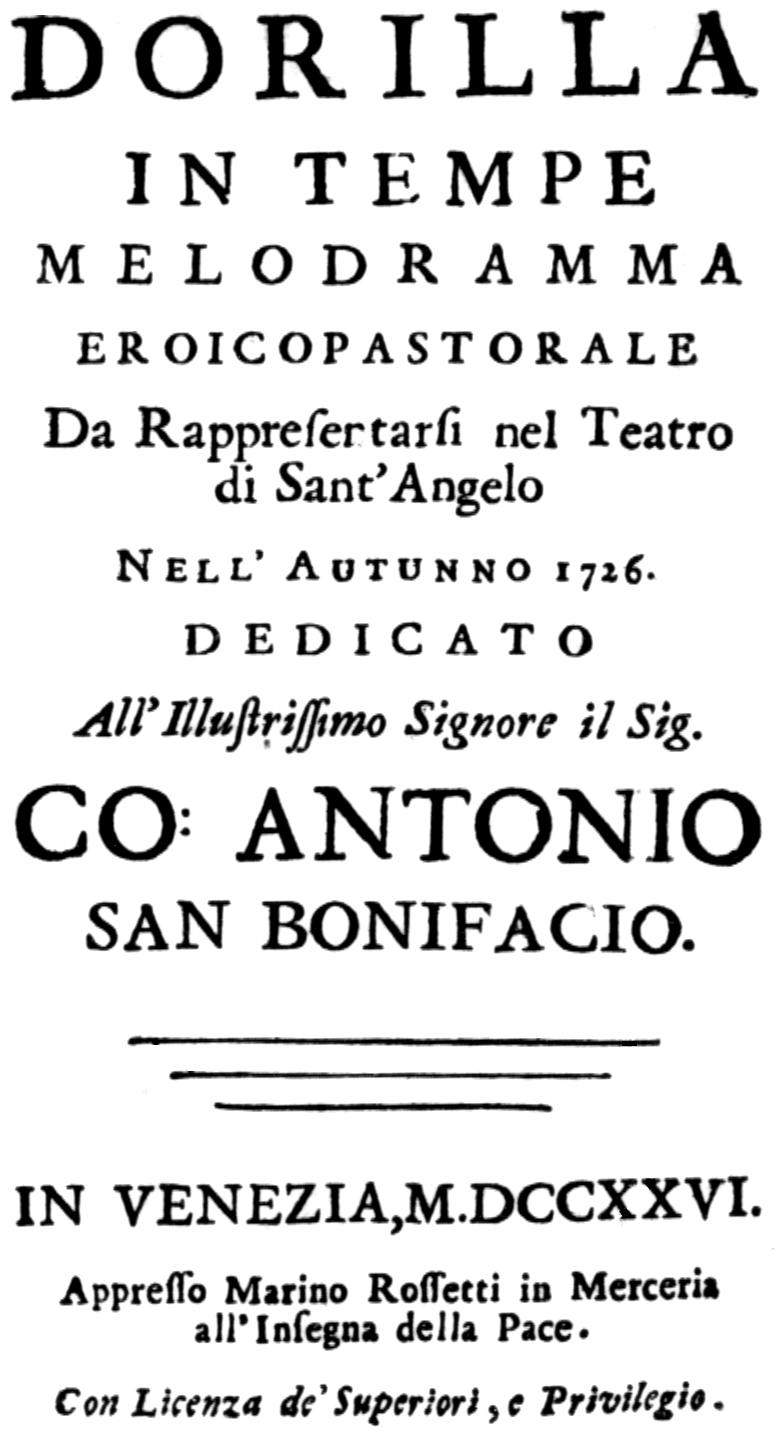
- Librettist: Antonio Maria Lucchini
- Language: Italian
- Premiere: 9 November 1726; Teatro San Angelo, Venice

Dorilla in Tempe is a melodramma eroico pastorale or opera in three acts by composer Antonio Vivaldi with an Italian libretto by Antonio Maria Lucchini. The opera premiered at the Teatro San Angelo in Venice on 9 November 1726. Vivaldi later revised the opera numerous times for several different performances throughout the second half of his career.

== History ==
Dorilla in Tempe was well received at its premiere and became one of Vivaldi's personal favorites. The opera was the first work by Vivaldi to include in its cast the mezzo-soprano Anna Girò, who went on to form a lifelong friendship and professional partnership with the composer. The opera was also noted for its visual aspects, boasting some of the most elaborate sets (by Antonio Mauro) in the history of opera up to that point and for its beautiful choreography by Giovanni Galletto.

In 1728 the opera was revived at the small Teatro San Margherita in Venice with an almost identical text, and again in Prague at the Sporck Theatre in the spring of 1732, this time with substantial alterations to the libretto. During Carnival 1734 the opera was revived at the Teatro San Angelo, this time as a pasticcio using recent music by other composers, including Hasse, Giacomelli and Leo.

== Music ==
The only surviving score of Dorilla in Tempe, located in Turin, is from this 1734 pastiche production. The score includes not only the many insertions into the opera but also a number of the deletions from earlier productions. Unusually for Vivaldi's operatic scores, the sinfonia is clearly linked with the main opera: it follows the title-page instead of preceding it, and the music of its final movement – a C major version of the opening of the Spring concerto – reappears in the opera's opening chorus, appropriately in praise of spring. The opera displays a pastoral nature, particularly in its choral and ballet music, that is at times mixed with heroic elements, as in the elaborate celebrations at the end of Act 2, where a hunt is enacted to the inevitable horn accompaniment.

== 1734 Pasticcio Arias ==
Aria	Composer	Original opera	Original aria
Mi lusinga il dolce affetto (Elmiro)	Hasse	Catone in Utica (1731)	
Non ha più pace il cor amante (Elmiro, sc.7, act III)	Hasse	Cajo Fabricio (1732)	Non ha più pace l'amor geloso (Pirro's aria, sc.4, act II), originally sung by Caffarelli.
Saprò ben con petto forte (Elmiro)	Hasse	Issipile	Non è ver benché si dica
Rete, lacci o strali adopra (Filindo's aria, sc.9, act I)	Giacomelli	Alessandro Severo (1732)	Forte lume esposto al vento (Albina's aria, sc.16, act II), originally sung by Marianino Nicolini.
Non vuo' che un infedele (Filindo's aria, sc.9, act II)	Giacomelli	Alessandro Severo (1732)	Non vuo' che un infedele (Albina's aria, sc.5, act I), originally sung by Marianino Nicolini.
Se penar per un bel volto (Nomio's aria, sc.7, act II)	Giacomelli	Semiramide riconosciuta (1730)	Bel piacer saria d'un core (Mirteo's aria, sc.7, act I), originally sung by Anna Bagnolesi.
Se ostinata a me resisti (Admeto's aria, sc.5, act II)	Sarro	Valdemaro (1726)	Se si perde il buon nocchiero (Sivardo's aria, sc.2, act I), originally sung by Antonio Barbieri.
Vorrei da lacci scogliere (Elmiro)	Leo	Demetrio (1732)	

== Roles ==
Role	Voice type	Premiere Cast, 9 November 1726	Cast, Teatro Sporck, Prague Spring 1732	Cast, Teatro Sant'Angelo, Venice Carnival 1734
Dorilla, daughter of Admeto, in love with Elmiro	soprano	Angela Capuano, "la Capuanina"	Anna Cosini	Anna Caterina Della Parte
Admeto, King of Thessaly	bass	Lorenzo Moretti	Giovanni Micheli	Massimiliano Miller
Nomio, the god Apollo disguised as a shepherd, in love with Dorilla	contralto castrato (1726) contralto (1732/34)	Filippo Finazzi	Giacinta Constantini	Angela Zanucchi
Elmiro, a shepherd, in love with Dorilla	soprano en travesti (1726) tenor (1732)	Maria Maddalena Pieri	Antonio Denzi	Francesco Bilanzoni
Eudamia, a nymph, in love with Elmiro	mezzo-soprano	Anna Girò	Cecilia Ramis	Marta Arriggoni
Filindo, in love with Eudamia	contralto castrato (1726/34) contralto (1732)	Domenico Giuseppe Galletti	Margherita Flora	Mariniano Nicolini

== Synopsis ==
IN BRIEF: The story takes place in Tempe. Like the music, the plot intertwines pastoral and heroic elements and centers on the shepherd Nomio, who is in fact Apollo in disguise. Nomio falls in love with Dorilla, the daughter of Admeto, King of Thessaly, who is herself in love with the shepherd Elmiro. Admeto is forced by the gods to save his kingdom by offering his daughter as a sacrifice to the sea-serpent Pitone, but she is rescued just in time by Nomio. Nomio claims the hand of Dorilla as his reward, but she remains reluctant and escapes with Elmiro. The pair are captured, and Elmiro is sentenced to death. Finally, however, the intervention of Nomio, revealing his divine identity, saves the situation and Dorilla and Elmiro are reunited.

MORE DETAIL:
Act One
In the Vale of Tempe, in Thessaly, nymphs and shepherds celebrate the coming of spring. Dorilla, daughter of King Admeto, is in love with the shepherd Elmiro. Nomio, who is equally smitten with her, tries in vain to attract the young girl's attention. In reality he is none other than Apollo disguised as a shepherd. King Admeto suddenly arrives and deplores the ravages of the dragon Python, which has just entered the kingdom. An oracle is to reveal what must be done. Nomio offers to face the monster. In a hallowed place surrounded by laurels and plane trees, the king and the afflicted people consult the Oracle of Tempe. As Admeto kindles the sacrificial flame, the laurels turn into cypresses, blood flows from the plane trees, and letters of fire appear above the altar. They bear this baleful decree: Tempe can only be saved if Dorilla is sacrificed to Python. Elmiro and the princess bemoan their fate. Princess Eudamia tries to console Elmiro, who unceremoniously rejects her. Then Filindo comes to console Eudamia in his turn. Rather than ignore him, she asks him to keep an eye on poor Elmiro as the price of her favours. Dorilla is lashed to a rock overhanging the seashore. She invokes the gods’ compassion. Python approaches to devour her. At this point Nomio bursts onto the scene and kills the monster. Dorilla and Admeto sing of their joy. But Nomio is offended by Dorilla's failure to thank him, while the people, carrying the beast's head in triumph, celebrate the end of their ordeal.

Act Two
Elmiro and Dorilla secretly confess their love. Admeto comes to demand that his daughter marry Nomio. Dorilla refuses. Then Eudamia reveals that the princess and the shepherd love each other. She has had Filindo spy on them. Dorilla defends herself by accusing Eudamia of being in love with Elmiro too. Filindo, overwhelmed with grief, now wishes to be avenged on Eudamia. The following scene depicts a banquet given in honour of Nomio during which Filindo and his friends prepare their quivers for the hunt.

Act Three
Elmiro has abducted Dorilla. Filindo offers to find the fugitives. Suddenly, Nomio arrives on the scene, bringing the couple back with him. Admeto immediately condemns Elmiro to death and orders his daughter to marry Nomio. Weeping, she declares that she prefers to die with her beloved. Incapable of softening her father's heart, she laments her fate. A remorseful Eudamia offers Elmiro her love in order to save him, but he prefers to reject her with scorn. Elmiro, tied to a tree, will soon be transfixed by the hunters’ arrows. Maddened by grief, Dorilla throws herself into the river. Elmiro begs the king for a swift death so that he may rejoin his beloved in a better world. As the archers bend their bows, the scene changes in a flash and Nomio appears. He has saved Dorilla from the water and reveals his divine identity to all. Now, as Apollo, he commands that Dorilla shall marry Elmiro, and Eudamia wed Filindo, since constancy and sincerity have saved love. The chorus echoes his august sentence.

== Recordings ==
- 1994 Dorilla: María Cristina Kiehr, Elmiro: John Elwes, Admeto: Philippe Cantor, Nomio/Apollo: Jean Nirouët. Ensemble Baroque de Nice, Gilbert Bezzina Opéra de Nice 1994, 2008
- 2017 Diego Fasolis, Romina Basso, Serena Malfi, Christian Senn, Marina De Liso, Sonia Prina, Lucia Cirillo. 2017 Naïve Records (in Naxos Catalog)
