= Philippe Courbois =

French composer

Philippe Courbois (fl. 1705–1730) was a French Baroque composer. It is commonly stated that he was maître de musique of the Duchess of Maine, but Michele Cabrini convincingly refutes this claim in his edition of Courbois's cantatas. At least three of his masses were performed for King Louis XIV at Versailles. Sometime before 1710, Courbois published a book of seven cantatas with texts by Louis Fuzelier, who would later write the libretto of Les Indes Galantes. It is these cantatas for which he is most famous today

== Works, editions, recordings ==
- L'amant timide (recorded on French Cantatas "Dans un bois solitaire" Gérard Lesne 1999 Virgin)
- Ariane (on Les Déesses outragées, Agnès Mellon, Alpha)
- Orphee (on Amour viens animer ma voix, Olivera, Ramée)
- Dom Quichotte - Loin des yeux qui m’ont fait captif, 1710 (text by Louis Fuselier) (on Cantates comiques, Dominique Visse, Cafe Zimmerman, Alpha)
- Airs Sérieux et à Boire, Dom Quichotte, Anne-Sophie Duprels, Sylvia Kevorkian, Jean-Louis Georgel, Marcos Pujol, dir. Iakovos Pappas, 2000 Arion.

Courbois was one of many minor French composers who cultivated the cantata during the Baroque period.
