= Éric Bellocq =

French lutenist (born 1962)

Éric Bellocq (born 8 September 1962) is a French lutenist.

== Biography ==
Éric Bellocq studied the guitar with Alexandre Lagoya at the Paris Conservatory, where he also graduated with a First Prize. He played the theorbo in the Baroque ensemble Les Arts Florissants, directed by William Christie, from 1983 to 1990; during this period he also regularly took part in opera productions and concert performances with Philippe Herreweghe's La Chapelle Royale, Marc Minkowski's Les Musiciens du Louvre, Christophe Rousset and Les Talens Lyriques, Jean-Claude Malgoire's La Grande Ecurie et la Chambre du Roy, Café Zimmermann, Hervé Niquet's Le Concert Spirituel, Françoise Lasserre's Akadêmia, Le Concert d'Astrée, Skip Sempé's Capricio Stravagante, and Jean Tubéry's La Fenice, and with the violinist Hélène Schmitt.

Since 1990 he has concentrated on solo performances and his role as lutenist in the Ensemble Clément Janequin, directed by Dominique Visse. Eric Bellocq accompanies Dominique Visse with the jazz pianist François Couturier in recitals of music ranging from Machaut to Berio; and with the juggler Vincent de Lavenère has created the staged show Le chant des balles - an encounter of early music, improvisation and juggling.

Éric Bellocq has made numerous recordings for Accord, Disques Adès of Lucien Adès, Alpha, Claves, Decca, Erato Records, harmonia mundi, Pierre Verany, Virgin Classics, Zig-Zag Territoires and also Frame (solo CD), King Records (Japan) with Dominique Visse, Naxos Records with a duo recital with Massimo Moscardo, and Pure Classics with Jean-Paul Fouchécourt. He teaches at the Paris Conservatory.

(copied from www.bellocq.info, with authorization by Eric Bellocq)
