= Cleofide =

Opera by Johann Adolph Hasse

- Opera by Johann Adolph Hasse
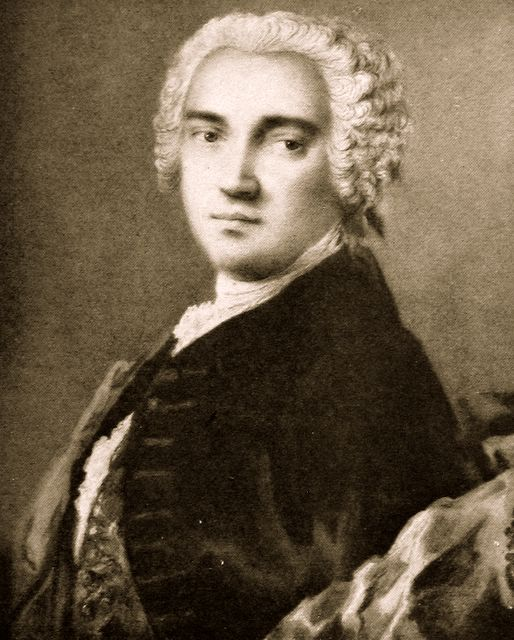
- The opera's composer, Johann Adolph Hasse
- Librettist: Pietro Metastasio (adapted by M. Boccardi)
- Premiere: 11 September 1731; Grosses Königliches Opernhaus, Dresden

Cleofide (Cleophis) is an opera seria in three acts by Johann Adolf Hasse. The Italian libretto was adapted from Metastasio's Alessandro nell'Indie by Michelangelo Boccardi.

Boccardi's adaptation of the libretto shifted the focus of the story to Cleofide, as the name suggests, instead of Alessandro as in Metastasio's original libretto.

== Performance history ==
Cleofide was first performed on 13 September 1731 at the Grosses Königliches Opernhaus am Zwingerhof in Dresden. The premiere was probably attended by Johann Sebastian Bach and his eldest son Wilhelm Friedemann Bach.

Hasse returned to the same subject for a new production at the Teatro San Giovanni Gristostomo in Venice on 4 November 1736, however the music was almost completely different. On that occasion, the original title of Metastasio's libretto was used: Alessandro nell'Indie.

Although successful after its premiere, the opera has faded into relative obscurity, though a revival was staged at the Semperoper Dresden in March 2005. An audio recording of the opera was produced in 1986. A critical edition of the Dresden 1731 version is also available (ed. Z. Mojzysz, Carus-Verlag, Stuttgart). One of Poro's arias, Generoso risvegliati, o core was featured in the film Farinelli (1994). Se mai più sarò geloso, a duet for Cleofide and Poro and the Cleofide-aria Son qual misera colomba are also relatively famous among baroque opera enthusiasts.

== Roles ==
Role	Voice type	Premiere Cast, 13 September 1731 (Conductor:)
Alessandro Magno (Alexander the Great)	alto castrato	Domenico Annibali
Poro (Porus), an Indian ruler	alto castrato	Domenico Campioli
Cleofide (Cleophis)	soprano	Faustina Bordoni (wife of the composer)
Erissena	soprano	Maria Santina Cattaneo
Gandarte	soprano castrato	Ventura Rocchetti
Timagene	alto castrato	Nicolò Pozzi

== Synopsis ==
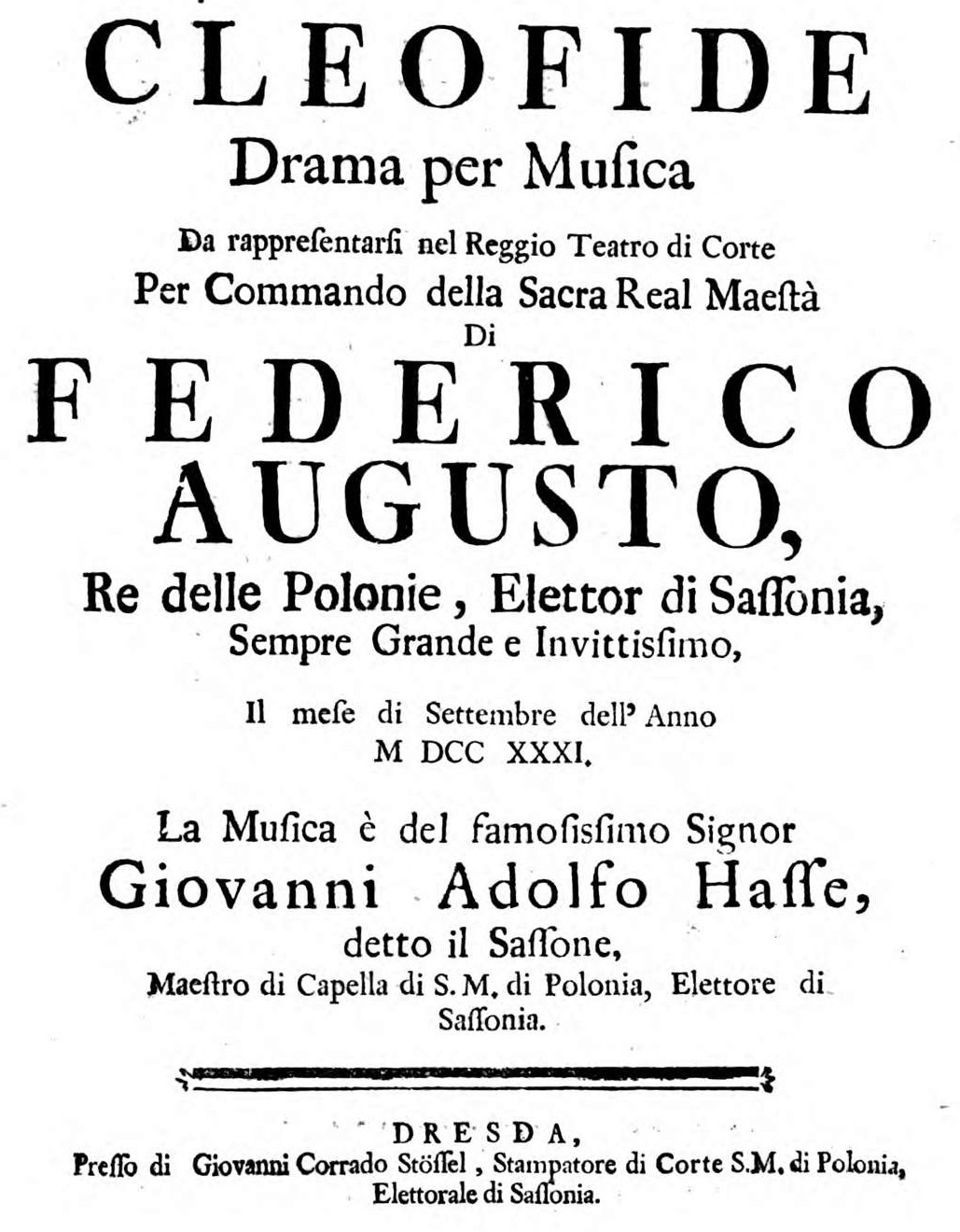
Title page of the original libretto

Act 1

Battlefield on the Banks of the Hydaspes. The army of the Indian King Poros has been utterly vanquished by Alexander's troops. Poros commands his fleeing soldiers to stand their ground against the invaders but is not obeyed. Poros intends to kill himself to avoid the impending humiliation but is hindered by his beloved Cleophis, queen of another part of India. She assures him of her love, but he breaks out in jealous recriminations, maintaining that she is actually Alexander's mistress. Gandartes, Poros' general, then warns his commander of the enemy's approach. Poros removes his crown and dons Gandartes's helmet so as to deceive the conqueror. Alexander appears together with Timagenes, his general. Even in this situation, fraught with external danger, Poros sees Alexander more as a rival in love than as a field marshal. This, however, does not prevent him from playing the part of Gandartes so impressively that Alexander is moved to give him a special present for Poros: the sword that once belonged to Darius, the Persian king. After Poros has departed, Timagenes presents a woman in chains, Poros' sister Eryxene. She has been captured, bound and handed over by two opportunistic Indians. But as they soon discover, Alexander deeply despises this sort of "tribute". He commands his men to untie her and to turn the betrayers over to her brother for punishment. Timagenes declares his love to Eryxene but is sharply rebuked; Alexander, without knowing it, has already won her heart. Timagenes, jealous, dreams up plans of revenge in which the troops are to be incited to mutiny against Alexander and to ally themselves with Poros.

A Palm Grove. Poros confronts his lover with renewed accusations of infidelity. Cleophis says she was only cajoling Alexander so as to move him to spare India, but Poros will hear nothing of it. But when Cleophis threatens to take refuge from Poros' jealousy by going into seclusion in the wilderness, he pledges to control his temper (and not for the first time, as we have seen). The Macedonians then deliver Eryxene to Cleophis and Poros. Eryxene tells them of Alexander's generosity, and Cleophis decides to hurry to him and lay her kingdom at his feet. At which Poros immediately forgets that he has promised to trust in Cleophis' fidelity. Fresh complications crop up: Poros seeks to find out from Eryxene whether or not Cleophis can be trusted but with only a few words succeeds in making his sister jealous of Cleophis. Gandartes enters the scene; Timagenes, lusting for revenge and believing him to be Poros, has revealed to him his traitorous scheme. But Poros has other worries of a more personal nature. Then follows a scene in which Eryxene, long betrothed to Gandartes, delicately prepares him for the news that she does not feel bound to a faithfulness that extends to the realm of thought, saying that "this sort of absolute devotion is no longer in fashion." If she is to choose him, then it will be only of her own free will. Left alone, Gandartes considers the merits of women who (unlike Eryxene) conceal their true feelings and who have only words of flattery for their loved ones.

Back to the Banks of the Hydaspes. Alexander reveals to his general Timagenes that he is in love with Cleophis but instructs him not to let her become aware of this weakness. Cleophis, with an entourage of Indians bearing lavish presents, pays her respects to Alexander. But Alexander says he desires only her loyalty, not her submission. Timagenes announces the arrival of a Duke Hasbytes. This is none other than Poros, whose jealousy is giving him no peace. He maliciously advises Alexander that Cleophis' vows of faithfulness are worthless - she, he says, has already betrayed the love of Poros, and Alexander is certainly to be her next victim. Cleophis "castles the king" with maneuvers on the emotional level, successful placating the skeptic. She instructs Hydaspes to inform Poros that her heart belongs to Alexander alone. This puts Alexander in a defensive position, for as we know, he cannot admit his love out of tactical considerations. He declares himself her friend and protector but makes it clear that that is all she can expect from him. To Poros this assertion of his masculine adversary is more credible than the combined attestations of his loved one and suffices to convince him of her fidelity.

Act 2

In the Royal Chambers of Poros. Poros consults with Gandartes on how to keep Alexander from crossing the Hydaspes. Eryxene announces the approach of Alexander. The attack has begun. When Poros hears that Cleophis is hurrying to meet with the enemy, he of course reacts in the manner we have long since come to expect. Eryxene implores her brother to allow her to accompany them to the battlefield.

Alexander's Army Camp. In the meantime, a bridge has been built across the river. Just as Cleophis is declaring her allegiance to the victor and promising him security in her kingdom, a renewed call to arms is sounded: Poros attacks, destroying the bridge. Gandartes and his men, constituting Poros' rear guard, finally save themselves by jumping into the Hydaspes. This is followed by a meeting between Cleophis and Poros. The fresh jealousy scene takes an unexpected turn. After Cleophis threatens to throw herself in to the raging waters of the river and Poros succeeds in restraining her, the lovers decide to marry at once. At that moment it becomes clear that they are surrounded by enemies; Poros wishes to kill first Cleophis and then himself, sparing both the humiliation of defeat. Alexander prevents Poros, whom he still believes is the duke Hasbytes, from carrying out his plans. Timagenes asks his commander to placate the army, who are blaming Cleophis' followers for the unanticipated Indian attack and demanding that the queen be put to death. Timagenes has Cleophis brought to the castle; Poros, for his part, is left behind as a prisoner. He accuses Timagenes of having betrayed him - although Timagenes had informed him of the Greeks' combat plans, Alexander had deviated from his customary position shortly before the battle. To prove his loyalty, Timagenes sets Poros free.

In Cleophis' Palace. Alexander sees only one way of saving Cleophis from the rage of his army, by taking her as his wife. Gandartes, who has eavesdropped on the conversation, enters, declares that he is Poros and offers his life in exchange for that of the queen. Once again, Alexander proves himself a magnanimous leader. He promises to grant Poros (who is actually Gandartes) and Hasbytes (Poros) their freedom. The endless confusion of mistaken identities takes on a new dimension: Eryxene appears with the news that after the battle on the bridge Poros had fallen into river and drowned (we know that Gandartes survived his perilous jump into the Hydaspes in good condition). Cleophis is left alone and deeply despondent.

Act 3

A colonnade in the Palace Garden. Gandartes reveals to Eryxene, Poros' sister, that Poros had not drowned in the Hydaspes. He gives her a conspiratory letter from General Timagenes and instructs her to take it to her brother. Meanwhile, Cleophis, who still believes that her lover is dead, consents to marry Alexander for the purpose of establishing peace between the Indians and the Greeks. Eryxene overhears the agreement and now believes in Cleophis' infidelity - as does Poros in any event. Alexander approaches with a guard: Timagenes' betrayal has come to light; Eryxene is interrogated and must admit to being implicated in the machinations. Timagenes, seeing the letter he wrote, also falls to his knees. Once again, Alexander lets mercy take precedence over justice. Poros, who has lost his most valuable ally in Timagenes, commands Gandartes to kill him. This time it is Eryxene who thwarts the suicidal impulse: she reports the impending marriage of Alexander and Cleophis, provoking a renewed round of Poros' jealousy. Cleophis is indeed planning to marry Alexander, believing she has lost her true love, but intends to commit suicide after the wedding. The wedding festivities begin. A pyre is ignited in veneration of the god Bacchus. Indians, Greeks, nymphs and fauns gather for the dance. Alexander bids Cleophis to place her hands in his - at which time she declares that she had already been married to Poros and now (in accordance with Indian custom) wishes to mount the pyre and follow him in death. The final scene in the opera resolves the general confusion. In the end no one has died and Alexander is given another opportunity to prove that he is a true model of noble character. He grants Poros and Cleophis their freedom and their empire, and Gandartes is given feudal tenure over the lands conquered by Alexander on the far side of the Ganges. Poros now shows himself to be high-minded, rewarding Gandartes' loyalty by marrying him to his sister Eryxene.

== Recordings ==
Hasse: Cleofide, Cappella Coloniensis (https://www.youtube.com/watch?v=PdE4tOZKMgU)

- Conductor: William Christie
- Roles (top to bottom): Erissena/Alessandro/Gandarte/Cleofide/Poro/Timagene
- Singers: Agnès Mellon/Dominique Visse/Randall Wong/Emma Kirkby/Derek Lee Ragin/David Cordier
- Recording date: 1986
- Label: Capriccio
