= L'incoronazione di Dario =

Opera by Antonio Vivaldi

- Dramma per musica by Antonio Vivaldi
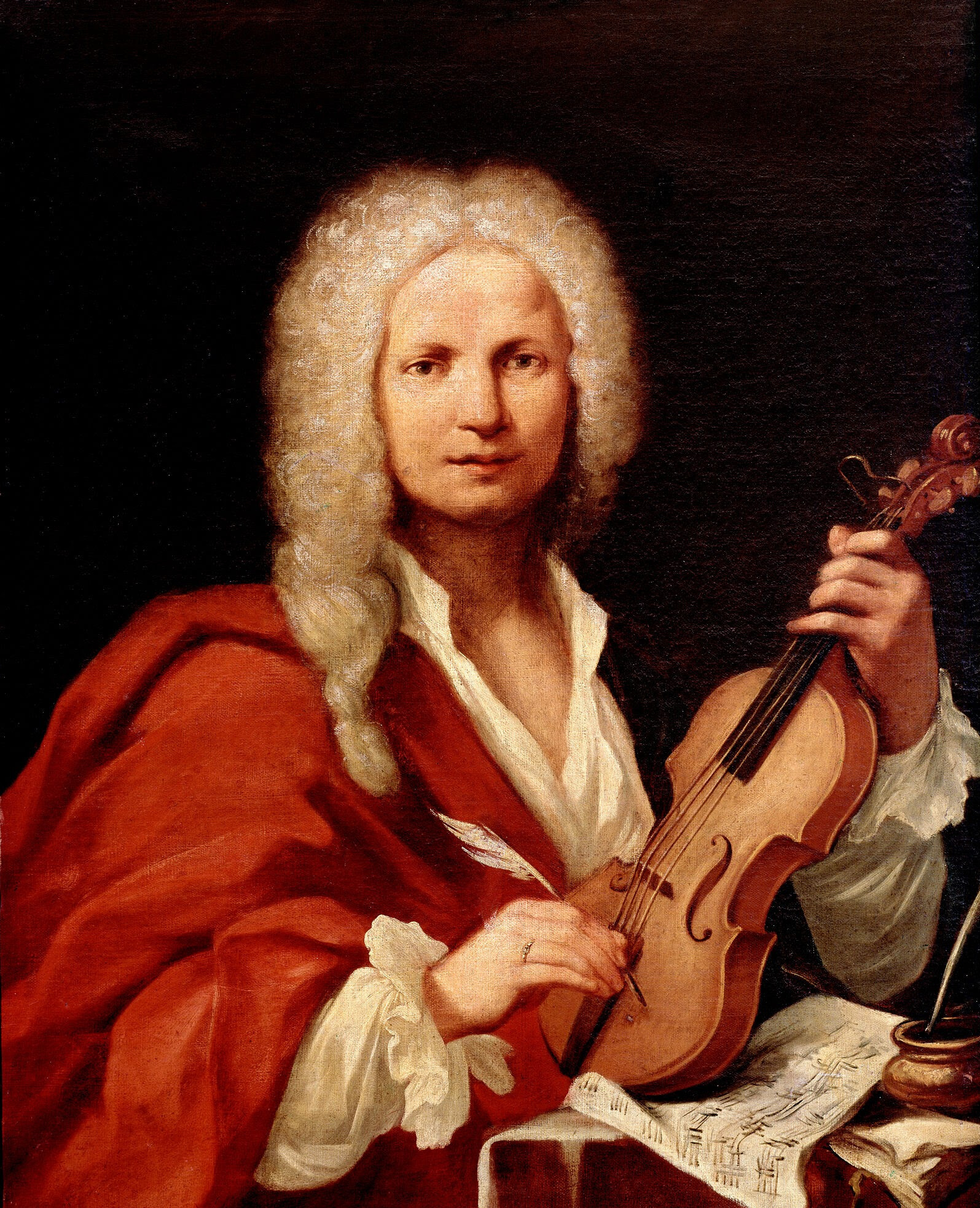
- Putative portrait of Antonio Vivaldi, c. 1723
- Librettist: Adriano Morselli
- Language: Italian
- Premiere: 23 January 1717; Teatro Sant'Angelo, Venice

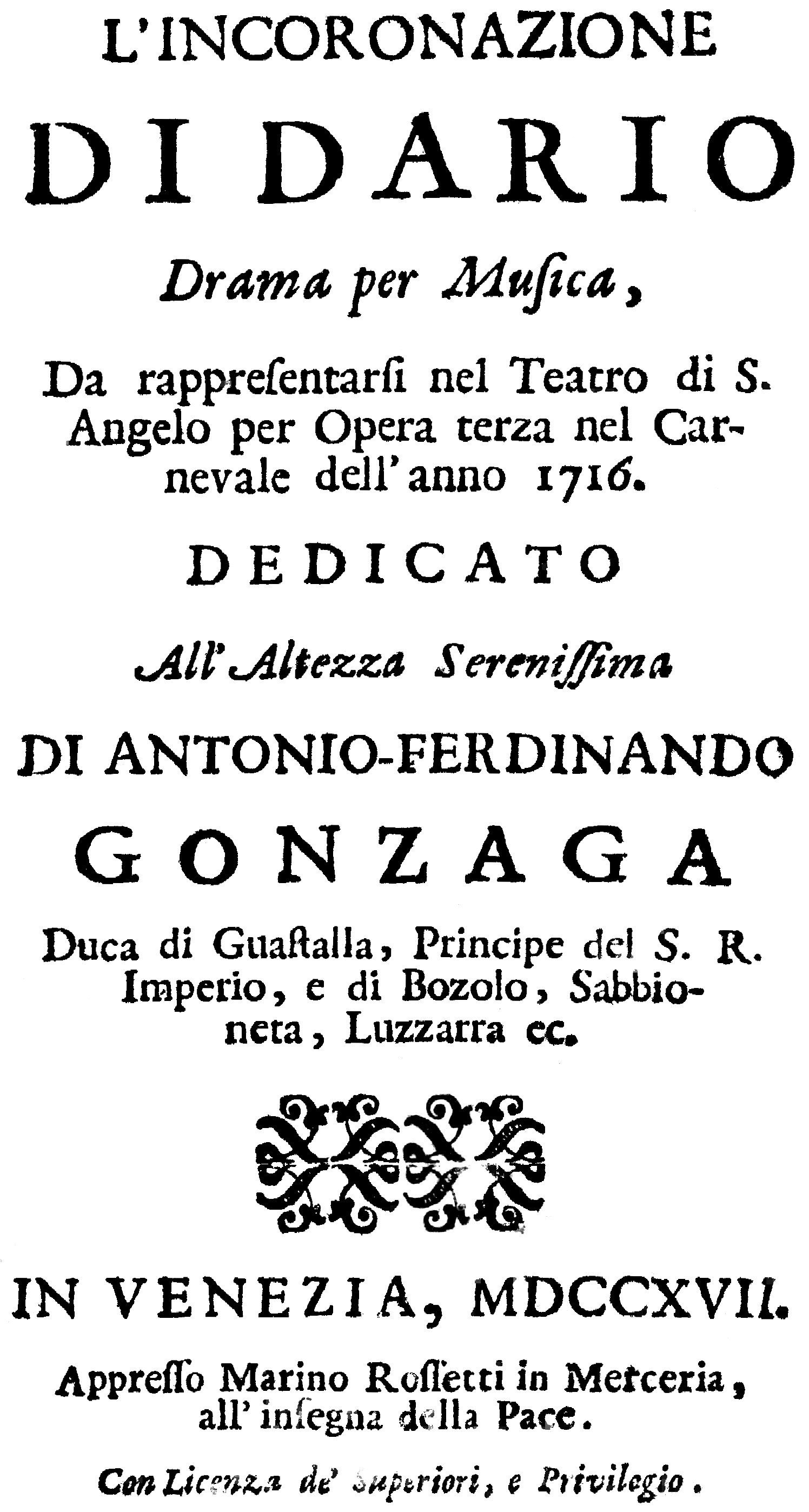
Title page of L'incoronazione di Dario

L'incoronazione di Dario (transl. "The Coronation of Darius") (RV 719) is a dramma per musica by Antonio Vivaldi with an Italian libretto by Adriano Morselli. The opera was first performed at the Teatro Sant'Angelo in Venice on 23 January 1717.

== Roles ==
Roles, voice types, premiere cast
| Role | Voice type | Premiere cast 23 January 1717 |
|---|---|---|
| Flora | contralto | Rosa Mignati |
| Arpago | soprano (en travesti) | Antonia Pellizzari |
| Oronte | soprano castrato | Carlo Cristini |
| Alinda | soprano | Maria Teresa Cotti |
| Niceno | bass | Angelo Zannoni |
| Argene | contralto | Anna Maria Fabbri |
| Statira | contralto | Anna Vincenza Dotti |
| Dario | tenor | Annibale Pio Fabri |

== Recordings ==
- 1986 John Elwes, Gérard Lesne, Henri Ledroit, Michel Verschaeve, Ensemble Baroque de Nice dir. Gilbert Bezzina. Harmonia Mundi. HMA 1901235-37.
- 2014 Anders J. Dahlin, Sara Mingardo, Delphine Galou, Riccardo Novaro, Accademia Bizantia. Ottavio Dantone. Naïve Records. B00IGD7OE8.
