= François Doubin =

French politician (1933–2019)

Mayor of Argentan
- In office 1989–2001
- Preceded by: Jean de Vimal du Bouchet
- Succeeded by: Pierre Pavis

President of the Radical Party of the Left
- In office 1985–1988
- Preceded by: Jean-Michel Baylet
- Succeeded by: Yvon Collin

Personal details
- Born: 23 April 1933 Paris, France
- Died: 18 June 2019 (aged 86) Saint-Ouen-de-Sécherouvre, France
- Resting place: Soligny-la-Trappe
- Party: PRG
- Education: ÉNA

François Doubin (April 23, 1933 – June 18, 2019) was a French politician and cabinet minister. He was a member and leader of the Radical Party of the Left.

President of the Left Radical Movement (MRG) between 1985 and 1988, he became Delegate Minister for Commerce and Handicrafts and later Delegate Minister for Crafts, Commerce and Consumers in the Michel Rocard government between 1988 and 1992.

He was Mayor of Argentan between 1989 and 2001 and Lower Normandy regional councillor between 1998 and 2004.
