= Saint-Ouen-de-Sécherouvre =

- Commune
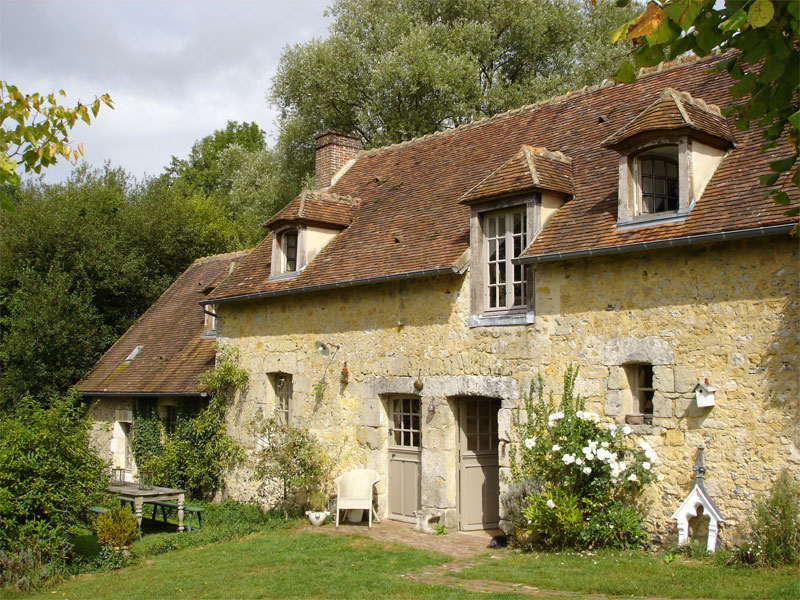
- La Pleugère mill in Saint-Ouen-de-Sécherouvre
- Location of Saint-Ouen-de-Sécherouvre
- Location within France Location within Normandy
- Coordinates: 48°36′05″N 0°29′25″E
- Country: France
- Region: Normandy
- Department: Orne
- Arrondissement: Mortagne-au-Perche
- Canton: Mortagne-au-Perche
- Intercommunality: Pays de Mortagne-au-Perche

Government
  - Mayor (2020–2026): Rémy Gohier
- Area^{1}: 10.15 km^{2} (3.92 sq mi)
- Elevation: 206 m (676 ft)
- Highest elevation: 257 m (843 ft)
- Lowest elevation: 173 m (568 ft)
- Population (2023): 153
  - Density: 15.1/km^{2} (39.0/sq mi)
- Time zone: UTC+01:00 (CET)
  - Summer (DST): UTC+02:00 (CEST)
- INSEE/Postal code: 61438 /61560
- ^{1} French Land Register data, which excludes lakes, ponds, glaciers > 1 km^{2} (0.386 sq mi or 247 acres) and river estuaries.

Saint-Ouen-de-Sécherouvre (French pronunciation: [sɛ̃.t‿wɛ̃ də sɛʃʁuvʁ]) is a commune in the Orne department in north-western France. The bass singer Antoine Sicot was born in Saint-Ouen-de-Sécherouvre.

== Notable people ==
- François Doubin - (1933 – 2019) a French politician and cabinet minister who lived and died here.
- Antoine Sicot - (Born 1953) a contemporary French soloist singer specialising in the baroque repertoire for bass voice was born here.

== See also ==
- Communes of the Orne department
