= John Elwes (tenor) =

John Joseph Elwes (original name John Hahessy) (born 20 October 1946), is an English tenor singer.

Born in Lewisham, London he was Head Chorister in the choir of Westminster Cathedral, London. His musical and vocal education were furthered by the eminent harpsichordist George Malcolm, the then Director of Music. Under the name of John Hahessy (his father was from Carrick-on-Suir, Co. Tipperary, Ireland) he had considerable success as a boy soprano - from BBC broadcasts and recordings with Decca to concerts with such conductors as Benjamin Britten. He made the 1st recording of Benjamin Britten's Canticle "Abraham and Isaac", singing the role of Isaac, accompanied by the composer. Britten later dedicated his "Corpus Christi Carol" to him. He went on to study at the Royal College of Music, and made his stage debut as a tenor in 1968 at The Proms.

John Elwes is particularly well known for his sensitive and musical performances. His repertoire is extensive ranging from Monteverdi, Charpentier, Rameau, Bach and Handel to Mozart, Schubert, Schumann, Mahler and Britten. He regularly performs with the leading conductors of baroque, classical and contemporary music. He has sung in over one hundred recordings, including Dowland's First Book of Ayres, Schubert's song cycles Die Schöne Müllerin and Winterreise, Purcell's The Tempest, Bach's St Matthew Passion and Mass in B minor, Handel's Messiah and Mahler's Das Lied von der Erde, for which he was nominated for a Grammy Award in 2008.

== Selected recordings ==
- Marc-Antoine Charpentier: "Vêpres Solennelles" H.540, H.190, H.50, H.149, H.52, H.150, H.51, H.161, H.191, H.65, H.77, John Elwes, Ian Honeyman, tenors, Agnès Mellon, Brigitte Bellamy, sopranos, Dominique Visse, Jean Nirouet, countertenors, Philippe Cantor, Jacques Bona, baritones, Choeur régional- Nord Pas de Calais, La Grande Écurie et la Chambre du Roy, Odile Bailleux, organ, conducted by Jean-Claude Malgoire (2 CD CBS Sony 1987)

== Sources ==
- Biography: John Elwes, Bach-cantatas.com
