= Capella de la Torre =

Capella de la Torre is a German early music ensemble led by Katharina Bäuml and founded in 2005. In 2016, Katharina Bäuml and Capella de la Torre won the ECHO Klassik Ensemble des Jahres for their CD Water Music. In 2017, Capella de la Torre was awarded again with ECHO Klassik for the CD "Da Pacem" with Rias Kamerchor conducted by Florian Helgath. The ensemble is a wind ensemble, but has enlarged to include singers, lute, organ, and percussion.

== Discography ==
- Mater Matris Christi – Musik aus den Annaberger Chorbüchern, Obrecht: Missa "Sub tuum praesidium" Gesine Adler, David Erler, Stephan Gähler, Sebastian Reim, Capella de la Torre, Katharina Bäuml Coviello Classics 2007
- Stadtpeiffer • Waits • Ministriles • Piffari – Instrumental Music Of The 16th And 17th Century (SACD, Hybrid, Multichannel) Coviello Classics COV 20804 2008
- Feliz Navidad – Mediterrane Weihnachtsmusik der Renaissance, Cecile Kempenaers (soprano), Jose Pizarro, Capella de la Torre, Katharina Bäuml Coviello 2008
- Der Wächter Auf Der Zinne (The Guard On The Battlement) Michael Praetorius, Samuel Scheidt – Dominique Visse Coviello Classics COV 20907 2009
- Johannes Eccard: Geistliche Lieder aus der Sammlung "Preußische Festlieder", Vocal Concert Dresden, Capella de la Torre, Peter Kopp Carus 2011
- Harry Our King – Music For King Henry VIII Tudor Charles Daniels Carpe Diem Records 4032324162924 2012
- Musica Ferdinandea – Ein Fest für Kaiser Ferdinand I., Kai Wessel, Achim Kleinlein, Matthias Gerchen (bass), Capella De La Torre Musik Museum 2013
- Vinum et Musica – Songs & Dances from Nuremberg Sources, Dominique Visse, Capella de la Torre, Katharina Bäuml Challenge 2012
- Luther's Wedding Day, Capella De La Torre, Katharina Bäuml Challenge 2013
- Piffarissimo – Instrumental Music At The Council Of Constance 1414–1418 Challenge Classics, SWR2 CC72631 2014
- Resonanzen 2014 "Querköpfe", Hiro Kurosaki, Paolo Grazzi, Eyal Streett, Andrew Ackerman, Collegium Vocale 1704, La Capilla, Ensemble Arte Musica, Capella de la Torre, Phantasm, Ensemble Unicorn, Collegium 1704, Concerto Copenhagen, ORF
- Renaissance goes Jazz, Markus Becker (piano), Michel Godard (serpent, tuba, e-bass); Capella de la Torre, Katharina Bäuml DreyerGaido, 2013
- Das Treffen in Telgte oder Dient die Poeterey der Musik?, Günter Grass, Helene Grass, RIAS Kammerchor, Capella de la Torre, Katharina Bäuml DreyerGaido, 2014
- Music für Kaiser Karl V. Matthias Gerchen (bass), Capella de la Torre Coviello 2016
- Ein musikalisches Gipfeltreffen 1503 – Höfische Musik aus der Zeit Kaiser Maximilians I., Kai Wessel, Bernd-Oliver Fröhlich, Harry van Berne, Matthias Lutze, Wiltener Sängerknaben, Capella de la Torre, Katharina Bäuml. Musik Museum 2017
- New Eyes on Martin Luther Jeanette Köhn, Magnus Lindgren, Nils Landgren, Eva Kruse, Johan Norberg, Capella de la Torre, Knabenchor Hannover ACT 2017
- Ein Kindlein in der Wiegen – Weihnachten zur Lutherzeit, dhm 2013
- Isabella – Music for a Queen dhm 2014
- Johann Staden: 15 Motetten, Hana Blazikova, Alex Potter, Satoshi Mizukoshi, Dominik Wörner, Windsbacher Knabenchor, Concerto Palatino, Capella de la Torre, Martin Lehmann, dhm 2015
- Ciaconna Deutsche Harmonia Mundi, dhm 2015
- Water Music: Tales Of Nymphs And Sirens dhm 88875062002 2015
- Fire Music: Infernal Flames and Celestial Blaze dhm 88985360302 2016
- Da Pacem RIAS Kammerchor & Capella de la Torre Katharina Bäuml, Florian Helgath dhm 2016
- Una serata venexiana dhm 2017
