= Gilbert Bezzina =

French violinist and conductor

Gilbert Bezzina is a French violinist and conductor of baroque opera.

== Early life and education ==
Gilbert Bezzina studied violin at the Conservatory of Nice and continues to perform and record as a violinist.

== Career ==
In 1965 he founded the Société de Musique Ancienne de Nice, and in 1982 the Ensemble Baroque de Nice, with which he has presented, and in some cases recorded, a series of revivals of baroque operas.

== Credits ==
A selection of Bezzina's major opera revivals include:

- Vivaldi's L'incoronazione di Dario: Gérard Lesne, Henri Ledroit, Dominique Visse, Michel Verschaeve, Isabelle Poulenard, dir. Gilbert Bezzina, recorded for Harmonia Mundi.
- 2003 Vivaldi's Rosmira fedele, Opéra de Nice.
- 2007 Handel's Teseo at the Opéra de Nice.

Bezzina also has revived oratorios:

- In 2007 Bezzina premiered a little-known second setting by Alessandro Scarlatti of La Giuditta in a mise en espace by Gilbert Blin.
- 2009 Alessandro Scarlatti: Agar et Ismaele esiliati.
