= Ensemble Organum =

Musical ensemble

- Origin: Sénanque Abbey
- Genres: Early music
- Years active: 1982–present
- Labels: Harmonia Mundi
- Members: Marcel Pérès

Ensemble Organum is a group performing early music, co-founded in 1982 by Marcel Pérès and based in France. Its members have changed, but have included at one time or another, Josep Cabré, Josep Benet, Gérard Lesne, Antoine Sicot, Malcolm Bothwell. They have often collaborated with Lycourgos Angelopoulos and are influenced by Orthodox music.

The group mainly focuses on the performance of music from the Middle Ages, including Beneventan, Old Roman, Gallican, Carolingian and Mozarabic chants. However, the repertoire includes renaissance polyphony as well as more recent works.

The ensemble was formerly based at Sénanque Abbey and Royaumont Abbey. Since 2001 it has shared facilities in the precinct of Moissac Abbey with the Centre itinérant de recherche sur les musiques anciennes (Centre for Itinerant Research of Medieval and Early Music). In addition to musical performance, the ensemble also works with musicologists and historians on musical research from this period.

== Discography ==
The following recordings were mainly released by Harmonia Mundi.

- Polyphonie aquitaine du XIIe siècle: St. Martial de Limoges (1984)
- Messe du Jour de Noel (École de Notre-Dame) (1985)
- Chants de l'Église de Rome des VIIe et VIIIe siècles: période byzantine (1986)
- Josquin Desprez: Missa Pange lingua (1986)
- Codex Chantilly: airs de cour du XIVe siècle (1987)
- Corsica: Chants polyphoniques (1987)
- François Couperin: Messe a l'usage ordinaire des paroisses (1987)
- Chants de l'Église Milanaise (1989)
- Carmina Burana: Le Mystère de la Passion (XIIIe siècle) (1990)
- Plain-chant Cathedrale d'Auxerre (1990)
- Le jeu des pèlerins d'Emmaüs: drame liturgique du XIIe siècle (1990)
- Messe de Tournai (1991)
- Codex Faenza - Selections (1991)
- Palestrina: Missa Viri Galilaei (1992)
- Chant Cistercien (1992)
- Graduel d'Aliénor de Bretagne (1993)
- Messe de Saint Marcel (1992)
- Ockeghem: Requiem (1993)
- Chant de la Cathedrale de Benevento (1993)
- Plain-Chant Parisien: XVIIe et XVIIIe siecles (1994)
- Chant Corse: Manuscrits franciscains des XVIIe-XVIIIe siècles (1994)
- Chant Mozarabe: Cathédrale de Tolède (XVe siècle) (1995)
- École Notre Dame: Messe de la Nativité de la Vierge (1995)
- Laudario di Cortona: Un mystère du XIIIe siècle (1996)
- Guillaume de Machaut: La Messe de Nostre Dame (1996)
- Hildegard von Bingen: Laudes de Sainte Ursule (1997)
- Chants de l'église de Rome - Vêpres (1998)
- Compostela ad Vesperas Sancti Iacobi: Codex Calixtinus (2004)
- Ad vesperas Sancti Ludovici Regis Franciæ (2005)
- Le chant des Templiers (2006)
- Incarnatio Verbi: Chant de L'Église de Rome (2008)
- Missa Gotica - XIV siècle (2009)
- Lux Perpetua/Requiem (2012)

== See also ==
- Organum
