= Monique Zanetti =

French soprano (born 1961)

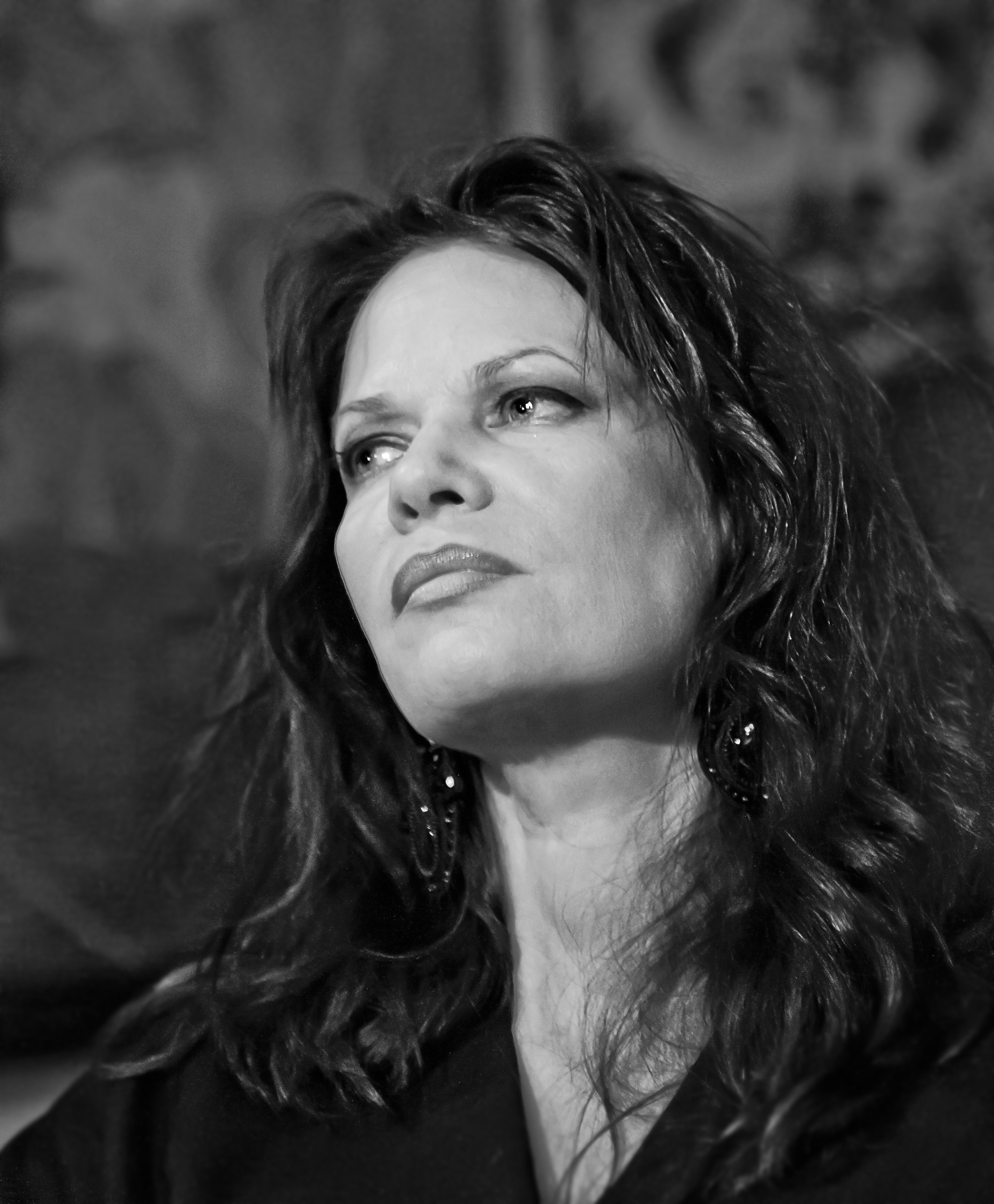
Monique Zanetti

Monique Zanetti (born 13 June 1961) is a French soprano. She studied at the University of Metz, then with Elisabeth Grümmer. She first came to attention singing in the same first generation of French early music singers with Agnès Mellon and Gérard Lesne.
