= Paschal de l'Estocart =

French Renaissance composer

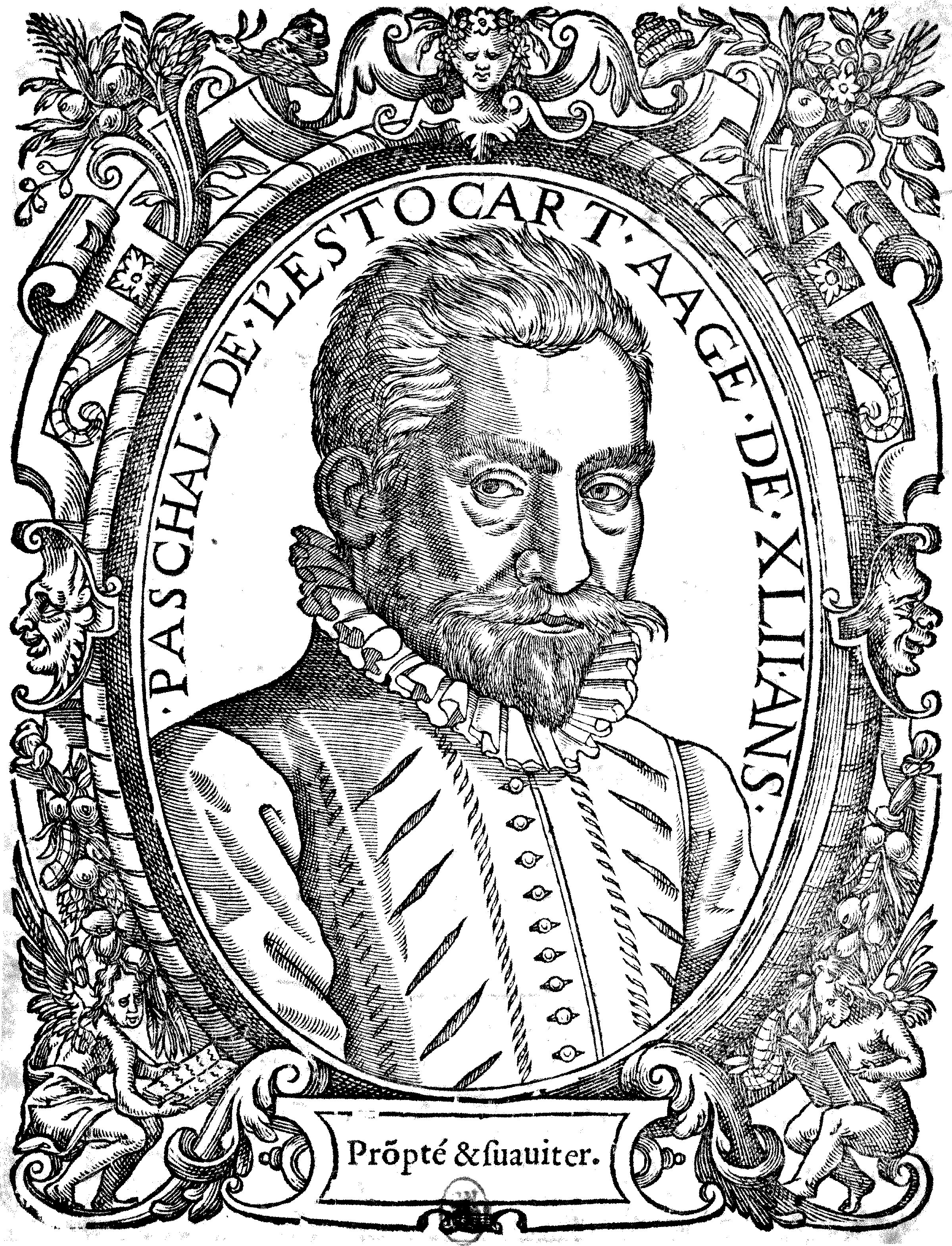

Paschal de l'Estocart (1538 or 1539 – after 1587) was a French Renaissance composer.

Not much of his life is known. He was born in Noyon, was in Lyons between 1559 and 1565, and was married in the latter year. In his youth he is known to have visited Italy, but the exact years are not known. He was the protégé of the protestant Seigneurs (Lords) de la Marck and in 1582 he worked for Charles III, Duke of Lorraine. In 1584 he was in the service of the Abbot of Valmont; also that year he won the harpe d'argent (the silver harp) on the musical competition (called a "Puy") at Evreux, for his five-voice motet Ecce quam bonum et quam jucundum. His works show that he belonged to the Huguenot circles of his days.

His style of composing is considered to be quite innovative.

== Publications ==
(Selection)

- 126 Quatrains du Sieur de Pibrac, 1582
- Livres des Octonaires de la Vanité du Monde, 1582
- Sacrae Cantiones, 1582
- 150 Pseaumes de David..., 1583 (for 4, 5, 6, 7 and 8 voices)

- given in reprint by Pierre Pidoux and Hans Holliger in 1954 (Bärenreiter-Verlag).

== Sources ==
Edith Wéber, La musique protestante de langue française, 1979
