= La Grande Écurie et la Chambre du Roy =

La Grande Écurie et la Chambre du Roy (lit. 'The Grand Stable and the King's Chamber') is a French musical ensemble, based in Tourcoing, France, that performs using period instruments. The group was founded in 1966 by Jean-Claude Malgoire and led by him until his death in April 2018. Alexis Kossenko, flautist and conductor, was named music director of the group in October 2019. While the ensemble has performed a wide repertoire from a variety of musical periods, the group has drawn particular acclaim for their performances of baroque music and the works of Wolfgang Amadeus Mozart. The group has toured five continents and has made more than 100 recordings. The ensemble's recording of Antonio Vivaldi's Motezuma was awarded the Victoires de la musique classique in 1992. Their recording of Vivaldi's Vêpres pour la Nativité de la Vierge won the Grand Prix du Disque. The ensemble is supported financially by the France's Ministry of Culture and the city of Tourcoing.

== Discography ==
- Live video recording - 2004 - Claudio Monteverdi - L'Orfeo - Théâtre Municipal de Tourcoing - Jean-Claude Malgoire (Conductor)
  Cast: Kobie van Rensburg, Cyrille Gerstenhaber, Philippe Jaroussky, Bernard Deletré - Dynamic Cat. 33477, DVD
- Vivaldi The Four Seasons - 1980 - Claudio Monteverdi- Jean-Claude Malgoire (Conductor)
  Violin Solo: John Holloway - Columbia Odyssey Cat. Y35930, Vinyl
