= Jill Feldman =

American soprano (born 1952)

Jill Feldman (born 21 April 1952 in Los Angeles) is an American soprano who has acquired an international reputation for her interpretation of medieval, baroque and classical repertoires.

== Training ==
Feldman obtained her musical diploma at the University of California at Santa Barbara.

She perfected her skills with Lillian Loran in San Francisco and Nicole Fallien in Paris, and in 1980 received an "Alfred Hertz Scholarship" to perfect her interpretation of early music under the direction of Andrea von Ramm in Basel.

== Career ==
As soon as she finished her studies, Jill Feldman took part successively in three prestigious productions: she appeared as La Musica in a production of Monteverdi's l'Orfeo, directed by Philip Brett at Berkeley in California, as Clerio in Cavalli's Erismena at Spoleto (Italy), and played a role in Ordo Virtutum by Hildegard von Bingen during a tour of the ensemble "Sequentia".

In 1981, at the request of her countryman William Christie, she joined in Paris the baroque ensemble Les Arts Florissants which then was the spearhead of the "baroqueux" movement. With this famous ensemble, she played the title role of Charpentier's Médée. Its recording for the label Harmonia Mundi won the Gramophone Classical Music Awards in 1985, also the Prize of the Académie Charles Cros and the Grand Prix du Disque de Montreux. Afterwards, Feldman recorded two discs with the Philharmonia Baroque Orchestra under the direction of Nicholas McGegan in works by Handel, the cantata Clori, Tirsi e Fileno, and the oratorio Susanna (Harmonia Mundi USA). Later, she joined the Mala Punica medieval ensemble, with which she recorded five projects for Arcana and Erato.

Feldman was then invited by several conductors of the baroque repertoire. She performed under the direction of Frans Brüggen (Haydn's Die Schöpfung), Andrew Parrott (Les Vêpres des Carmélites by Handel at EMI), Jordi Savall (Motets by Delalande), René Jacobs (Cesti's Orontea and Cavalli's Xerse at Harmonia Mundi). She played the role of Armida in Alessandro Stradella's Lo Schiavo Liberato at the Théâtre de Modène and the Festival of Liège, as well as the title role in La Vita Humana by Marazzoli at the Tramway of Glasgow. In the field of contemporary music, she performed at the Villa Medici in Rome, the Church of Santa Maria della Grazia in Milan, and the Ysbreker Festival in Amsterdam.

== Teaching ==
Feldman has been teaching at the Royal Conservatory of The Hague in the Netherlands, at the Music and Theatre College in Zurich, and at the Amici della Musica in Florence and the Accademia di musiga antiga of Portugal. She gives master classes all over Europe, the United States, Japan and South Korea.

== Discography ==
=== With Les Arts Florissants ===
- 1981
  - Pastorale sur la Naissance de N.S. Jésus-Christ H.483 by Marc-Antoine Charpentier
  - Les surprises de l'Amour by Jean-Philippe Rameau
- 1982
  - In nativitatem Domini Nostri Jesu Christi canticum (In Nativitatem D.N.J.C. Canticum) H.414 by Charpentier
  - Oratorios (Un peccator pentito, O Cecità del misero mortale) by Luigi Rossi
  - Les Arts Florissants H.487 by Charpentier
  - Antienne "O" de l'Avent by Charpentier
- 1983
  - Il ballo delle ingrate and La Sestina by Claudio Monteverdi
  - In Nativitatem Domini Canticum H.416 by Charpentier
  - Pastorale sur la Naissance de Notre Seigneur Jésus-Christ H.482 by Charpentier
- 1984
  - Médée by Charpentier
  - Airs de cour (1689) by Michel Lambert
- 1986: Dido and Aeneas by Purcell (Belinda)
- 1986: Cantates françaises (Arion, La Dispute de l'Amour et de l'Hymen, Les Femmes, Enée et Didon) by André Campra
- 1987: Selva morale e spirituale by Monteverdi
- 1989: Oratorio per la Settimana Santa by Rossi

=== Other recordings ===
- 1983: Motets by François Couperin, with Isabelle Poulenard, Gregory Reinhart, Davitt Moroney, Jaap Ter Linden
- 1988: Œuvres pour le Port-Royal by Charpentier, with Greta De Reyghere, Isabelle Poulenard, Bernard Foccroulle and the Ricercar Consort
- 1991: Udite Amanti: 17th Century Italian Love Songs, with Nigel North (theorbo and archlute)
- 1992: Orpheus Britannicus (Ayres & Songs) by Purcell, with Nigel North (archlute) and Sarah Cunningham (viol)
- 1994: Ars Subtilis Ytalica, with Mala Punica
- 1995: D'Amor ragionando, Ballades du neo-Stilnovo en Italie, 1380-1415, with Mala Punica
- 1996: En attendant. L'art de la citation dans l'Italie des Visconti, 1380-1410, with Mala Punica
- 1997: Missa cantilena, Contrafactures liturgiques en Italie, 1380-1410, with Mala Punica
- 1999: Hélas Avril. Les chansons de Matteo da Perugia, with Mala Punica
- 2001: Harmonia Sacra; Complete Organ Music by Purcell, with Davitt Moroney (organ)
- 2002: Pianger Di Dolcezza, vocal works by Giulio Caccini and Sigismondo d'India, with Karl-Ernst Schröder (chitarrone) and Mara Galassi (harp)
- 2003: Monografia, compositions by Kees Boeke
- 2003: Trecento, with Kees Boeke (flustes and vielle)
- 2004: Musiche sacre e morali by Domenico Mazzocchi, with Orlanda Velez Isidro (soprano) and Kenneth Weiss (chromatic harpsichord and organ)
- 2004: Ténèbres by Charpentier, François Couperin and Michel-Richard de Lalande, with Kenneth Weiss (harpsichord) and Rainer Zipperling (viol)
- 2005: Consort Songs by William Byrd and His Contemporaries, with the ensemble Concerto delle Viole, Roberto Gini
- 2006: Guillaume Dufay, Chansons, with the Ensemble Tetraktys.
- 2007: Songs by Charles Ives, with Jeannette Koekkoek (piano)
- 2008: Codex Chantilly Vol. 1, with the Ensemble Tetraktys

== Operatic roles ==
- Médée by Marc-Antoine Charpentier (title role)
- La Musica and Proserpina in l'Orfeo by Monteverdi
- Minerva in Il ritorno d'Ulisse in patria by Monteverdi
- The great priestess in Anacréon by Jean-Philippe Rameau
- La vita umana by Marco Marazzoli (title role)
- Adelanta in Xerse by Cavalli
- Clerio in l'Erismena by Cavalli
- Armida in Lo Schiavo liberato by Alessandro Stradella
- Belinda in Dido and Aeneas by Purcell
- Donna Anna in Don Giovanni by Mozart
- Silvia in Ascanio in Alba by Mozart
- Arthébuze in Actéon by Charpentier
- The aunt in Mariken in de tuin der Lusten by Calliope Tsoupaki
