= Luigi Rossi =

Italian Baroque composer (c. 1597–1653)

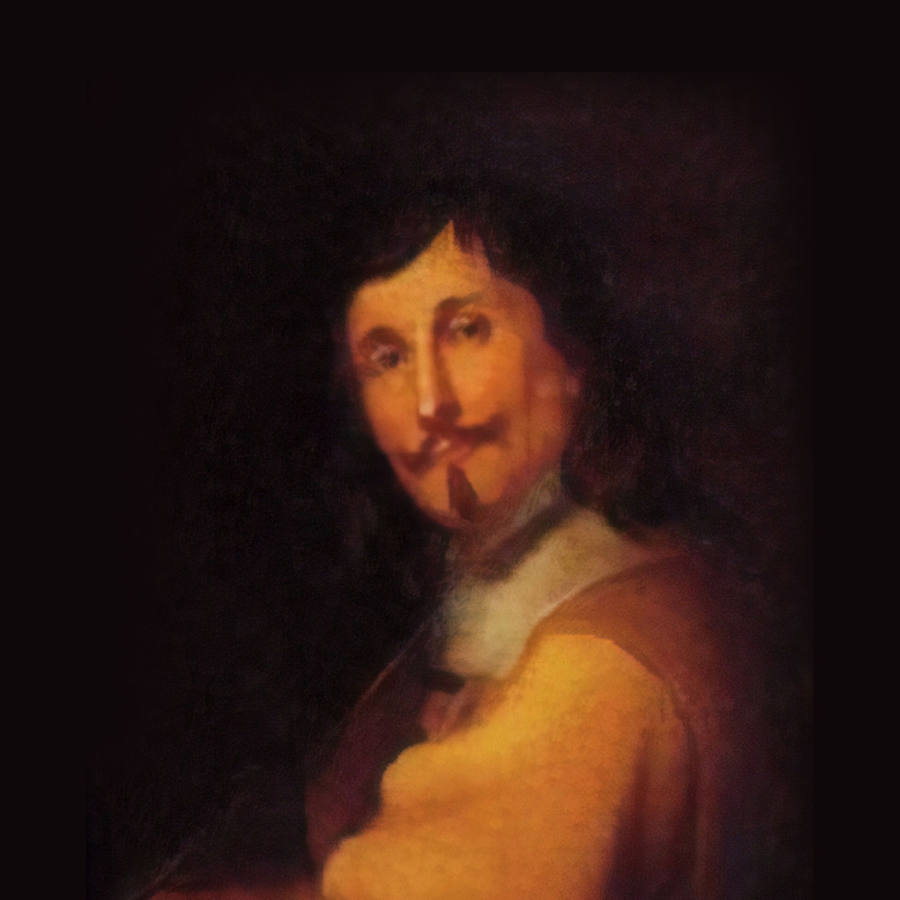
Luigi Rossi (1597–1653)

Luigi Rossi (c. 1597 – 20 February 1653) was an Italian Baroque composer. Born in Torremaggiore, a small town near Foggia, in the ancient Kingdom of Naples, at an early age he went to Naples where he studied music with the Franco-Flemish composer Jean de Macque, organist of the Santa Casa dell’Annunziata and maestro di cappella to the Spanish viceroy. Rossi later entered the service of the Caetani, dukes of Traetta.

== Life ==
Rossi composed two operas: Il palazzo incantato, which was given at Rome in 1642; and Orfeo, written after he was invited by Cardinal Mazarin in 1646 to go to Paris for that purpose and given its premiere there in 1647. Rossi returned to France in 1648 hoping to write another opera, but no production was possible because the court had sought refuge outside Paris. Rossi returned to Rome by 1650 and never attempted anything more for the stage.

A collection of cantatas published in 1646 describes him as a musician to Cardinal Antonio Barberini, while Giacomo Antonio Perti in 1688 speaks of him along with Carissimi and Cesti as "the three greatest lights of our profession."

Rossi is noteworthy principally for his chamber-cantatas, which are among the finest that the 17th century produced. A large number of the 300 he left are in manuscripts in the British Library and in Christ Church Library, Oxford. La Gelosia, printed by F. A. Gevaert in Les Gloires d'Italie, is an admirable specimen.
