= Jean-Claude Malgoire =

French oboist and conductor (1940–2018)

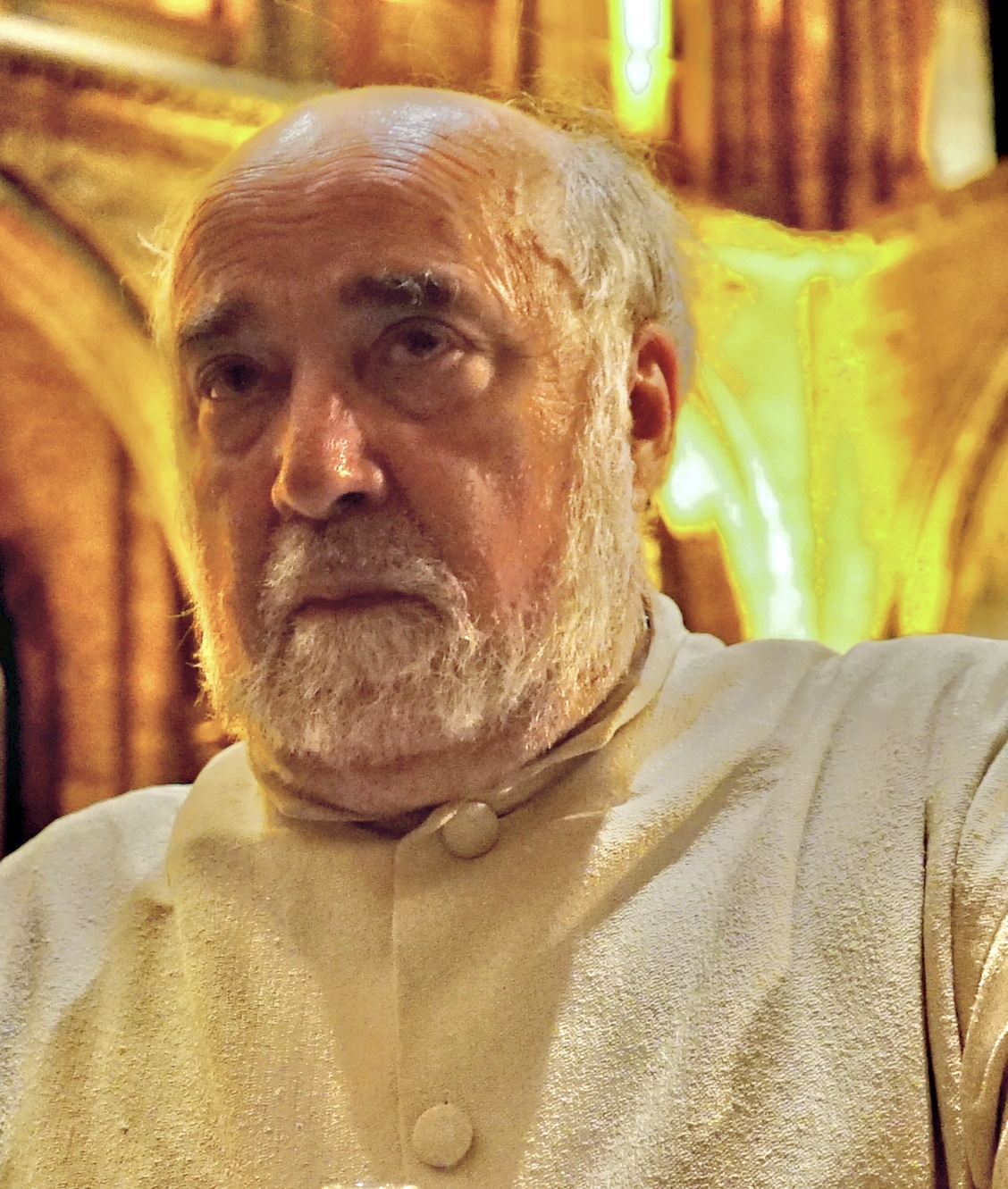
Malgoire in 2015

Jean-Claude Malgoire (25 November 1940 – 14 April 2018) was a French oboist and later conductor.

== Early life ==
Malgoire was born on 25 November 1940 in Avignon, France. His father was a warehousman and mother was born in Italy.

He began his musical journey at the Conservatoire d’Avignon. At 16, he moved to paris and admitted to Paris Conservatory, where he obtained a first prize in oboe and chamber music. After completing his studies, he began his career as an instrumentalist.

Malgoire graduated from the Paris Conservatory.

== Career ==
Malgoire began his career as an oboist. He played the cor anglais for the Orchestre de Paris, under the direction of conductor Charles Munch. Over the course of his career, he played for conductors Herbert von Karajan, Georg Solti and Seiji Ozawa. In 1971, he played the cor anglais in Ravel's Piano Concerto alongside pianist Samson François, conducted by André Cluytens. He also played the cor anglais in Richard Wagner's Tristan und Isolde.

Malgoire founded La Grande Écurie et la Chambre du Roy, a period-instrument Baroque music ensemble, in 1966. He played the works of Jean-Baptiste Lully, Marc-Antoine Charpentier, André Campra, and Jean-Philippe Rameau. He also founded the Florilegium Musicum de Paris, a medieval music group. In 1972, he joined Ensemble 2e2m founded by Paul Méfano. He was the artistic director of the Atelier lyrique in Tourcoing from 1981 to 2018.

Malgoire was awarded the Victoires de la Musique in 1992.

== Awards / Distinctions ==
- Gold record in 1986 at Paul Bocuse's restaurant on the occasion of the 20th anniversary of La Grande Écurie et la Chambre du Roy
- Victoires de la musique classique 1993 for the recording of Vivaldi 's Montezuma, Florence Malgoire (solo violin), CD 1992
- Honorary Music Award 2003

== Death ==
Malgoire died on 14 April 2018 in 14th arrondissement of Paris.
