= Michel Lambert =

French singer, theorbist, and composer

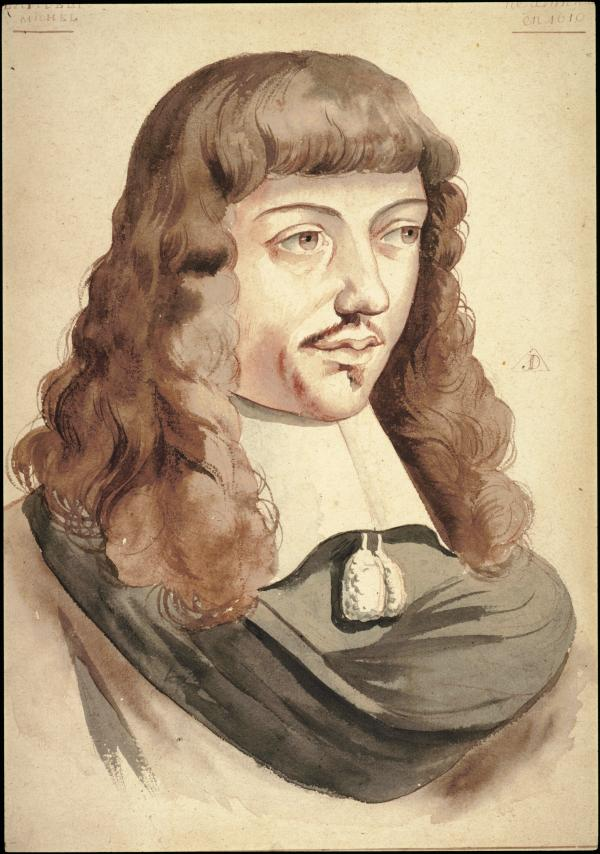
- 17th-century watercolor, purportedly a portrait of Lambert
- Born: 1610; Champigny-sur-Veude, Poitou, France
- Died: June 29, 1696 (aged 85–86); Paris, France
- Education: Chapel of Gaston d'Orléans
- Occupations: Singer, theorbist, composer
- Spouse: Gabrielle Dupuis (m. 1641-1642)
- Children: 1
- Family: Jean-Baptiste Lully (son in-law)

Michel Lambert (1610 – 29 June 1696) was a French singer, theorbist, and composer.

== Career ==
Lambert was born at Champigny-sur-Veude, Poitou, France. He received his musical education as an altar boy at the Chapel of Gaston d'Orléans, a brother of king Louis XIII. He studied also with Pierre de Nyert in Paris. Since 1636, he was known as a singing teacher. In 1641, he married singer Gabrielle Dupuis who died suddenly a year later. Their daughter Madeleine (1643–1720) married Jean-Baptiste Lully in 1662. After his marriage, Lambert's career became closely linked to his sister-in-law and famous singer Hilaire Dupuis (1625–1709).

In 1651, he appears as a ballet dancer at the court of Louis XIV. Beginning in 1656, his reputation as a composer was established and his compositions were regularly printed by Ballard. They consist mainly of airs on poems of Benserade and Quinault. He was the most prolific composer of airs in the second half of the 17th century. In 1661, he succeeded Jean de Cambefort as a "Maître de musique de la chambre du roi" and kept this position until his death. In that time, Lully was the "Surintendant de la musique de la chambre du roi" (from 1661) and Master of Music of the royal family (from 1662).

Lambert's role as a singing master ("Maître de chant") and composer of dramatic airs contributed to the creation of French tragédie lyrique. As a singing master, he enjoyed a reputation attested by many testimonies of his time (including singers Anne de La Barre, Pierre Perrin, and La Cerf of Viéville). Titon du Tillet mentions concerts given at his house in Puteaux, during which Lambert accompanied himself on the theorbo. He also collaborated with Lully in the creation of several ballets (e.g. Ballet des amours déguisés).

He died in Paris, France.

== Works ==
- Airs du sieur Lambert, Paris, Charles de Sercy (1658)
- Les Airs de Monsineur Lambert, 19 airs with doubles, for two voices and basso continuo, Paris (1660)
- Airs de Monsieur Lambert non imprimez, manuscript, Paris (c. 1692)
- Pièces en trio pour les violons, flûtes ou hautbois, Amsterdam, Estienne Roger (1700)
- 75 airs de Monsieur Lambert (manuscript) (50 with doubles), for a voice and basso continuo (c. 1710)
- Leçons de ténèbres pour voix et basse continue manuscript (1662-1663) - recorded by Marc Mauillon 2017
- Leçons de ténèbres pour voix et basse continue manuscript (1689) - recorded by Piveteau
- 60 airs for 1-5 voices, two instruments and basso continuo, Paris (1689)
- Miserere mei Deus for 2-3 voices and basso continuo, manuscript
