= Michel Laplénie =

French opera singer

Michel Laplénie (born 1943) is a French tenor, and conductor of the baroque choral Ensemble Sagittarius (founded 1986) and other ensembles. He was one of the founding members of both Ensemble Clément Janequin and Les Arts Florissants.
