= Gérard Lesne =

French countertenor (born 1956)

Gérard Lesne (French pronunciation: [ʒeʁaʁ lɛn]; born 15 July 1956) is a French countertenor. He is also the founder and artistic director of the baroque music ensemble, Il Seminario Musicale.

== Life and career ==
Gérard Lesne was born in Montmorency, Val-d'Oise. He was originally a rock singer, but in 1979 the tenor Zeger Vandersteene introduced him to René Clemencic, a pioneer of work in the medieval repertoire, and at age 23, Lesne began touring with the Clemencic Consort.

Lesne has made more than 70 recordings and has appeared as a soloist at numerous opera houses and music festivals including the Opéra de Paris, Théâtre des Champs-Elysées, La Fenice, Opéra National de Lyon, Théâtre du Châtelet, Teatro San Carlo, Aix-en-Provence Festival, Utrecht Early Music Festival, and Boston Early Music Festival. Since 1993, Gérard Lesne has taught annual courses in vocal interpretation at Royaumont Abbey in France.

In 2004, Gerard Lesne was made Chevalier des Arts et des Lettres by the French government, and received the Académie Charles Cros in honorem prize for his career. His voice is described as full-bodied.

== Selected discography ==
- 1979 : Cantigas de Santa Maria, with Alia Musica, on PolyGram.
- 1980 : Gilles Binchois : chansons, missa Ferialis, Magnificat, with Clemencic Consort, on Musique en Wallonie.
- 1986 : Cantate Italiane e Sonata, by Antonio Vivaldi, with Fabio Biondi on violin solo and Il Seminario Musicale, Diapason d'Or award, on Adda. Re-released by Musidisc in 2001.
- 1991 : Cantatas, by Antonio Caldara, on Virgin Classics. Re-released in 1999.
- 1992 : O Lusitano, by various Portuguese composers, on Virgin Classics.
- 1992 : Salve Regina, by Vivaldi, with Fabio Biondi and Il Seminario Musicale, Diapason d'Or award, Virgin
- 1993 : Marc-Antoine Charpentier - Leçons de Ténèbres - Office du Vendredi Saint, H.105, H.95, H.140, H.133, H.130, H.99, H.100, A. Mellon, G. Lesne, I. Honeyman, J. Bona, Il Seminario Musicale - Virgin Classics, CD 7592952 (p 1992 c 1993)
- 1995 : Motets, by Alessandro Stradella, with Sandrine Piau and Il Seminario Musicale, on Virgin Classics. Re-released in 1999 with the cantatas of Antonio Caldara.
- 1995 : Marc-Antoine Charpentier - Leçons de ténèbres - Office du Mercredi Saint, H.120, H.138, H.141, H.117, H.131, H.126, Miserere H.173 - C. Greuillet, C. Pelon, C. Purves, G. Lesne, Il Seminario Musicale - Virgin Classics, CD 5451072 (p 1995 c 1995).
- 1995 : Marc-Antoine Charpentier - Leçons de Ténèbres - Office du Jeudi Saint, H.121, H.139, H.136, H.144, H.128, H.528, H.510, H.521 - I. Honeyman, P. Harvey, S. Piau, G. Lesne, Il Seminario Musicale - Virgin Classics, CD 5450752 (p 1995 c 1995)
- 1997 : Marc-Antoine Charpentier - David et Jonathas H.490, with Les Arts Florissants, conducted by William Christie. 3 CD Harmonia Mundi
- 2000 : Marc-Antoine Charpentier - Trois histoires sacrées, Mors Saülis et Jonathae H.403, Sacrificium Abrahae, H.402, In Circumcisione Domini / Dialogus inter Angelum et pastores, H.406, M. L. Duthoit, J. Azzaretti, G. Lesne, B. Clee, J . F. Novelli, N. Bauchau, R. Nédélec, R. Spogis Naïve, CD E 8821 (2000)
- 2001 : Carmina Burana, by Carl Orff, with L'Orchestre du Capitole de Toulouse, with Natalie Dessay, Thomas Hampson, Michel Plasson
- 2002 : Arias et cantates, by the Bachs, with Il Seminario Musicale, conducted by Gérard Lesne
- 2002 : Cantates BWV21 et BWV42, by Bach, with Collegium Vocale Gent, La Chapelle Royale, conducted by Philippe Herreweghe
- 2002 : Stabat Mater, by Giovanni Battista Pergolesi, with Il Seminario Musicale and Véronique Gens, conducted by Gérard Lesne
- 2003 : Ô Solitude, by Henry Purcell, with Il Seminario Musicale, conducted by Gérard Lesne
- 2005 : Human?, with Shazz and Massa (CD), on Naïve
- 2006 : Salve Regina, by Antonio Vivaldi, with Il Seminario Musicale, conducted by Gérard Lesne
- 2007 : Marc-Antoine Charpentier : Orphée descendant aux enfers H.471, Epitaphium Carpentarii H.474, douze Airs sérieux et à boire, Tristes déserts H.469, H.467, H.455, H.445, H.463, H.456, .461, H.450, H.446, H.470, H.448, H.466 et les Stances du Cid H.457 H.458 H.459, Il Seminario Musicale, Gérard Lesne, Cyril Auvity, Edwin Crossley-Mercer. CD Zig-Zag territoires.
