= Gregory Reinhart =

American bass opera singer (born 1951)

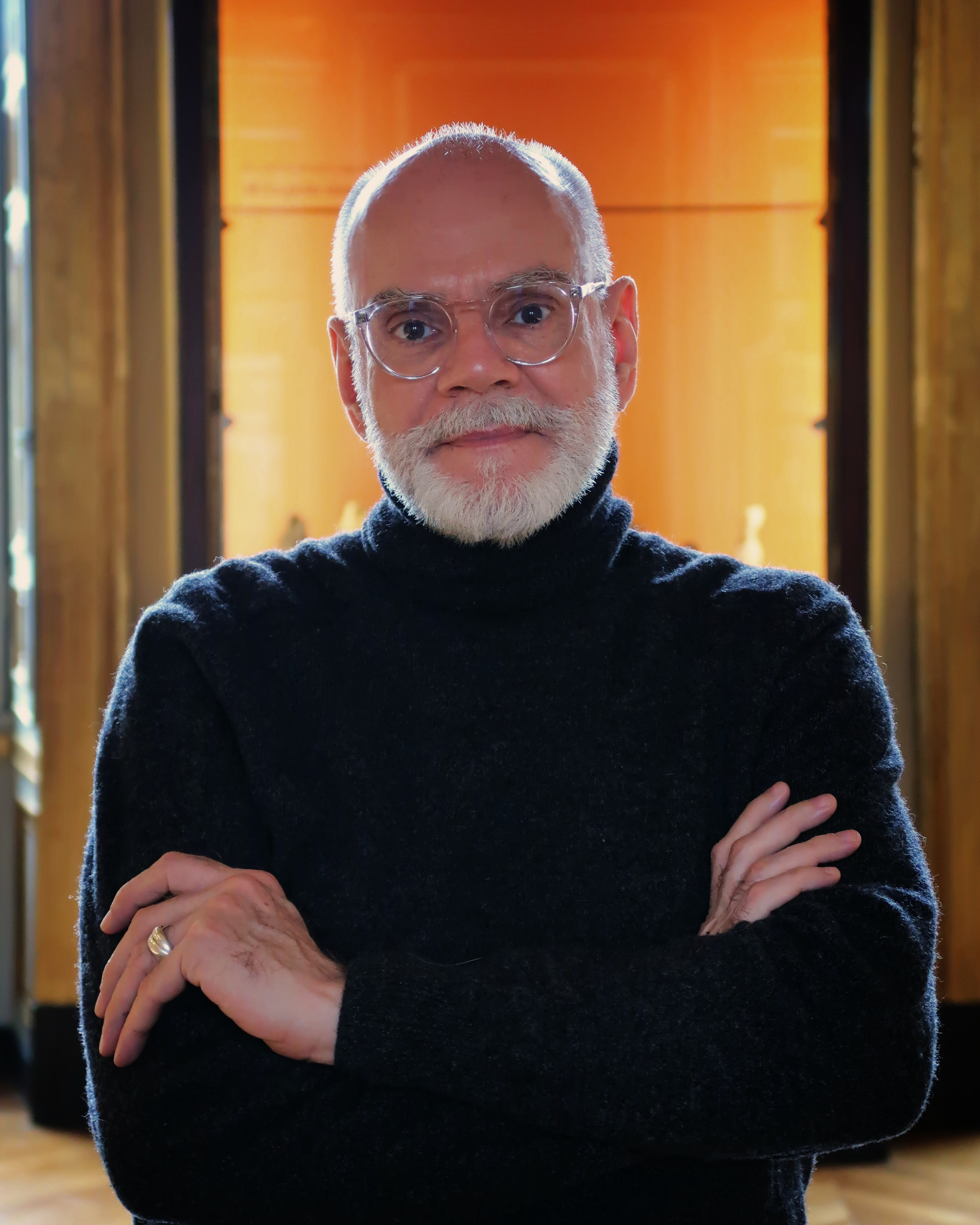
Gregory Reinhart

Gregory Reinhart (born June 18, 1951 in Pavilion, New York) is an American bass opera singer. He is noted for an extremely wide repertory which ranges from early music to the world premieres of several contemporary operas including Lowell Liebermann's The Picture of Dorian Gray, Philippe Manoury's K..., and Pascal Dusapin's Perelà, uomo di fumo.

He has been praised in The Metropolitan Opera Guide to Recorded Opera for his performance in Monteverdi's L'Incoronazione di Poppea as one of the finest Senecas on record with "a magnificent bass voice: firm and clear throughout its wide range".

== Biography ==
Gregory Reinhart was raised in upstate New York. In 1971, he entered Boston's New England Conservatory (NEC), where he studied voice with Mark Pearson and took master classes with Eleanor Steber. He graduated "with distinction" in 1974 and went on to receive his Master of Music Degree there in 1977. In 1976 he was a recipient of a fellowship award that also allowed him to train with Phyllis Curtin at the Tanglewood Music Center in Massachusetts. While at the NEC, he appeared in student performances of Ravel's L'heure espagnole and Donizetti's Don Pasquale.

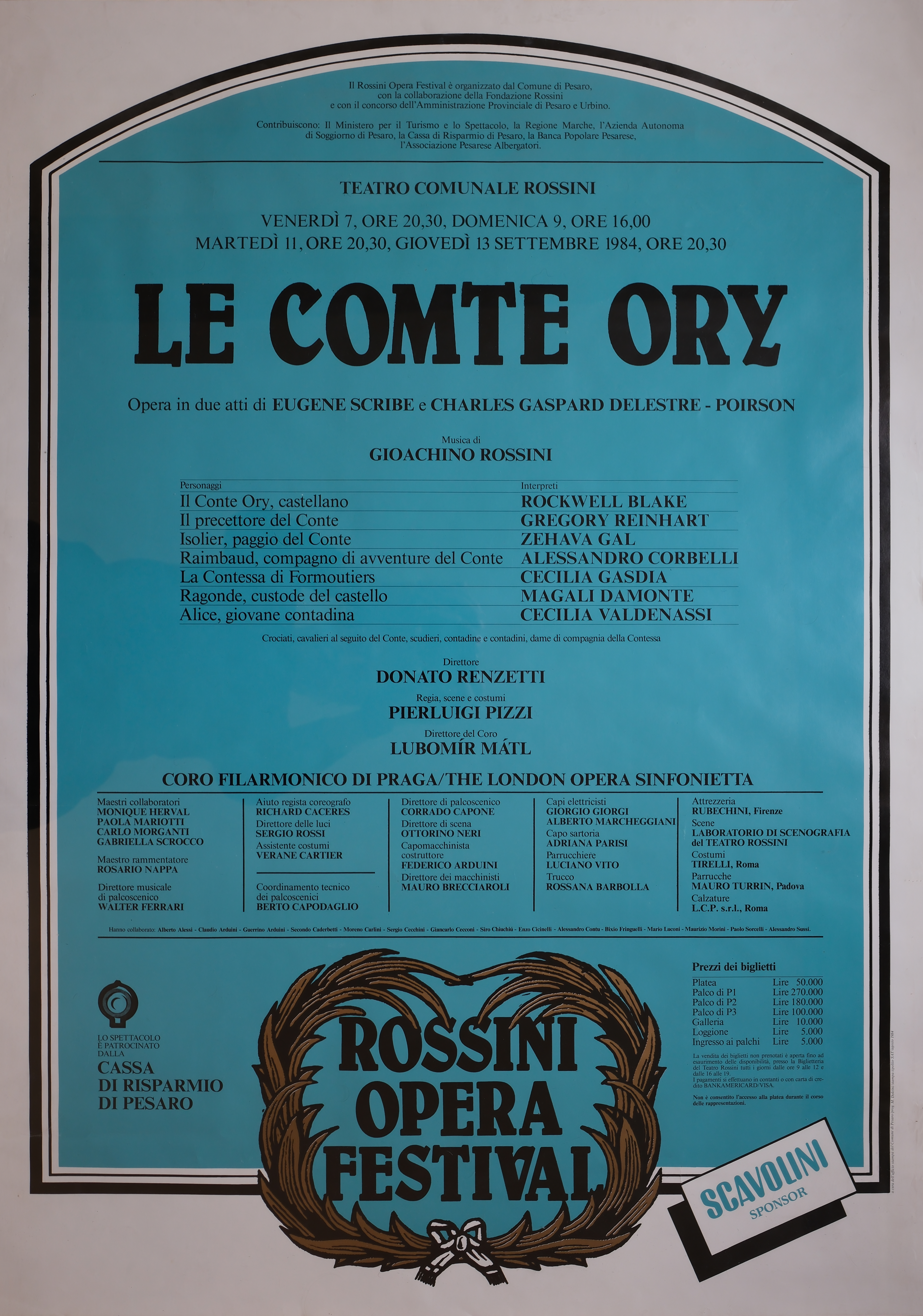
Le Comte Ory (Rossini Festival, Pesaro, Italy) 1984

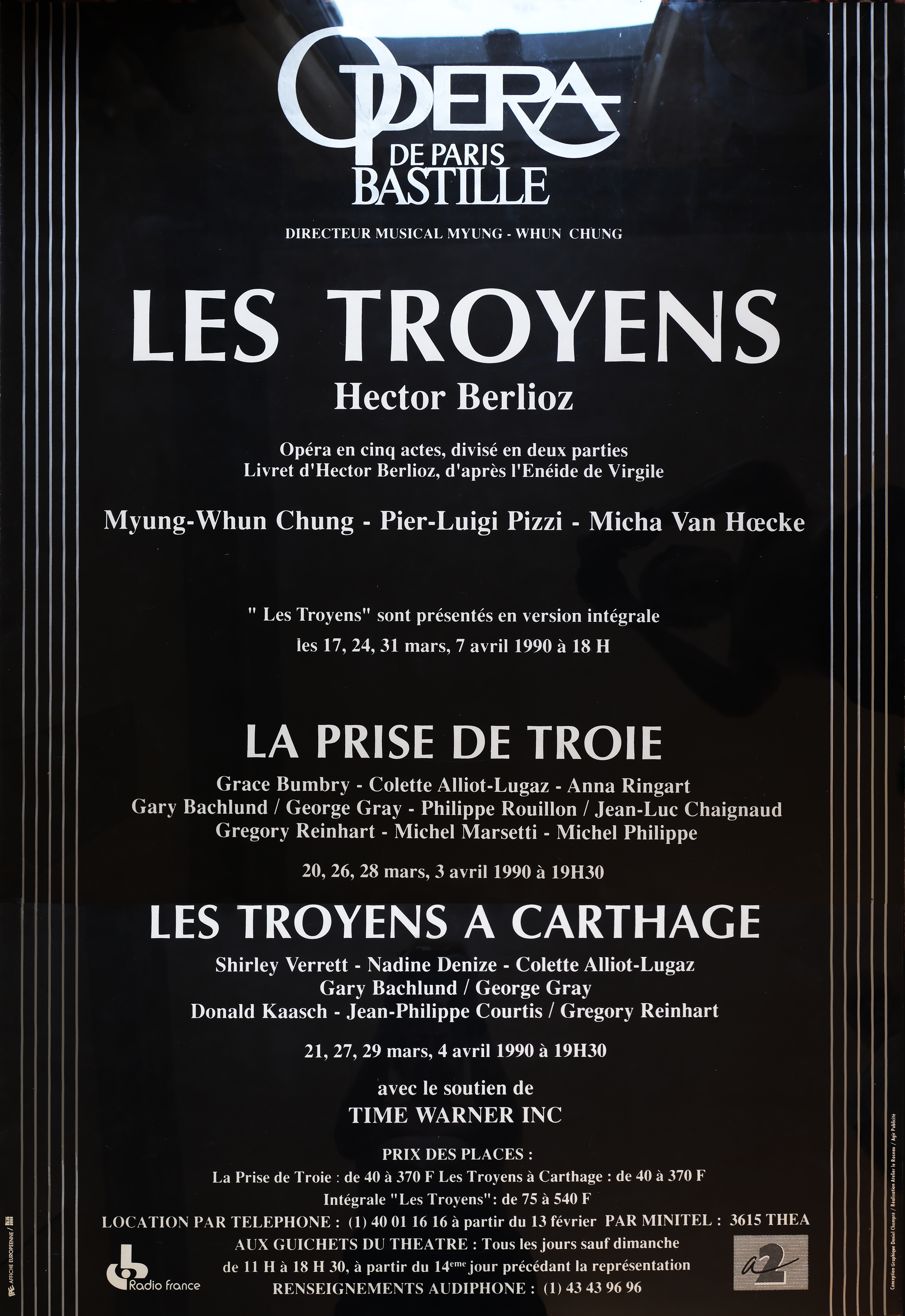
Les Troyens (Opéra de Paris) 1990

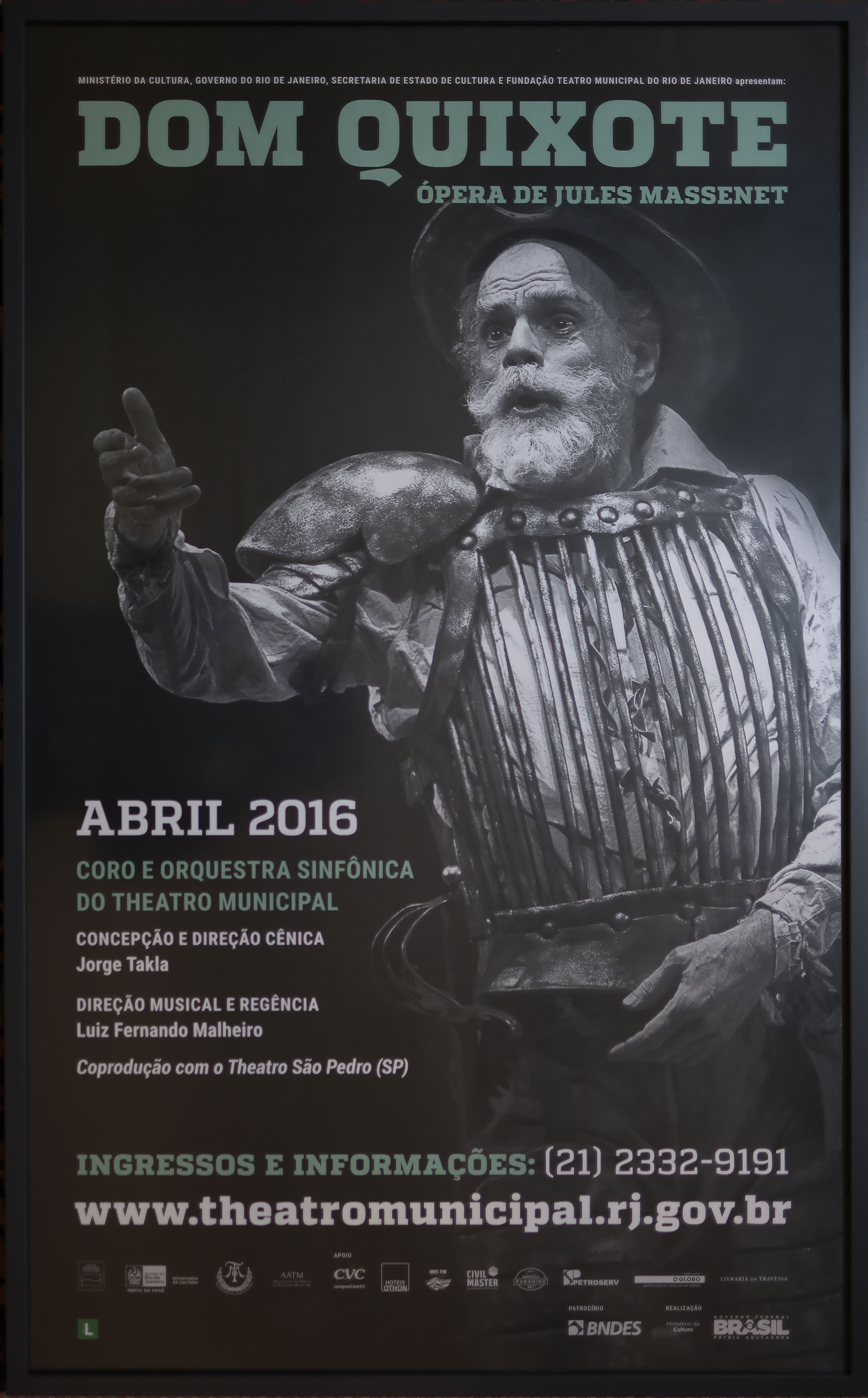
Don Quichotte (Teatro Municipal, Rio de Janeiro) 2016

He directed the choir of St. John the Baptist in Quincy, sang with Emmanuel Music, and appeared as a soloist with the Boston Symphony Orchestra in the Monteverdi Vespers, Bach's St. Matthew Passion and Tchaikovsky's opera Eugene Onegin. Another early venture into opera was his performance in Verdi's Giovanna d'Arco with Boston Concert Opera, where according to the Boston Globe critic, Richard Dyer, "he sang the guest-star New York contingent right off the stage".

Reinhart then went on to train as an opera singer at the American Institute of Musical Studies in Graz, where he took further classes with Eleanor Steber and studied with the soprano Patricia Brinton who encouraged him to continue his preparation in Paris. He remained with her there for two years, thanks to a private donor from Quincy, Adelina Chella. During his years in Paris, he received the advice and encouragement of Pierre Bernac and Camille Maurane.

He met the French musicologist Jacques Chuilon in 1980. Their collaboration developed a vocal technique that allowed Reinhart to perform a wide repertory from Bach and Mozart to the dramatic bass roles of Richard Wagner, meeting the vocal demands of modern music, and the subtleties of German Lieder and French Mélodie.

Reinhart made his French operatic debut with the Atelier Lyrique de Tourcoing in 1981, when he sang the title role of Giovanni Paisiello's Le roi Théodore à Venise in its first performance in modern times. In 1984 he appeared at the Théâtre du Châtelet as both Huascar and Bellone in Rameau's Les Indes Galantes. It was the first time that a fully staged Rameau opera was performed in Paris with a full baroque period instrument orchestra. That same year he sang the role of Arnold in the French premiere of Hans Werner Henze's La chatte anglaise at the Opéra-Comique.

Reinhart was guest artist with the Opéra de Paris in more than 200 performances, displaying his versatility there in works by Handel, Cimarosa, Berlioz, Rossini, Strauss, Hindemith, Janacek, Manoury, Henze, Fénelon, and Dusapin. Notably, he was cast as Narbal and Panthée in Berlioz’s Les Troyens for the official opening of Paris’ Bastille Opera Theater in 1990.

Internationally, Reinhart has also been a guest performer in opera, oratorio and recital in many prominent music festivals including the Aix-en-Provence Festival, the Handel Festival, Halle, the Santa Fe Opera Festival, the Rossini Opera Festival in Pesaro, and the Chorégies d'Orange Festival. Amongst the ensembles he worked with are Groupe Vocale de France under John Alldis, Ensemble intercontemporain under Pierre Boulez and Les Arts Florissants which he co-founded with William Christie.

Although he continued to be based in France, Reinhart increasingly appeared in the United States. In 2002 he made his debut at New York City Opera as Claudius in Agrippina, followed by Pooh-Bah in The Mikado. His Washington National Opera debut followed in 2005 as The Old Hebrew in Samson et Dalila, conducted by Plácido Domingo. The following year he made his Metropolitan Opera debut as The Armoured Man in Die Zauberflöte. He continued as Principal Artist at the Met until 2017. Engagements followed in Portland, Pittsburgh, San Diego, San Francisco, and Carnegie Hall in New York.

In 2011, Reinhart made a local debut in São Paulo, Brazil, as Hunding in Die Walküre. He thus embarked upon an important chapter in that country which led to wide-ranging engagements including Hagen in Götterdämmerung, Osmin in Mozart’s Die Entfürung aus dem Serail, and the title role of Don Quichotte by Massenet. That signature role, in a co-production with the Theatro Municipal in Rio de Janeiro, was named Best Production of the Year in 2016.

In 2017 Gregory was inducted into the PCS Hall of Fame, in his home town of Pavilion, New York.

== World premiere performances ==
- Bass soloist in Gilbert Amy’s Missa cum jubilo, Orchestre de Paris, Peter Eötvös, cond. (CD Erato)
- Bass soloist in Volker David Kirchner’s Missa Moguntina, Mainzer Domorchester, Mathias Breitschaft, cond.
- Bass soloist in Seymour Schifrin’s Chronicles, Boston Symphony Orchestra, Seiji Ozawa, cond.
- Two Sonnets of John Donne by Malcom Peyton, Boston, NEC
- Arnold in Hans Werner Henze’s La chatte anglaise (French language premier) Opéra-Comique, Paris, Dennis Russell Davies, cond. 1984
- Arnold in Hans Werner Henze’s The English Cat (first English-language recording) with The BBC Orchestra, London, Dennis Russell Davies, cond. 1985
- Le Bouddhiste in Alberto Bruni-Tedeschi's Secondatto, world premiere, Opéra de Nice, 1987
- Basil Hallward in Lowell Liebermann's The Picture of Dorian Gray, world premiere, Opéra de Monte-Carlo, 1996
- The Investigating Magistrate and The Prison Chaplain in Philippe Manoury's K..., world premiere, Opéra Bastille, 2001
- Pilone the Philosopher and The king's guard in Pascal Dusapin's Perelà, uomo di fumo, world premiere, Opéra Bastille, 2003

== Repertoire ==
Gregory Reinhart's wide ranging stage repertoire includes:

- Beethoven
  - Fidelio (Rocco)
- Bellini
  - Norma (Oroveso)
- Berlioz
  - Les Troyens (Panthée) (Narbal)
  - L’Enfance de Christ (le Père du famille)
- Biber
  - Arminio (Arminio)
- Bizet
  - Carmen (Zuniga)
- Britten
  - Billy Budd (Claggart)
- Alberto Bruni-Tedeschi
  - Secondatto (le Bouddhiste)
- Campra
  - Tancrède (Ismenor)
- Cesti
  - L'Argia (Solimano)
  - Orontea (Creonte)
  - Semiramide (Feraspe)
- Cimarosa
  - Il matrimonio segreto (Lord Robinson)
- Marc-Antoine Charpentier
  - Judith et Holoferne (Holoferne)
  - Le Jugement Dernier (Dieu)
- Debussy
  - Pelléas et Mélisande (Arkel)
- Donizetti
  - Anna Bolena (Lord Rochefort)
  - Don Pasquale (Don Pasquale)
- Dusapin
  - Perelà, uomo di fumo (Pilone the Philosopher/The king's guard)
- Fénelon
  - Faust (Wagner, Le Moine)
- Gilbert and Sullivan
  - The Mikado (Poo-Bah)
- Gershwin
  - Porgy and Bess (Porgy)
- José Melchor Gomis (1791–1836)
  - La Revenant (Sir Arundel)
- Gounod
  - Roméo et Juliette (Frère Laurent)
- Gabrielli
  - Flavio Cuniberto (Ugone)
- Handel
  - Agrippina (Claudius)
  - Alcina (Melisso)
  - Ariodante (King of Scotland)
  - Athalia (Abner)
  - Imeneo (Argenio)
  - Hercules (Hercules)
  - Orlando (Zoroastro)
  - Pasticcio (Mago)
  - Saul (Saul)
  - Tamerlano (Leone)
- Henze
  - La chatte anglaise (Arnold)
- Hindemith
  - Mathis der Maler (Riedinger)
- Janáček
  - The Cunning Little Vixen (The Badger/The Priest)
- Landi
  - Il Sant'Alessio (Demonio)
- Liebermann
  - The Picture of Dorian Gray (Basil Hallward)
- Lully
  - Alceste (Caron)
- Magnard
  - Bérénice (Mucien)
- Manoury
  - K... (The Investigating magistrate/The Prison Chaplain)
- Massenet
  - Don Quichotte (Don Quichotte)
- Meyerbeer
  - Les Huguenots (Marcel)
- Monteverdi
  - L'incoronazione di Poppea (Seneca)
  - Il ballo delle ingrate (Plutone)
  - L'Orfeo (Caronte/Plutone)
  - Il ritorno di Ulisse in patria (Nettuno)
- Mozart
  - Don Giovanni (Commendatore)
  - Die Entführung aus dem Serail (Osmin)
  - Die Zauberflöte (Sarastro, Zweite geharnischter Mann)
  - La finta semplice (Don Cassandro)
- Perti
  - Gesù al Sepolcro (Centurione)
- Peri
  - Euridice (Plutone)
- Giovanni Paisiello
  - Le roi Théodore à Venise (Le roi Théodore)
- Puccini
  - La bohème (Colline)
- Purcell
  - King Arthur (Cold Genius)
  - Dido and Aeneas (Aeneas)
- Pizzetti
  - Assassinio nella cattedrale (Third Priest)
- Prokofiev
  - L’Amour des trois oranges (Tchelio)
- Rameau
  - Les Indes Galantes (Huascar/Bellone)
  - Hippolyte et Aricie (Thésée/Pluton)
  - Les Paladins (Anselme)
  - Zoroastre (Abramane)
- Rihm
  - Jakob Lenz (Oberlin)
- Rossini
  - La Cenerentola (Alidoro)
  - Le comte Ory (Le Gouverneur)
  - La donna del lago (Douglas)
  - Guillaume Tell (Walter Leuthold)
  - L'italiana in Algeri (Mustafà)
- Sacrati
  - La finta pazza (Capitano)
- Saint-Saëns
  - Samson et Dalila (The Old Hebrew)
- Salieri
  - Falstaff (Falstaff)
- Schoenberg
  - Die Jakobsleiter (One Who Struggles)
  - Moses und Aron (Priest)
- Strauss
  - Daphne (Dritte Schäffer)
  - Die Frau ohne Schatten (Der Einarmiger)
  - Salome (opera) (Fünfter Jude, Erster Soldat)
- Stravinsky
  - Pulcinella (Bass soloist)
  - The Rake's Progress (Trulove/Nick Shadow)
- Verdi
  - Giovanna d'Arco (Giacomo)
  - Luisa Miller (Walter)
- Vivaldi
  - La fida ninfa (Oralto)
- Wagner
  - Tannhäuser (Landgraf) (Biterolf)
  - Der fliegende Holländer (Daland)
  - Parsifal (Titurel)
  - Tristan und Isolde (König Marke)
  - Die Walküre (Hunding)
  - Götterdämmerung (Hagen)

== Selected discography ==
- Beethoven: Symphony No. 9 (Augér, Reinhart, Robbin, Rolfe Johnson; London Symphony Chorus; Academy of Ancient Music; Christopher Hogwood, conductor). Label: L'Oiseau-Lyre/Decca.
- Berlioz: L'enfance du Christ (Reinhart, Osada, Theruel, Saelens, Cognet; Radio Suisse Italienne Orchestra and Chorus; Serge Baudo, conductor). Label: Forlane
- Cesti: Orontea (Bierbaum, Cadelo, Müller-Molinari, Reinhart, Jacobs, Poulenard, De Mey, Sarti; Concerto vocale; René Jacobs, conductor). Label: Harmonia Mundi.
- Charpentier: Pastorale de Noël (Mellon, Feldman, Reinhart; Les Arts Florissants; William Christie, conductor). Label: Harmonia Mundi.
- Fauré: Mélodies (with Dalton Baldwin, piano) Label: Harmonia Mundi
- Handel: Messiah (Kweksilber, Bowman, Elliott, Reinhart; The Sixteen; Amsterdam Baroque Orchestra; Ton Koopman, conductor). Label: Erato.
- Handel: Saul (Kalpers, Jezovsek, Koch, Elwes, Kermes, Reinhart, Meier; Cologne Chamber Choir; Cartusianum Collegium; Peter Neumann, conductor). Label: MD&G Records
- Monteverdi: Il ballo delle ingrate (Laurens, Visse, Mellon, Reinhart, Feldman, Junghänel; Les Arts Florissants; William Christie, conductor). Label: Harmonia Mundi.
- Monteverdi: L'incoronazione di Poppea (Augér, Jones, Bowman, Reinhart, Watson, Beesley; City of London Baroque Sinfonia; Richard Hickox, conductor). Label: Virgin Classics
- Mozart: Requiem K. 626 (Hill, Visse, Reinhart, Alliot-Lugaz; Nord-Pas-de-Calais Regional Choir; La Grande Ecurie et la Chambre du Roy; Jean-Claude Malgoire, conductor). Label: Sony.
- Prokofiev: L'Amour des Trois Oranges (Bacquier, Bastin, Caroli, Dubosc, Fournier, Gautier, Henry, Lagrange, Parraguin, Reinhart, Texier; Opéra National de Lyon Orchestra and Chorus; Kent Nagano, conductor). Label: EMI Classics.
