= Dominique Visse =

French opera singer (born 1955)

Dominique Visse (born 30 August 1955) is a French countertenor and founder of the Ensemble Clément Janequin.

== Life and career ==
Dominique Visse was a chorister at the Notre-Dame de Paris and studied organ and flute at the Versailles Conservatory. As a musician, he developed an interest in Medieval and Renaissance repertories. After studying with Alfred Deller and René Jacobs from 1976 to 1978, he made his opera debut at Tourcoing in Monteverdi's L'incoronazione di Poppea in 1982.

Visse devotes himself to performing of secular and religious music of the Renaissance. He is also known for his interpretations of the Parisian chansons.

Visse is married to soprano Agnès Mellon.

== Selected discography ==
Opera

- Purcell: Dido and Aeneas
- Monteverdi: Il ritorno d'Ulisse in patria
- Handel: Giulio Cesare
- Handel: Ottone
- Handel: Rinaldo
- Charpentier Actéon H.481
- Charpentier: David et Jonathas H.490
- Charpentier: Le Malade imaginaire H.495
- Hasse: Cleofide
- Vivaldi: L'incoronazione di Dario
- Vivaldi: Montezuma
- Sartorio: Giulio Cesare
- Cavalli: La Calisto
- Poulenc: Le Gendarme incompris
- Zamponi: Ulisse all'isola di Circe

Recitals

- Charpentier: "Motets à double Choeur" H.403, H.404, H.135, H.136, H.137, H.392, H.410, H.167, conducted by Ton Koopman (2 CD Erato 1992)
- Charpentier: "Vêpres Solennelles" H.540, H.190, H.50, H.149, H.52, H.150, H.51, H.161, H.191, H.65, H.77, conducted by Jean-Claude Malgoire (2 CD CBS Sony 1987)
- Songs for Seven Centuries – Machaut to Ferrero, with Éric Bellocq (lute) and Kazuoki Fujii (piano)
- Campra – French Cantatas. Jill Feldman, Dominique Visse, Jean-François Gardeil
- The Three Countertenors – Andreas Scholl, Pascal Bertin
- with Agnès Mellon; "Parole e Querele d'Amore", Madrigali a due voci, Zigzag, 2011
- Takemitsu – Songs
- Bach. Café Zimmermann. Alpha
- Dom Quichotte Cantatas & Comic Concertos, Céline Frisch, Café Zimmermann
- Vinum et Musica – Capella de la Torre.
