= Joël Suhubiette =

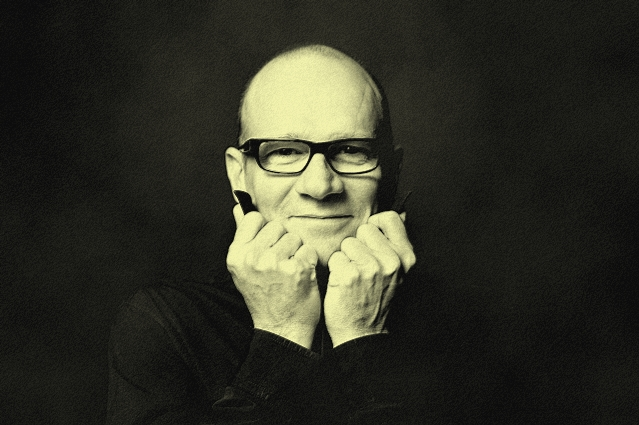
Joël Suhubiette

Joël Suhubiette (born in 1962) is a contemporary French choral conductor. In particular, he conducts the chamber choir Les Éléments which he founded in Toulouse and with which he received a Victoire de la musique classique in 2006 and the Ensemble Jacques Moderne in Tours.

== Biography ==
Born in 1962 in Orthez, Suhubiette played the piano very early. He then went on to undertake musical studies at the Conservatoire à rayonnement régional de Toulouse. He joined the early music department where he studied singing with John Elwes and Guillemette Laurens. At the University of Toulouse Le Mirail he studied musicology and choral conducting with Alix Bourbon, whose vocal ensemble he joined which allowed him, at a very young age, to sing under the direction of Michel Corboz, Jean-Claude Malgoire, Gustav Leonhardt etc. It was at this time, in 1985, that he founded Les Éléments with friends singers from the Conservatoire and the university, an ensemble that later became the chamber choir he still conducts in Toulouse.

He then began his professional career as a singer with Les Arts Florissants of William Christie. In 1986 his meeting with Philippe Herreweghe played a decisive role: for twelve years he sang in his ensembles – La Chapelle Royale and the Collegium Vocale Gent – with which he took part in more than thirty recordings and discovered the diversity of the vocal repertoire to which the Belgian conductor devoted himself with his two prestigious choirs. Soon, Philippe Herreweghe made him his assistant and he was entrusted with the preparation of the choir for productions and recordings.

In 1993, Suhubiette took over the management of the Ensemble Jacques Moderne, whose founder Jean-Pierre Ouvrard died at the end of 1992. It was the beginning of a new musical adventure that immersed him in the universe of a cappella polyphony of the French, English and Spanish Renaissance music to which he dedicated some of his recordings. (Regnard, Jean Mouton, Guerrero, Morales). Very soon, he extended the ensemble's repertoire to the composers of the 17th and 18th centuries, giving a preponderant place to the works of the first German Baroque, (Schein, Schütz and Buxtehude). A little later, he performed with l'Ensemble the motets, passions, Mass in B minor and short masses by Johann Sebastian Bach, anthems by Purcell and Handel, Purcell's operas (Dido and Aeneas, King Arthur), and the French Baroque repertoire.

As early as 1997, with the chamber choir Les Éléments he conducted in Toulouse, he began conducting the a cappella repertoire of the 19th and 20th centuries, the Baroque oratorios (Johann Sebastian Bach, Handel) classical (Mozart, Haydn) and commissioned a large number of works from contemporary composers (Patrick Burgan, Ivan Fedele, Philippe Hersant, Pierre Jodlowski, Alexandros Markeas, Zad Moultaka, Vincent Paulet, Ton That Tiet, Antonio Chagas Rosa). He also plays Stravinsky, Poulenc, Britten, Dallapiccola, Berio, Mantovani, Dusapin. Thanks to his assiduous practice of the a cappella repertoire, the chamber choir "Les Éléments" was one of the most important choirs in France, and with it, Suhubiette performed in Europe, the US, Canada, Tunisia, Lebanon, Egypt. The ensemble was the guest of many conductors (Michel Plasson, Christophe Rousset, Philippe Herreweghe, Christophe Coin, John Nelson, Emmanuel Krivine, Lawrence Foster, Marc Minkowski, Jérémie Rhorer...

In 2005, l'Ensemble was laureate of the Liliane Bettencourt Prize for choral singing awarded by the Academy of Fine Arts, and in 2006, it was consecrated "Ensemble de l'année" at the Victoires de la musique classique.

With his two ensembles, Suhubiette has recorded for record companies Virgin Classics, Éditions Hortus, Calliope, Ligia, l'Empreinte Digitale, Naïve Records and Mirare, and many of his records have received awards and critical acclaim.

He is also interested in the other vocal world of opera. He conducts Mozart's operas, Don Giovanni, The Magic Flute, The Marriage of Figaro, Die Entführung aus dem Serail (at the Dijon opéra, the Saint-Céré festival), the comedy operas by Jacques Offenbach, the French premiere of Kurt Weill's Der Silbersee at the Massy Opera House, Les caprices de Marianne by Henri Sauguet.

In the oratorio domain, the programmes led him to conduct the Orchestre national du Capitole de Toulouse, the Orchestre de Chambre de Toulouse, the Orchestre Baroque Les Passions, Les Folies françoises, the Café Zimmermann, Gli Incogniti, Concerto Soave, the Ensemble Baroque de Limoges, the Pau-Pays de Béarn orchestra, Les Percussions de Strasbourg, Ensemble Ars Nova etc.

The Abbey School of Sorèze in the Tarn département invited him in 2006 to become the artistic director of its festival, Musique des Lumières.

Since 2008, Suhubiette has been teaching regularly in the choir conducting class of the Conservatoire national supérieur de musique et de danse de Lyon.

In 2014, he was awarded the rank of Officer of the Order of Arts and Letters by the French Ministry of Culture.

== Discography ==
With the chamber choir Les Éléments:

- L'Âme slave. Dvorak, Tchaïkovsky, Rachmaninov, Stravinsky, Bartok, Ligeti. (L'Empreinte Digitale)
- Pierre Jodlowski. L'Aire du Dire, DVD (Eole Records)
- Méditerranée sacrée, ancient and modern polyphonies in Latin, Arabic, Aramaic and ancient Greek (L'Empreinte Digitale)
- Zad Moultaka, Visions (L'Empreinte Digitale)
- Vincent Paulet, De Profundis & Suspiros (Hortus)
- Philippe Hersant, Œuvres pour chœur (Virgin Classics)
- Shakespeare Songs. Ralph Vaughan Williams, Frank Martin, Benjamin Britten, William Mathias (Hortus)
- Ton That Tiet, Les Sourires de Bouddha (Hortus)
- Ave Verum: Choral works by Gabriel Fauré, Francis Poulenc, Maurice Duruflé, Jehan Alain (Naïve)
- Camille Saint-Saëns, Motets (Hortus)
- Maurice Duruflé, Requiem (Hortus)
- Alfred Desenclos, Messe de Requiem & Motets (Hortus)

With the Ensemble Jacques Moderne (after the name of the Lyonnais music printer Jacques Moderne):

- François Regnard, Motets, Calliope
- Marco da Gagliano, Motets, Calliope
- Clément Janequin, La Bataille de Marignan, Calliope
- Giovanni Bassano, Motets, Calliope
- Eustache Du Caurroy, Requiem, Calliope
- Cristóbal de Morales, Francisco Guerrero, De Beata Virgine, Ligia
- Giacomo Carissimi, Jephté, Jonas, Ligia
- Jean Mouton, Motets, Ligia
- Dieterich Buxtehude, Jesu, meine Freude, Ligia
- Domenico Scarlatti, Stabat Mater – Messe de Madrid, Ligia
- Reinhard Keiser, Passion Selon Saint-Marc, Mirare
