= Renaud Machart =

French journalist and music producer

- Born: March 22, 1962 (age 64); Lannion, France
- Occupations: Journalist, music critic, radio producer, music producer
- Known for: Work for Le Monde and France Musique

Renaud Machart (born 22 March 1962) is a French journalist, music critic, radio producer and music producer.

== Biography ==
Renaud Machart was born in Lannion, and first studied music under the direction of his father and then with Claudette Bohn, professor agrégée. He studied at the Ecole Nationale de Musique (ENM) in Saint-Brieuc and received a complete training in singing, piano, musical writing and chamber music at the conservatoire de Tours and musicology at the François Rabelais University of this same city from 1979 until 1982.

Trained in the singing classes of Denis Manfroy and Marie-Thérèse Foix, he met in 1979, when he entered the first year of DEUG at the University of Tours, Jean-Pierre Ouvrard, musicologist and conductor, who invited him to join the Ensemble Jacques Moderne of Tours, specializing in the repertoire of Renaissance music.

The following year, he replaced a sick singer from La Chapelle Royale for a recording of Pygmalion by Jean-Philippe Rameau with Gustav Leonhardt and soon integrated this ensemble with which he worked until 1992, as well as with the other groups led by the Belgian chef Philippe Herreweghe (Collegium Vocale Gent, Ensemble vocal européen). He participated in numerous recordings notably for Harmonia Mundi, Virgin Classics. He worked, among others, sometimes as soloist, with conductors Gustav Leonhardt, Ton Koopman, Jean-Claude Malgoire, Michel Corboz, John Eliot Gardiner, and Peter Phillips.

Recognizing himself in the definition by Anna Russell of the French singer ("Great Artistry, but no voice.") and preferring Havana cigars to vocalizations, he decided to stop singing in 1992. He would only open his mouth for jokes and soundtracks on France Musique on the occasion of certain firsts of Aprils where he sometimes embodied a soprano with a troubled past, Marguerite Spinrad, sometimes a Tibetan monk follower of the overtone singing, parody the piano music of Olivier Messiaen (an "unpublished" of the Catalogue d'oiseaux : La Roupette des Carpathes - sic !), sang a fake melody by Francis Poulenc on a real text by Marguerite Duras, and pastiched Steve Reich, Giacinto Scelsi or Gérard Pesson.

He has been artistic director of the ensemble of Contemporary classical music Musique oblique (1986–1992) as well as festivals such as the Festival estival de Paris (1989-1992) and the series Paris-New York at the French Institute/Alliance française of New York (1998–1999).

In 1987, he wrote his first criticisms for Le Monde de la musique. He was also responsible for the classic music page of the monthly magazine Paris Capitale before collaborating, since 1990, with the daily Le Monde, first as an irregular freelancer (1990–1994), then, from 1994, as a freelancer. Since July 1999, he has been a salaried editor of the daily culture series, in charge of classical music. This did not prevent him from dedicating a page-portrait to the singer Sheila in the same columns or to write the obituary of pornographic actress Linda Lovelace.

The editor-in-chief of the evening newspaper offered him to join the team of columnists of the newspaper from 3 September 2012. Until October 2014, he signed a daily chronicle Écrans ("screens") devoted to television. He is currently a journalist with the Le Monde radio and television service, while continuing to collaborate on occasion with the Culture and Culture and Ideas pages.

Since September 2011, he has also published a column in the monthly magazine Opéra Magazine.

Renaud Machart has been a producer at France Musique since 1987 where he has given numerous programs (debates, 7-9 hours, daily, weekly, etc.). In 2007-2008, he presented Les Rois de la galette which took up the principle of one of the oldest and most well-known programs of the channel: La Tribune des critiques de disques. From 2008 to 2010, he hosted Matinée Opéra on Sunday afternoon, which offered the discovery of rare lyrical works, often coming from the archives of the Institut national de l'audiovisuel (INA). In 2010-2011, he produced, on Saturday afternoon, Déraisonnable beauté, and since September 2011 he has been responsible for the Thursday, 11 am to 12.30 am portion of the program Le Matin des musiciens. From September 2010 to June 2012, he participated in the Casque et l'enclume, a critical round-table, each Friday, hosted by Lionel Esparza. At the beginning of 2014, at 1 pm, he co-ordinated Le Mitan des musiciens, a reworking of the Matin des musiciens. Since September 2015 he produces the Zigzag programme every Sunday at 12:05.

From 1992 to March 2009, he directed the record collection Ina, mémoire vive at the Institut national de l'audiovisuel, which has released tens of hours of unpublished musical archives. Renaud Machart has produced editions of old scores (notably the Requiem by André Campra used for the recording of Philippe Herreweghe at Harmonia Mundi), composed numerous presentations of recordings and is the author of several essays, biographies, critical editions or translations, notably devoted to North American music of the twentieth century.

== Bibliography ==
- 1993: Giacinto Scelsi ou le comte perché, Le Nouveau Commerce, Cahier 88/89
- 1993: Francis Poulenc : Journal de mes mélodies, complete critical editing and notes, Cicero Editeur
- 1995: Francis Poulenc, essay, Éditions du Seuil
- 1996: George Benjamin : parcours 1978-1996, essay, Les Cahiers de l'Ircam
- 2003: Le Journal parisien by Ned Rorem, translation and presentation, Éditions du Rocher
- 2004: John Adams, essay, Actes Sud
- 2004: From the Trumpet of The Chair Mender to The Flute of The Goatherd, in The Proust Project, collaboration, Farrar, Straus and Giroux, New York
- 2006: Aspects Of John Adams's Music : Floating Elegies and Music Boxes in The John Adams Reader, Essential Writings on an American Composer, under the direction of Thomas May, Amadeus Press
- 2007: Leonard Bernstein, essay, Actes Sud ISBN 978-2-7427-7214-8
- 2010: A la recherche de l'Americana, special issue on American music of the 20th century, Diapason No 579, (April)
- 2011: Le magicien d'Aix, mémoires intimes de Gabriel Dussurget (Actes Sud, published 8 June, preface by Kathleen Fontmarty Dussurget, introduction, text and notes by Renaud Machart)
- 2011: Françoise Sagan : Conversation with André Halimi L'art de ne pas y toucher, presentation (1 DVD INA-Radio France, coll. les Grandes heures, April)
- 2011: Jean Cocteau : entretien with André Parinaud Jean Cocteau, le poète du temps perdu, presentation (1 DVD INA-Radio France, coll. les Grandes heure, May)
- 2012: Salvador Dali, Radioscopie with Jacques Chancel, presentation (1 DVD INA-Radio France, coll. les Grandes heures)
- 2013: Stephen Sondheim (Actes Sud, collection Classica)
- 2013: Francis Poulenc : Inédits et créations mondiales (conception and presentation, Ina Mémoire vive)
- 2014: Niki de Saint Phalle : entretiens radiophoniques (presentation, 1 CD INA-Radio France, coll. les Grandes heures)
- 2016: Raymond Devos : entretiens et documents radiophoniques (presentation, 1 CD INA-Radio France, coll. les Grandes heures)
- 2016: Katia et Marielle Labèque, une vie à quatre mains, Éditions Buchet/Chastel
