= Regnard (surname) =

Regnard is a French language surname, and derives from the medieval French name Reginhard which is composed of the Gaulish Regin and the Teutonic hard or Hardy meaning 'brave'. Notable people with the surname include:

- Jean-François Regnard (1655–1709), French writer and dramatist
- François Regnard (c. 1530 – c. 1600), Franco-Flemish composer, one of five composer brothers
- Jacques Regnard (c. 1540 – 1599), one of the five composer brothers, known as Jacob Regnart in Germany

== See also ==
- fr:Albert Regnard (1832–1903), French socialist militant
- Félizé Regnard (1424–1474), mistress of Louis XI
- Victor Regnart (1886–1964), Belgian painter
