= Éditions Hortus =

French independent record label

Éditions Hortus is an independent French disk label, offering largely unknown songs and works for the organ in addition to contemporary compositions. Specialised in organ and choir music, it has in particular presented disks recorded at the Notre Dame de Paris and of its choir 'Les Éléments', as well as of the young harpsichordist Benjamin Alard.

Éditions Hortus wishes to produce disks containing rare or even previously unrecorded music.

Vincent Genvrin is the label's artistic director. Didier Maes is its executive producer.

== History ==
Founded in 1994, Éditions Hortus first showed its interest in disks with Via crucis (Stations of the Cross) by Franz Liszt, interpreted by the Sacrum Choir from Riga. The CD was accompanied by a series of fifteen screenprints by Daniel Vincent and Guillaume Dégé, printed in a limited, numbered edition.

On 17 November 2006, Didier Maes, producer of the label, was a guest in the France Musique programme "Par ici les sorties!" (Releases over here!), to present a selection of four Hortus disks.

In the spring of 2010, backed by the Conseil Général du Loiret, Éditions Hortus joined the "Amis de l'Orgue de Lorris" to record 17th-century Iberian and Flemish music, interpreted by organist Damien Colcomb in the communal 12th-century church.

On 7 February 2011, the Éditions Hortus catalogue listed 79 recordings available only on CD.

== Principal artists ==
=== Classical ===
- Britten Choir, directed by Nicole Corti. In 2005, the ensemble recorded masses, motets and organ pieces by Joseph Guy Ropartz (1864–1955) in honor of Saint Anne, with Loïc Mallié at the organ. In 2007, the ensemble worked again with Éditions Hortus for the 'Book of Hours' of Édith Canat de Chizy. These two recordings were well received by the critics.
- Female vocal ensemble Ad Limina
- Maîtrise Notre-Dame de Paris, director Lionel Sow
- Ensemble Grégorien, director Sylvain Dieudonné
- Bernard Tétu
- Russian orthodox choir of Riga
- Sacrum Choir, director Andreis Veismanis
- La Camerata Baroque choir, director Daniel Meylan
- Le Concert des Dames, direction Frédéric Bourdin
- Les Temps Modernes Ensemble

The chamber choir Les Éléments, directed by Joël Suhubiette, received the Victoire de la musique classique for best vocal ensemble in 2006.

=== Harpsichord ===
- Benjamin Alard, Prize of the jury and Prize of the public at the Harpsichord competition of Brugge 2004. In 2005, with Hortus, Benjamin Alard made his first recording 'which revealed him to the general audience', an anthology of keyboard music for harpsichord and organ; the disk was immediately taken up by the critics. In December 2006, Hortus recorded a collection of transcriptions for harpsichord of pieces by Reincken and Vivaldi. Three years later, Alard's interpretation of the Bauyn Manuscript (Éditions Hortus, 2008) was very well received by music critics.
- Freddy Eichelberger
- Laurent Stewart

=== Clavichord ===
- Cristiano Holtz

=== Organ ===
- Benjamin Alard
- Régis Allard
- Lionel Avot. In the summer of 2010, with Éditions Hortus, he recorded his first CD in the church Notre-Dame de la Dalbade in Toulouse with a selection of pieces by César Franck (1822–1890). Lionel Avot was introduced to Éditions Hortus by Vincent Genvrin, with whom he shares the experience of an apprenticeship with Jean Boyer. Lionel Avot was the guest on Gaëlle, Le Gallic's weekly radio programme on Sunday 27 February 2011.
- Jean Bizot
- Michel Bouvard
- Philippe Brandeis
- Damien Colcomb
- Jean-Baptiste Dupont
- François Espinasse
- Rolande Falcinelli
- Vincent Genvrin
- Juliette Grellety-Bosviel
- Jan Willem Jansen
- Pavel Kohout
- Olivier Latry
- Emmanuel Le Divellec
- Philippe Lefebvre
- Jean-Pierre Leguay
- Véronique Le Guen
- Loïc Mallié
- Jesùs Martin Moro. After meeting Didier Maes at the 2007 congress of the French-speaking Federation of friends of the organ, from 20 to 23 December 2009 he recorded a selection of early and contemporary repertoire in homage to the Basque country on the organ of the church of Urrugne, shortly after the inauguration of the instrument on 9 October 2009.
- François Ménissier. In charge of the Silbermann organ of the Saint Thomas church in Strasbourg from 1989 to 2003, he recorded several organ pieces by Bach with Éditions Hortus in 2000.
- Daniel Meylan
- Louis Thiry

=== Piano ===
- François Lambret
- Bruno Robilliard
- Nicolas Stavy. His interpretation of 'Four ballades op. 10', 'Third Sonata op. 5' and 'Theme and Variations in D minor' by Johannes Brahms (Éditions Hortus, 2008) was hailed by music critics.
- Isabelle Oehmichen

=== Flute ===
- Élise Battais

=== Harmonium ===
- Kurt Lueders

=== Jazz ===
- Guillaume de Chassy
- Jean-Marie Machado

=== Organist-composers ===
- Valéry Aubertin
- Laurent Carle
- Yves Castagnet
- Thierry Escaich, Victoires de la musique classique in 2003, 2006 and 2011 in the category Composers.
- Rolande Falcinelli
- Pierre Farago
- Éric Lebrun
- Christophe Marchand
- Benoît Mernier
- Jacques Pichard
- Jean-Baptiste Robin
