= Pietro Paolo Sabbatini =

Italian composer, orchestra director, and musician

Cover of the Canzione Spirituali a Una, a Due et a Tre Voci, of 1640

Pietro Paolo Sabbatino or Sabbatini (1600 – 1657) was an Italian composer, orchestra director and musician, who was born and died in Rome, and worked mainly in his home city. He composed mostly popular songs of his time, such as villanellas, capriccios, canzones and canzonettas, but he also composed religious music works, such as psalms.

His best known work are the Canzoni Spirituali a Una, a Due et a Tre Voci (Spiritual Songs at One, Two and Three Voices), published in 1640. He wrote a textbook on religious music, titled Toni Ecclesiastici Colle sue Intonazioni all'Uso Romano (1650).

From 1628 to 1630 Sabbatini was regent and musical director of the Arciconfraternitá della Morte et Orazione in Rome, and from 1630 to 1631 of the Church of San Luigi dei Francesi, also in Rome.

== Works, editions and recordings ==
- Intermezzi Spirituali, 1628
- Canzoni Spirituali a 1, a 2 et a 3 Voci, 1640

Recordings

- Intermezzi Spirituali No.3 - Ensemble Jacques Moderne, dir. Joël Suhubiette on Carissimi Jonas. Ligia Digital 2003
