= Kathryn Bullock =

American chemist and battery specialist

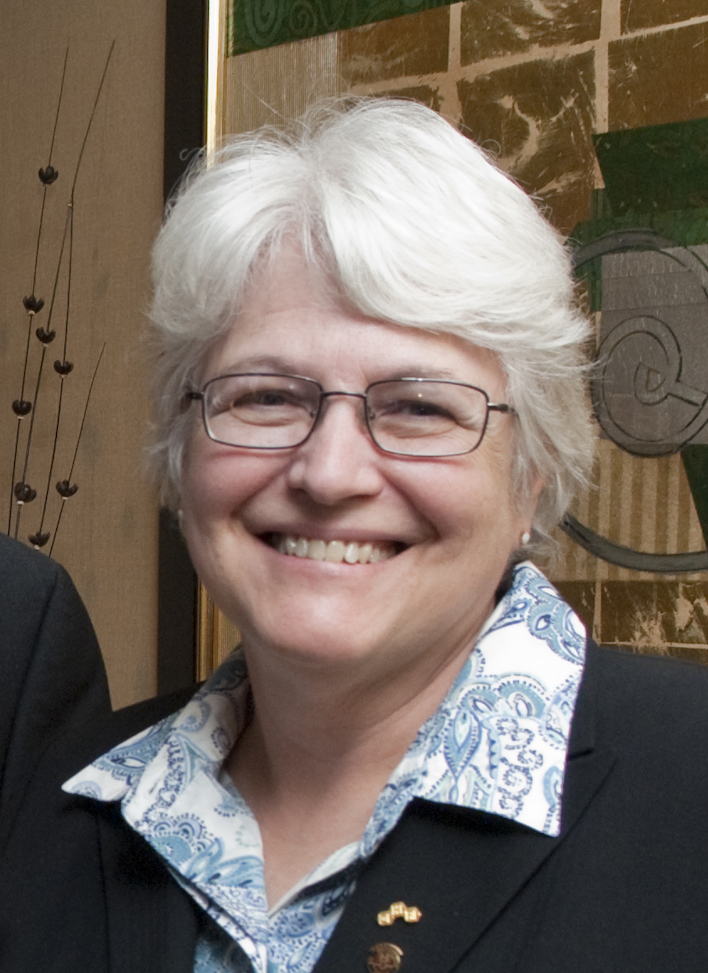
- Born: Norma Kathryn Rice; September 24, 1945; Bartlesville, Oklahoma
- Died: May 17, 2021 (aged 75); Chapel Hill, North Carolina
- Education: University of Colorado Boulder, Northwestern University
- Spouse: Kenneth Bullock
- Awards: Gaston Planté Medalist
- Scientific career
- Fields: Electrochemistry
- Doctoral advisor: Donald E. Smith

Kathryn Rice Bullock (September 24, 1945 – May 17, 2021) was a chemist, best known for her work in developing valve-regulated lead-acid batteries. Her theoretical and statistical modeling of the electrochemistry of batteries led to better understanding of processes such as corrosion and advances in battery design. Her work has applications for hybrid and electric cars, residential fuel cell systems and solar energy storage. Kathryn Bullock has published over 60 technical papers and holds at least 11 U.S. patents. She served as vice-president of the Electrochemical Society in 1992 and as president from 1995 to 1996. Bullock died on May 17, 2021, from Alzheimer's disease.

== Early life and education ==
(Norma) Kathryn Rice (later Bullock) was one of twins, born September 24, 1945, in Bartlesville, Oklahoma, to Robert Bruce Rice and Norma Elaine Fanshier. Her twin sister Judith Rice (later Henderson) became a scholar of sixteenth-century literature. Their father, Robert B. Rice, was a geophysicist. During summers Kathryn worked as a part-time secretary at Marathon Oil Company, where her father was employed. He encouraged her to pursue a scientific career.

Kathryn Rice attended the University of Colorado Boulder, receiving a B.A. in English and a minor in chemistry in 1967. She was the only female student in a lab of fifty men. In 1967, Kathryn Rice married Kenneth Bullock, a seminary student. They have two children, Kevin and Kerry.

Her first scientific position was as a combined secretary and technical staff person in a new battery development group, organized by John Devitt at Gates Rubber Company in Denver, Colorado. There Bullock became interested in nickel oxide-zinc batteries. She went to Northwestern University for further study, receiving an M.S. in chemistry in 1969 and a Ph.D. in physical chemistry in 1972. At Northwestern, she worked with Donald E. Smith, using alternating current polarography to study electrochemical reactions.

== Career ==
In 1972, Bullock rejoined the Electrochemical Research Department of Gates Rubber Company. John Devitt's group at Gates was working on development of a valve-regulated lead-acid battery (VRLA). Prior to the development of VRLAs, "flooded" rechargeable lead-acid batteries were used. They were filled with 30-40% sulfuric acid. At 85-90% of their charge capacity, chemical reactions within the battery became less effective, and water in the system was converted into hydrogen and oxygen gases. Flooded batteries could not be sealed, and had to be monitored to ensure effectiveness and prevent problems. In contrast, VRLAs were designed to ensure that oxygen would recombine rather than being lost. VRLAs contain acid inside a silica gel or absorb it into a porous glass separator. Gases that do not recombine are vented through a one-way pressure-release valve. Bullock developed computer models describing the relationships between the circuit voltage of VRLAs and their acid concentration, battery charge and internal temperature. She read widely and was inspired by the work of people like Jeanne Burbank, Paul Ruetschi, and Detchko Pavlov. She studied corrosion within batteries. She examined the effects of adding phosphoric acid to lead dioxide electrodes in gel batteries to increase battery cycle life, resulting in the creation of batteries with low levels of phosphoric acid. In 1977, Bullock joined Globe-Union, Inc. in Milwaukee, where she continued her work with VRLAs. Her work on the effects of adding phosphoric acid to lead dioxide electrodes won her the Battery Division Research Award from the Electrochemical Society in 1980.

In 1980, Bullock became manager of Globe-Union's Chemical Research Department, which later became part of Johnson Controls, Inc. At Johnson, funded in part by the U.S. Department of Energy, she and William Tiedemann developed JCI's Battery Technology Center. They did early research in areas including thermal management, grid corrosion, grid design, and load leveling, developing many different types of batteries including electric vehicle batteries. Bullock filed a number of patents on methods for improving battery design, production and performance.

In 1991, she was invited to lead a battery development group at AT&T Bell Labs (later Lucent). Her work on the development of batteries has led to improved designs which have been licensed and used all over the world. With AT&T Bell Labs's Power Systems Business Unit, she received the Deming Prize of the Japanese Union of Scientists and Engineers in 1994.

In 1996, AT&T Bell Labs became Lucent Technologies, and Bullock joined Medtronic, Inc. to develop lithium batteries for use in medical devices. She remained there for three years before becoming vice-president of C&D Technologies, Inc., where she remained for another three years. In 2003, she formed Coolohm, Inc., a consulting company specializing in power sources. She studied the role of carbon in battery design, and taught classes in power sources as an adjunct faculty member at Villanova University. She served on a number of policy-related committees and projects.

Bullock was an active member of the Electrochemical Society, which she joined in 1972. She helped to organize the Rocky Mountain (1973) and Southern Wisconsin (1982) Sections. She held a variety of appointments on offices and committees, most importantly as vice-president of the society in 1992 and as president from 1995 to 1996.

== Awards and honors ==
Bullock has received a number of awards and honors including the following:

- Gaston Planté Medalist from the Bulgarian Academy of Sciences (1996)
- Deming Prize of the Japanese Union of Scientists and Engineers, as part of the AT&T Bell Labs/Lucent Technologies Power Systems unit (1994)
- Fellow of the Royal Society of Chemistry (1988)
- Fellow of the American Institute of Chemists (1987)
- ECS Battery Division Research Award (1980)
- Electrochemical Society Summer fellow (1969)
- National Institutes of Health Fellow (1972)
- Phi Beta Kappa Society (1966)
