= Benjamin Alard =

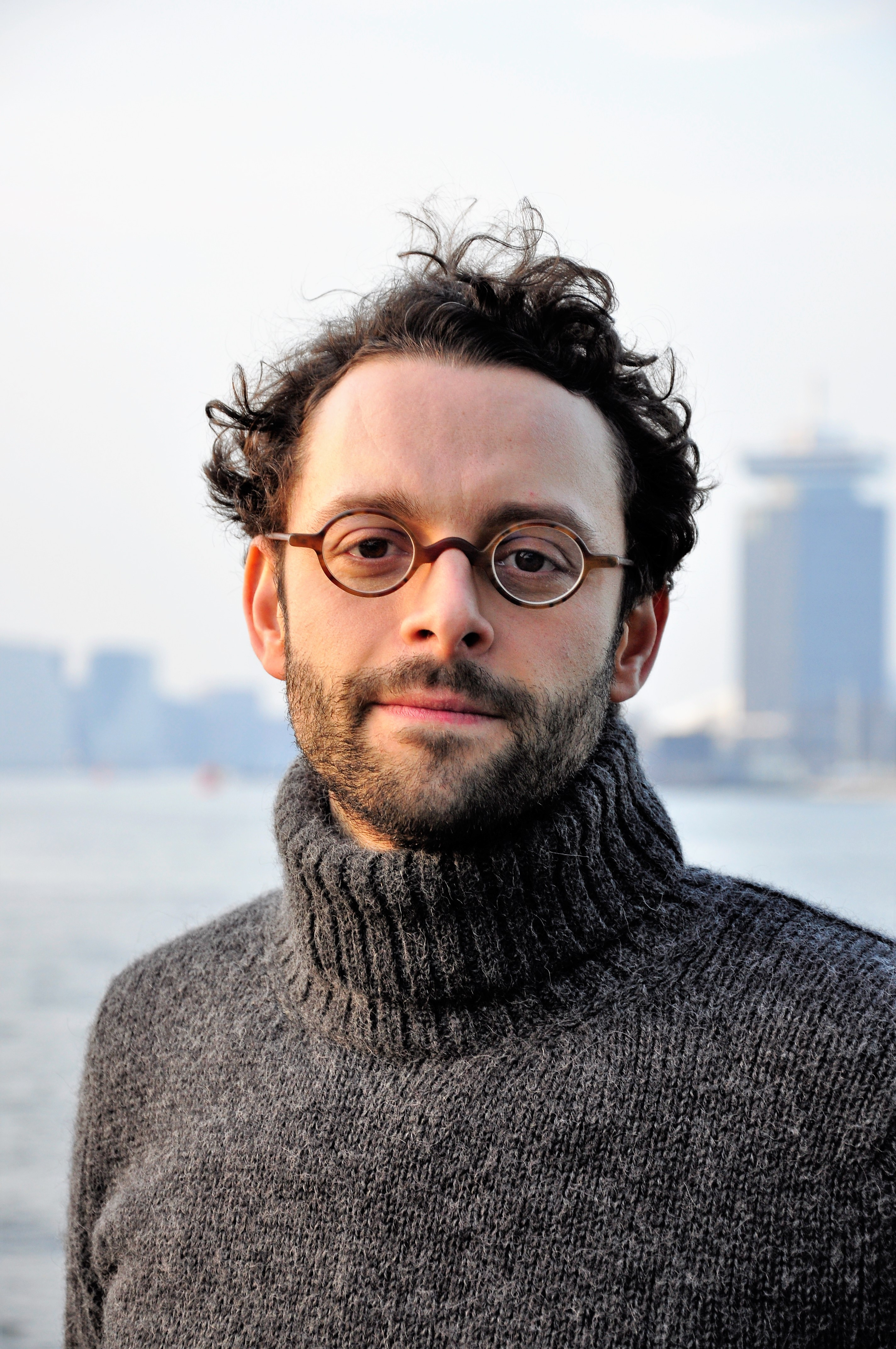
- Benjamin Alard in 2017

Background information
- Born: 13 July 1985 (age 41); Rouen, France
- Genre: Baroque music
- Instruments: Organ, Harpsichord, Clavichord, Claviorgan, Pedal harpsichord, Clavicytherium
- Label: Harmonia Mundi
- Website: www.benjaminalard.net

Benjamin Alard (born 13 July 1985, Rouen, France) is a French classical organist, harpsichordist and clavichordist.

== Biography ==
=== Early life and education ===
Alard began studying music in his hometown in Dieppe, France. He then entered the Conservatory of Rouen where he studied with Louis Thiry and François Ménissier; he focused on organ.

He was first introduced to the harpsichord by Elizabeth Joyé, with whom he studied in Paris before going on, in 2003, to the Schola Cantorum in Basel to work with Jörg-Andreas Bötticher, Jean-Claude Zehnder and Andrea Marcon.

He won First Prize and the Audience Prize at the 2004 International Harpsichord Competition in Bruges. In 2007, he won the Gottfried Silbermann Organ Competition in Freiberg.

=== Career ===
Since 2005 Alard has been organist of the Bernard Aubertin organ in the church of Saint-Louis-en-l'Île in Paris where each season he gives concerts of Johann Sebastian Bach music.

Alard performs recitals and chamber music on both the harpsichord and organ. He often performs repertoire for two harpsichords with Elisabeth Joyé, in duo with the violinist François Fernandez or in trio with flautist Emmanuel Pahud.

== Discography ==
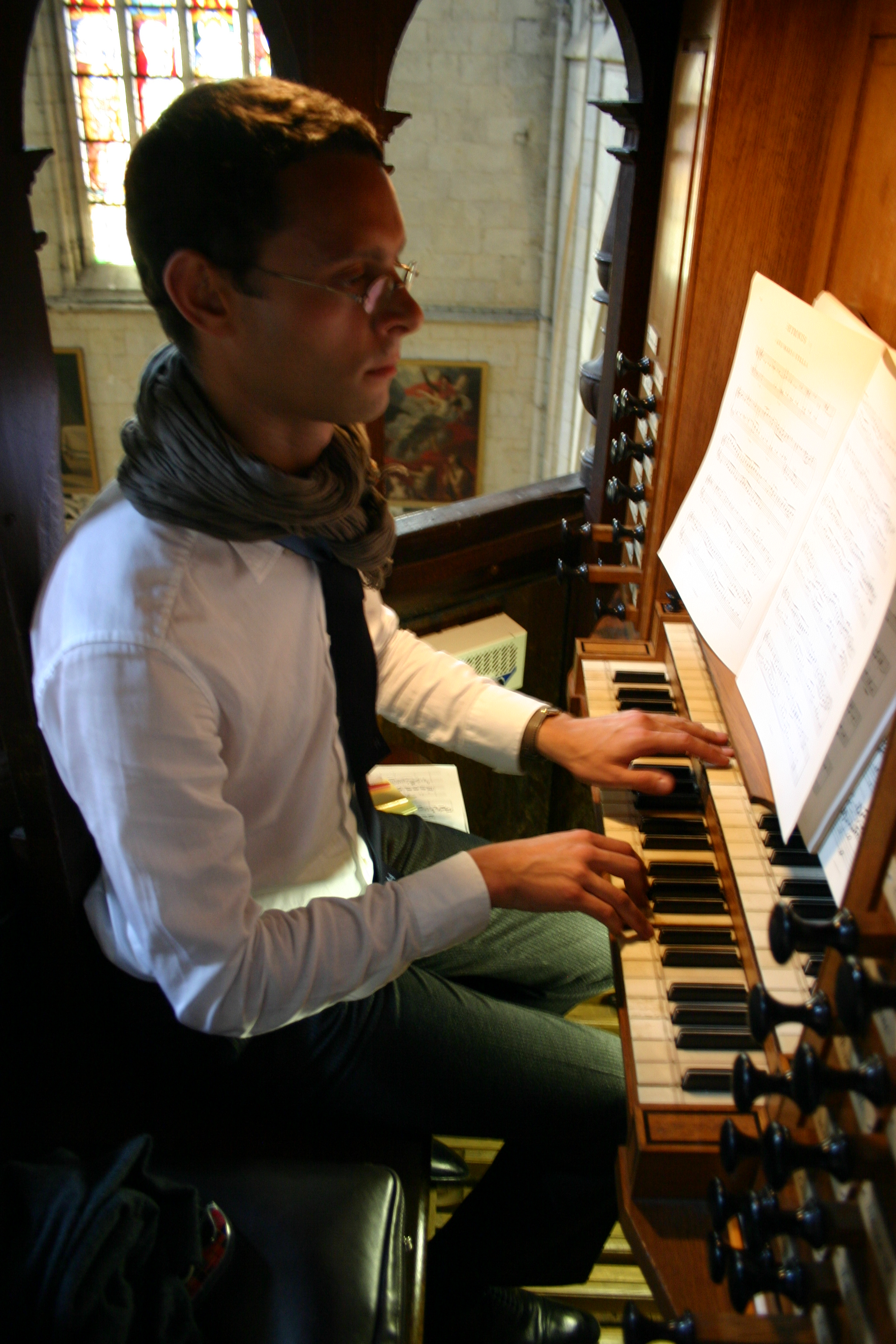
Alard in 2010

Alard has recorded for the label Hortus and has made several recordings of works by J.S. Bach for Alpha Classics (Trio Sonatas, Clavier-Übung I and II). His recordings have consistently received high praise from the press and have been awarded multiple prizes.

Alard records the complete works for harpsichord and organ solo of Johann Sebastian Bach for Harmonia Mundi. Twelve boxes, of 18, are already available. The project received positive reviews by critics.

Sources for the discography:

All recordings are released by Harmonia Mundi, if not indicated otherwise.

=== Johann Sebastian Bach: The Complete Works for Keyboard ===
- 2018: The Young Heir (Vol. 1, HMM 902450–52)
- 2019: Towards the North, 1705–1708 (Vol. 2, HMM 902453–56)
- 2020: In the French Style (À la française) (Vol. 3, HMM 902457–59)
- 2021: Alla Veneziana: Concerti Italiani (Vol. 4, HMM 902460–62)
- 2021: Weimar, 1708–1717: Toccatas & Fugues (Vol. 5, HMM 902463–65)
- 2022: The Well-Tempered Clavier, Book I (Vol. 6, HMM 902466–68)
- 2022: Orgelbüchlein (Vol. 7, HMM 902498–99)
- 2023: Köthen, 1717–1723: For Maria Barbara (Vol. 8, HMM 902469–71)
- 2024: Köthen, 1717–1723: The Happy Years (Vol. 9, HMM 902472–73)
- 2025: Trio Sonatas, BWV 525–530; Notebook for Anna Magdalena Bach (Vol. 10, HMM 902495–97)
- 2025: Clavier-Übungen I & II (Vol. 11, HMM 902475–77)
- 2026: The Well-Tempered Clavier, Book II; Chaconnes, BWV 1178 & 1179 (Vol. 12, HMM 902484–85)

=== Other solo recordings ===
- 2006: Andreas Bach Buch: Florilegium (Hortus 045)
- 2007: Benjamin Alard joue J. S. Bach: Transcriptions pour clavecin (Hortus 050)
- 2008: Manuscrit Bauyn – Works by Froberger, Louis Couperin, Rossi and Frescobaldi (Hortus 065)
- 2009: J. S. Bach: Sonate a 2 Clav. & Pedal, BWV 525–530 (Alpha 152)
- 2010: Musique française des XVIIe et XVIIIe siècles – Works by Titelouze, Boyvin, Couperin and others (Hortus 076)
- 2010: J. S. Bach: Clavier-Übung I – Six Partitas, BWV 825–830 (Alpha 157)
- 2011: J. S. Bach: Clavier-Übung II – Italian Concerto and French Overture (Alpha 180)
- 2017: J. S. Bach: Wachet auf! – Six Schübler Chorales, BWV 645–650, and other works (L'Autre Monde / Académie Bach)
- 2023: The Couperin Family – Works by Louis, François and Armand-Louis Couperin (MarchVivo MV007)

=== Collaborations ===
- 2011: J. S. Bach: Sei Suonate a violino solo e cembalo concertato, BWV 1014–1019, with François Fernandez and Philippe Pierlot (Flora 1909)
- 2013: J. S. Bach: The Orchestral Suites, BWV 1066–1069, with La Petite Bande and Sigiswald Kuijken (Accent 24279)
- 2014: Telemann: Concertos & Suites, with La Petite Bande, Sigiswald Kuijken and Bart Coen (Accent 24288)
- 2016: Telemann: Trumpet & Horn Concertos, with La Petite Bande, Sigiswald Kuijken, Jean-François Madeuf and Pierre-Yves Madeuf (Accent 24318)
- 2016: J. S. Bach: Erbarme dich, with Reinoud Van Mechelen and A Nocte Temporis (Alpha 252)
- 2018: Clérambault: Cantates françaises, with Reinoud Van Mechelen and A Nocte Temporis (Alpha 356)
- 2024: Stravinsky: Pulcinella Suite; Falla: El retablo de Maese Pedro & Harpsichord Concerto, with the Mahler Chamber Orchestra and Pablo Heras-Casado
- 2024: J. S. Bach: A Life in Music, Vol. 1 – Arnstadt & Mühlhausen (1703–1708), Early Cantatas, with Les Arts Florissants and Paul Agnew
- 2025: J. S. Bach: A Life in Music, Vol. 2 – The Weimar Years (1708–1717), with Les Arts Florissants and Paul Agnew
- 2026: J. S. Bach: A Life in Music, Vol. 3 – Köthen (1717–1723), with Les Arts Florissants and Paul Agnew

=== Video recordings ===
- 2013: J. S. Bach: Goldberg Variations, BWV 988 (recorded live at the Journées Musicales d'Automne festival in Souvigny, 28 September 2013 (CD/DVD))

=== Digital releases ===
- 2026: J. S. Bach: Chaconnes, BWV 1178 & 1179
