= Jean-Pierre Ouvrard =

Jean-Pierre Ouvrard (16 February 1948 in Trémentines (Maine-et-Loire) – 13 November 1992 in Tours (Indre-et-Loire)) was a French musicologist, music educator, researcher at the François Rabelais University and choral conductor.

He founded the Ensemble Jacques Moderne in 1973 and the Centre de musique ancienne in Tours in 1991.

== Biography ==
Originally from Anjou and after literary studies at the University of Angers, Jean-Pierre Ouvrard became Tourangeau to satisfy his "bound" passions for music and the Renaissance.

He considered that this historical period had produced a kind of ideal of vocal expression. He studied musicology at the University of Tours in 1970, under Jean-Michel Vaccaro, professor-researcher at the Centre d'études supérieures de la Renaissance of Tours. In 1979, he defended a doctoral thesis on La chanson polyphonique franco-flamande autour de 1530-1550 comme lecture du texte poétique ("Flemish-French-French polyphonic song around 1530-1550 as a reading of the poetic text") and throughout his studies he focused on this "intimate" relationship between text and music.

Jean-Pierre Ouvrard could not content himself with theory alone through musicological study and, above all, to continue his vocal practice, but wanted to revive Renaissance music - an ancient music that had been forgotten or even lost - and to make it resonate again in a region dotted with masterpieces of architecture from the same period.

In November 1973, he founded the university ensemble of early music whose first auditions took place the following month and the first concert, 25 April 1974, in the Amphitheatre of the Faculty of Letters of Tours. An intense activity of dissemination and animation of the heritage opened up in parallel with the university research that he carried out to feed them from this confrontation with the reality of interpretation. Declamation was important for him because the accentuation of the text influenced his interpretation: "By choosing, on the other hand, the restitution of the declamation and the ancient pronunciation, we make the bet that polyphony[...] will find in this apparent archaism the catalyst of its modernity". It is in order to reveal this apparent contradiction that he subsequently gave his ensemble of early music the name of Jacques Moderne, the music publisher of 16th-century Lyon.

In this search for authenticity, he hoped that the works performed would have the same sonorities as at the time of their first performances. Five centuries later, these "old stones" were again animated by the breath of the sackbuts, the vibration of the viols and the voices of the singers, which he directed there.

Despite the significant share of the "Ensemble Jacques Moderne" in his professional activity, Jean-Pierre Ouvrard pursues a brilliant career as a musicologist. From professor of musicology at the "Centre d'études supérieures de la Renaissance" he became director of the Music and Musicology Department of the University of Tours between 1987 and 1989 and organized various symposiums, notably on Josquin Desprez, the Musiciens de Ronsard, Voulons nous parler de Musique à Florence ?... Still with the same aim of reviving early music, he is at the origin and elaborates the Ricercar program of the CESR whose missions, still today, are to collect a collection of Renaissance musical documentary material and to create the means for its valorization. He created the "Centre de musique ancienne" following the symposium Le concert des voix et des instruments de la Renaissance held in the Centre region in 1991. He wants to make it a complementary tool for the dissemination of concerts in the service of early music.. This center was also intended to disseminate musicological discoveries through musical publishing and the organization of colloquia, the most emblematic of which was devoted to women musicians.

This dual status, as a specialist in Renaissance polyphony and artistic director, allows him to be invited to work in various centres or places dedicated to polyphony in France, notably for the Institut de Musique Ancienne de Saintes. He is also called upon to write numerous program notes and record libretto for prestigious ensembles specialized in the interpretation of these music, such as la Chapelle Royale directed by Philippe Herreweghe, and also the Ensemble Clément Janequin conducted by Dominique Visse. His writings - conference proceedings, monographs or thematic studies - are still references in these field today.

Jean-Pierre Ouvrard summed up his own career path as follows: "Around what I try to do in the various aspects of my work as a musician and academic, there is a great deal of coherence. Thanks to these different structures present in Tours, there is a very strong complex linked to Renaissance music that advocates that the Centre-Val de Loire region become a centre of excellence for Renaissance music." There is no doubt that today the ancient music owes much to him and that it has radiated in the musical landscape in general, well beyond the Loire Valley.

== Selected bibliography ==
- Jean-Pierre Ouvrard, Josquin Desprez et ses contemporains : de l'écrit au sonore, guide pratique d'interprétation, Actes Sud, Arles, 1986, 166 p. ISBN 2868690882
- Jean-Pierre Ouvrard, La Chanson polyphonique française du XVIe siècle : Guide Pratique, avec la collaboration de Jacques Barbier, Paris, Centre d'études polyphonique et chorale de Paris et Centre d'art polyphonique de Bourgogne, 1982 and reprinted in 1997

== Discography ==
=== Ensemble Jacques Moderne ===
- Chants de la révolution française, (Livre-cassette), Le Livre de Poche, 1989
- Francisco Guerrero, Motets et Missa de La Battalla Escoutez, Musica Nova, 1990
- Claude Lejeune, Motets Latins, Musica Nova, 1991
- Guillaume Boni, Motets, Musica Nova, 1992
- Josquin Desprez, Missa D'ung aultre amer, Missa Malheur me bat, (Livre Disque), posthumous, 2013
