= Bruno Boterf =

French singer

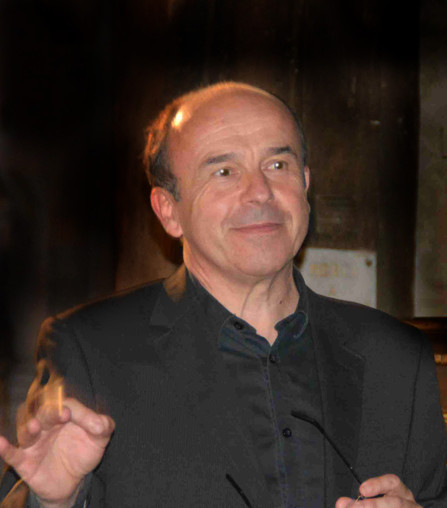
Bruno Boterf

Bruno Boterf is a contemporary French tenor, specialising in Baroque and early music.

== Biography ==
Boterf began his career within the Ensemble Venance Fortunat and the Groupe Vocal de France before joining the Ensemble Clément Janequin of which he was a member until 2007. Holder of the Certificate of Aptitude for Ancient Music, Boterf has taught at the RRC of Tours, the Royal Conservatory of Liège and the Conservatoire national supérieur de musique et de danse de Lyon where he has been a singing teacher specialized in early music. He regularly teaches courses and master classes on singing and Renaissance music polyphony at conservatories and polyphonic centres.

He is regularly called upon to lead projects involving singers and instrumentalists in the pre-baroque and baroque repertoire (sacred music by Henry Du Mont with the choir of Namur, motets and psalms by Praetorius, Vespers by Monteverdi, Bach's cantatas and Mass in B minor). This pedagogical practice led him to create the Ensemble Ludus Modalis, made up of a dozen singers A capella, whose repertoire mainly covers the period of sacred music from the Renaissance and early Baroque periods.

Boterf has recorded many disks both for the following companies Harmonia Mundi, Alpha, Erato Records, CBS, Auvidis and Ramée with the Ensemble Ludus Modalis and also Ricercar for the first two components of an Henry Du Mont (1610–1684) project.

== Selected discography ==
With A Doi tenori (and Gilles Ragon)

- 1999: Giacomo Carissimi and Girolamo Frescobaldi: Duetti da chiesa nella Roma del Primo seicento (Label: L'empreinte digitale)

With Akadêmia

- 1991: Claudio Monteverdi: Vespro della beata vergine
- 1993: Francesco Cavalli: Missa pro defunctis
- 1994: Palestrina: Vergine bella: motets et madrigaux

With the Ensemble Clément-Janequin at Harmonia Mundi

- 1984: Heinrich Schütz: the Seven Last Words
- 1988: Clément Janequin: la Chasse et autres chansons
- 1988: Josquin Desprez: Chansons
- 1989: Pierre de La Rue: Messe L'homme armé - Requiem
- 1992: Roland de Lassus: Chansons
- 1994: Une fête chez Rabelais
- 1994: Chansons sur des poèmes de Ronsard
- 2000: Psaumes et chansons de la Réforme
- 2003: Antoine Brumel : Messe et ecce terrae motus

With Les Arts florissants

- 1990: Marc-Antoine Charpentier: Le Malade imaginaire

With Georges Guillard

- 1996: Jehan Alain, vocal and instrumental works (vol. 2) (ARION, ARN 68321). Orphée d’Or, Grand Prix de l’Académie du Disque Lyrique 1996

With the Chœur de chambre de Namur as musical director

- 2009: Henry Du Mont: Cantica sacra (Label Ricercar)
- 2011: Henry Du Mont: Pour les Dames religieuses (Label Ricercar)

With the Chœur de chambre de Namur direction Jean Tubéry

- 2008: Marc-Antoine Charpentier: Te Deum

With Les Sacqueboutiers of Toulouse

- 1997: Giovanni Martino Cesare: Musicali Melodie (Label Accord)

With the William Byrd's European ensemble, direction Graham Reilly

- 2007: Giacomo Carissimi : Jephte Music in Roma circa 1640 (Label: Passacaille)

With the orchestre Les Passions direction Jean Marc Andrieu

- 2008: Jean Gilles: Requiem (Label Ligia Digital)
- 2010: Jean Gilles : Lamentations (Label Ligia Digital)

With the Ensemble Ludus Modalis direction Bruno Boterf

- 2004: An improvised mass: Une messe pour la Saint-Michel et tous les saints anges with Freddy Eichelberger and Michel Godard. (Label: Alpha)
- 2007: Paschal de L'Estocart: Sacrae Cantiones: songs, ode, psalms and motets from 3 to 7 voices Diapason d'or (Ramée)
- 2010: Claude Le Jeune: Dix Psaumes de David de 1564 Diapason d'or (March 2011) (Ramée)
- 2011: Giovanni Pierluigi da Palestrina: Stabat mater
- 2011: Roland de Lassus: Biographie Musicale Année de Jeunesse (Label: Musique en Wallonie)
- 2013: Guillaume Costeley: Mignonne allons voir si la rose (Ramée)
