= Bruno Ducol =

French composer (1949–2024)

- Bruno Ducol, c. 2000
- Born: 22 March 1949; Annonay, France
- Died: 11 January 2024 (aged 74); Paris, France
- Education: Conservatoire de Paris
- Occupations: Composer; Academic teacher

Bruno Ducol (22 March 1949 – 11 January 2024) was a French pianist, composer and teacher of contemporary music.

== Life and career ==
Born on 22 March 1949 in Annonay, Ducol trained as a pianist and also studied philosophy and musicology at the University of Montpellier from 1967 to 1970. He then studied at the Conservatoire de Lyon. From 1973 to 1980 he studied at the Conservatoire de Paris, analysis with Claude Ballif, electroacoustic with Pierre Schaeffer, and composition with Olivier Messiaen and André Boucourechliev.

He taught analysis and orchestration as a professor at the Conservatoire national de région de Reims from 1978 to 1998, and also at the summer school of the State University of Campinas in 1980. He was resident at the Villa Medici from 1981 to 1983, and at the Casa Velázquez in Madrid from 1985 to 1987. He was a fellow of the Fondation Beaumarchais in the Chartreuse de Villeneuve-lez-Avignon from 1990 to 1992. He was composer in residence at the Conservatoire de Lyon in 1994 and 1995, and then taught analysis at the Conservatoire de Paris until 2014. He travelled repeatedly to Greece, South America, Moscow and China. His compositions were influenced by encounters with artists such as choreographer Rocco, writer Clarisse Nicoïdski, stage director Jean-Claude Penchenat and visual artist Olivier Turpin.

In 2015 he won the René Dumesnil Composition Prize from the Académie des beaux-arts.

Ducol died in Paris on 11 January 2024, at the age of 74, after a battle with illness for two years.

== Work ==
Ducol was influenced by Greek music, particularly rhythm and meter. He defined music as "the manifestation of a natural pulsation and rhythm". His compositions, for different ensembles, are inspired by Antiquity, exotic music, nature, poetry and visual arts.

His works include the orchestral Métalayi I (1976), Des Scènes d’Enfants for flute and guitar (1984), the opera Praxitèle (1986), A Korinne for string quartet (1988), Six études de rhythme for piano (1992), Éclats de lune (1995), Les Cerceaux de feu (2000), Vibrations chromatics for two pianos (2001 - including 'Nu descendant un escalier'), Fantasme en rouge for female chorus (2006), Treize fenêtres, rhythmic studies for two pianos (2006), Une griffure de lumière for orchestra (2009) and Für die Jugend for voice and percussion (2010).

== Recordings ==
- Le cri, for countertenor, tenor, baritone and bass, in L'écrit du cri of vocal music from the Renaissance and the 19th to 21st centuries, Ensemble Clément-Janequin, conducted by Dominique Visse (2008, HM) OCLC 378339268
- Vibrations chromatiques, Op. 26; Treize fenêtres, Op. 33 – Charlotte Gauthier, Tanguy de Williencourt, Delphine Armand, Yun-ho Chen, pianos; Fred Cacheux, voince; Charlotte Gauthier, Tanguy de Williencourt, Florian Chabbert, Marie Duquesnois, Victor Hanna, pianos; Adele Carlier, percussion; Bruno Ducol, bande (2019, Hortus) OCLC 1137323051
- Adonaïs ou l'air et les songes, Op. 47 four voice and string quartet; À Corinna n° II, Op. 18 for string quartet; Hymne au soleil, Op. 46 for flute and string trio; Tout le jaune se meurt, Op. 48bis for soprano – Quatuor Bela; Laura Holm, soprano; Julie Brunet-Jailly, flute (2020, Klarthe K092) OCLC 1245184115
