= Ensemble Clément Janequin =

The Ensemble Clément Janequin is a French early music ensemble founded in 1978 and specializing in the chansons of the Renaissance and early Baroque.

The founder, and leader, is the countertenor Dominique Visse. The group has recorded almost exclusively for the Harmonia Mundi label of the late Bernard Coutaz since its inception.

An early line up of the Ensemble in 1985, for the Meslanges recording, included Josep Cabré (Baritone), Philippe Cantor (Baritone), Michel Laplénie (Tenor), Gérard Lesne (Haute Contre), Agnès Mellon (Soprano), Antoine Sicot (Bass) and direction Dominique Visse. Cabré, Laplénie, and Lesne all subsequently founded their own ensembles, as well as Bruno Boterf (tenor) who was a member of the Ensemble from 1987 to 2007 before founding his own vocal ensemble, Ludus Modalis.

The ensemble has recorded very little modern music but in 2009 recorded a selection of 19th-century and modern compositions extending the tradition of the renaissance genre of Les Cris de Paris entitled L'écrit du Cri. This collection featured Jean-Georges Kastner (1810–1867), Alfred Roland (fl. 1840), Alfred Lebeau (1835–1906), Louis-Édouard Deransart (d.1905), Vincent Scotto (1876–1952) and several contemporary French and Belgian composers; Claude Ledoux, Bruno Ducol (1949–2024), Vincent Bouchot (b. 1966), Régis Campo (b. 1968).

== Selected discography ==
- 198? - Sermisy: Leçons de ténèbres. Harmonia Mundi reedition 2004 HMX 2901131.
- 1982 - Paschal de l'Estocart Octonaires de la vanité du monde. Harmonia Mundi 1901110.
- 1982 - Les Cris de Paris. Chansons de Janequin et Sermisy. Harmonia Mundi HMA 195 1072.
- 1983 - Janequin: Le chant des Oyseaulx. Harmonia Mundi HMC 90 1099.
- 1984 - Anthoine de Bertrand Amours de Ronsard. Harmonia Mundi 1901147.
- 1985 - Fricassée Parisienne. Chansons de la Renaissance française. Harmonia Mundi HMA 195 1174.
- 1985 - Claude Le Jeune Meslanges. Ensemble Clément Janequin and Ensemble Les Eléments. Harmonia Mundi 1901182.
- 1986 - Josquin: Missa Pange lingua. Ensemble Clément Janequin and Ensemble Organum. Harmonia Mundi HMC 90 1239.
- 1986 - Psaumes du XVIème. Ensemble Clément Janequin and Ensemble Les Eléments. Cascavelle 1001.
- 1987 - Heinrich Schütz Die sieben Worte Jesu Christi am Kreutz. Ensemble Clément Janequin and Les Saqueboutiers de Toulouse. Harmonia Mundi 1951255.
- 1988 - Janequin: La Chasse et autres chansons. Harmonia Mundi HMC 90 1271.
- 1988 - Josquin Desprez: Adieu mes amours - Chansons. Ensemble Clément Janequin and Ensemble Les Eléments. Harmonia Mundi HMA 195 1279.
- 1989 - Pierre de la Rue: Missa "L'homme armé". Requiem. Harmonia Mundi HMA 195 1296.
- 1991 - Les Plaisirs du Palais. Chansons à boire de la Renaissance. Harmonia Mundi 901729.
- 1991 - Lassus: Chansons and moresche. Harmonia Mundi HMA 195 1391.
- 1992 - Banchieri: Barca di Venetia per Padova. Harmonia Mundi 901281.
- 1993 - Vecchi: L'Amfiparnaso. Harmonia Mundi HMA 195 1461.
- 1993 - Chansons sur des poèmes de Ronsard. Songs on poems by Ronsard by François Regnard, Guillaume Boni, Jean de Castro and royal lutenist Albert de Rippe Harmonia Mundi 1951491.
- 1994 - Une Fête chez Rabelais. Chansons et pièces instrumentales. Harmonia Mundi HMX 298 1453.
- 1995 - Janequin: Missa "La Bataille". Missa "L'aveuglé Dieu". Harmonia Mundi HMA 190 1536.
- 1996 - Le Jeune: Missa "Ad Placitum". Magnificat. Harmonia Mundi 901607.
- 1997 - Canciones y Ensaladas. Chansons et pièces instrumentales du Siècle d'Or. Harmonia Mundi HMC 90 1627.
- 1998 - Psaumes et Chansons de la Réforme. Harmonia Mundi HMC 90 1672.
- 2003 - Brumel: Missa Et ecce terrae motus. Ensemble Clément Janequin and Les Sacqueboutiers de Toulouse. Harmonia Mundi 901738.
- 2005 - Claude Le Jeune Autant en emporte le vent Chansons. Harmonia Mundi HMC 90 1863.
- 2010 - Rabelais - Fay ce que vouldras with readings in French from Pantagruel. Les Sacqueboutiers de Toulouse. Kelys / Flora.

== See also ==
- List of early music ensembles
