= Ensemble Jacques Moderne =

The Ensemble Jacques Moderne, directed by Joël Suhubiette, is a choir performing mainly the Renaissance and Baroque repertoire. It is located in Tours. The Ensemble was founded by Jean-Pierre Ouvrard in Tours in 1974, and has been directed by Joël Suhubiette since 1993.

== Discography ==
=== Under the direction of Joël Suhubiette ===
- François Regnard, Motets, Calliope, 1995 (8 Répertoire, 5 Diapason, 'CHOC' of Le Monde de la musique)
- Marco da Gagliano, Motets, Calliope, 1995 (8 Répertoire, 5 Diapasons, 4 stars Monde de la Musique)
- Clément Janequin, La Bataille de Marignan, Calliope, 1996
- Giovanni Bassano, Motets, Calliope, 1997 (Palmarès du Prix International Antonio Vivaldi de Venise (1997), 8 Répertoire, 5 Diapasons, 4 stars Monde de la Musique)
- Eustache Du Caurroy, Requiem, Calliope, 2000 (9 Répertoire, 4 Diapasons, 4 stars Goldberg)
- François Couperin, Messe des Paroisses, Olivier Vernet, Ligia, 2000 (6 Répertoire, 5 Diapasons, 4 stars Monde de la Musique, 4 stars Goldberg)
- Pierre Tabart, Requiem, Magnificat, Te Deum, Jean Tubéry, Virgin Veritas, 2001 (7 Répertoire, 5 Diapasons)
- Cristóbal de Morales, Francisco Guerrero, De Beata Virgine, Ligia, 2001 (8 Répertoire, 4 Diapasons, 5 Classica)
- Nicolas De Grigny, Livre d’orgue, Olivier Vernet, Ligia, 2003 (ffff Télérama, 9 Répertoire, 5 Diapasons, 4 Stars Monde de la Musique, exceptional record hifi-video)
- Giacomo Carissimi, Jephté, Jonas, Ligia, 2003 (7 de Répertoire, 5 Diapasons, 4 stars Monde de la Musique)
- Jean Mouton, Motets, Ligia, 2003 (5 Diapasons, 5 de Classica, Choc du Monde de la Musique, excellent record hifi-video)
- Dietrich Buxtehude, Jesu, meine Freude, Ligia, 2007 (5 Diapasons)
- Domenico Scarlatti, Stabat Mater - Messe de Madrid, Ligia, 2010 (Ring de ClassiqueInfo, 4 Diapasons, Muse d’or de Musebaroque.fr)

=== Under the direction of Jean-Pierre Ouvrard ===
- 1989: Chants de la révolution française, (Book-cassette), Le Livre de Poche
- 1990: Francisco Guerrero, Motets et Missa de La Battalla Escoutez, Musica Nova
- 1991: Claude Lejeune, Motets Latins, Musica Nova
- 1992: Guillaume Boni, Motets, Musica Nova
- 2013: Josquin Desprez, Missa D'ung aultre amer, Missa Malheur me bat, (Book record), Posthumous
