= Alexander Utendal =

Flemish composer

Alexander Utendal (1543/45 – 7 May 1581) was a Flemish composer.

== Life ==
Utendal was a native of Ghent, nowadays a Belgian city, but at the time part of Flanders and the Netherlands which were part of the Holy Roman Empire. Like many Flemish musicians and composers of his time, he served the Imperial family, the Habsburgs. He began already at a young age as a choirboy at the court of Mary of Hungary, sister of emperors Charles V and Ferdinand I of the Holy Roman Empire. She was given the position of Vogt (regent) of the Netherlands.

In 1564, Utendal became alto of the court chapel of Archduke Ferdinand II of Tyrol, another member of the royal Habsburg family. After Ferdinand was made Archduke of Further Austria in 1564 after his father's death, he moved his court from Prague (he was the governor of Bohemia) to Innsbruck. Utendal followed his master to the Innsbruck court chapel to gain the position of vice chapel master in 1572 (as successor of Jacob Regnart); he was also in charge of the education of the choir boys.

Until 1581, Utendal worked for Ferdinand II in Innsbruck, where he died. Many of his works are in honour of his master. He even refused the position of chapel master at the court of Dresden in 1580.

== Music ==
Due to his position as vice-chapel master he mostly composed sacred works, although there are also two books known with French and German non-sacred songs. In his work the alto (high voice) is almost always the dominant one, maybe because he was an alto himself. He also used the madrigal fashion in his compositions, which is typical for the late or High Renaissance. All the original sacred compositions of Utendal still exist and they are conserved in many archives and libraries throughout Europe. His works were published in Nuremberg, in this time the most important centre of the German music press. Utendal wrote eighty-four motets.

== Publications ==
- 1570: Septem psalmi poenitentiales for four voices (published by Dietrich Gerlach)
- 1571: Sacrae cantiones for four, five, six or more voices
- 1573: Collection of German songs
- 1573: Three masses for five/six voices
- 1573: Acht magnificat for four voices
- 1573: Sacrae cantiones for four, five, six or more voices
- 1574: Collection of French songs
- 1577: Sacrae cantiones for four, five, six or more voices
- 1586: Responsoria
