= Château Moncade =

Ruined castle in Nouvelle-Aquitaine, France

- Orthez, Pyrénées-Atlantiques, France
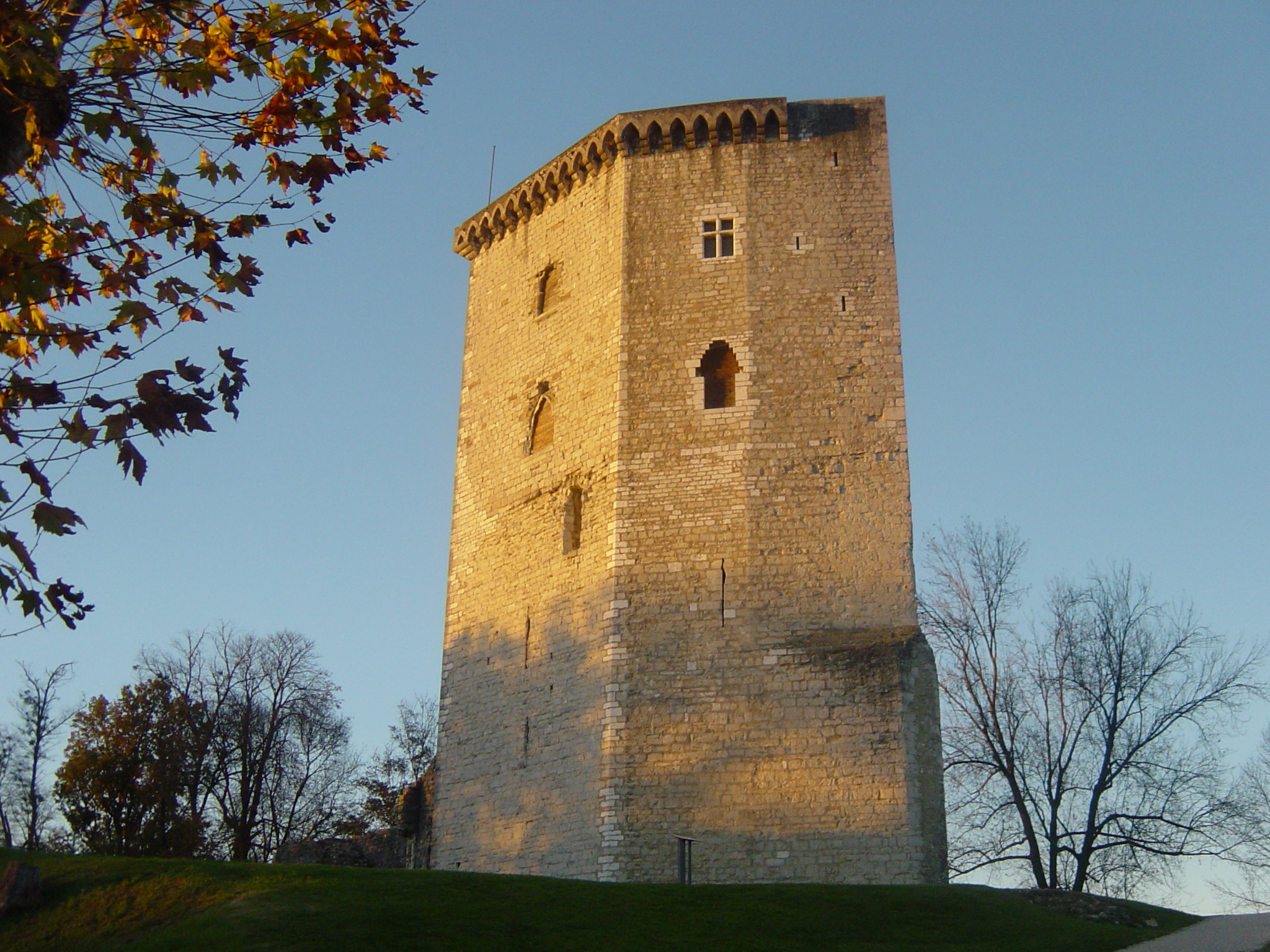
- La tour Moncade

Site information
- Owner: Commune
- Open to the public: Yes
- Condition: Preserved

Location
- Coordinates: 43°29′31″N 0°46′13″W
- Height: 33 metres (108 ft)

Site history
- Built: From 1242
- Built by: Gaston VII, Viscount of Béarn
- Materials: Stone
- Demolished: 18th century

The Château Moncade is a ruined castle in the commune of Orthez in the Pyrénées-Atlantiques département of France.

== History ==
Construction of the castle was started in 1242 by the Gaston VII, Viscount of Béarn (the keep, known as the tour de Moncade) taking advantage of the absence of Edward III. When the King returned, Gaston was imprisoned and had to swear allegiance before being released. He subsequently reneged.

It was the residence of the Kings of Béarn when their capital was Orthez. Standing on top of a hill above the town, it afforded views of the surrounding county over a radius of more than 30 kilometres (19 mi). The central tower was surrounded by high curtain walls and moats up to 15 metres (49 ft) deep. Entry was by a drawbridge.

In the 14th century, Gaston Phébus, Count of Foix, altered it between 1368 and 1375.

The castle was burned during the Wars of Religion in 1569. It was sold during the French Revolution to dismantlers who largely demolished the curtain wall.

The only remains are the keep (in a good state of preservation), the moats (in course of restoration) and remnants of the curtain wall. It has been listed since 1840 as a monument historique by the French Ministry of Culture.

== Visits ==
The castle is open to the public (paying) and contains, among other items, a model of the site.

== Gallery ==
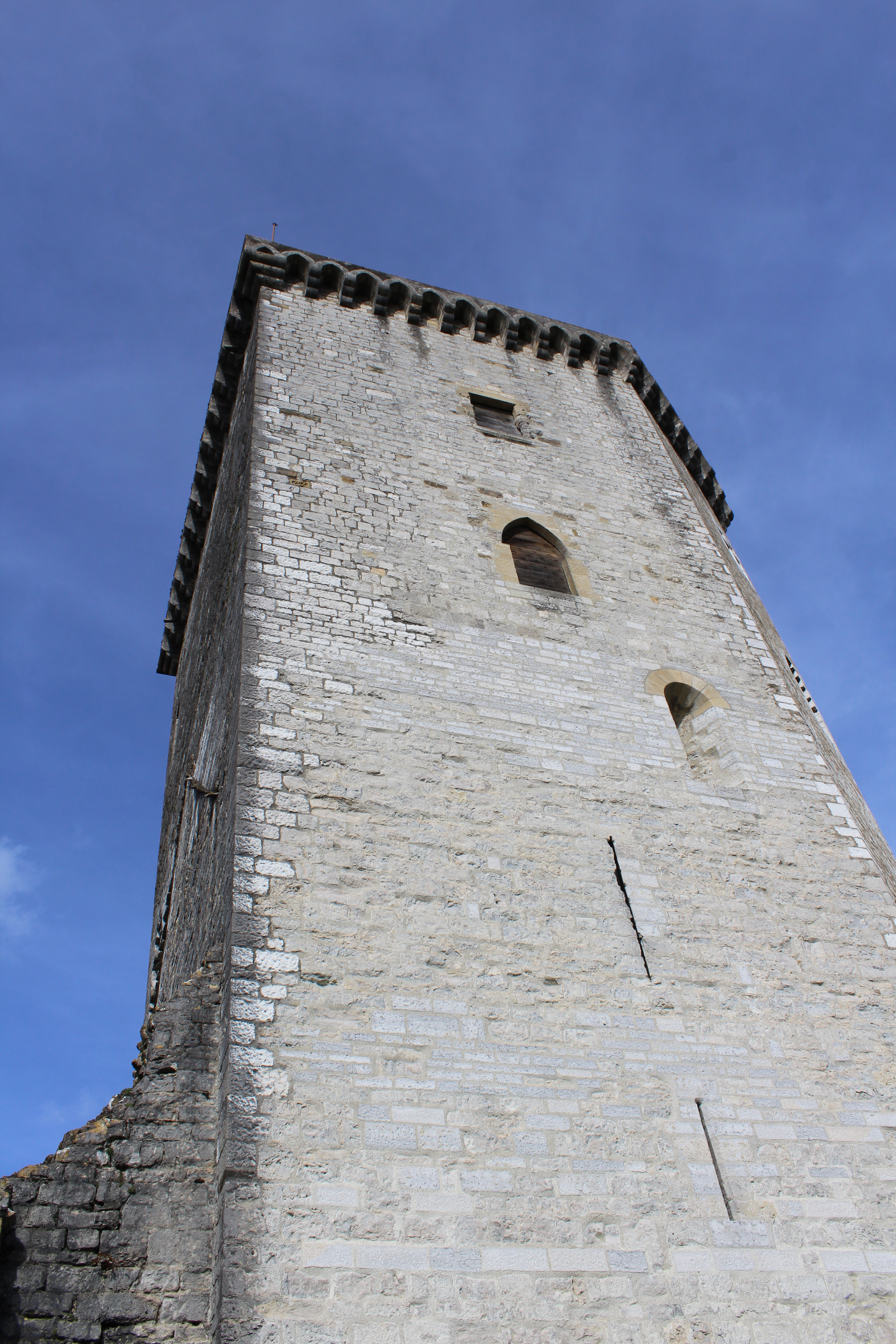
The tower of Château Moncade

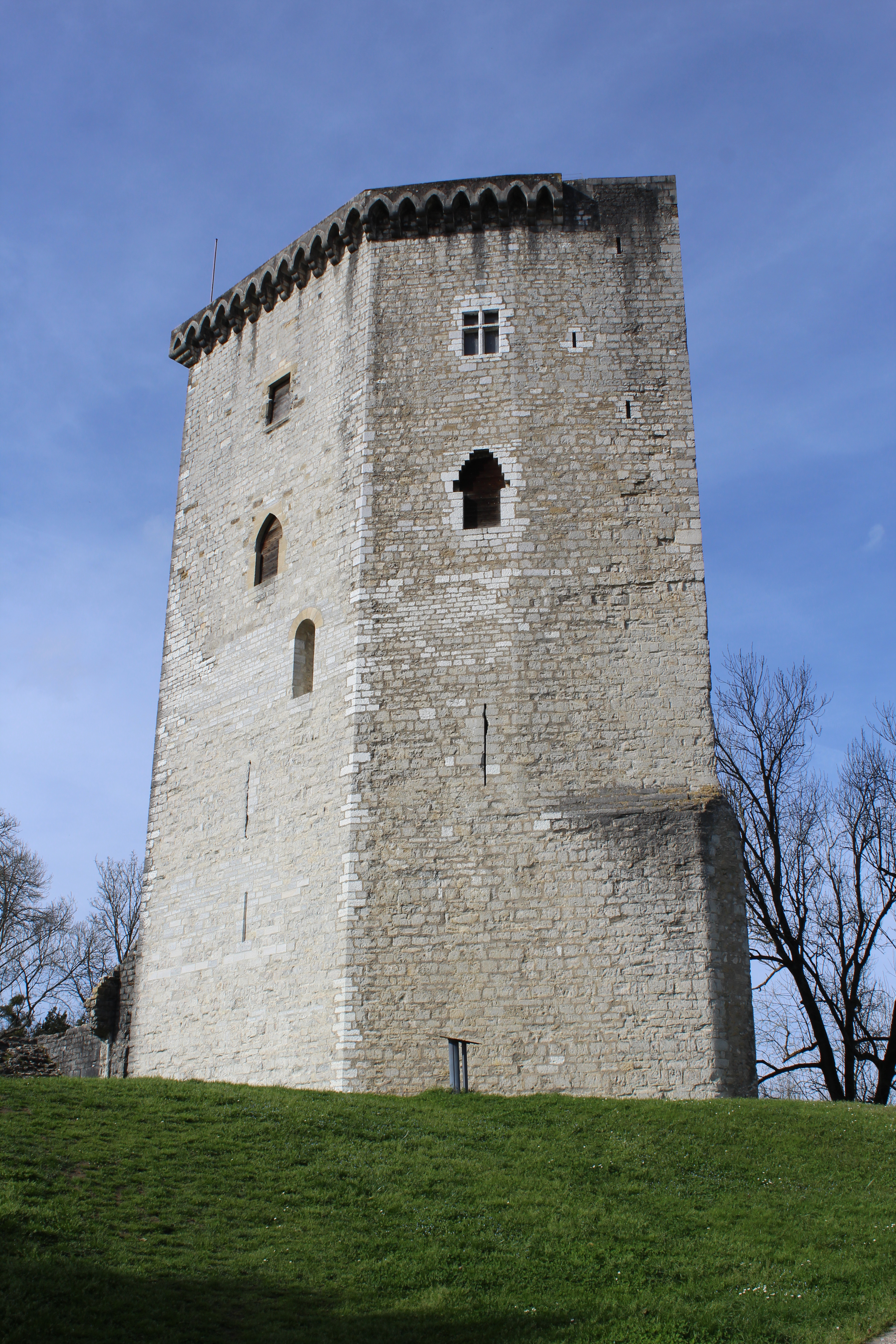
The tower of Château Moncade

== See also ==
- List of castles in France
