= Alain Mabit =

Alain Mabit is a titular organist of the Grand Organ Cavaillé-Coll of the Église Saint-Étienne de Caen, and 20th century music writing teacher at the Conservatoire de Paris. He is also a composer.

Mabit studied organ with Louis Thiry at the Conservatoire à rayonnement régional de Rouen, André Isoir at the Conservatoire de Boulogne and musical composition with Olivier Messiaen and Claude Ballif at the Conservatoire de Paris.

== Works ==
- Night songs for organ.
- Sphère d’influence for wind ensemble.
- Segments for organ.

== Discography ==
- Prélude et Fugue sur BACH (Franz Liszt)
- Trois préludes de choral of the Opus 122 by Brahms
- Toccata (Charles-Marie Widor) organ of the Abbaye aux hommes at Caen
