= Bernard Coutaz =

French music publisher

Bernard Coutaz (30 December 1922 – 26 February 2010) was a French musical publisher, founder of the Harmonia Mundi label.

Coutaz was born into a working-class family in Saint-Auban-sur-l'Ouvèze and studied at the Salesians of Don Bosco, but was asked to leave in 1945, during his novitiate, for having organized a Marxist study group. In the 1950s he became a journalist with Groupe Bayard, then 'Témoignage chrétien. During this period Coutaz published four novels and was an editor at Éditions ouvrières.

At some time during this period Bernard Coutaz met Rudolf Ruby, a German sharing Coutaz' interests first in books, later in music. In 1958 Coutaz founded Harmonia Mundi (France), an independent label specializing in classical music in Paris with 26,50F in the bank. In the same year, or 1959, Rudolf Ruby founded Deutsche Harmonia Mundi (DHM) in Freiburg-im-Breisgau. The name Harmonia Mundia was shared and each distributed the recordings of the other. The link was maintained until first BASF, then EMI, bought into the German label, then finally (after Ruby retired in 1993), DHM became part of BMG and then Sony.

In 1962 Coutaz relocated to Saint-Michel-l'Observatoire in Provence. The label's first recording was of Slavonic liturgy sung by French monks. This was followed by a series dedicated to historic organs, for which Coutaz toured France, Spain and Germany with his recording equipment in his Citroën 2CV. A significant breakthrough occurred after hearing Alfred Deller in concert at Avignon. In a much recounted story Coutaz drove Deller to his farm, and after a night of music, wine and goat's cheese, by dawn Deller was convinced to join the Harmonia Mundi label. Deller's account of their first meeting, shows Coutaz' initial approach to artist management.

"Then in 1967 the [Deller] Consort was giving a concert in Avignon and Bernard Coutaz, head of Harmonia Mundi, came up afterwards and said he'd really like to record us. We arranged things so as to start a small company within a company, Deller Records. I would be the artistic director, Coutaz would handle the business..."

The success of Deller's recordings, and the artist-first management style of Coutaz and his wife Eva, attracted other loyal recording artists among them Philippe Herreweghe, René Jacobs, and the Ensemble Clément Janequin. Coutaz also published the early recordings of Les Arts Florissants of William Christie. Many of Konrad Junghänel's first recordings were with Harmonia Mundi, to whom his Cantus Cölln came from DHM-BMG in 1997. Andreas Scholl was another artist to start with, then return to, Harmonia Mundi.

Harmonia Mundia U.S.A. was set up in 1982 to distribute and later record and manage artists in North America, among them Anonymous 4. Harmonia mundi Ibèrica performs a similar role in Spain and Portugal, as distributor and producer of local recordings such as Toldra's Catalan zarzuela El giravolt de maig. Éditions Bernard Coutaz publishes music books and fiction.

Bernard Coutaz was made Chevalier of the Légion d'honneur in 1993 and officier of the Ordre des Arts et des Lettres. In 2009 he was awarded a Special Award by Gramophone Magazine. He died in Arles in 2010.

== Works ==
Novels:

- 1952: Les dents agacées. Éditions de Témoignage chrétien (Paris)
- 1953: Quand les ventres parlent. Éditions de Témoignage chrétien (Paris)
- 1955: Civilisations, je vous hais! Éditions de la Table ronde.
- 1956: La Peur du gendarme. Éditions ouvrières.

Journalism:

- 1956: Des "filles" vous parlent. Colette Coutaz, Bernard Coutaz, André Malary.

Significant recordings:

- 1958 Chants de la Liturgie slavonne: Choeur des Moines de Chevetogne - Dom Grégoire Bainbridge, O.S.B., dir. Harmonia mundi HMO 30.567 LP, mono.
- 1959- Orgues historiques d'Europe. Organists including Francis Chapelet, Michel Chapuis and René Saorgin.
- Purcell King Arthur. Alfred Deller
- Series: Harmonia Mundi Les Nouveaux Interprètes - debut recordings of young artists.
