= François Regnard =

French composer

François Regnard (or Regnart; Douai, fl. 1570s) was a French Renaissance composer. He studied, sang, and later was maître de chapelle at Tournai Cathedral. He is mainly remembered for his settings of Ronsard's chansons.

He was one of five composer brothers of whom the best known was Jacques or Jacob Regnart who spent most of his career in the service of Habsburg emperors Maximilian II and Rudolf II and Archduke Ferdinand in Vienna, Prague and Innsbruck. Two more, Charles and Pascal, were in the chapel of Philip II of Spain. Another brother, Augustin, was canon at Lille. It was Augustin who in 1590 published works of the four other brothers; François as "Franciscus Regnart", Jacobus Regnart, Pascasius Regnart, Carolus Regnart in Novae cantiones sacrae, quator, quinque et sex vocum.

== Selected recordings ==
- Ronsard et les Néerlandais Egidius Kwartet (Etcetera)
- Chansons de Ronsard Ensemble Clement Janequin (HMA)
- Novae Cantionaes 1590 Ensemble Jacques Moderne, Joël Suhubiette, Calliope
