= Jean de Castro =

Belgian composer

Jean de Castro (Liège, c. 1540 – 1611) was a composer from an area then part of the Holy Roman Empire. Although he has virtually been forgotten in the revival of renaissance music he was during his life second only to Lassus in his popularity according to the Antwerp printer-publisher Christophe Plantin.

Despite the Spanish-sounding name Castro was a local from Liège, referred to as "nostre Castro" by the poet Etienne de Walcourt. He worked in Antwerp in the 1570s and was maitre de chapelle to the Duke of Juliers, Liège, in 1580.

== Works ==
- Chansons, odes, et sonetz de Pierre Ronsard 1576; performing edition Jeanice Brooks 1994
- Free scores by Jean de Castro in the Choral Public Domain Library (ChoralWiki)

== Recordings ==
- Chansons sur des poèmes de Ronsard: Ensemble Clément Janequin, Dominique Visse. Harmonia Mundi
- 7 Motets (Decantabat populus Israel, Resurrexi et adhuc tecum sum, Afflictus sum, O sacrum convivum, Judica me Domine and Regina Coeli) on Musica Sacra in Colonia, Cologne Musica Fiata, La Capella Ducale, Roland Wilson.
- 2000 - Jean de Castro: Polyphony in a European Perspective. Capilla Flamenca with More Maiorum, Piffaro, Trigon-Project, Wim Diepenhorst and Bart Demuyt. Passacaille 931.
