= Les Éléments =

Les Éléments is a professional chamber choir established in Toulouse in 1997 by choirmaster Joël Suhubiette.

The choir has sung commissioned works by contemporary composers including Zad Moultaka, Patrick Burgan and Philippe Hersant.

Les Éléments have worked with instrumental ensembles such as the Chambre Philharmonique (under Emmanuel Krivine ), Le Cercle de l'Harmonie (under Jérémie Rhorer), the Orchestre national du Capitole de Toulouse (under Tugan Sokhiev), and Les Talens Lyriques (under Christophe Rousset) in interpretation of choral works from the classical repertoire. This has encompassed Mozart's Requiem, cantatas, motets and the Mass in B minor by Johann Sebastian Bach, Fauré's Requiem, and the Nelson Mass by Joseph Haydn.

Les Éléments were awarded in the Victoires de la Musique of 2006 in the classification of a classical music ensemble.
