= Isabelle Oehmichen =

French classical pianist

Isabelle Oehmichen (born 9 March 1961) is a French classical pianist.

== Biography ==
Born in Paris, Oehmichen is First Grand Prize winner of the 1989 International Piano Competition Milosz Magin and in 1993 Laureate of the Foundation Georges Cziffra. She was destined for classical dance, her passion, but after a broken ankle, she started playing the piano at 17. She began as a pianist at the Paris Opera and accompanied the danseurs étoile Noëlla Pontois, Patrick Dupond, and Michael Denard.

Oehmichen plays as a soloist throughout Europe and particularly in Central Europe. Every year she gives recitals, concerts in chamber music or with orchestra. She participates in radio and television programs (recitals filmed in Żelazowa Wola, the native home of Chopin and Saint-Saëns's 2nd concerto at the Franz Liszt Academy in Budapest live on Bartók Radio).

Oehmichen has recorded several CDs of works by Chopin, Magin, Sauguet, Collet, Liszt, concertos with orchestra by Weiner, Wissmer, Mozart, Dohnanyi.

She is also artistic director of the A.M.F.H. (Association Musicale Franco-Hongroise) in Paris.

Attached to teaching amateur adults, Oehmichen created with the Hungarian conductor Weninger Richárd an International Summer Academy of Chamber Music in Budapest, open to all. She also founded the Trio Primavera, Franco-Hungarian trio (piano, violin and cello) which performs regularly in France and Hungary in particular.

From 24 to 26 September 2009, Oehmichen recorded at the 4'33" studio in Ivry-sur-Seine a set of nocturnes by Carl Czerny (1791-1857) (Éditions Hortus, 2010).
