= Orthez =

- Commune
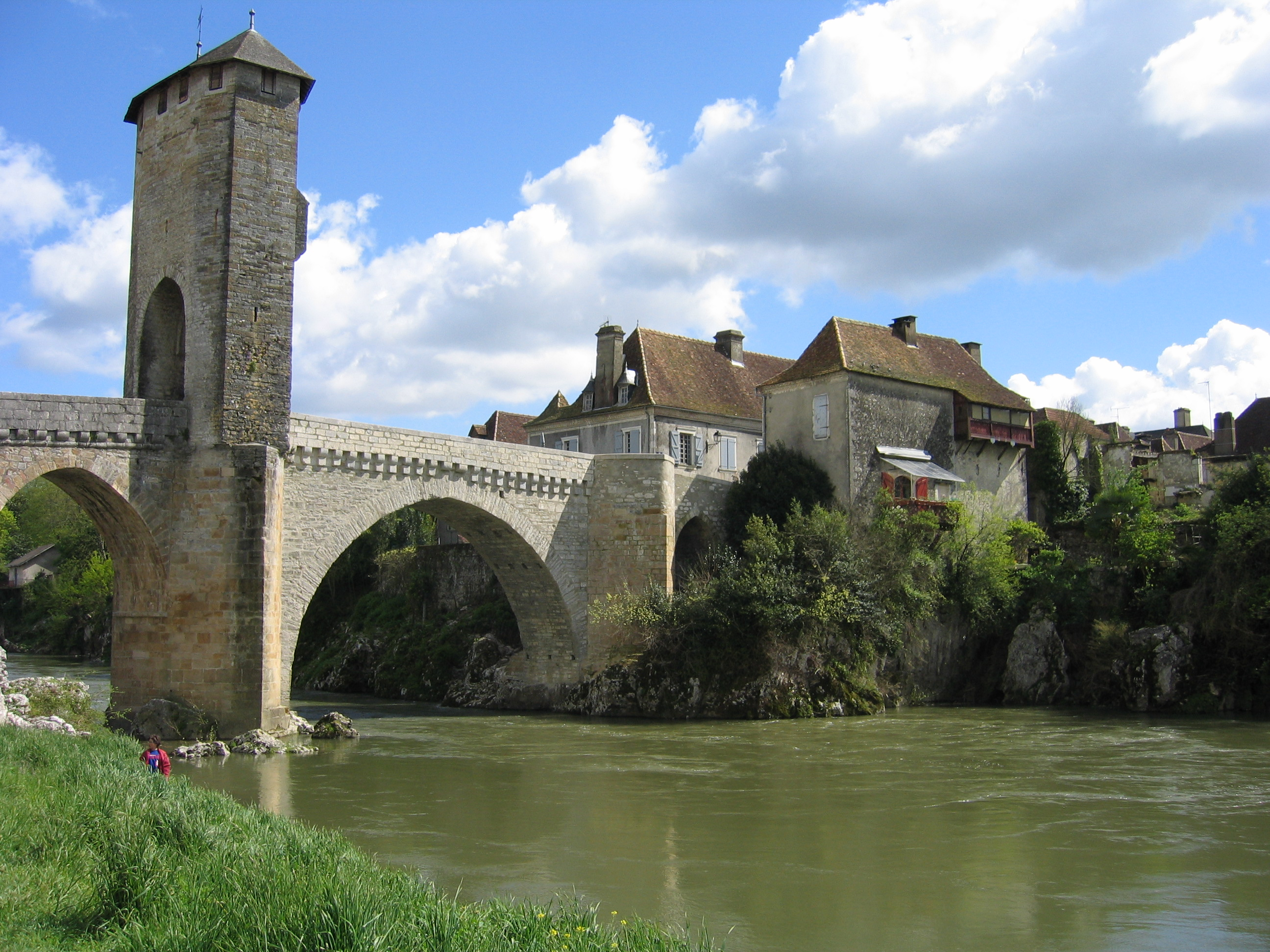
- Bridge over the Gave de Pau

- Coat of arms
- Location of Orthez
- Location within France Location within Nouvelle-Aquitaine
- Coordinates: 43°29′N 0°46′W
- Country: France
- Region: Nouvelle-Aquitaine
- Department: Pyrénées-Atlantiques
- Arrondissement: Pau
- Canton: Orthez et Terres des Gaves et du Sel
- Intercommunality: Lacq-Orthez

Government
  - Mayor (2020–2026): Emmanuel Hanon
- Area^{1}: 45.86 km^{2} (17.71 sq mi)
- Elevation: 62 m (203 ft)
- Highest elevation: 185 m (607 ft)
- Lowest elevation: 38 m (125 ft)
- Population (2023): 10,881
  - Density: 237.3/km^{2} (614.5/sq mi)
- Time zone: UTC+01:00 (CET)
  - Summer (DST): UTC+02:00 (CEST)
- INSEE/Postal code: 64430 /64300
- ^{1} French Land Register data, which excludes lakes, ponds, glaciers > 1 km^{2} (0.386 sq mi or 247 acres) and river estuaries.

Orthez (French pronunciation: [ɔʁtɛs]; Basque: Ortheze; Occitan: Ortès, pronounced [urˈtɛs]) is a commune in the Pyrénées-Atlantiques department, and region of Nouvelle-Aquitaine, southwestern France.

It lies 40 km NW of Pau on the Southern railway to Bayonne. The town also encompasses the small village of Sainte-Suzanne, an independent commune until 1973; residents of the town are called either Orthéziens or Sainte-Suzannais.

== Geography ==
Orthez straddles the westward-flowing Gave de Pau, with most of the town proper having developed on the right bank. Several residential developments and an industrial park are located on the left bank, in addition to Sainte-Suzanne, an associated village entity within the town. A partially artificial lake called 'Lac de l'y grec' (usually just spelled 'Lac de l'Y' i.e. 'Y Lake') (43°29′52″N 0°46′9″W) has a pleasant, scenic walking trail. Orthez station has rail connections to Tarbes, Pau, Bordeaux and Bayonne.

== History ==
During the 12th century, Orthez was the capital of Béarn, after Morlaàs and before Pau, which is still the prefectural administrative capital. At the end of the 12th century, Orthez passed from the possession of the viscounts of Dax to that of the viscounts of Bearn, whose chief place of residence it became in the 13th century. Froissart records the splendour of the court of Orthez under Gaston Phoebus in the latter half of the 14th century.

Jeanne d'Albret founded a Calvinist university in the town and Theodore Beza taught there for some time. An envoy sent in 1569 by Charles IX to revive the Catholic faith had to stand a siege in the battle of Orthez; the city was eventually taken by assault by the Protestant/Huguenot captain, Gabriel, count of Montgomery. In 1684 Nicholas Foucault, intendant under Louis XIV, was more successful, as the inhabitants, ostensibly at least, renounced Protestantism. It is nevertheless still a strong tradition in the town.

Another battle of Orthez occurred during the Napoleonic Wars on 27 February 1814, in which the British Duke of Wellington defeated Marshal Soult on the hills to the north of Orthez. Gaston Planté, the French physicist, was born here on the 22 April 1834; his major claim to fame was the invention in 1859 of the lead-acid battery, the common car battery.

== Population ==
The population data in the table below refer to the commune of Orthez proper, in its geography at the given years.

Historical population

| Year | Pop. | ±% p.a. |
|---|---|---|
| 1793 | 3,679 | — |
| 1821 | 6,802 | +2.22% |
| 1846 | 7,184 | +0.22% |
| 1872 | 6,526 | −0.37% |
| 1901 | 6,365 | −0.09% |
| 1926 | 5,952 | −0.27% |
| 1946 | 6,450 | +0.40% |
| 1962 | 8,413 | +1.67% |
| 1968 | 10,002 | +2.93% |

| Year | Pop. | ±% p.a. |
|---|---|---|
| 1975 | 10,855 | +1.18% |
| 1982 | 10,922 | +0.09% |
| 1990 | 10,159 | −0.90% |
| 1999 | 10,121 | −0.04% |
| 2007 | 10,338 | +0.27% |
| 2012 | 10,859 | +0.99% |
| 2017 | 10,449 | −0.77% |
| 2023 | 10,881 | +0.68% |

Source: EHESS and INSEE (1968-2023)

== Sights ==
The Gave de Pau is crossed in Orthez by a 14th-century bridge, which has four arches and is surmounted at its centre by a tower. Several old houses, and a church of the 12th, 14th and 15th centuries are of some interest. The most notable building is the Tour Moncade (43°29′31″N 0°46′13″W), a pentagonal tower of the 13th century, once the keep of a castle of the viscounts of Béarn, and now used as a meteorological observatory. A building of the 17th century is all that remains of the old Calvinist university (see below). The town hall is a newer building containing the library.

== Economy ==
Early in the 20th century, the spinning and weaving of hemp and flax, especially of the fabric called toile de Béarn, flour-milling, the manufacture of paper and of leather, and the preparation of hams known as jambons de Bayonne and other delicacies, were among its industries. There are quarries of stone and marble in the area, and the town had a thriving trade in leather, hams, and lime.

== Administration ==
Orthez has a judicial court but not an appeals court. It was the seat of a subprefecture from 1800 until 1926 (the dates of the creation and abolition of the arrondissement (district) of Orthez).

== Sports ==
Orthez is known in sport for basketball with Élan Béarnais Pau-Orthez team, which is one of the most successful French basketball clubs. Orthez is the smallest town of the continent to have won a Euro Cup (Korać Cup in 1984) in all sports. Élan Béarnais Pau-Orthez moved to Pau in 1991.

Moments before the start of the 16th stage of the Tour de France from Pont-Neuf; signaled by the mayor.

Orthez was the site for the start of Stage 16 in the 2007 Tour de France.

The main sports clubs of the city are:

Rugby :

- US Orthez (playing in Fédérale 1 championship)

Soccer :

- Elan Béarnais Orthez

Basketball :

- US Orthez
- Élan Béarnais Orthez (from 1908 to 1991)

== Notable natives and residents ==
- Gaston III Febus (1331–1391), viscount of Bearn
- Jeanne d'Albret (1528–1572), Queen of Navarre and mother of French King Henry IV
- Pierre-Adolphe Lafargue (1818-1869), newspaper publisher and educator in Marksville, Louisiana, born in Orthez
- Gaston Planté (1834–1889), inventor of lead-acid battery in 1859
- Francis Planté (1839–1934), French pianist famed as one of the first recording artists.
- Marguerite Zéline Trigant (1805-1887) founded a school at Orthez
- Armand Reclus (1843–1927), theorized the Panama Canal
- Onésime Reclus (1837-1916), born here, geographer
- Francis Jammes (1868–1938), poet
- Jean-Louis Curtis (1917–1995), novelist
- Daniel d'Auger de Subercase (1661-1732), soldier
- Alain Ducasse (b.1956), chef.
- Joël Suhubiette (b.1962), choral conductor

== Twin towns – sister cities ==
| Town | State/Region | Country |
|---|---|---|
| Tarazona | Aragon | Spain |

== Climate ==
Climate data for Orthez (1994–2020 normals, extremes 1994–present)
| Month | Jan | Feb | Mar | Apr | May | Jun | Jul | Aug | Sep | Oct | Nov | Dec | Year |
|---|---|---|---|---|---|---|---|---|---|---|---|---|---|
| Record high °C (°F) | 24.8 (76.6) | 27.1 (80.8) | 30.4 (86.7) | 32.7 (90.9) | 35.9 (96.6) | 39.7 (103.5) | 39.4 (102.9) | 40.8 (105.4) | 39.7 (103.5) | 35.7 (96.3) | 28.8 (83.8) | 24.2 (75.6) | 40.8 (105.4) |
| Mean daily maximum °C (°F) | 11.6 (52.9) | 12.8 (55.0) | 16.1 (61.0) | 18.5 (65.3) | 21.6 (70.9) | 25.0 (77.0) | 26.7 (80.1) | 27.2 (81.0) | 24.9 (76.8) | 21.0 (69.8) | 14.7 (58.5) | 12.2 (54.0) | 19.4 (66.9) |
| Daily mean °C (°F) | 7.2 (45.0) | 7.8 (46.0) | 10.6 (51.1) | 13.0 (55.4) | 16.3 (61.3) | 19.6 (67.3) | 21.2 (70.2) | 21.4 (70.5) | 18.8 (65.8) | 15.4 (59.7) | 10.2 (50.4) | 7.7 (45.9) | 14.1 (57.4) |
| Mean daily minimum °C (°F) | 2.8 (37.0) | 2.9 (37.2) | 5.1 (41.2) | 7.5 (45.5) | 10.9 (51.6) | 14.2 (57.6) | 15.7 (60.3) | 15.5 (59.9) | 12.7 (54.9) | 9.9 (49.8) | 5.6 (42.1) | 3.2 (37.8) | 8.8 (47.8) |
| Record low °C (°F) | −7.6 (18.3) | −10.7 (12.7) | −8.2 (17.2) | −3.4 (25.9) | 0.3 (32.5) | 6.5 (43.7) | 7.5 (45.5) | 7.1 (44.8) | 4.7 (40.5) | −2.2 (28.0) | −6.8 (19.8) | −9.3 (15.3) | −10.7 (12.7) |
| Average precipitation mm (inches) | 126.2 (4.97) | 103.8 (4.09) | 99.3 (3.91) | 105.4 (4.15) | 106.6 (4.20) | 80.2 (3.16) | 67.0 (2.64) | 61.9 (2.44) | 90.5 (3.56) | 102.7 (4.04) | 149.3 (5.88) | 118.6 (4.67) | 1,211.5 (47.70) |
| Average precipitation days (≥ 1.0 mm) | 13.3 | 11.8 | 11.6 | 13.0 | 12.2 | 8.9 | 8.5 | 8.1 | 9.1 | 10.9 | 13.4 | 12.3 | 133.0 |
Source: Meteociel

== See also ==
- Communes of the Pyrénées-Atlantiques department
