= Jeanne Burbank =

American electrochemist

- Born: May 8, 1915; Philadelphia, Pennsylvania
- Died: March 2, 2002 (aged 86); Phoenix, Arizona
- Education: American University, University of Pennsylvania
- Spouse: Robert Clowe Burbank
- Scientific career
- Fields: Electrochemistry

Jeanne Beadle Burbank (May 8, 1915 – March 2, 2002) worked for 25 years at the United States Naval Research Laboratory (NRL), studying the materials and components of lead-acid and silver-zinc batteries used in submarines. She was acknowledged internationally as an expert in the field of electrochemistry.

== Early life and career ==
Jeanne Beadle was born in Philadelphia, Pennsylvania, on May 8, 1915, to John Bookwalter Beadle and Isabelle (Peacock) Beadle. She had a younger brother, John Beadle, Jr., and a sister, Joan Beadle (later Gailar). Much of Jeanne's childhood was spent in Washington, D.C. Prior to entering high school, Jeanne was home-schooled by her father, John Bookwalter Beadle. He was a civil engineer with degrees in mining and metallurgy. He worked with the United States Bureau of Reclamation and later with Brock & Weymouth, an aerial photography company.

Jeanne received a B.A. in chemistry from American University in Washington, D.C. She married Robert Clowe Burbank, also a chemist, on July 1, 1936. They worked at Peacock Laboratories in Philadelphia and studied colloidal chemistry at the University of Pennsylvania, from which Jeanne received her M.S. degree. Their daughter, Carey Lea Burbank, was born in 1942. After Robert's early death on September 21, 1946 of Hodgkin's lymphoma, Jeanne and her daughter returned to Washington, D.C., where she was hired as a research chemist by Joseph Clark White at the United States Naval Research Laboratory (NRL).

== Research ==
White's group was working to improve living conditions on submarines. Jeanne Burbank's main focus was research on acid storage batteries and storage cells, with special application to their use in submarines. Emissions from batteries, which required frequent maintenance, were an important concern on submarines. Possible dangers included the explosion of accumulated hydrogen gas, formation of poisonous chlorine gas if salt water contaminated the battery, and corrosion of the submarine's hull if an electrolyte leak went undetected. During her 25-year career at the Naval Research Laboratory, Burbank published 35 articles, obtained several patents, and was acknowledged internationally as an expert in the field of electrochemistry. When the first nuclear submarine, the USS Nautilus (SSN-571), was developed, Burbank was able to view the actual working conditions in which her batteries would be installed and used, and set up her own laboratory at the NRL with similar conditions for development and testing of her designs.

Her 1949 report, Phosphate Coatings on Steel, was followed by "ground-breaking work" with John Lander on Positive-Grid Corrosion in the Lead-Acid Cell, and with Albert C. Simon on Subgrain structure in lead and lead-antimony alloys in 1952. She received her first patent in 1958: US 2821565, with Lander and Simon, for a more resistant battery grid and plate using an alloy of tin, antimony and lead, "to improve the construction and increase the operating life of the acid-lead storage battery with a principal object being the provision of an improved grid and positive plates therefor which have greater resistance to corrosion and growth." She worked on portable batteries with Charles P. Wales, and was a leader in the study of polymorphs of lead dioxide and their implications for battery design and processing of battery materials. She also developed a special electroplating cell for dynamic x-ray diffraction studies. This was used to study the properties of electrodes made of materials such as lead and silver-zinc. In 1969, she was commended when awarded the William Blum award: "Your methods of applying X-ray and electron microscopy to the materials and components of lead-acid and silver-zinc batteries have made a substantial contribution to the understanding of battery grid corrosion and active materials reactions."

== Awards ==
- 1966, Battery Division Research Award, NRL, with Charles P. Wales
- 1969, William Blum Award, National Capital Section of the Electrochemical Society
- 1970, inaugural Frank Booth Award for outstanding technical merit

== Later life ==
In 1971, Jeanne retired. She settled in Tucson, Arizona, where she enjoyed interests in archaeology and Native American history and culture. An oil painter, she frequently chose the Sonoran Desert and Native Americans as subjects of her paintings. In 1986 she moved to Scottsdale, Arizona, with her sister, Joan Beadle Gailar. In 1997, after the death of her sister, Jeanne moved to Phoenix, Arizona. She died in Phoenix on March 2, 2002.
