= Louis Thiry =

French concert organist, composer, and pedagogue (1935–2019)

- Born: 15 February 1935; Fléville-devant-Nancy, Meurthe-et-Moselle, France
- Died: 27 June 2019 (aged 84); Mont-Saint-Aignan, Normandy, France
- Education: Institut National des Jeunes Aveugles; Nancy Conservatoire; Paris Conservatoire
- Occupations: Concert organist; Composer; Academic teacher
- Organizations: Rouen Conservatoire

Louis Henry Nicolas Thiry (15 February 1935 – 27 June 2019) was a French concert organist, composer and pedagogue. He was professor of organ at the Regional Conservatoire in Rouen and played in concerts internationally. His many recordings include the complete organ works of Olivier Messiaen in 1972, which received several awards and led the composer to describe him as "an extraordinary organist". Thiry was blind.

== Biography ==
Born in Fléville-devant-Nancy, Thiry, who was blind, studied music first at the Nancy Conservatoire, where he received a first prize in organ (organ class of Jeanne Demessieux) in 1952, followed by studies with André Marchal at Institut National des Jeunes Aveugles in Paris. From 1956, he studied at the Paris Conservatoire with Rolande Falcinelli, graduating in 1958 with a first prize in organ playing and improvisation.

He was titular organist of the 1732 Lefebvre organ at the chapel of the Charles Nicole Hospital, part of the University Hospital in Rouen. He was professor of organ in Metz where one of his students was Bernard-Marie Koltès, and held the same position at the Rouen Conservatoire where his students included Alain Mabit, Céline Frisch and Benjamin Alard.

He took part in many international festivals, including Lille, the Besançon Festival, the Festival of Paris, Haarlem, Venice and the 1982 Messiaen Festival in Moscow.

Thiry died on 27 June 2019 in Mont-Saint-Aignan.

== Recordings ==
Thiry recorded the complete organ works of Olivier Messiaen in 1972 at St. Pierre Cathedral in Geneva for Calliope. The composer Olivier Messiaen wrote about him:

Louis Thiry is an extraordinary organist. An accomplished virtuoso, an all-round musician, with unequalled memory and skill: he may be classed among the heroes of music (he has given several fine performances of my most difficult organ works -in particular my Messe de la Pentecôte). All those who have heard and all those who will hear Louis Thiry can but admire him.

The recording was awarded the Prize of the Président of the Republic, the Shock of Le Monde de la musique and the Grand Prix du Disque of l'Académie Charles Cros). It was reissued in 2018. In Thiry's obituary in Le Monde, Marie-Aude Roux described the recording as "still considered one of the great achievements in the history of records" ("toujours considéré comme l'une des grandes réalisations de l'histoire du disque").

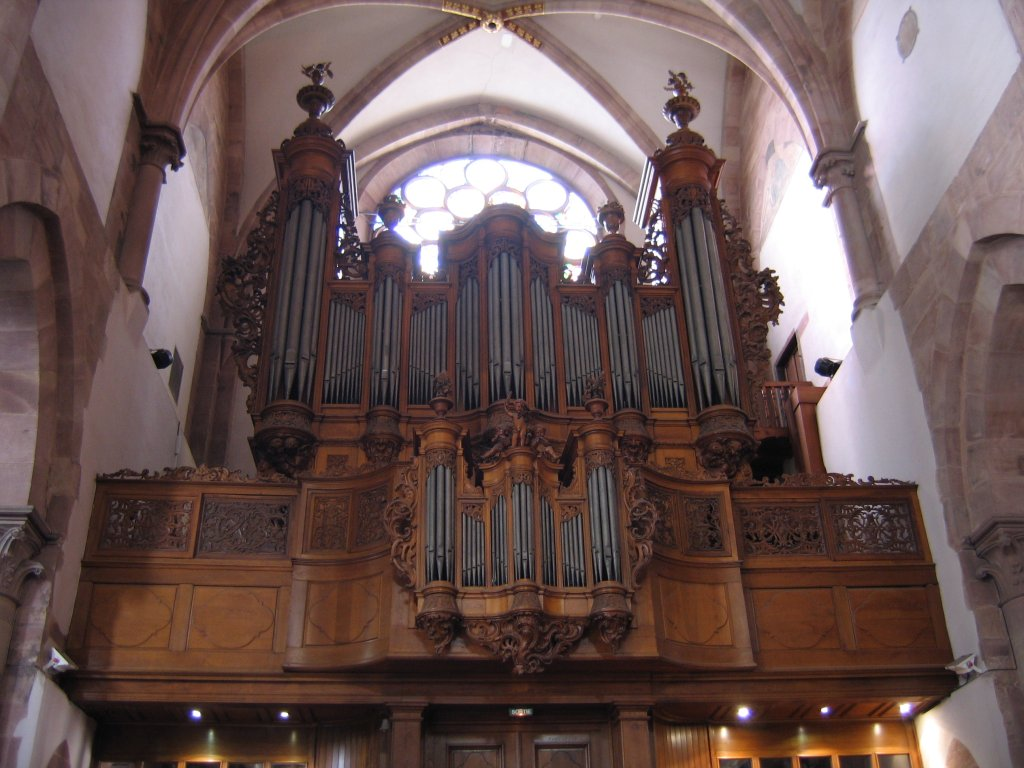
Silbermann organ of Église Saint-Thomas in Strasbourg

Thiry also recorded works by Bach, the Well Tempered Clavier at the Église Réformée d’Auteuil in 1975, and in 1993 The Art of Fugue at the organ of the Église Saint-Thomas in Strasbourg, built by Johann Andreas Silbermann in 1741. In 2004, he recorded arrangements for organ of medieval and Renaissance music by Guillaume de Machaut, Guillaume Dufay and Josquin Des Pres on the Lefebvre organ in Rouen. A reviewer noted that it was successful due to "the quality of the instrument on one hand, and Thiry's intelligent use of it."
