= Jean-Baptiste Robin =

French composer and organist

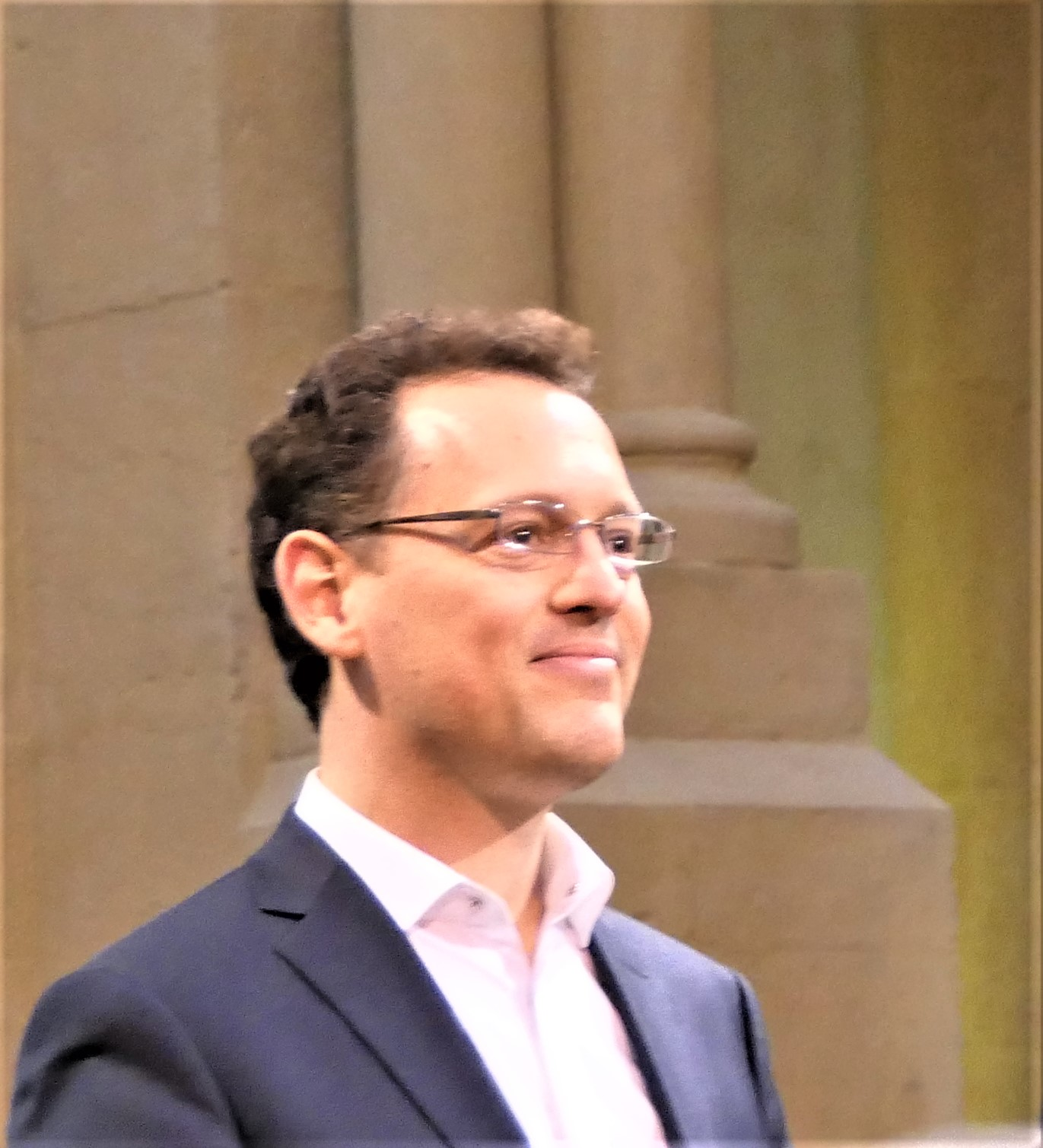
Jean-Baptiste Robin

Jean-Baptiste Robin (born 5 October 1976) is a French composer and organist.

== Biography ==
Robin studied composition and organ (with Michel Bouvard and Olivier Latry) at the Conservatoire de Paris, receiving five first prizes. He continued composition studies with George Benjamin (King's College London) and organ studies with Louis Robilliard (Conservatoire de Lyon, Prix de Perfectionnement), Odile Bailleux (Conservatoire de Bourg-la-Reine, Prix de Perfectionnement), and Marie-Claire Alain (regional conservatory of Paris). He was named organist at the Poitiers Cathedral in 2000 and "local" organist for the Chapel of Versailles. He currently teaches organ and composition at the conservatoire in Versailles.

Robin is particularly known for performances of French Baroque organ music, such as his recordings of the complete organ works of Louis Marchand and François Couperin, and also for his interpretations of the works of Jehan Alain and of Felix Mendelssohn . He has also recorded a recital on the EM Skinner Organ at Cincinnati Museum Center at Union Terminal and he is considered as one of the best performer for American Symphonic Organs. Robin was distinguished artist in residence in Yale University and guest professor in Haarlem International Festival.

Robin has had compositions commissioned by Pierre Boulez and the Ensemble InterContemporain, the Orchestre National de Lyon, the Philharmonia Orchestra, and Radio France among many others. In 2010, Naxos Records released a CD of Robin playing his own organ works.

== Compositions ==
=== Orchestra ===
Mechanic Fantasy, organ, string orchestra and timpani (2013) (published by Gérard Billaudot), 10 min. Commissioned by the Orchestre Régional de Basse Normandie

Chant de l'âme, string orchestra and C trumpet (2014) (published by Gérard Billaudot), 6'30 min.

Crop Circles, orchestra (2012) (published by Gérard Billaudot), 10 min. Commissioned by Radio France for the Orchestre National de France

Distances, chamber orchestra (2010) (published by Gérard Billaudot), 11 min. Commissioned by the Ensemble InterContemporain

Paysages parallèles, orchestra (2004), 10'30 min.

Toccata, orchestra (2002). Commissioned by the Orchestre National de Lyon for "les journée de la composition."

=== Organ ===
La Destruction du temps, organ (2020), 9'30 min (published by Gérard Billaudot), Commissioned by Radio France Concert Hall.

Le Chant du Ténéré, organ (2019), 6'30 min (published by Gérard Billaudot), Commissioned by Sylvanès Abbey.

The Hands of Time, organ (2018), 11 min (published by Gérard Billaudot), Commissioned by the American Guild of Organists.

Regard vers Agartha, 4 hands organ (2014), 6'30 min (Published by Le Chant du Monde), Commissioned by Orgelsommer in Saint-Leodegar in Lucerne.

Cinq versets sur le Veni Creator, organ (2012), (published by Gérard Billaudot) 17 min. Commissioned by Société de la cathédrale de Reims and les Amis de la basilique Saint-Rémi'

Récits héroïques, trumpet and organ (2012), 12'30 min (published by Gérard Billaudot), Commissioned by Urrugne Association of Organ.

Trois Solos, baroque organ (2011) (published by Gérard Billaudot), 11 min. Commissioned by the Association François-Henri Clicquot

Cercles réfléchissants, organ (2007–2008), (published by Gérard Billaudot), 31'30 min. Commissioned by the University of Kansas, the Fondation Marcelle et Robert de Lacour, and les amis de l'orgue de Nontron

Trois éléments d'un songe, organ (2004) (published by Gérard Billaudot), 10'30 min.

Regard vers l'Aïr, organ (2001) (published by Gérard Billaudot), 10'30 min.

=== Other ===
Messe solennelle pour la cathédrale de Westminster, for choir and organ (or two organs) (2026), 21'30 min. (Editions Billaudot) - Commissioned by Westminster Cathedral Choir, London

Sur un sommet (On the Top), for wind trio (2016), 13 min. (published by Gérard Billaudot)

Citadelle (Citadel), for piano and cello (2015), 7'30 min. (published by Gérard Billaudot)

Chant de l'âme, for piano and C Trumpet (2015), 6'30 min. (published by Gérard Billaudot)

Tick-Tock, for piano and violin (2015), 4 min.

Trois nuits, for 2 cellos (2013), 12 min. (published by Gérard Billaudot)

Récits Héroïques (Heroic Tales), for trumpet and organ (2013), 12'30 min. (published by Gérard Billaudot)

L'enfant, le cercle et le vent, piano solo (2008), 5 min.

Labyrinthe circulaire, for 8 clarinets (2007), 9 min.

Impulsion, two pianos and percussion (2006), 10 min.

Souffle de l'ombre, two pianos and percussion (2005), 7 min.

Reflected Faces, flute, clarinet, harp, and string quartet (2005)

Emergences, children's choir and organ (2005), 27 min. Commissioned by Radio France for la Maîtrise de RF.

Falaises miroir de lune, piano solo (2003) (published by Gérard Billaudot), 7 min.

Poèmes de l'aube et de la nuit, mezzo-soprano and piano (2001), 6'30 min.

Hommage à Rilke, ensemble and soprano (2000)

Etoile intérieure, piano and organ (1999)
