= Jacob Regnart =

Franco-Flemish Renaissance composer

Jacob Regnart (French: Jacques Regnart; 1540s – 16 October 1599) was a Flemish Renaissance composer. He spent most of his career in Austria and Bohemia, where he wrote both sacred and secular music.

== Biography ==
Regnart was born at Douai, one of five brothers. His first documented appearance is in 1560 as a tenor at the Hofkapelle in Prague under Habsburg ruler Archduke Maximilian; Regnart claimed to have worked there since 1557. In 1564 his first works were published; he moved to Vienna and then Italy, where he studied from 1568 to 1570. The first fruits of these studies, Il primo libro delle canzone italiane, would be published in 1574, with many subsequent volumes to follow.

In November 1570 he became an instructor for Maximilian's chapel choir, and upon Maximilian's death, Emperor Rudolf II hired him as a member of his Hofkapelle. It was in the 1570s that his volumes of three-voice Teutsche Lieder (German songs) appeared, printed by the Gerlachs of Nuremberg; they sold very well, were reprinted several times, and were arranged in tablature by several composers. In October 1579, he became vice-Kapellmeister, succeeding Alard du Gaucquier; the next year, Orlandus Lassus gave his name as a replacement for Antonio Scandello's position as Kapellmeister in Saxony, but Regnart did not accept the position, preferring to remain employed under the Habsburgs. However, in 1582, Archduke Ferdinand asked him to replace Alexander Utendal as vice-Kapellmeister, and he accepted, moving to Innsbruck in April 1582. In 1584, Regnart produced music for a comedy written by the Archduke, though this is now lost. On New Year's Day 1585, Regnart became Kapellmeister, and revamped the court's musical activities to great success, hiring many new Dutch and Italian singers and becoming quite wealthy himself.

In 1588, Regnart published a collection of motets which displayed his support for Catholic reform. In 1590, Regnart and three of his four brothers, all of whom were accomplished musicians, published a joint collection of motets. Ferdinand had planned to make him a noble for his efforts, but died before he could do so; Archduke Matthias, his successor, completed the process in 1596. When Ferdinand died, his Hofkapelle was dissolved, and Regnart moved from Innsbruck back to Prague in 1596, where he became vice-Kapellmeister under Monte until his death in 1599.

Regnart's works were regularly anthologized well into the 17th century, and his music was held in high regard by such theorists as Michael Praetorius and Jacob Burmeister. The first modern edition of his works was completed by Richard Eitner in 1895; a new edition was published by Corpus Mensurabilis Musicae in the 1970s.

== Works ==
Sacred vocal

- Sacrae aliquot cantiones, quas moteta vulgus appellat, 5/6 voices (Munich, 1575)
- Aliquot cantiones, vulgo motecta appellatae, ex veteri atque novo testamento collectae, 4 voices (Nuremberg, 1577)
- Mariale, hoc est, Opusculum sacrarum cantionum omnibus Beatissimae Virginis Mariae festivitatibus, 4–8 voices (Innsbruck, 1588)
- Novae cantiones sacrae, quator, quinque et sex vocum, Franciscus Regnart, Jacobus Regnart, Pascasius Regnart, Carolus Regnart, published by Augustinus Regnart (canon at Lille), 1590
- Missae sacrae ad imitationem selectissimarum cantionum suavissima harmonia, 5–8 voices (Frankfurt, 1602)
- Continuatio missarum sacrarum, ad imitationem selectissimarum cantionum suavissima harmonia, 4–10 voices (Frankfurt, 1603)
- Corollarium missarum sacrarum ad imitationem selectissimarum cantionum suavissima harmonia compositarum (Frankfurt, 1603)
- Sacrarum cantionum, 4–8, 12 voices (Frankfurt, 1605)
- Canticum Mariae, 5 voices (Dillingen, 1605); lost
- Missarum flores illustrium numquam hactenus visi (Frankfurt, 1611); lost
- Magnificat, ad octo modos musicos compositum cum duplici antiphona, Salve regina, 8 and 10 voices (Frankfurt, 1614); lost
- Numerous other motets, hymns, etc. published. Appearing in manuscript are ~20 masses, many motets, a St. Matthew Passion, ca. 100 hymns, and other miscellanea.

Secular vocal

- Il primo libro delle canzone italiane, 5 voices (Vienna, 1574; rpt. in a German edition)
- Kurtzweilige teutsche Lieder, nach Art der Neapolitanen oder welschen Villanellen, 3 voices (Nuremberg, 1574, 2nd ed. 1578)
- Der ander Theyl kurtzweiliger teutscher Lieder, 3 voices (Nuremberg, 1577)
- Der dritter Theyl schöner kurtzweiliger teutscher Lieder, 3 voices (Nuremberg, 1579)
- Newe kurtzweilige teutsche Lieder, 5 voices (Nuremberg, 1580)
- Il secundo libro delle canzone italiane, 5 voices (Nuremberg, 1581; rpt. in a German edition)
- Teutsche Lieder ... in ein Opus zusamendruckt, 3 voices (Munich, 1583)[complete edn of songs, 3vv]
- Tricinia: kurtzweilige teutsche Lieder, 3 voices (Nuremberg, 1584) [complete edn. of songs, 3vv]
- Kurtzweilige teutsche Lieder, 4 voices (Munich, 1591), survives incomplete
- Schoene Comedie: Speculum vitae humanae, auff teutsch ein Spiegel des menschlichen Lebens genandt (music to accompany a play by Archduke Ferdinand), 1584, lost
- 46 other German songs, 2 madrigals, 2 Latin odes, etc.

Instrumental

- 29 intabulations

== Recordings ==
- Regnart: Missa super "Oeniades Nymphae" Cinquecento; Hyperion CDA67640
- Regnart: Mariale 1588, Marian Motets for the Innsbruck Court. Weser-Renaissance Bremen, dir. Manfred Cordes CPO 999 507-2 1996

== Sources ==
- Pass, Walter. Regnart, Jacob. The New Grove Dictionary of Music and Musicians.
- Pratt, Waldo Selden (1907). The History of Music. New York: G. Schirmer, Inc. p. 133.
