= Victor Regnart =

Belgian painter (1886–1964)

Victor Regnart (1886–1964) was a Belgian painter.
