= Gaston Planté =

French physicist (1834–1889)

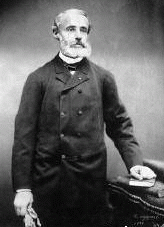
- Gaston Planté
- Born: 22 April 1834; Orthez, Kingdom of France
- Died: 21 May 1889 (aged 55); Meudon, French Third Republic
- Known for: lead–acid battery
- Scientific career
- Fields: physics

Gaston Planté (French pronunciation: [ʁɛmɔ̃ lwi ɡastɔ̃ plɑ̃te]; 22 April 1834 – 21 May 1889) was a French physicist who invented the lead–acid battery in 1859. This type of battery was developed as the first rechargeable electric battery marketed for commercial use and it is widely used in automobiles.

Planté was born on 22 April 1834 in Orthez, France. In 1854 he began work as an assistant lecturer in physics at the Conservatory of Arts and Crafts in Paris. In 1860 he was promoted to the post of Professor of Physics at the Polytechnic Association for the Development of Popular Instruction. An amphitheatre at that institute is named after him.

In 1855, Planté discovered the first fossils of the prehistoric flightless bird Gastornis parisiensis (named after him) near Paris. This gigantic animal was a very close relative of the famous diatrymas of North America. At that time, Planté was at the start of his academic career, serving as a teaching assistant to A. E. Becquerel (father of Nobel laureate Henri Becquerel). This early discovery—although it created considerable excitement in 1855—was soon to be overshadowed by Planté's subsequent discoveries.

He was elected as a member to the American Philosophical Society in 1882.

== Lead-acid battery ==
In 1859, Planté invented the lead-acid cell, the first rechargeable battery. His early model consisted of a spiral roll of two sheets of pure lead, separated by a linen cloth and immersed in a glass jar of sulfuric acid solution. The following year, he presented a nine-cell lead-acid battery to the Academy of Sciences. In 1881, Camille Alphonse Faure would develop a more efficient and reliable model that saw great success in early electric cars.

Planté also investigated the differences between static electricity and dynamic electricity (i.e., from batteries). As part of this investigation, Planté invented a mechanical device that he called the Rheostatic Machine. The Rheostatic Machine used a bank of mica capacitors, a clever rotating commutator, and a series of contacts to alternately charge a bank of capacitors in parallel (from a high-voltage battery source) and then connect the capacitors in series. This arrangement multiplied the battery voltage by the number of capacitor stages to obtain very high voltages. By rapidly rotating the shaft, a series of high-voltage sparks many centimetres long could be rapidly generated. This device was a mechanical predecessor of the modern-day Marx generator. Using this device, Planté explored the electrical breakdown of air, the formation of Lichtenberg figures, and the behaviour of thin wires when pulsed by high electric currents.

== Death and legacy ==
He died on 21 May 1889 in the Bellevue part of Meudon, near Paris. In 1989 the Bulgarian Academy of Sciences established the Gaston Planté Medal, which is awarded every few years to scientists who have made significant contributions to the development of lead-acid battery technology.
