= Alexandros Markeas =

Franco-Greek composer

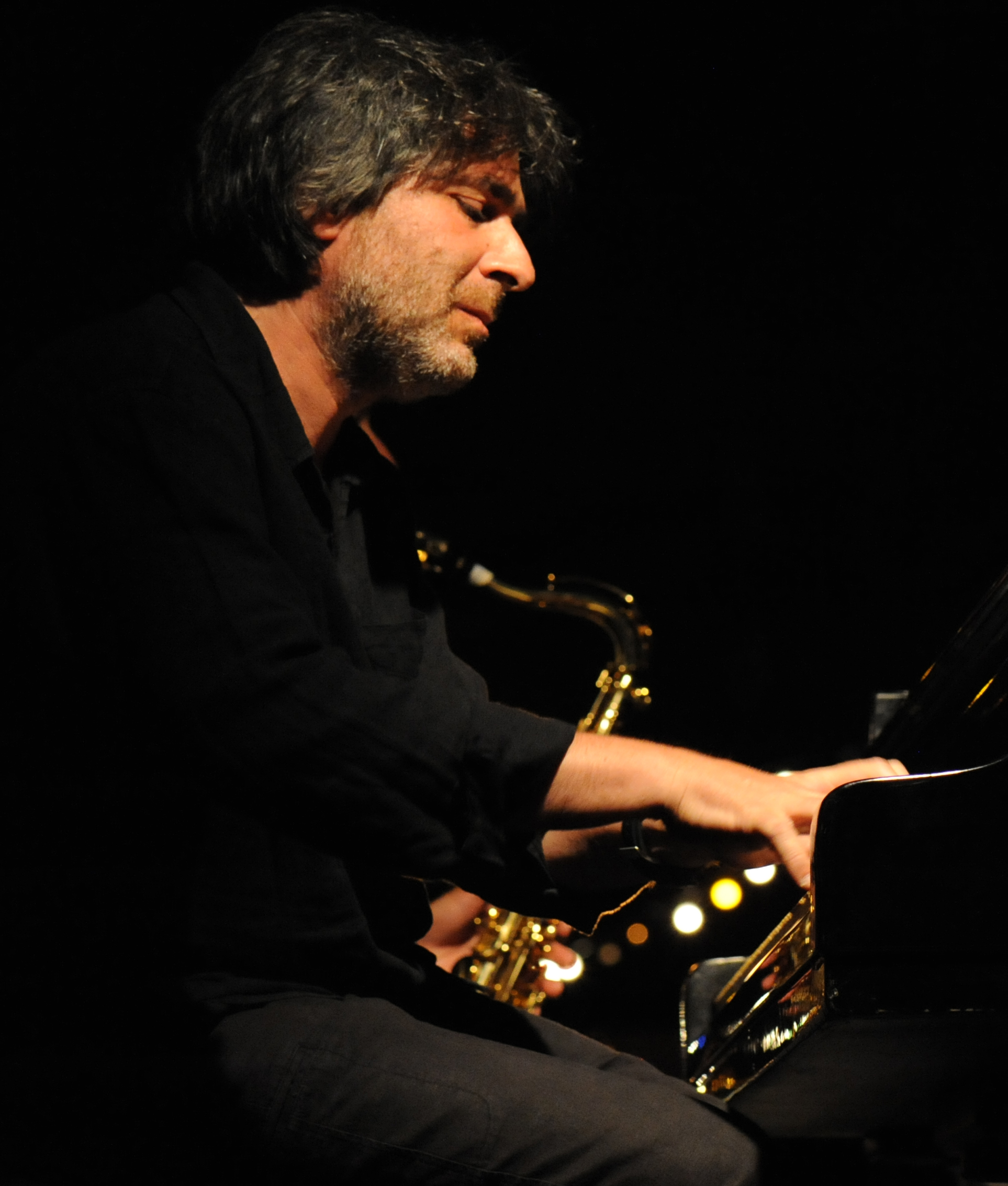
Alexandros Markeas at the 2013 festival Musique en Chemin, La Romieu

Alexandros Markeas (born 18 November 1965) is a Franco-Greek composer of instrumental contemporary music.

== Life ==
Born in Athens, Markeas studied at the National Conservatory of Greece. After a year of law studies in Athens he entered the Conservatoire de Paris (CNSMD) in the class of Gabriel Tacchino and then in that of Alain Planès. In 1990 he was unanimously awarded a First Prize for piano and a year later a First Prize in chamber music, also unanimously awarded by the jury. At the same time, he got interested in music writing and musical composition. He completed his training at the CNSMD with first prizes in counterpoint (1992), fugue (1994) and finally composition (1996), a discipline for which he was admitted to the advanced training cycle.

In addition, he was selected to follow the composition and computer music curriculum of the IRCAM.

In 1998, he participated in the first European Academy of Music of the Aix-en-Provence Festival where he wrote the music for a ballet.

In 2000–2001 he was a resident of the Villa Medici.

Markeas is part of the heritage of the Parisian spectral school, that of a "processual" music, a music more attached to sound than to the note, gradually moving from one state of the material to another; a music involving a dialectic between harmonic and inharmonic, between periodicity and aperiodicity. To this compositional approach, Alexandros Markeas adds a theatrical dimension, allowing him to escape from "pure music". His compositions are marked by the use of multimedia techniques.

At some time he was a professor of generative improvisation at the Conservatoire de Paris (CNSMD).

== Awards ==
- Prix Hervé Dugardin de la SACEM, 2001
- Prix du syndicat des critiques, 2005
- Prix Nouveau talent musique of the Société des auteurs et compositeurs dramatiques (SACD), 2009
- Prix Musique of the Société des auteurs et compositeurs dramatiques (SACD), 2020
- Grand Prix Sacem de la musique classique contemporaine, 2023
