= Jacques Moderne =

Italian-born music publisher

Jacques Moderne - Giacomo Moderno (Pinguente, Istria [now Buzet, Croatia], c.1495–1500 – Lyons, after 1560) was an Italian-born music publisher active in France in the Renaissance Era.

Moderne was the second printer to publish music on a large scale in France using the single-impression method. The first one was Pierre Attaingnant (c. 1494–1551/2) of Paris, who began issuing his music books in 1527/8.

Although Moderne is nowadays known as a music publisher, which was a major part of his production and the part that brought him the greatest renown, he printed about one hundred books of several themes, such as religion, home remedies, palmistry, among others.
