= Zad Moultaka =

- Born: 1967 (age 58–59)
- Occupations: Pianist, composer
- Instrument: Piano

Born into the world of contemporary theatre in Lebanon in 1967, Zad Moultaka is a composer and visual artist. He started playing the piano at the age of five and moved to Paris in 1984. In 1989, he won First Prize at the Conservatoire National Superieur de Paris. In 1993, he abandoned his international career as an interpreter to devote himself to composition and the visual arts. Trained in the discipline of western musical writing but organically linked to his Mediterranean roots, Zad Moultaka created his own musical language. He was noticed by György Kurtág, and his meeting with the composer was decisive in his formulation of a progressive, original and atypical writing. His works are interpreted and appreciated throughout the world; he received the SACEM Claude Arrieu prize in 2007 and the Critics' Prize, best musical creation in 2017, for his work UM, the sovereign driving force of all things.

His many musical collaborations include the 58th Venice Art Biennale, Van Harentz Foundation; Sveriges Radios Symfoniorkester, Stockholm; Deutsche Oper Berlin; Muziktheater Im Revier, Gelsenkirchen; Neue Vocal Solisten, Stuttgart; Choir The elements; ArsNova set; Ensemble Musicatreize, 2e2m… and more recently, Hémon, Opéra national du Rhin, Strasbourg; Der letzte Klang ist der erste Blick, Ensemble Modern, Frankfurt; Requiem for a New World, Basilica S.S. Giovanni e Paolo, Venice and L’Orangeraie, Compagnie Lyrique de Création Chants Libres, Montreal.

In parallel, he continues his visual arts practice working across installation, painting, photography and video. Recent exhibitions highlights include Totah Gallery New York; Dome Oscar Niemeyer Tripoli-Lebanon; Center Pompidou-Metz; 57th Venice Art Biennale, Sursock Museum, Beirut 2018, Suomennlina, Finland; Nuit Blanche, Paris; Saint-Pierre-aux-Nonnins, Arsenal de Metz and Art Dubai and Palazzo Albrizzi, Venice.

More recently, Moultaka was selected from among 200 Visionaries by Maison Louis Vuitton, in order to create a trunk to mark the 200th birthday of its founder. In November, he will exhibit his new collection “APOCALYPSE 6:08,” at AEDAEN gallery, Strasbourg-France and a visual and sound installation “WAHM” Corridor des Illusions in China.

In March 2025, “Zad Moultaka: Startes et palimpsestes” by Jean-Yves Bosseur was published by Editions Delatour France in their “Collection musique/transversales”. In this book, Bosseur delves into the world of Moultaka and finds many interesting particularity in the multitude of crossroads between the East, the West, the past archetypes and the current world of Moultaka.

== Discography ==
- Hachô dyôldat Alôhô - La Passion selon Marie (passion in Syriac)

As composer-performer;

- Anashid (2001)
- Zarani, with soprano Fadia Tomb el-Hage (2003)
- Zarani Mouwashahs avec Piano (2004)
- Visions with soprano Fadia Tomb el-Hage (2009)
- Où en est la nuit 2014

As pianist

- Mirages, Chimères... Musique de Gabriel Fauré, Philippe Balloy baritone with Zad Moultaka piano

== Exhibitions ==
=== Solo exhibitions ===
- ŠamaŠ (Sun Dark Sun), Pavilion of Lebanon at the Venice Biennale, 2017

=== Group exhibitions ===
- Cycles Of Collapsing Progress, curated by Karina El Helou and Anissa Touati, Rashid Karami International Fair, Tripoli, Lebanon
