= Guillaume Boni =

French composer

Guillaume Boni (c. 1530 – c. 1594) was a French Renaissance composer. Boni was choirmaster at Saint-Étienne Cathedral from 1565 until his death in 1598. Like Anthoine de Bertrand, he was born in Auvergne and worked in Toulouse.

== Works ==
- Psalmi Davidici novis concentibus sex vocibus modulati cum oratione Regia 12. voc Paris: Le Roy
- Chansons de Ronsard

His works were known in England: a work of Boni's is the only identifiable foreign work found in the Willmott and Braikenridge 1591 manuscripts of Latin church music.
