= Calliope (record label) =

French record label

Calliope is a French classical record label originally based in Compiègne. It was founded in 1972 by Jacques Le Calvé, a record shop owner, upon the encouragement of Erato Records producer Michel Garcin. The label was named after Calliope, the muse of epic poetry and mother of Orpheus, and not the calliope organ. Its artists included the organists André Isoir and Louis Thiry and Jean-Claude Casadesus with the Orchestre de Lille.

Le Calvé retired from the label in 2010. The rights to some of the Calliope catalogue were then acquired by Phaia Records with a dozen reissues made available.

In 2011 the label was bought by Indésens Records, an independent French label founded in 2006 by Benoit d'Hau and began to again issue both reissues and new recordings under the Calliope label. Jacques Le Calvé keeps being a close and active artistic consultant, and inspires the new productions.
