= Harmonia Mundi =

French independent record label

- Parent company: PIAS Entertainment Group
- Founded: 1958
- Founder: Bernard Coutaz
- Distributor: Virgin Music Group
- Genre: Classical, jazz, world
- Country of origin: France
- Location: Arles
- Official website: www.harmoniamundi.com

Harmonia Mundi is a record label that specializes in classical music, jazz, and world music (on the World Village label). It was founded in France in 1958 and is now a subsidiary of PIAS Entertainment Group, which is itself owned by Universal Music Group as of October 2024.

Its Latin name harmonia mundi translates as "harmony of the world".

== History ==
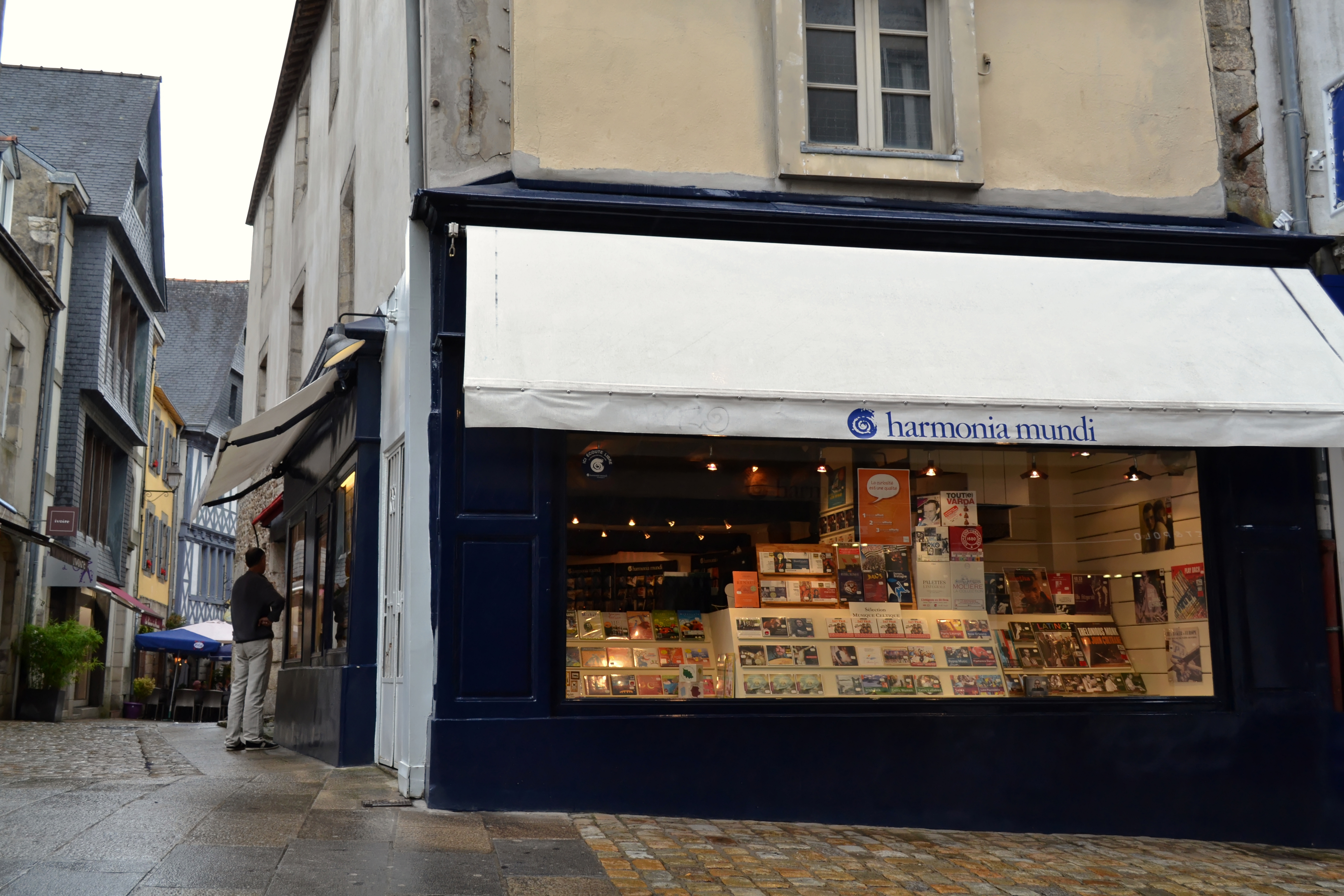
A Harmonia Mundi retail outlet in Quimper, France

In the 1950s, two music entrepreneurs, Frenchman Bernard Coutaz and German Rudolf Ruby, met by chance on a train journey and started a friendship based on their musical interests. They formed a business relationship and set up two classical music record labels, both named Harmonia Mundi. Coutaz's Harmonia Mundi (France) was founded in Saint-Michel-de-Provence, France, in 1958, and around the same time, Rudolf Ruby set up Deutsche Harmonia Mundi. The two labels shared similar aims and specialised in recordings of Early and Baroque music, with an emphasis on scholarly, historically informed performance and high-quality sound and production values. They also shared the Harmonia Mundi name for commercial reasons and collaborated for many years, sharing artists, material and distribution, and competing successfully with classical labels such as Éditions de l'Oiseau-Lyre's Decca Records and Deutsche Grammophon's Archiv Produktion.

The association between the two labels began to loosen after Deutsche Harmonia Mundi partnered with BASF and then with EMI. In 1989 Bertelsmann Music Group (BMG) took over the Deutsche Harmonia Mundi's distribution. Ruby retired in 1992 and Coutaz tried unsuccessfully to buy the German record label and Deutsche Harmonia Mundi was wholly acquired by BMG. BMG is part of Sony Classical Records. Coutaz's Harmonia Mundi continued as an independent label for many years.

In 1986 Harmonia Mundi (France) moved to Arles, France. Harmonia Mundi (US) is a branch of Harmonia Mundi (France). There are also operations in the United Kingdom and in Spain.

The label was acquired by PIAS Entertainment Group in September 2015.

In November 2022, Universal Music Group purchased 49% stake in [PIAS] (including Harmonia Mundi).

== Catalogue ==
Noted artists and ensembles who have recorded with Harmonia Mundi have included Maya Youssef, René Jacobs, Dominique Visse, William Christie, Alfred Deller, Andreas Scholl, Philippe Herreweghe, Maurice Steger, Alexander Melnikov, Isabelle Faust, Jean-Guihen Queyras, Kent Nagano, Samuel Hasselhorn, Raphaël Pichon, Amandine Beyer, Freiburger Barockorchester, les Siècles, Akademie für Alte Musik Berlin and Collegium Vocale.

Harmonia Mundi also issues recordings under a number of subsidiary labels such as Ambronay, Discograph, Le Chant du Monde and World Village.

== Awards ==
Harmonia Mundi has received several accolades for its specialist recordings, including Label of the Year 2003 in the Gramophone Classical Music Awards; Best Opera Recording for René Jacobs' recording of Mozart's Le nozze di Figaro at the 2005 Grammy Awards; and Label of the Year 2006 at the Midem Classical Awards.
