= Lost operas by Jean-Philippe Rameau =

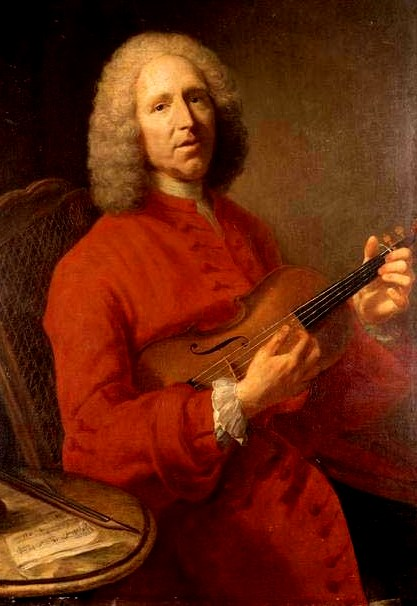
Jean-Philippe Rameau

The musical scores to several operas by the French composer Jean-Philippe Rameau have been lost. They include two major tragédies en musique, Samson and Linus, and a one-act pastoral opera Lisis et Délie. The music to these pieces was substantially complete and was performed in rehearsal but for various reasons - including censorship in the case of Samson - they were never publicly staged. Rameau also wrote a divertissement for Alexis Piron's play Les courses de Tempé, which did appear at the theatre in 1734. The music to all these works has been almost completely lost, although there is evidence Rameau reused some of it in his later operas. Rameau also began other operatic projects, which were either abandoned at an early stage (Pandore) or broken up to form shorter works (Les beaux jours de l'Amour).

== Samson ==
Samson was a tragédie en musique in five acts and a prologue with a libretto by Voltaire. The work was never staged due to censorship, although Voltaire later printed his text. Rameau intended the opera on the theme of Samson and Delilah as the successor to his debut Hippolyte et Aricie, which premiered in October 1733. Voltaire had become a great admirer of Rameau's music after seeing Hippolyte and suggested a collaboration with the composer in November 1733. The opera was complete by late summer 1734 and went into rehearsal. However, a work on a religious subject with a libretto by such a notorious critic of the Church was bound to run into controversy and Samson was banned. An attempt to revive the project in a new version in 1736 also failed. Rameau recycled some of the music from Samson in his later operas.

== Les courses de Tempé ==
Les courses de Tempé (The Race of Tempe) was a pastoral drama by Alexis Piron. Both Piron and Rameau came from Dijon and the two were close friends. Rameau had provided incidental music for a number of Piron's plays at the Paris fairs in the 1720s. Les courses de Tempé was their last collaboration. It premiered at the Comédie-Française on 30 August 1734 in a double bill with a comedy called L'amant mystérieux. Rameau wrote the music for the final divertissement, which had choreography by Antoine-François Dangeville. Only the vocal parts have survived.

== Linus ==
Linus was a tragédie en musique in five acts with a libretto by Charles-Antoine Leclerc de La Bruère. For reasons which remain unclear it was never staged and the music is almost completely lost. Only two manuscript copies of the libretto and two manuscript copies of the violin part survive. La Bruère completed most of the libretto by October 1749. He initially offered it to Mondonville before handing it to Rameau in April 1750. Rameau finished the score by November and Linus went into rehearsal at the house of the Marquise de Villeroy on 10 May 1751. The rehearsals revealed some problems with the words and music of the fifth act and revisions were needed before the opera could be staged. However, this never happened because the manuscript score was "lost or stolen" from the Marquise de Villeroy's house during confusion caused by an "illness" and only the part for the violin was left. The illness was probably Rameau's rather than Madame de Villeroy's as the composer is known to have been seriously indisposed in early 1751.

== Lisis et Délie ==
Lisis et Délie (or Lysis et Délie) was a one-act pastoral opera with a libretto by Jean-François Marmontel. Rameau's musical score is now lost. It was scheduled to appear at Fontainebleau on 6 November 1753 as part of the celebrations for the birth of the royal prince Xavier, Duke of Aquitaine. It was due to form a double bill with the comédie-ballet Les hommes (words by Germain-François Poullain de Saint-Foix, music by François-Joseph Giraud). However, it was withdrawn from performance and "La danse", the third entrée of Rameau's Les fêtes d'Hébé, was performed in its place. The reason given for the work's cancellation was that it was too similar to Rameau's Daphnis et Eglé, premiered at Fontainebleau on 30 October. The libretto was published but the music does not survive. Rameau may have reused some of it in his later operas.

== Other abandoned projects ==
=== Pandore ===
In a letter to Claude-Nicolas Thieriot on 23 April 1739 Voltaire claimed he was no longer interested in writing libretti: "As far as opera is concerned, after the still-birth of Samson, there is no indication that I might wish to write another. The labour pains of the first have scarred me too deeply." However, by the end of the year he was at work on new libretto for a tragédie en musique in five acts, Pandore, which fused the story of Adam and Eve and original sin with the Greek myths of Prometheus and Pandora. Voltaire sent a draught to Helvétius in January 1740. He extensively reworked the text following suggestions from friends and it was ready by the summer. Voltaire was initially reluctant to offer it to Rameau and considered Jean-Joseph de Mondonville as a potential composer instead. His hesitation may have been because - surprisingly, given the dramaturgy of Samson - Pandore contained extensive recitative. Nevertheless, Rameau accepted the libretto and was hard at work on the score by June, according to a letter from Voltaire. However, the project stalled and in February 1741 Voltaire was trying to persuade Madame Denis to take it on. The probable reason Rameau's enthusiasm waned was the lack of dramatic interest after the first act, but Voltaire blamed the interference of intermediaries. Voltaire again tried to interest Rameau in Pandore in 1745 but the two collaborated on the comédie-ballet La princesse de Navarre instead.

This was not the end of the libretto's career. In 1752 Joseph-Nicolas-Pancrace Royer set it to music and the opera was rehearsed privately. Voltaire was furious to learn that alterations had been made to his text. Royer's version was never staged and the music is now lost. In 1765 Voltaire granted Rameau's pupil Jean-Benjamin de La Borde permission to produce his own setting. In spite of Voltaire and La Borde's efforts this Pandore never made the stage either.

=== Les beaux jours de l'Amour ===
Les beaux jours de l'Amour was the title of a projected opéra-ballet. The name appears - crossed out - on the manuscript scores of two one-act Rameau operas, La naissance d'Osiris and Nélée et Myrthis, suggesting they were once part of a larger work. The Rameau specialist Sylvie Bouissou believes the librettist was Louis de Cahusac and Les beaux jours was substantially complete by May 1751. Rameau and Cahusac's Anacréon would also have been part of Les beaux jours and both this act and Nélée et Myrthis would have had the ancient Greek poet Anacreon as the hero (Anacreon's name is crossed out and replaced by that of Nélée in the manuscript of the latter piece). The reasons why the multi-act opéra-ballet was abandoned are unknown.

=== Les nymphes de Diane ===
Les nymphes de Diane (The Nymphs of Diana) may have been another planned multi-act opéra-ballet. The title appears on the manuscript score of Rameau's opera Zéphyre. It seems the composer abandoned the idea and kept Zéphyre as a one-act piece.

== Sources ==
- Bouissou, Sylvie Jean-Philippe Rameau: Musicien des lumières (Fayard, 2014)
- Girdlestone, Cuthbert, Jean-Philippe Rameau: His Life and Work, New York: Dover, 1969 (paperback edition)
- Dubruque, Julien, essay on "The Stormy Collaboration Between Voltaire and Rameau" in the book accompanying Guy Van Waas's recording of Le temple de la Gloire (Ricercar, 2015)
- Holden, Amanda, ed., The Viking Opera Guide, New York:Viking, 1993
- Sadler, Graham The Rameau Compendium (Boydell Press, 2014)
