= La naissance d'Osiris =

1754 one-act opera by Jean-Philippe Rameau

- Opera by Jean-Philippe Rameau
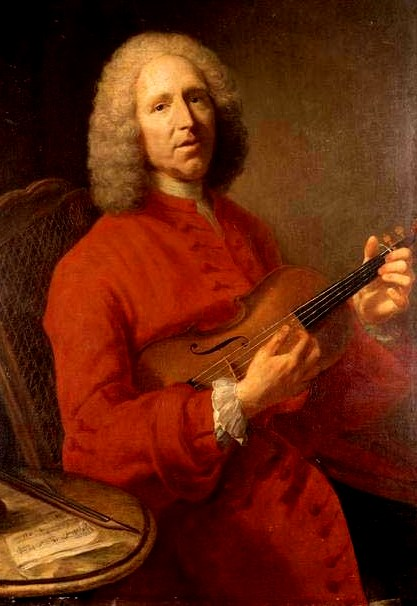
- Portrait of Rameau by Jacques Aved, c. 1728
- Librettist: Jean-François Marmontel
- Language: French
- Based on: Myth of Osiris
- Premiere: 12 October 1754; Palace of Fontainebleau

La naissance d'Osiris, ou La fête Pamilie (The Birth of Osiris, or The Festival of Pamylia) is a one-act opera by Jean-Philippe Rameau, first performed on 12 October 1754 at Fontainebleau to celebrate the birth of King Louis XV's grandson, the future Louis XVI. The libretto is by Rameau's frequent collaborator Louis de Cahusac. Cahusac styled the work a ballet allégorique ("allegorical ballet"), but it is usually categorised as an acte de ballet. Its slender plot tells of Jupiter's announcement to a group of Egyptian shepherds of the birth of the god Osiris, who symbolises the baby prince. The piece may have started life as part of a larger work, Les beaux jours de l'Amour, an opéra-ballet Rameau and Cahusac planned but never completed for reasons which are still uncertain.

== Background and performance history ==
Musicologists now think that Rameau and Cahusac originally intended La naissance d'Osiris to be part of a multi-act opéra-ballet called Les beaux jours de l'Amour. There is some evidence this work was substantially complete by May 1751, but for unknown reasons it was never staged. The other acts were Nélée et Myrthis (never completed and unperformed until the 20th century) and Anacréon, first performed separately at Fontainebleau on 23 October 1754. The Rameau scholar Sylvie Bouissou believes that La naissance would have been the first act of Les beaux jours de l'Amour.

Like Anacréon, La naissance d'Osiris was salvaged for performance before the court at Fontainebleau. It thus became one of a series of operas celebrating the births of the children of the Dauphin of France and his wife Maria Josepha. On this occasion the royal baby was the Duc de Berry, the future King Louis XVI. The conductor Hugo Reyne notes the historical irony of identifying Louis XVI with Osiris, a god who was murdered, just as Louis was to be guillotined in 1793. The opera appeared on 12 October 1754 as part of a triple bill alongside revivals of Rameau's Pigmalion and Les incas de Pérou (the second act of the 1735 opéra-ballet Les Indes galantes). Documents show it went into rehearsal on 26 August, three days after the birth of the prince. The manuscripts show it was adapted for the occasion from Les beaux jours de l'Amour; originally Pamilie was merely an unnamed "shepherdess".

A lengthy account of the premiere appeared in the October 1754 edition of the journal Le Mercure de France. In the same issue, Cahusac explained the Egyptian background of the work:

As she was leaving the temple of Jupiter, a Theban woman named Pamyles heard a voice announcing the birth of a hero who would one day bring happiness to Egypt. This hero was Osiris, whom Pamyles brought up and who was subsequently one of the most illustrious benefactors of humanity. To preserve the memory of this event, the Egyptians established the Festival of Pamylia.

Osiris had already featured in the first act of Rameau's opéra-ballet Les fêtes de l'Hymen et de l'Amour (premiered 1747 and revived in July 1754). The reviewer in Le Mercure de France described the richness of the scenery in La naissance: the pillars of the temple were carved with hieroglyphics; there were sphinxes and a palm-tree. He also gave a detailed account of the final dance in which the ballerina Mademoiselle Catinon played Cupid and Mademoiselle Puvigné a shepherdess. The reviewer praised the singing of the prima donna Marie Fel as Pamylie.

There is no evidence La naissance d'Osiris was ever revived in the 18th century, probably because it was too closely linked with the occasion of the premiere. However, Rameau did reuse some of the music in his later works: Anacréon, Les Paladins and Les Boréades.

== Music ==
The work is predominantly pastoral in style, containing four musettes (numbers which employ a musette de cour, a type of bagpipe). "La flamme des éclairs, les éclats du tonnerre" is unusually virtuosic for a bass aria. It appears that the performers found some of the music so technically challenging that it was omitted from the premiere; this virtuosic writing probably derives from Italian musical style. The overture too shows Italian influence; it is in three parts (quick-slow-quick) and the music of the last section is reprised in the final chorus of the opera.

== Roles ==
Roles, voice types, premiere cast
| Role | Voice type | Premiere cast |
|---|---|---|
| Pamilie | soprano | Marie Fel |
| Un berger (a shepherd) | haute-contre | François Poirier |
| Le grand prêtre de Jupiter (the high priest of Jupiter) | basse-taille (bass-baritone) | Nicolas Gélin |
| Jupiter | basse-taille | Claude-Louis-Dominique Chassé de Chinais |
| Une bergère (a shepherdess) | soprano | |
Chorus: Shepherds and shepherdesses, priests and people

== Synopsis ==
Scene: The stage shows the temple of Jupiter

The shepherds rejoice at the peace their land enjoys; there is only one thing missing to make their happiness complete (chorus: "Coulez jours de paix, coulez jours heureux"). They bring their presents into the temple of Jupiter. A shepherd sings a musette celebrating the return of Spring and his love for Sylvie (musette: "Du printemps sur l'herbe fleurie"). A shepherdess vows to remain faithful to her lover (ariette: "Non, non, une flamme volage"). The sky darkens, lightning flashes and thunder rumbles; believing it is the wrath of Jupiter, the terrified shepherds start to flee (chorus: "Jupiter s'arme de la foudre"), but the High Priest reassures them that the god is pleased with their sacrifices and has good news for them (ariette: "La flamme des éclairs, les éclats du tonnerre"). The sky clears and Jupiter himself descends accompanied by Cupid and the Graces. He promises the people an era of peace and announces the birth of a hero (air: "Il est né, ce héros que vos vœux demande"). The priests pay homage to Jupiter and the shepherds rejoice (chorus: "Chants d'allégresse et de victoire", ariette for a shepherdess: "Volez, plaisirs, régnez, aimables jeux"). Jupiter returns to heaven, leaving Cupid behind to rule the earth. The opera concludes with a divertissement of dances, choruses and airs in praise of Cupid.

== Recordings ==
- La naissance d'Osiris Stéphanie Révidat (Pamilie), Céline Ricci (Une bergère), François-Nicolas Geslot (Un berger), Bertrand Chuberre(Le grand prêtre), Florian Westphal (Jupiter), La Simphonie du Marais, conducted by Hugo Reyne (Musiques à la Chabotterie, 2006)
- On Rameau, Maître à Danser along with Daphnis et Eglé, Les Arts Florissants conducted by William Christie (1 DVD, Alpha, 2014)
- Orchestral suite, Capella Savaria, conducted by Mary Térey-Smith (Naxos, 1997)

== Sources ==
- Original libretto: La Naissance d'Osiris, ou La Feste Pamilie, Ballet Allégorique, in Fragments représentés devant le Roi à Fontainebleau le [12] Octobre 1754, Paris Ballard, s.d., pp. 3–14 (accessibile for free online at Books Google)
- Bouissou, Sylvie Jean-Philippe Rameau: Musicien des lumières (Fayard, 2014)
- Girdlestone, Cuthbert, Jean-Philippe Rameau: His Life and Work (Dover, 1969)
- Sadler, Graham The Rameau Compendium (Boydell, 2014)
- Booklet notes to the Reyne recording (2006) by Hugo Reyne and Patrick Florentin
