= Zaïs =

1748 opera by Jean-Philippe Rameau

- Opera by Jean-Philippe Rameau
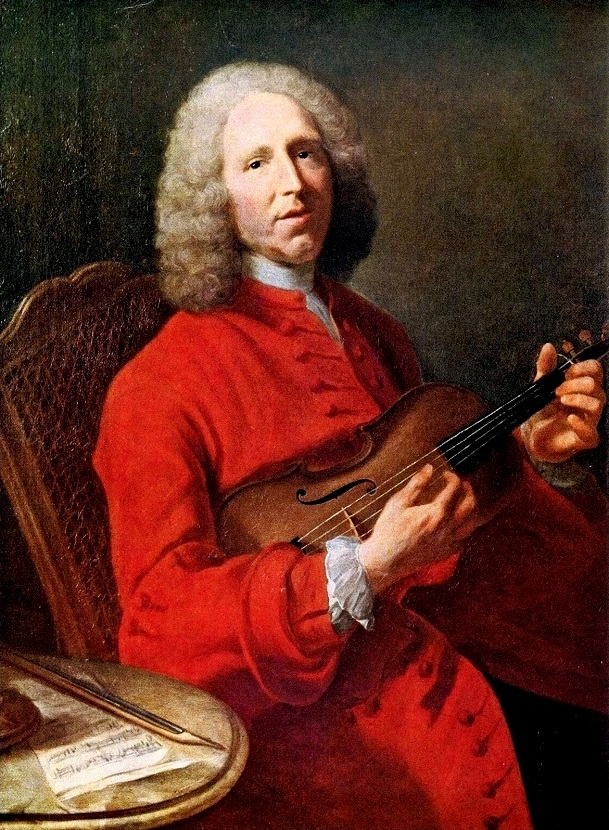
- Portrait of Rameau by Jacques Aved, c. 1728
- Librettist: Louis de Cahusac
- Language: French
- Premiere: 29 February 1748; Paris Opera

Zaïs is an opera by Jean-Philippe Rameau first performed on 29 February 1748 at the Opéra in Paris. It takes the form of a pastorale héroïque in four acts and a prologue. The librettist was Louis de Cahusac.

The score is particularly remarkable for its overture, which depicts the emergence of the four elements out of chaos. It looks back to Jean-Féry Rebel's ballet Les élemens and forward to Haydn's overture for his oratorio The Creation.

== Roles ==
According to the published libretto

Role	Voice type	Premiere Cast
Zaïs, Genie of the air	haute-contre	Pierre Jélyotte
Zélidie	soprano	Marie Fel
Oromasès, King of the Genies	basse-taille (bass-baritone)	M Albert
Cindor, a sylph, confidant of Zaïs	basse-taille	François Le Page
Une sylphide	soprano	Mlle Rotisset de Romainville
Amour (Cupid)	soprano	Mlle Chefdeville
Un sylphe	haute-contre	François Poirier
La grande prêtresse de l'Amour (High Priestess of Cupid)	soprano	Mlle Rotisset de Romainville
Chorus: Génies des Éléments (Genies of the Elements), sylphes et sylphides de la Cour de Zaïs (male and female sylphs of the court of Zaïs), bergers et bergères (shepherds and shepherdesses), chasseurs et chasseresses (hunters and huntresses)

== Synopsis ==
Zaïs, a genie, disguises himself as a shepherd to win the love of a shepherdess, Zélide. After a series of ordeals in which Zaïs shows he is willing to give up his magic powers for his love, Oromases, the king of the genies, grants Zélide immortality so the couple can marry.

== Recordings ==
- Zaïs, John Elwes (Zaïs), Marjanne Kweksilber (Zélidie), Max van Egmond (Oromazès), David Thomas (Cindor), Mieke van der Sluis (Une Sylphide/ La Grande Prêtresse de l'Amour), Jane Marsch (L'Amour), René Jacobs (Un Sylphe), La Petite Bande conducted by Gustav Leonhardt (3 CDs, Stil, 1975)
- Zaïs, Julian Prégardien (Zaïs), Sandrine Piau (Zélidie), Aimery Lefèvre (Oromazès), Benoït Arnould (Cindor), Amel Brahim-Djelloul (Une Sylphide/ La Grande Prêtresse de l'Amour), Hasnaa Bennani (L'Amour), Zachary Wilder (Un Sylphe), Chœur de Chambre de Namur and Les Talens Lyriques conducted by Christophe Rousset (3 CDs, Aparte, 2015)

== Sources ==
- Girdlestone, Cuthbert, Jean-Philippe Rameau: His Life and Work, New York: Dover, 1969 (paperback edition)
- Holden, Amanda (Ed.), The New Penguin Opera Guide, New York: Penguin Putnam, 2001. ISBN 0-14-029312-4
- Sadler, Graham (Ed.), The New Grove French Baroque Masters Grove/Macmillan, 1988
