= Lisis et Délie =

1753 one-act pastoral opera with music by Jean-Philippe Rameau

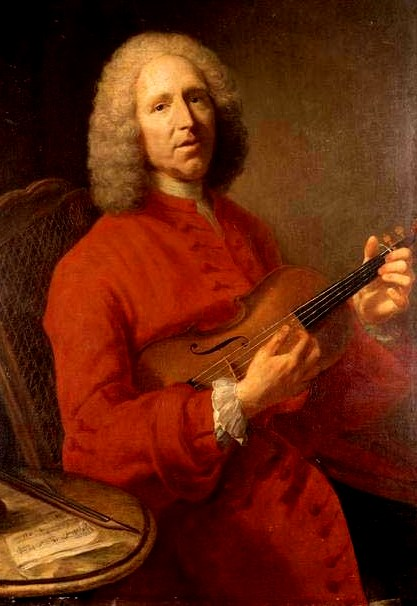
Jean-Philippe Rameau

Lisis et Délie (or Lysis et Délie) was a one-act pastoral opera with music by Jean-Philippe Rameau and a libretto by Jean-François Marmontel. The musical score is now lost. It was scheduled to appear at Fontainebleau on 6 November 1753 as part of the celebrations for the birth of the royal prince Xavier, Duke of Aquitaine. It was due to form a double bill with the comédie-ballet Les hommes (words by Germain-François Poullain de Saint-Foix, music by François-Joseph Giraud). However, it was withdrawn from performance and "La danse", the third entrée of Rameau's Les fêtes d'Hébé, was performed in its place. The reason given for the work's cancellation was that it was too similar to Rameau's Daphnis et Eglé, premiered at Fontainebleau on 30 October. The libretto was published but the music does not survive. Rameau may have reused some of it in his later operas.

== Roles ==
Roles, voice types, premiere cast
Role	Voice type	Scheduled cast for abandoned premiere
Lisis, a shepherd	haute-contre	Pierre Jélyotte
Délie, a shepherdess	soprano	Marie Fel
Chorus of shepherds and shepherdesses

== Synopsis ==
Scene: a wood with views of the countryside; a hamlet in the distance
The shepherd Lisis laments his unrequited love for Délie. Délie offers him only friendship, saying love is merely a fleeting passion. Lisis arouses her jealousy by pretending he has fallen for another shepherdess, Alcyone. Lisis arranges a festival in honour of Alcyone in which the shepherds and shepherdesses play the roles of the gods of the countryside. Délie finally admits her love for Lisis and the opera ends in celebration.

== Sources ==
- Bouissou, Sylvie Jean-Philippe Rameau: Musicien des lumières (Fayard, 2014)
- Girdlestone, Cuthbert, Jean-Philippe Rameau: His Life and Work, New York: Dover, 1969 (paperback edition)
- Sadler, Graham The Rameau Compendium (Boydell Press, 2014)
