= Les fêtes de l'Hymen et de l'Amour =

Opéra-ballet by Jean-Philippe Rameau

Les fêtes de Ramire
- Opéra-ballet by Jean-Philippe Rameau
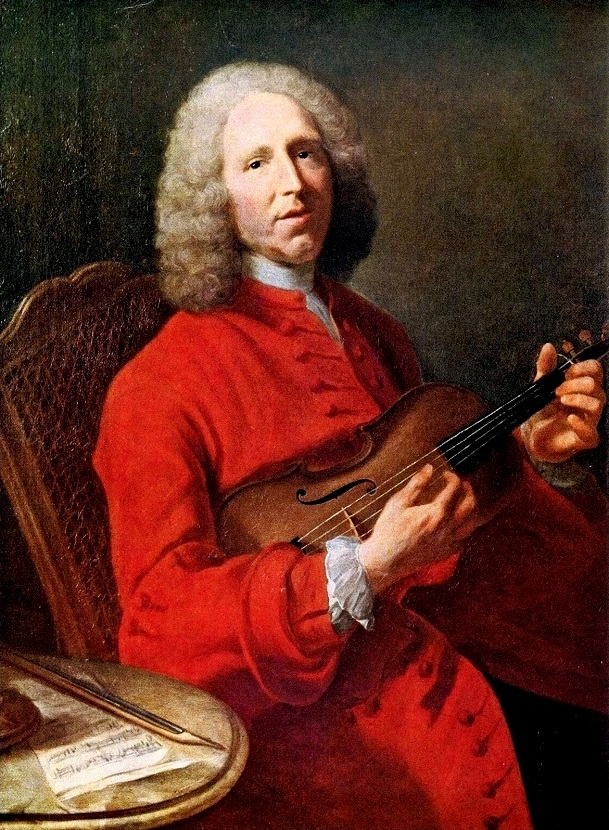
- Portrait of Rameau by Jacques Aved, c. 1728
- Librettist: Louis de Cahusac
- Language: French
- Premiere: 15 March 1747; Palace of Versailles

Les fêtes de l’Hymen et de l’Amour, ou Les dieux d'Egypte is an opéra-ballet in three entrées and a prologue by the French composer Jean-Philippe Rameau. The work was first performed on March 15, 1747, at the La Grande Ecurie, Versailles, and is set to a libretto by Louis de Cahusac. The opera was originally composed as part of the celebrations for the Dauphin's marriage to Maria Josepha of Saxony. Les fêtes de l’Hymen proved to be a popular work and by the March 1776 it had been performed exactly 106 times. The librettist, Cahusac, was especially pleased with the ways in which he had succeeded in giving especial import to the supernatural elements of the work—the plot is based on Egyptian mythology—and to allow particular use of impressive large-scale stage machinery, which was much admired by the audience. The opera contains seven ballets, a consequence of Cahusac's desire to further integrate dance and drama, which grew from the typical French devotion to ballet, particularly when allied with opera.

== Roles ==
Role	Voice type	Premiere Cast
Prologue
L'Amour (Cupid)	soprano	Marie-Angélique Coupée (or Coupé or Couppée)
Un plaisir (A pleasure)	soprano	Mlle Rotisset de Romainville
L'Hymen (The god Hymen)	haute-contre	François Poirier
Chorus:Les Graces, les Plaisirs, les Jeux, les Ris (The Graces, Pleasures, Games and Laughters); Les Vertus (the Virtues)
First entrée: Osiris
Myrrine, Amazone sauvage (A wild Amazon)	soprano	Louise Gondré
Orthésie, reine d'un peuple d'Amazones sauvages (Queen of a nation of wild Amazons)	soprano	Marie-Jeanne Fesch, "M.lle Chevalier
Osiris	haute-contre	Pierre Jélyotte
Chorus: Followers of Osiris, Orthésie and Mirrine
Second entrée: Canope
Canope (Canopus)	basse-taille (bass-baritone)	François Le Page
Agéris	haute-contre	Jean-Paul Spesoller called de La Tour (or Latour)
Memphis, jeune nymphe (A young nymph)	soprano	Mlle Mets
Le Grand-Prêtre du Dieu Canope (The High Priest of the God Canopus)	basse-taille (bass-baritone)	M Albert
Chorus: Gods and Naiads, Egyptian men and women
Third entrée: Aruéris, ou Les Isies
Aruéris, Dieu des Arts (God of the Arts)	haute-contre	Pierre Jélyotte
Orie, jeune nymphe (A young nymph)	soprano	Marie Fel
Un Égyptien (An Egyptian)	basse-taille (bass-baritone)	François Le Page
Un berger égyptien (An Egyptian shepherd)	haute-contre	François Poirier
Un troisième égyptien (A third Egyptian)	basse-taille (bass-baritone)	M Albert
Une bergère égyptienne (An Egyptian shepherdess)	soprano	Marie-Angélique Coupée
Une égyptienne (An Egyptian woman)	soprano	Mlle d'Alière
Chorus: Egyptian men and women

== Synopsis ==
=== Prologue ===
Cupid, the god of love, is in despair because he cannot subject Hymen, the god of marriage, to his power. Not even the Graces, Games, Laughters and the Pleasures can lighten his mood. Hymen appears at Cupid's palace followed by the Virtues. He says that this time he wants Cupid to triumph. Cupid is appeased and the Graces, Pleasures and Virtues dance together for the two gods.

=== First entrée: Osiris ===
Mirrine, a wild Amazon, tells her queen, Orthésie, that she objects to the arrival of Osiris in their realm and urges war against him. Osiris, however, has come in peace and he presents a ballet of the Seasons to Orthésie. Mirrine is furious when the queen and her followers are charmed by the dancing. Osiris now presents a ballet of the Muses, showing the perfection of the arts. Orthésie is won over by Osiris, but Mirrine and a band of rebels suddenly burst in. Before Mirrine can strike Osiris, Orthésie manages to disarm her. The queen announces she is willing to marry Osiris. Osiris gives thanks to Cupid and his followers celebrate with the Amazons.

=== Second entrée: Canope ===
The Egyptians celebrate the festival of the water god Canopus by the banks of the River Nile. Canopus is in love with a local Egyptian girl and has been wooing her in the guise of an ordinary Egyptian called Nilée. However, the priests are planning to sacrifice Memphis to the god at the height of the festival. As the high priest's knife is about to strike Memphis, Canopus intervenes and makes the Nile flood. He appears in person in a chariot pulled by crocodiles. He tells the people to drive away the priests and free Memphis. Canopus unties Memphis, reveals his true identity and tells her of his love for her. She begs him to have mercy on her people. Canopus consents and decrees that from now on the nearby town shall be known as "Memphis".

=== Third entrée: Aruéris, ou Les Isies ===
Aruéris (Horus), the god of the arts, announces that with the help of Cupid he will found a festival of the arts, named "Isies" in honour of his mother Isis. He encourages his love Orie to enter in spite of her lack of confidence. Competitions are held in singing, dancing and playing musical instruments. By unanimous consent, Orie wins the singing contest and her prize is marriage to Aruéris himself.

== Recording ==
- Les fêtes de l’Hymen et de l’Amour Chorus and Orchestra of Le Concert Spirituel, conducted by Hervé Niquet (Glossa, 2014)
