= Anacréon (Rameau, 1754) =

1754 opera by Jean-Philippe Rameau

- Opera by Jean-Philippe Rameau
- First page of the score
- Librettist: Louis de Cahusac
- Language: French
- Based on: Anacreon
- Premiere: 23 October 1754; Fontainebleau

Anacréon is an opera by Jean-Philippe Rameau which was first performed at Fontainebleau on 23 October 1754. Its libretto is by Louis de Cahusac. It takes the form of an acte de ballet in one act. Rameau also composed another Anacréon in 1757. The latter was an act added to a revival of the opéra-ballet Les surprises de l'Amour and has sometimes been performed and recorded as a stand-alone opera. It too features the Ancient Greek poet Anacreon as its hero, but the libretto (by Pierre-Joseph-Justin Bernard) and its plot are totally different.

== Background and performance history ==
There is some evidence that the 1754 Anacréon was not originally intended as an independent work but was to be part of a multi-act opéra-ballet entitled Les beaux jours de l'Amour. The other sections were La naissance d'Osiris and the unfinished Nélée et Myrthis. Rameau had problems completing the project and instead salvaged Anacréon and La naissance d'Osiris for performances before the royal court at Fontainebleau in 1754. The Duc d'Aumont subjected them to rehearsal and screening before they were given approval for staging because of the poor reception other works by Rameau had met the previous year. Anacréon appeared on 23 and 26 October 1754, the only performances during the composer's lifetime. Rameau and Cahusac revised the score and this version appeared posthumously at the Paris Opéra in 1766. A brief run in 1771 was the last staging of the work until the 20th century. The first modern revival was an abridged version conducted by Claude Debussy in 1909.

== Roles ==
Role	Voice type	Premiere Cast, 23 October 1754
Anacreon	bass	Claude-Louis-Dominique Chassé de Chinais
Chloë	soprano	Marie Fel
Batile (or Bathylle)	haute-contre	Pierre Jélyotte
Chorus: Égipans (Aegipans) and Bacchantes

== Synopsis ==
In this opera, the old poet Anacreon pretends he is going to marry his protégée Cloë. She is in love with the young Bathylle, also under Anacreon's protection. Finally, the poet reveals he had planned to marry the two lovers all along. The work was performed "with great success".

== Recording ==
- Anacréon (1754) Matthew Brook (Anacréon), Anna Dennis (Chloë), Agustin Prunell-Friend (Batile), Choir and Orchestra of the Age of Enlightenment conducted by Jonathan Williams (Signum Classics, 2015)

== Sources ==
- Original libretto: Anacréon, Ballet Heroique, Représenté devant le Roi à Fontainebleau, le (..) Octobre 1754, Paris, Ballard, s.d. (accessible for free online in Gallica, Bibliothèque Nationale de France
- Girdlestone, Cuthbert, Jean-Philippe Rameau: His Life and Work, New York: Dover, 1969 (paperback edition)
- Holden, Amanda (Ed.), The New Penguin Opera Guide, New York: Penguin Putnam, 2001 ISBN 0-14-029312-4
- Pitou, Spire, The Paris Opéra. An Encyclopedia of Operas, Ballets, Composers, and Performers – Rococo and Romantic, 1715–1815, Greenwood Press, Westport/London, 1985 (ISBN 0-313-24394-8)
- Sadler, Graham (Ed.), The New Grove French Baroque Masters Grove/Macmillan, 1988
- Williams, Jonathan, essay in the booklet notes to his recording of Anacréon (details listed above)
