= Naïs =

1749 Jean-Philippe Rameau opera by Jean-Philippe Rameau

- Opera by Jean-Philippe Rameau
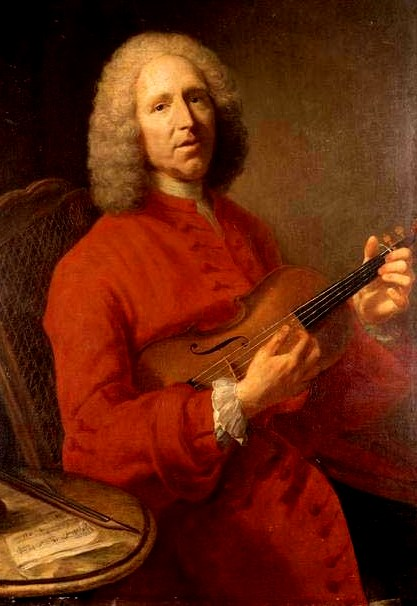
- Portrait of Rameau by Jacques Aved, c. 1728
- Librettist: Louis de Cahusac
- Language: French
- Premiere: 22 April 1749; Paris Opera

Naïs is an opera by Jean-Philippe Rameau first performed on 22 April 1749 at the Opéra in Paris. It takes the form of a pastorale héroïque in three acts and a prologue. The librettist was Louis de Cahusac, in the fourth collaboration between him and Rameau. The work bears the subtitle Opéra pour La Paix, which refers to the fact that Rameau composed the opera on the occasion of the Treaty of Aix-la-Chapelle, at the conclusion of the War of the Austrian Succession. Its original title was Le triomphe de la paix, but criticism of the terms of the treaty led to a change in the title.

The story concerns the god Neptune, who is in love with the nymph Naïs and disguises himself as a mortal to try to win her over. This takes place at the Isthmian Games at Corinth, coincidentally a festival dedicated to Neptune. The god's rivals for the affections of Naïs are the Corinthian chief Télénus and the leader of the Isthmian shepherds, Astérion. Naïs's father, the blind soothsayer, Tiresias warns Télénus and Asterion to be wary of the sea god, and they interpret it to mean they should sacrifice their rival. They are about to attack the disguised Neptune when he drowns them by summoning huge waves. Neptune reveals his identity to Naïs and takes her to his underwater palace, where he turns her into a goddess.

== Roles ==
Role	Voice type	Premiere Cast
Prologue
Jupiter	basse-taille (bass-baritone)	François Le Page
Neptune	haute-contre	Jean-Paul Spesoller called de La Tour (or Latour)
Pluton (Pluto)	bass	M Person
Flore (Flora)	soprano	Mlle Coupée
Acts 1-3
Naïs	soprano	Marie Fel
Neptune	haute-contre	Pierre Jélyotte
Palémon (Palaemon)	basse-taille	M Person
Astérion	haute-contre	François Poirier
Télénus	basse	Claude-Louis-Dominique Chassé de Chinais
Tirésie (Tiresias)	bass	François Le Page
Une bergère (A shepherdess)	soprano	Marie-Angélique Coupée
Une (autre) bergère (chantante et dansante) (Another shepherdess, singing and dancing)	ballerina and soprano	Mlle Puvignée
Protée (Proteus)	taille (bari-tenor)	

== Synopsis ==
=== Prologue: L'accord des dieux ===
The prologue has the subtitle L'accord des dieux ("The Agreement of the Gods").

Scene: The stage portrays the upper atmosphere. The titans and giants are seen down on earth heaping up mountains to scale the heavens. They are led by Discord and war. In the upper atmosphere, Jupiter appears armed with a thunderbolt and surrounded by the gods of heaven

The overture leads straight into a chorus of the titans and giants as they attack the heavens (Chorus: "Attaquons les cieux"). They aim to destroy the peace. The gods urge Jupiter to slay the rebels with his lightning (Chorus: "Lancez, lancez la foudre"). In the ensuing battle, Jupiter crushes the titans and giants, burying them under mountains. Pluto captures Discord and War ("Arrêtez, monstres, arrêtez"). The gods celebrate Jupiter's victory (Chorus: "Triomphe, ô Jupiter! redoutable vainqueur"), but he says he intends to share the glory and will divide responsibility for the universe with his brothers: he will rule over the heavens, Neptune over the seas, and Pluto over the Underworld. Flora, the gods and the different peoples of the earth celebrate the peace (Air: "Ah! que la paix nous promet de douceurs") as Spring reawakens. They express gratitude for their happiness to Jupiter (Chorus: "Heureux vainqueur, le ciel, la terre et l'onde").

=== Act 1 ===
Scene: The stage shows the shore of the Isthmus of Corinth, where the Isthmian Games are about to be celebrated. On either side are woods; the sea is in the background. The act begins as the day is breaking.

Neptune arrives at the Isthmus of Corinth disguised as a Greek mortal. He reveals the reason to his follower Palémon: he is no longer a fickle god but is deeply in love with the nymph Naïs (Air "Je ne suis plus ce dieu volage"). Palémon tells Neptune that Naïs and the Corinthians are celebrating the Isthmian Games in the god's honour that very day. Neptune says that he does not want Naïs to respect him as a god but to love him for his own merits, which is why he is disguised as an ordinary mortal. He leaves the stage and Naïs arrives. She rejects the advances of Télénus, leader of the Corinthians, saying his love makes him too gloomy (Air:"J'ai trop connu par vos soupirs"). The festival begins with a chorus celebrating Neptune ("Chantons le Dieu des Eaux"). Naïs watches the games from a throne as a ballet figuré (figurative ballet) depicts boxing, wrestling and a foot race. At the end, Naïs awards a crown to the victorious wrestler. Suddenly, a fleet of shining boats appears - it is the sea gods in disguise bringing Neptune to the games. They sing the praises of Neptune and Naïs ("Chantons Naïs, chantons le dieu des mers"). Naïs is uncomfortable to hear her name linked with the god's in this way but the disguised Neptune continues his flattery of her (Ariette: "Tout cède aux charmes de tes yeux"). The disguised sea gods compete for the prize in the dance. Télénus is consumed with jealousy for his new rival.

=== Act 2 ===
Scene: The background portrays a mountain with woods, waterfalls, flowery paths etc. At its foot the entrance to a grotto is visible: on either side are asymmetrical trees whose thick-leaved branches create cradles of foliage.

Naïs, has come to consult her father, the blind prophet Tirésie, in his secluded home in the mountains (Air: "Dans ce riant séjour le divin Tirésie"). Neptune follows her and continues his wooing (Air: "L'Amour, dont je bravais l'empire") but Naïs is fearful and asks him to leave. Once alone, she confesses she is in love with the stranger (Ariette: "Ces rapides traits de flamme"). Télénus arrives and apologises for his earlier behaviour her; Naïs tells him to stop being jealous (Air vif: "La jalousie a des fureurs"). Télénus believes that he can sense a change in Naïs and there is hope for his love (Air: "Cessez, soupçons jaloux, cessez de m'alarmer").

Astérion is also in love with Naïs (Air: "Les ennuis de l'incertitude"). He arrives with his band of shepherds and shepherdesses to ask Tirésie to prophesy who Naïs will marry. The shepherds and shepherdesses charm Tirésie with their pastoral music and dancing. A shepherdess asks the seer whether she will be happy in love (Air: "Je ne sais quel ennui me presse") and he replies in the affirmative. Tirésie begins to interpret the song of the birds: he tells his listeners to beware of the wrath of the god of the sea and that Naïs will find true love. Astérion and Télénus decide that the oracle means they must sacrifice the life of their rival to appease Neptune (Chorus: "Aux armes, vengeons-nous").

=== Act 3 ===
Scene: The foreground shows a promontory whose base is washed by the sea. Both sides of the stage are covered with orange trees, myrtles and lemon trees. The background shows the sea and the horizon. The shining boats which appeared during the Isthmian Games are visible in the harbour. The act begins as night is coming to an end and the stage is lit by an indistinct light during the first scene.

As the sun rises, Neptune waits for Naïs (Air: "Mais déjà l'horizon s'éclaire"). She arrives to warn him that the Corinthians are threatening to kill him but Neptune says he is not afraid of anyone (Air: "Que l'univers entière me déclare la guerre"). Télénus and Astérion appear with a band of armed followers and burning torches ("Allumez-vous rapides feux"). They try to set fire to the sea gods' ships but huge waves overwhelm them. Naïs is terrified but Neptune finally reveals his true identity and his love for her. The earth opens and the scene changes to Neptune's underwater palace. The sea gods hymn Neptune (Chorus: "Coulez ondes") as he and Naïs declare their love for one another (Duet: "Que je vous aime"). Neptune turns Naïs into a goddess and Protée leads the festivities.

== Recordings ==
=== Complete opera ===
- Naïs Linda Russell (Naïs), Ian Caley (Neptune), Ian Caddy (Jupiter/Télénus), John Tomlinson (Pluton), Richard Jackson (Tirésie), Brian Parsons (Astérion), Antony Ransome (Palémon), English Bach Festival Chorus and Orchestra conducted by Nicholas McGegan (Erato, 1980; reissued on 2 CDs, 1995)
- Naïs Mireille Delunsch (Naïs), Jean-Paul Fouchécourt (Neptune), Alain Buet (Jupiter/Tirésie), Arnaud Marzorati(Télénus), Mathias Vidal (Astérion), Dorothée Leclair (Flore/Une bergère), Matthieu Heim (Pluton/Palémon), La Simphonie du Marais conducted by Hugo Reyne (Musiques à la Chabotterie, 2012; digital download only)
- Naïs Purcell Choir, Orfeo Orchestra György Vashegyi. Glossa 2018

=== Orchestral suite ===
- Rameau: Orchestral Suites from "Naís" and "Le temple de la gloire" Philharmonia Baroque Orchestra, conducted by Nicholas McGegan (Harmonia Mundi, 1995, 1 CD)
- On Rameau: Orchestral Suites 2 along with the suite from Zoroastre, Orchestra of the Eighteenth Century conducted by Frans Brüggen (Glossa, 2001, reissued 2010, 1 CD)

== Sources ==
- Naïs: Manuscript score at Gallica - B.N.F.
- Bouissou, Sylvie Jean-Philippe Rameau: Musicien des lumières (Fayard, 2014)
- Girdlestone, Cuthbert, Jean-Philippe Rameau: His Life and Work (Dover paperback edition, 1969)
- Sadler, Graham, article on Naïs in Holden, Amanda (Ed.), The New Penguin Opera Guide, New York: Penguin Putnam, 2001. ISBN 0-14-029312-4
- Sadler, Graham, booklet notes to the Erato recording by Nicholas McGegan (1980)
- Sadler, Graham, (Ed.), The New Grove French Baroque Masters (Grove/Macmillan, 1988)
