= Les sibarites =

Opera by Jean-Philippe Rameau

- Opera by Jean-Philippe Rameau
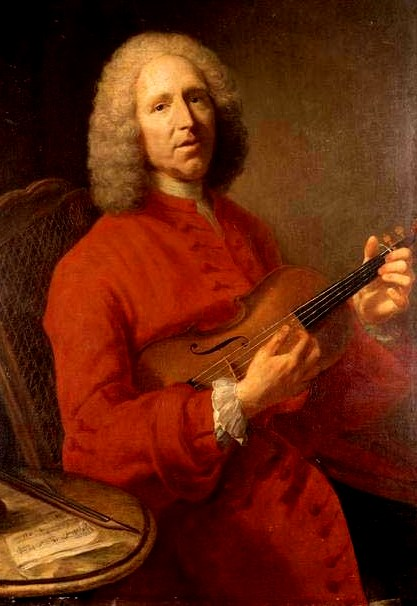
- Portrait of Rameau by Jacques Aved, c. 1728
- Librettist: Jean-François Marmontel
- Language: French
- Based on: Sybaris and Crotone
- Premiere: 13 November 1753; Palace of Fontainebleau

Les sibarites (The Sybarites) is an opera in the form of a one-act acte de ballet by Jean-Philippe Rameau, first performed on 13 November 1753 at Fontainebleau. The libretto is by Jean-François Marmontel. It tells the story of a war between Sybaris and Croton. The conflict ends when the king and queen of the two cities fall in love with each other. The work was later incorporated into a revival of Rameau's opéra-ballet Les surprises de l'Amour in 1757.

== Roles ==
Role	Voice type	Premiere Cast, 13 November 1753 (Conductor: )
Hersilide, newly elected Queen of Sybaris	soprano	Marie-Jeanne Fesch 'Mlle Chevalier'
Philoé, a woman belonging to Hersilide's court	soprano	Rivière
Agis, a lord belonging to Hersilide's court	tenor (haute-contre)	François Poirier
Astole, general of the Crotoniates	bass	Henri Larrivée
A Sibarite		Besche

== Synopsis ==
Scene: The stage shows a verdant amphitheatre covered with trees forming a bower. In the background is a throne covered by a canopy of flowers. Queen Hersilide is sitting on the throne.

The people of Sybaris celebrate the coronation of their new queen (Chorus: "Régnez, mortelle adorable"). Agis and Philoé trust she will maintain the Sybarite tradition of devotion to pleasure. Hersilide pledges that her reign will bring love and happiness. The Sybarite festivities are suddenly interrupted by the noise of war (Chorus: "Quel bruit se mêle à nos concerts!"). Agis brings news that the neighbouring city of Crotone is invading Sybaris. Hersilide is undaunted and tells her people to offer flowers to the belligerent Crotoniates. Left alone, she prays to Cupid to aid her (Air: "Tendre Amour, prête-moi tes armes"). The Crotoniates arrive under their leader Astole, who rejects the Sybarites' flowers and accuses them of effeminacy ("Peuple efféminé, cœurs timides"). However, when he sees Hersilide he begins to fall in love with her. Astole says he has come to teach the Sybarites to throw off their idleness and acquire a thirst for glory, but he is disturbed to find himself succumbing to Sybaris's charms. Eventually, he agrees to let the Sybarites live under their own laws and confesses the power of Cupid. The opera ends with the Sybarites and the Crotoniates celebrating together.

== Recordings ==
- Sibaris Le Concert de l'Hostel Dieu, Franck-Emmanuel Comte (Pierre Verany label, 1999)
