= Daphnis et Eglé =

Opera by Jean-Philippe Rameau

- Opera by Jean-Philippe Rameau
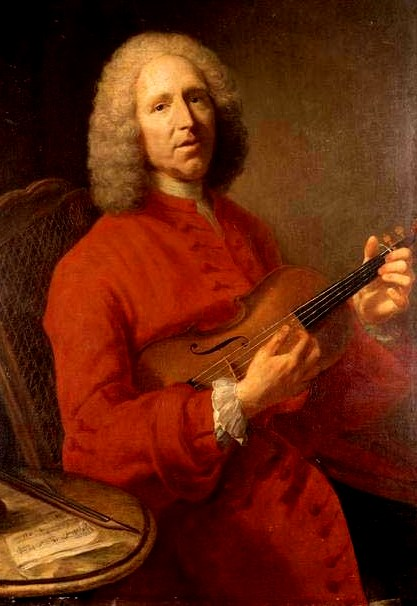
- Portrait of Rameau by Jacques Aved, c. 1728
- Librettist: Charles Collé
- Language: French

Daphnis et Eglé is an opera by Jean-Philippe Rameau. It was due to appear on 30 October 1753 at Fontainebleau, but the performance was cancelled. It takes the form of a pastorale héroïque in one act. The librettist was Charles Collé.

== Performance history ==
The opera was planned as part of the court of King Louis XV's entertainments at Fontainebleau and was intended as an afterpiece to a play by Nivelle de la Chaussée, La fausse antipathie. However, the dress rehearsal went so badly that the premiere was cancelled and the opera was never staged in Rameau's lifetime.

This was the only artistic collaboration between Collé and Rameau. Paul F. Rice has commented that this collaboration was an unhappy one, and speculated that this was due to Rameau's demands that Collé edit his libretto. This caused Collé to harbor resentment towards Rameau, even after the composer's death.

== Music ==
The opera was the first which Rameau composed after the outbreak of the Querelle des Bouffons and some of the music shows Italian influence. The score contains 23 dance airs.

== Roles ==
Role	Voice type	Cast of dress rehearsal, 29 October 1753
Daphnis, a shepherd	haute-contre	Pierre Jélyotte
Eglé, a shepherdess	soprano	Marie Fel
Le Grand Prêtre du Temple de l'Amitié (the high priest of the Temple of Friendship)	bass	Nicolas Gélin
L'Amour (Cupid)	soprano	Mlle De Riancour

== Synopsis ==
The opera tells the story of a shepherd, Daphnis, and a shepherdess, Eglé, who believe they are merely friends until Cupid reveals they are really in love with each other.

== Recordings ==
=== Video ===
- Rameau, Maître à Danser (includes Daphnis et Eglé and La naissance d'Osiris), Les Arts Florrisants, conducted by William Christie (1 DVD, Alpha, 2014)

== Sources ==
- Original libretto: Daphnis et Églé; Pastorale Heroïque en un acte, Représentée devan le Roi à Fontainebleau, Le 30 Octobre 1753, Paris, Ballard s.d. (accessible for free online at books.google)
- Girdlestone, Cuthbert, Jean-Philippe Rameau: His Life and Work, New York: Dover, 1969 (paperback edition)
- Holden, Amanda, (Ed.), The New Penguin Opera Guide, New York: Penguin Putnam, 2001. ISBN 0-14-029312-4
- Sadler, Graham, (Ed.), The New Grove French Baroque Masters Grove/Macmillan, 1988
- Sadler, Graham The Rameau Compendium (Boydell Press, 2014)
