= Nélée et Myrthis =

One-act opera by Jean-Philippe Rameau

- Opera by Jean-Philippe Rameau
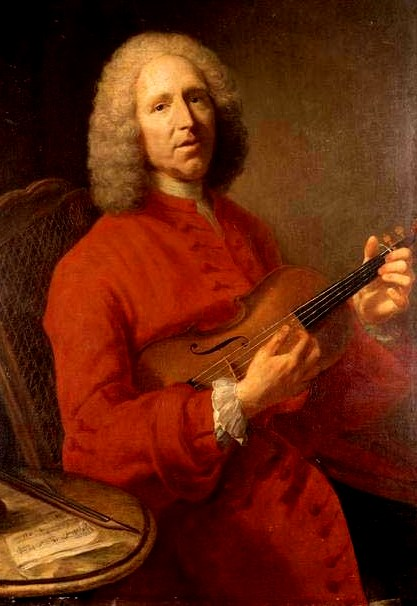
- Portrait of Rameau by Jacques Aved, c. 1728
- Librettist: Louis de Cahusac (attrib.)
- Language: French
- Premiere: 1974; Victoria State Opera, Melbourne

Nélée et Myrthis (or Mirthis) is a one-act opera by Jean-Philippe Rameau in the form of an acte de ballet. Little is known about its background: the score may be incomplete and it was never staged in Rameau's lifetime. The first known performance took place at the Victoria State Opera, Melbourne, Australia, on 22 November 1974. Nélée et Myrthis may have been intended to form part of a larger opéra-ballet to be called Les beaux jours de l'Amour. The name of the librettist is unknown but it was probably Rameau's frequent collaborator Louis de Cahusac.

== Background ==
The original title is now thought to have been Mirthis; the designation Nélée et Myrthis came about from a misreading of the manuscript. The fact that the character of Mirthis dominates the opera lends credence to this idea. Musicologists now think that Rameau originally intended Mirthis to be part of a multi-act opéra-ballet called Les beaux jours de l'Amour. There is some evidence this work was substantially complete by May 1751, but for unknown reasons it was never staged. The other acts were La naissance d'Osiris and Anacréon, both premiered at Fontainebleau in October 1754. Mirthis was never performed and the score may be incomplete - the work is missing the usual dances and choruses which end Rameau's operas and there are only two instrumental movements. If Mirthis was part of Les beaux jours de l'Amour then the librettist was almost certainly Louis de Cahusac, the author of the remaining sections. Another point in favour of this theory is that - unusually - there is no use of the supernatural, something the libretto shares in common with Cahusac's Anacréon (1754). Judging from crossings-out in the manuscript, the character of Nélée was originally named "Anacréon", suggesting that the Greek lyric poet Anacreon would have been the hero of two acts of Les beaux jours de l'Amour.

== Music ==
There are only two instrumental movements: an Entrée de triomphe (triumphal entrance) and a long chaconne, lasting 170 bars. Mirthis has most of the important vocal music and is the most developed character. She moves from being lighthearted and insouciant to acquiring tragic depth when she thinks that Nélée has abandoned her. The Rameau specialist Sylvie Bouissou draws attention to the aria "Malgré le penchant le plus tendre": "This air deserves special comment since Rameau here creates a fundamental antithesis between the sense of the words, which is vindictive in character, and the expressiveness of the music, which betrays Myrthis's profoundly tender feelings for Nélée. A dramatic disjunction of this sort would have aroused the interest of Gluck, Mozart and especially of Wagner." Nélée and Corinne are less substantial roles, although Cuthbert Girdlestone praises Nélée's aria "Un amant rebuté".

== Roles ==
| Role | Voice type |
|---|---|
| Nelée | baritone |
| Myrthis | soprano |
| Corinne | soprano |
| Deux argiennes (Two Argive women) | sopranos |

== Synopsis ==
The athlete Nélée is about to celebrate his triumph in the Argive Games. He has long been in love with the female poet Myrthis but finally announces he is tired of her indifference (Air: "Un amant rebuté"). As victor in the games, his reward is the chance to ask for anything he desires. Myrthis believes Nélée will choose her (Air: "Jouissons de la liberté") but he tells her he has a new love, Corinne. Myrthis, who has secretly been in love with Nélée all along, is now wracked with jealousy (Air: "Malgré le penchant le plus tendre"). Nélée looks forward to his triumph (Air: "Théâtre des honneurs"). In her role as poet Myrthis is forced to lead the victory celebrations (Air and chorus: "Muses, filles du ciel"). She asks Nélée to make his choice and, to her surprise, he names her; he was merely pretending to love Corinne to punish Myrthis for her pride. The opera ends in celebration (Chorus: "Amour, sois le prix de la gloire").

== Recordings ==
- Nélée et Myrthis (together with Pigmalion) Jérôme Correas (Nélée), Agnès Mellon (Myrthis), Françoise Semellaz (Corinne), Donatienne Michel-Dansac and Caroline Pelon (Deux Argiennes), Les Arts Florissants, William Christie (Harmonia Mundi, 1992)

== Sources ==
- Bouissou, Sylvie Jean-Philippe Rameau: Musicien des lumières (Fayard, 2014)
- Bouissou, Sylvie: Booklet notes to the Christie recording (1992)
- Casaglia, Gherardo (2005). "Nelée et Myrthis, 22 November 1974", in L'Almanacco di Gherardo Casaglia
- Girdlestone, Cuthbert, Jean-Philippe Rameau: His Life and Work (Dover, 1969)
- Holden, Amanda (ed.) The Viking Opera Guide (Viking, 1993)
- Sadler, Graham The Rameau Compendium (Boydell, 2014)
