= Zoroastre =

Opera by Jean-Philippe Rameau

- Opera by Jean-Philippe Rameau
- Title page of the libretto
- Librettist: Louis de Cahusac
- Language: French
- Premiere: 5 December 1749; Paris Opera

Zoroastre (Zoroaster) is an opera by Jean-Philippe Rameau, first performed on 5 December 1749 by the Opéra in the first Salle du Palais-Royal in Paris. The libretto is by Louis de Cahusac. Zoroastre was the fourth of Rameau's tragédies en musique to be staged and the last to appear during the composer's own lifetime. Audiences gave the original version a lukewarm reception, so Rameau and his librettist thoroughly reworked the opera for a revival which took place at the Opéra on 19 January 1756. This time the work was a great success and this is the version generally heard today.

== Performance history ==
The premiere of Zoroastre in 1749 was not a success; despite the magnificence of the staging, it failed to compete with Mondonville's new opéra-ballet Le carnaval du Parnasse. Rameau and Cahusac decided to rework the opera completely before offering it to the public again in 1756. Acts 2,3 and 5 were heavily rewritten and there were several modifications to the plot. This time audiences took to the opera, although the critic Melchior Grimm was withering about Cahusac's libretto: "In Zoroastre it is day and night alternately; but as the poet...cannot count up to five he has got so muddled in his reckoning that he has been compelled to make it be day and night two or three times in each act, so that it might be day at the end of the play". Zoroastre was chosen to open the new Paris opera house on January 26, 1770, the old one having burned down in 1763. It was also translated into Italian by Casanova for a performance in Dresden in 1752, although some of Rameau's music was replaced by that of the ballet master Adam. Its first modern revival was in a concert version at the Schola Cantorum, Paris in 1903. The United States premiere of the opera was staged by Boston Baroque (then known as Banchetto Musicale) at Harvard University's Sanders Theater under conductor Martin Pearlman in 1983 with Jean-Claude Orliac in the title role and James Maddalena as Abramane.

=== Libretto and music ===
Zoroastre includes some important innovations: it was the first major French opera to dispense with an allegorical prologue and its subject matter is not drawn from the Classical mythology of Greece and Rome, as was usual, but from Persian religion. There was good reason for this. As Graham Sadler writes, the opera is "a thinly disguised portrayal of Freemasonry". Cahusac, the librettist, was a leading French Mason and many of his works celebrate the ideals of the Enlightenment, including Zoroastre. The historical Zoroaster was highly regarded in Masonic circles and the parallels are obvious between Rameau's opera and an even more famous Masonic allegory, Mozart's The Magic Flute (1791), with its initiation rites conducted under the auspices of the wise "Sarastro".

== Roles ==
Roles, voice types, cast of the premiere and the revised version
Role	Voice type	Premiere cast, 5 December 1749 Conductor: André Chéron	Revised version 19 January 1756
Zoroastre	haute-contre	Pierre Jélyotte	François Poirier
Abramane	basse-taille (bass-baritone)	Claude-Louis-Dominique Chassé de Chinais	Claude-Louis-Dominique Chassé de Chinais
Amélite	soprano	Marie Fel	Marie Fel
Erinice	soprano	Marie-Jeanne Fesch, "M.lle Chevalier	Marie-Jeanne Fesch, "M.lle Chevalier
Zopire	basse-taille	Monsieur Person	Monsieur Person
Céphie	soprano	Mlle Duperey	Mlle Davaux
Zélize	soprano	Mlle Jacquet	No role
Abenis	haute-contre	François Poirier	No role
A voice from a cloud	haute-contre	Jean-Paul Spesoller called (de) La Tour (or Latour)	No role
A Salamander	basse-taille	François Le Page	No role
A Sylph	soprano	Marie-Angelique Coupé	No role
Vengeance	basse-taille (en travesti)	François Le Page	Henri Larrivée
A voice from underground	basse-taille	Monsieur Le Febvre	Monsieur Desbelles
Jealousy	soprano	Mlle Dalière	No role
Anger	soprano	Mlle Rollet	No role
First Fury	haute-contre (en travesti)	François Poireir	No role
Second Fury	taille (en travesti)	Louis-Antoine Cuvillier, père	No role
Third Fury	haute-contre (en travesti)	Monsieur La Tour	No role
The Furies		No roles	Mlles Dalière, Dubois and Duval, Mrs Le Roy and Laurent
Oromasès	basse-taille	No role	Monsieur Gelin
Narbanor	basse-taille	No role	Monsieur Cuvillier, fils

== Synopsis ==
The synopsis is based on the 1756 version

Act 1
The story takes place in the ancient kingdom of Bactria and concerns the struggle between the forces of Good, led by Zoroastre, the "founder of the Magi", and Evil, led by the sorcerer Abramane. When the opera opens, Bactria is in chaos after the death of its king, who has left behind two daughters: Amélite, the presumptive heir, and Erinice. Both are in love with Zoroastre, who is devoted to Amélite. Abramane has taken the opportunity to send Zoroastre into exile. The sorcerer also plots to seize the throne with Erinice, who wants revenge on Zoroastre for rejecting her love. Abramane conjures up demons to capture Amélite.

Act 2
Zoroastre is in exile at the palace of the king of the good genies, Oromasès. Oromasès tells Zoroastre to go and rescue Amélite and destroy the forces of evil. He puts Zoroastre through a magic initiation ritual to prepare him for the task. In the dungeons of the fortress of Bactria, Abramane and Erinice are torturing Amélite to force her to renounce the throne, when Zoroastre suddenly appears. He releases Amélite and destroys the fortress with his magic powers. Amélite is presented as queen to her joyful Bactrian subjects.

Act 3
Night. Abramane and Erinice quarrel over the disaster that has befallen their plans. Abramane hides Erinice in a cloud. At dawn, Zoroastre, Amélite and the Bactrian people assemble to worship the Supreme Being then celebrate the marriage of Zoroastre and Amélite. As the wedding ceremony takes place, Abramane arrives on a fiery chariot and kidnaps Amélite. Zoroastre prepares his magic spirits for war.

Act 4
In the temple of the god Arimane, Abramane receives news that the battle between the spirits of good and evil is going badly for him. He sacrifices to the god and summons up Hate, Vengeance and Despair.

Act 5
Erinice, now repentant, warns Zoroastre of Abramane's plan for a new battle. Abramane appears in the fiery chariot once more and reveals Amélite in chains. He calls on Zoroastre to surrender. Instead, Zoroastre calls on the gods, who strike down Abramane and his evil priests with thunderbolts. The opera ends with rejoicing as Zoroastre and Amélite are crowned king and queen of Bactria.

== Discography ==
Year	Cast (Amélite, Céphie, Zoroastre, Abramane, La Vengéance	Conductor, Opera house and orchestra	Label
1971	Lou Ann Wyckoff; Nancy Deering; Bruce Brewer; William Workman; William Workman	Richard Knapp; Hamburg Chamber Orchestra (1756 version)	LP: Turnabout
1983	Greta De Reyghere; Agnès Mellon; John Elwes; Gregory Reinhart; Philippe Cantor	Sigiswald Kuijken; Collegium Vocale Gent, La Petite Bande (1756 version)	4 LPs/3 CDs, Deutsche Harmonia Mundi, 1983)
2001	Gaëlle Méchaly; Stéphanie Révidat; Mark Padmore; Nathan Berg; Mattieu Lécroart	William Christie, Les Arts Florissants (1756 version)	CD: Erato Records
2006	Sine Bundgaard; Ditte Andersen; Anders Jerker Dahlin; Evgueny Alexeyev; Lars Arvidson	Christophe Rousset, Les Talens Lyriques, Chorus of the Drottningholm Palace Theatre (1756 version)	DVD: Opus Arte
2022	Jodie Devos; Gwendoline Blondeel; Reinoud van Mechelen; Tassis Christoyannis; David Witczak	Alexis Kossenko, Les Ambassadeurs – La Grande Écurie, Chœur de chambre de Namur (1749 version)	CD: Alpha Classics
