= Catherine-Élisabeth Allais =

Catherine-Élisabeth Allais, also known as Élisa Allais (c.1765–1786), was a French painter from a prominent Parisian family of artists. She is frequently cited in art dictionaries and reference works as a possible identity for various eighteenth-century artists known as "Mlle Allais," who appear in Salon and exhibition records without a given name.

== Life ==
Catherine-Élisabeth Allais was born in 1764 or 1765 into a large and prominent Parisian family of artists. Her father, Jean-Louis Allais, a member of the Académie de Saint-Luc, worked as a maître sculpteur in the Faubourg Saint-Martin, while her mother, Élisabeth Le Beau, was the daughter of a Parisian wine merchant. Her brother Louis-Jean Allais became a successful engraver.

Bénézit Dictionary of Artists notes that Catherine-Élisabeth was known as Elisa and worked as a painter. Salon and newspaper records suggest that she was one of several women artists in the extended Allais family, a circumstance that has led to confusion in art historical reference works.

According to the Revue universelle des arts, Catherine Elizabeth Allais died on 22 August 1786 at the age of 21. However, this is the same date given for her father's death in Bénézit, suggesting it may be mistaken.

== Identity and attribution ==
Several women artists in Paris in the late 18th century are recorded under the name "Mlle Allais" (Miss Allais), and historical sources often conflate them. Catherine-Élisabeth Allais is the most commonly suggested identity of "Mlle Allais" in reference works. Germain Greer's The Obstacle Race is among secondary sources which present a composite biography of Allais under the name Catherine-Élisabeth:

In 1760 Catherine Elisabeth Allais showed work at the Exposition de la Jeunesse. Her father, the sculptor, had sent her to study with the distinguished portrait painter Aved. In 1769 we find her making an unsuccessful bid to join the Académie Royale. From 1779-87 she sent pastel portraits to the Salon de la Correspondance and there her known career ended.

However, it is likely that these descriptions refer to several different women, and the precise attribution of Catherine-Élisabeth Allais' works remains uncertain.

1. Catherine-Élisabeth Allais (c.1765–1786) Catherine-Élisabeth Allais is recorded as Elisa Allais in her father's entry in Bénézit and is believed to have worked as a painter, though no surviving works can be securely attributed to her. She was likely based near her in the Faubourg Saint-Martin and reportedly died young in 1786.
2. Expositions de la Jeunesse (1759–61) Catalogues of the Expositions de la Jeunesse around 1760 record a Mlle Allais as exhibiting during this period. Elsewhere she is referred to as Mlle Hallet, Hallé, or Alet. This artist was a pupil of Jacques-André Aved and appears to have produced oil portraits. Since these exhibitions occurred well before Catherine-Élisabeth's birth, the exhibitor at the Expositions de la Jeunesse cannot have been her. The pupil of Aved later made a failed attempt to gain membership in the Académie Royale, where Chardin, Pajou, Pierre, Lagrenée and Vien were cited as references.
3. Salon de la Correspondance (1779) A Mlle Allais also exhibited pastels at the Salon de la Correspondance in 1779, with her address listed as rue des Fossés Saint-Germain. Catherine-Élisabeth Allais would have been only 14 at the time, making it possible but unlikely that she was the exhibitor. This pastellist was more likely an otherwise unknown daughter of the artist Jacques-Charles Allais. Press reports from 1771 describe a pastellist, a pupil of Maurice Quentin de La Tour, living on rue de l’Arbre-Sec, who had also been trained by her father, who had died twelve years earlier, suggesting a connection to Jacques-Charles Allais's family rather than to Catherine-Élisabeth.
