= Charles Collé =

French dramatist (1709–1783)

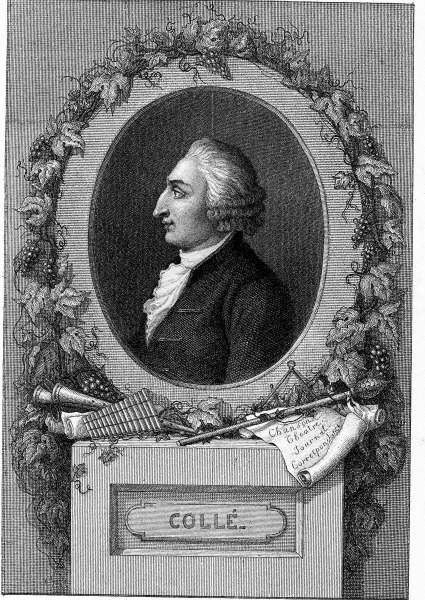
Anonymous 18th-century engraving.

Charles Collé (14 April 1709 – 3 November 1783) was a French dramatist and songwriter.

== Biography ==
The son of a notary, he was born in Paris. He became interested in the rhymes of Jean Heguanier, the most famous writer of couplets in Paris. From a notary's office, Collé was transferred to that of the receiver-general of finance, where he remained for nearly twenty years. When about seventeen, however, he made the acquaintance of Alexis Piron, and afterwards, through Gallet (1698?–1757), of Panard. The example of these three masters of the vaudeville decided his future but also made him diffident; and for some time he composed nothing but amphigouris—verses whose merit was measured by their unintelligibility. The friendship of the younger Crébillon helped broaden his horizons, and the establishment in 1729 of the famous "Société du Caveau", a drinking-club known for its wit and good company, gave him a field for the display of his fine talent for popular song.

In 1739 the Society of the Caveau, which numbered among its members Helvétius, Charles Pinot Duclos, Pierre Joseph Bernard, called Gentil-Bernard, Jean-Philippe Rameau, Alexis Piron, and the two Crébillons, was dissolved, and was not reconstituted till twenty years afterwards. His first and his best comedy, La Vérité dans le vin, appeared in 1747.

Meanwhile, Louis Philippe I, Duke of Orléans, who was an excellent comic actor, particularly in representations of low life, and had been looking out for an author to write suitable parts for him, made Collé his reader. It was for the duke and his associates that Collé composed the greater part of his Théâtre de société. In 1763 Collé produced at the Théâtre Français Dupuis et Desronais, a successful sentimental comedy, which was followed in 1771 by La Veuve, which was a complete failure. In 1774 appeared La Partie de chasse de Henri Quatre (partly taken from Dodsley's King and the Miller of Mansfield), Collé's last and best play.

From 1748 to 1772, besides these and a multitude of songs, Collé was writing his Journal, a collection of literary and personal strictures on his companions as well as on their enemies, on Piron as on Voltaire, on La Harpe as on Pierre Corneille.

Collé's lyrics are frank and jovial, though often licentious. The subjects are love and wine; occasionally, however, as in the famous lyric (1756) On the capture of Port Mahon, for which the author received a pension of 600 livres, the note of patriotism is struck with no unskilful hand, while in many others Collé shows considerable epigrammatic force.

== Works ==
Sainte-Beuve saw in Collé an historical and moral witness of his time.

The plays he composed for the Duke of Orleans were collected under the title Théâtre de société, 1768, 2 volumes in-8. Some of his parades are, but truncated and disfigured in Théâtre des Boulevards, 1756.

The collection of his songs, published in 1807, form 2 volumes in-18.

- 1745: La Mère rivale
- 1747: La Vérité dans le vin ou les désagréments de la galanterie, comédie en 1 acte et en prose
- 1753: Daphnis et Eglé, music by Rameau
- 1762: La Partie de chasse de Henri IV
- 1763: Dupuis et Desronais, comedy in 3 acts and in free verse, premiered by les comédiens français ordinaires du Roi 17 January
- 1768: L'Île sonnante, music by Monsigny
- 1770: La Veuve, comedy
- 1777: La Tête à perruque ou le Bailli, petit conte dramatique en 1 petit acte et en prose
- 1807: Journal historique ou Mémoires littéraires, Paris, 3 volumes in-8; reprint by H. Bonhomme, 1868
