= New System of Musical Theory =

Treatise of music theory

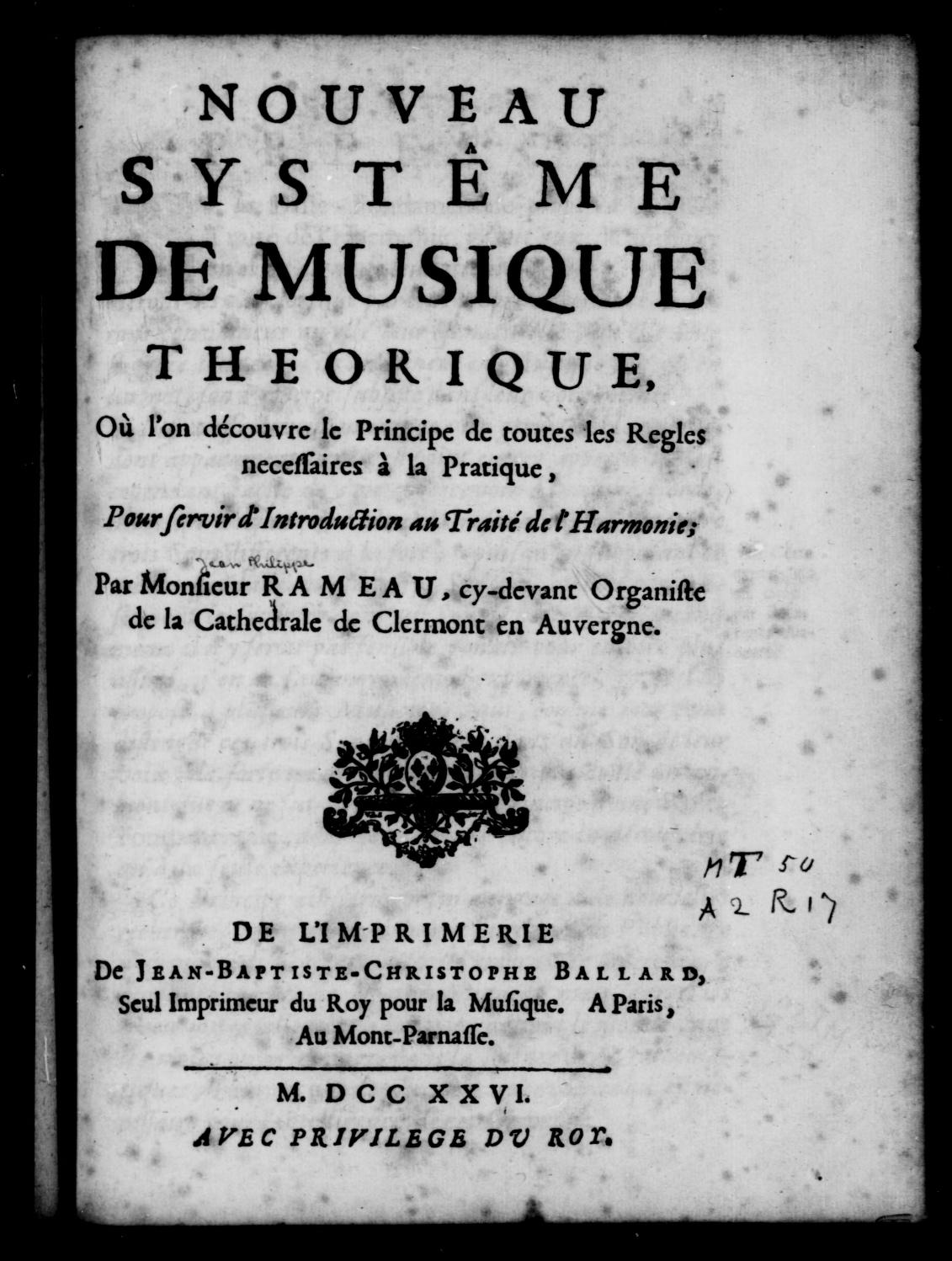
Title page of Rameau’s New System of Musical Theory

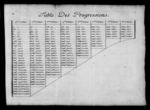
Table showing intervallic progression from Rameau’s New System of Musical Theory

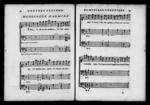
Illustration of continuo and fundamental bass in Rameau’s New System of Musical Theory

New System of Musical Theory (French: Nouveau système de musique théorique) published in 1726, is the second treatise on musical theory written by the composer Jean-Philippe Rameau.

Rameau wrote the work four years after the publication of his first theoretical work, the Treatise on Harmony Reduced to its Natural Principles (French: Traité de l'harmonie réduite à ses principes naturels) (1722). The Treatise had expounded a theory based on the standard Pythagorean tuning.

However, some time after publishing his Treatise, Rameau became aware of the work of the scientist Joseph Sauveur who had described the phenomenon of overtones and codified the harmonic sequence scientifically. This was very exciting for Rameau, because it provided an empirical scientific basis for his own theories, for which he had only, in the Treatise, been able to provide mathematical proof. The title Rameau chose for his new work was taken from the title of Fontenelle's report to Royal Academy of Sciences on Sauveur's work (Sur un nouveau système de musique).

The New System introduced some important new theoretical ideas, including geometric proportion and the concept of the subdominant. However, there was no substantial theoretical investigation of the new idea of the “corps sonore”. Rather, the New System served as a supplement and elaboration of the Treatise — indeed Rameau presented the New System as an introduction to the earlier work.
