= Louis de Cahusac =

French playwright, librettist, and Freemason (1706-1759)

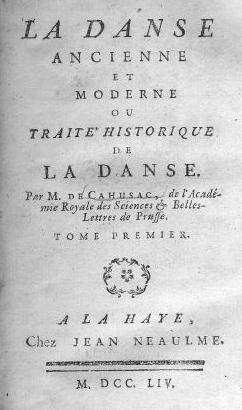
- Louis de Cahusac; La danse ancienne et moderne (The Hague 1754)
- Born: 6 April 1706; Montauban, Quercy, Kingdom of France
- Died: 9 June 1759 (aged 53); Paris
- Occupations: Playwright; Librettist

Louis de Cahusac (6 April 1706 – 22 June 1759) was an 18th-century French playwright, librettist, and Freemason. He is most famous for his work with the composer Jean-Philippe Rameau. He provided the libretti for several of Rameau's operas, namely Les fêtes de l'Hymen et de l'Amour (1747), Zaïs (1748), Naïs (1749), Zoroastre (1749; revised 1756), La naissance d'Osiris (1754), and Anacréon (the first of Rameau's operas by that name, 1754). He is also credited with writing the libretto of Rameau's final work, Les Boréades (c. 1763). Cahusac contributed to the Encyclopédie and was the lover of Marie Fel.

In 1754, he published La Danse ancienne et moderne ou Traité historique de la danse (The Hague, Jean Neaulme).

Among Rameau's librettists, he was the one whose collaboration lasted the longest.

Cahusac's one-act comic play Zeneïde was performed in 1743. He was part of the circle of the art collector Comte de Caylus and the actress Marie-Anne-Catherine Quinault. In their 1745 collection Le Recueil de ces Messieurs (The Collection of these Gentlemen), the story "Double Jeu" was penned by Cahusac. Under the title "Double Game," it is available in an English translation by Kate Deimling, published by Obscure Publications and available at Indiana State University's website.

== Sources ==
- Cuthbert Girdlestone Jean-Philippe Rameau: His Life and Work (Dover paperback edition, 1969)
- The New Grove French Baroque Masters ed. Graham Sadler (Grove/Macmillan, 1988)
