= Jean-Philippe Rameau =

French composer and music theorist (1683–1764)

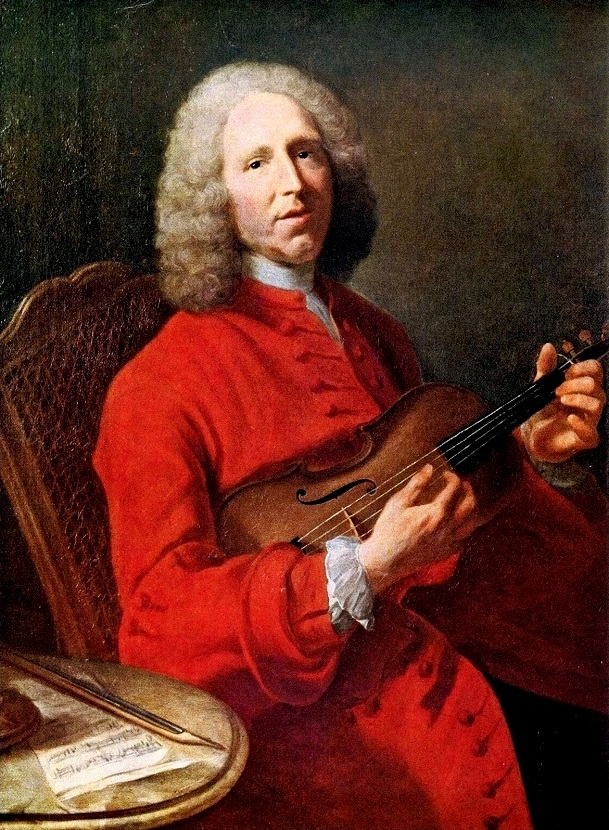
- Portrait by Jacques Aved, 1728
- Born: 25 September 1683; Dijon, Kingdom of France
- Died: 12 September 1764 (aged 80); Paris, Kingdom of France
- Occupations: Composer; music theorist
- Era: Baroque
- Works: List of operas Treatise on Harmony

Jean-Philippe Rameau (/rɑːˈmoʊ/; French: [ʒɑ̃filip ʁamo]; 25 September 1683 – 12 September 1764) was a French composer and music theorist of the late Baroque era. Regarded as one of the most important French composers and music theorists of the 18th century, he replaced Jean-Baptiste Lully as the dominant composer of French opera and is also considered the leading French composer of his time for the harpsichord, alongside François Couperin.

Little is known about Rameau's early years. It was not until the 1720s that he won fame as a major theorist of music with his Treatise on Harmony (1722) and also in the following years as a composer of masterpieces for the harpsichord, which circulated throughout Europe. He was almost 50 before he embarked on the operatic career on which his reputation chiefly rests today. His debut, Hippolyte et Aricie (1733), caused a great stir and was fiercely attacked by the supporters of Lully's style of music for its revolutionary use of harmony.

Nevertheless, Rameau's pre-eminence in the field of French opera was soon acknowledged, and he was later attacked as an "establishment" composer by those who favoured Italian opera during the controversy known as the Querelle des Bouffons in the 1750s. Rameau's music had gone out of fashion by the end of the 18th century, and it was not until the 20th that serious efforts were made to revive it. Today, his work is frequently performed and recorded.

== Life ==
The details of Rameau's life are generally obscure, especially concerning his first forty years, before he moved to Paris for good. He was a secretive man, and neither his wife nor his four children knew anything of his early life, which explains the scarcity of biographical information available.

=== Early years, 1683–1732 ===
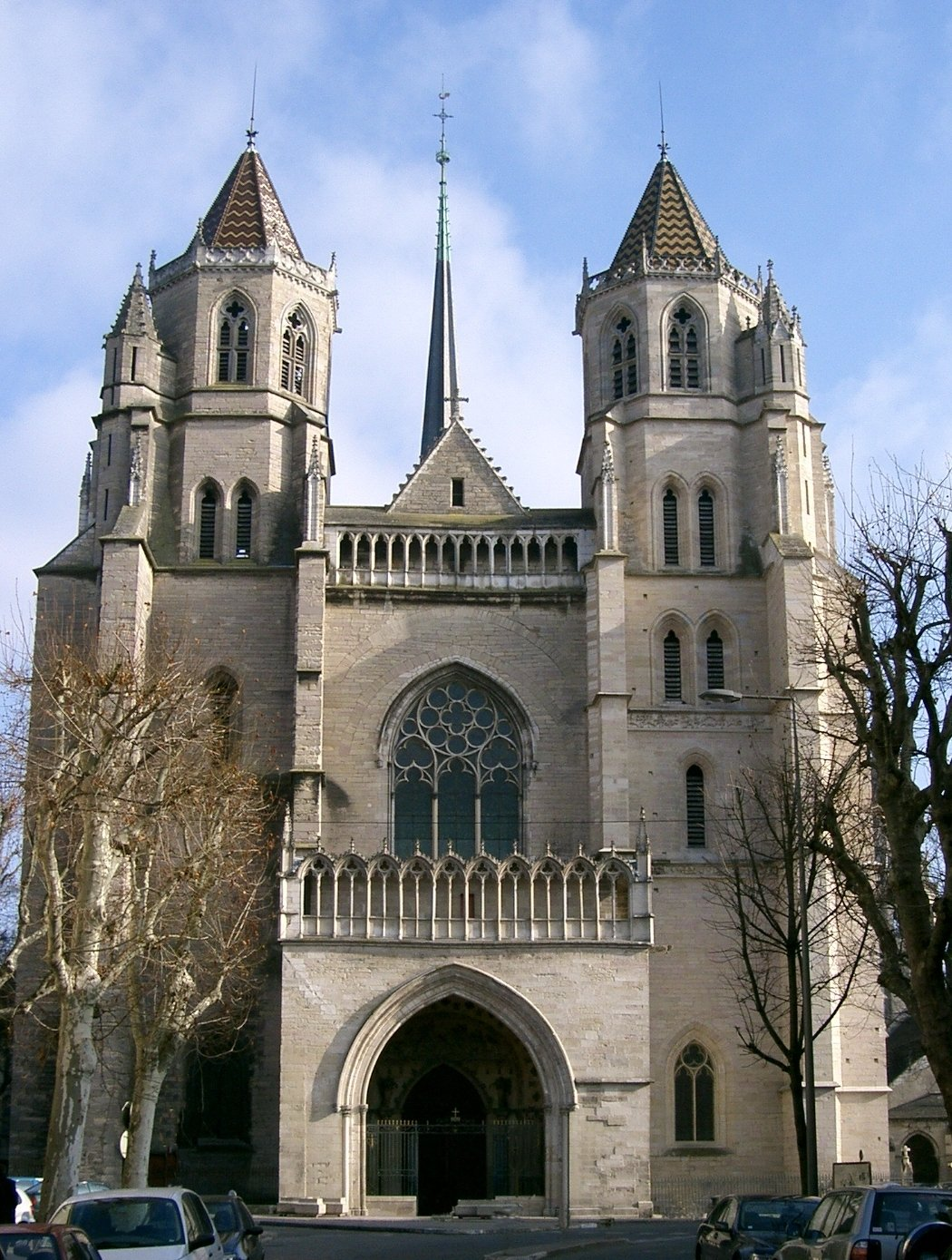
The Cathedral of Saint-Bénigne, Dijon

Rameau's early years are particularly obscure. He was born on 25 September 1683 in Dijon, and baptised the same day. His father, Jean, worked as an organist in several churches around Dijon, and his mother, Claudine Demartinécourt, was the daughter of a notary. The couple had eleven children, five girls and six boys, of whom Jean-Philippe was the seventh.

Rameau was taught music before he could read or write. He was educated at the Jesuit college at Godrans in Dijon, but he was not a good pupil and disrupted classes with his singing, later claiming that his passion for opera had begun at the age of twelve. Initially intended for the law, Rameau decided he wanted to be a musician, and his father sent him to Italy, where he stayed for a short while in Milan. On his return, he worked as a violinist in travelling companies, and then as an organist in provincial cathedrals, before moving to Paris for the first time. There, in 1706, he published his earliest-known compositions: the harpsichord works that make up his first book of Pièces de Clavecin, which show the influence of his friend Louis Marchand.

In 1709, he moved back to Dijon to take over his father's job as organist in the main church. The contract was for six years, but Rameau left before then and took up similar posts in Lyon and Clermont-Ferrand. During that period, he composed motets for church performance as well as secular cantatas.

In 1722, he returned to Paris for good, and there he published his most important work of music theory, Traité de l'harmonie (Treatise on Harmony). That soon won him a great reputation, and it was followed in 1726 by his Nouveau système de musique théorique. In 1724 and 1729 (or 1730), he also published two more collections of harpsichord pieces.

Rameau took his first tentative steps into composing stage music when the writer Alexis Piron asked him to provide songs for his popular comic plays written for the Paris Fairs. Four collaborations followed, beginning with L'endriague in 1723, but none of the music has survived.

On 25 February 1726, Rameau married the 19-year-old Marie-Louise Mangot, who came from a musical family from Lyon, and was a good singer and instrumentalist. The couple had four children, two boys and two girls, and the marriage is said to have been a happy one.

In spite of his fame as a music theorist, Rameau had trouble finding a post as an organist in Paris.

=== Later years, 1733–1764 ===
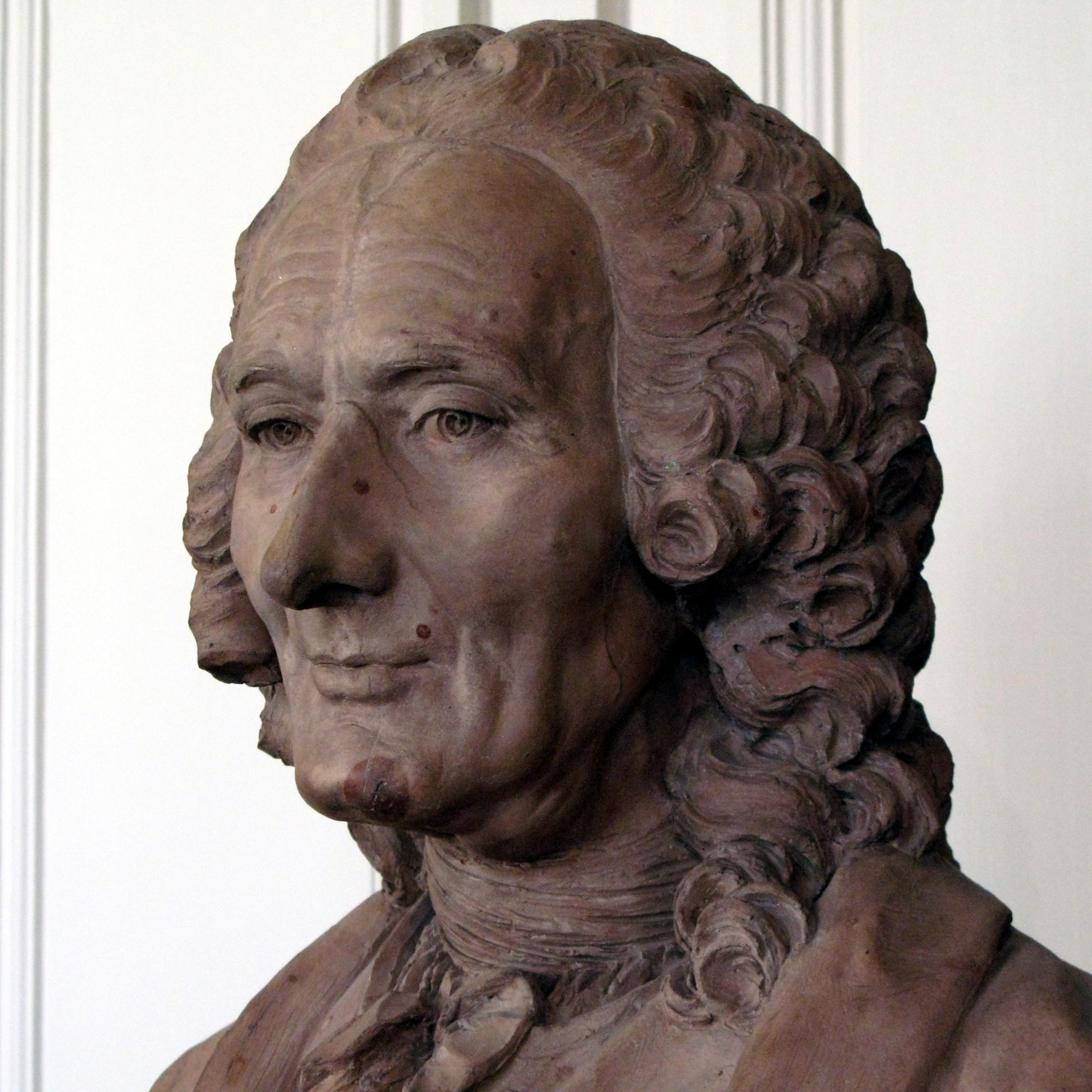
Bust of Rameau by Caffieri, 1760

It was not until he was approaching 50 that Rameau decided to embark on the operatic career on which his fame as a composer mainly rests. He had already approached writer Antoine Houdar de la Motte for a libretto in 1727, but nothing came of it; he was finally inspired to try his hand at the prestigious genre of tragédie en musique after seeing Montéclair's Jephté in 1732. Rameau's Hippolyte et Aricie premiered at the Académie Royale de Musique on 1 October 1733. It was immediately recognised as the most significant opera to appear in France since the death of Lully, though its reception drew controversy. Some, such as the composer André Campra, were stunned by its originality and wealth of invention; others found its harmonic innovations discordant and saw the work as an attack on the French musical tradition. The two camps, the so-called Lullyistes and the Rameauneurs, fought a pamphlet war over the issue for the rest of the decade.

Just before that, Rameau had made the acquaintance of the powerful financier Alexandre Le Riche de La Poupelinière, who became his patron until 1753. La Poupelinière's mistress (and later, wife), Thérèse des Hayes, was Rameau's pupil and a great admirer of his music. In 1731, Rameau became the conductor of La Poupelinière's private orchestra, which was of an extremely high quality. He held the post for 22 years, and was succeeded by Johann Stamitz and then François-Joseph Gossec. La Poupelinière's salon enabled Rameau to meet some of the leading cultural figures of the day, including Voltaire, who soon began collaborating with the composer. Their first project, the tragédie en musique Samson, was abandoned because an opera on a religious theme by Voltaire—a notorious critic of the Church—was likely to be banned by the authorities. Meanwhile, Rameau had introduced his new musical style into the lighter genre of the opéra-ballet with the highly successful Les Indes galantes. It was followed by two tragédies en musique, Castor et Pollux (1737) and Dardanus (1739), and another opéra-ballet, Les fêtes d'Hébé (also 1739). All those operas of the 1730s are among Rameau's most highly regarded works. However, the composer followed them with six years of silence, during which the only work he produced was a new version of Dardanus (1744). The reason for the interval in the composer's creative life is unknown, although it is possible he had a falling-out with the authorities at the Académie royale de la musique.

The year 1745 was a turning point in Rameau's career. He received several commissions from the court for works to celebrate the French victory at the Battle of Fontenoy and the marriage of the Dauphin to Infanta Maria Teresa Rafaela of Spain. Rameau produced his most important comic opera, Platée, as well as two collaborations with Voltaire: the opéra-ballet Le temple de la gloire and the comédie-ballet La princesse de Navarre. They gained Rameau official recognition; he was granted the title "Compositeur du Cabinet du Roi" and given a substantial pension. 1745 also saw the beginning of the bitter enmity between Rameau and Jean-Jacques Rousseau. Though best known today as a thinker, Rousseau had ambitions to be a composer. He had written an opera, Les muses galantes (inspired by Rameau's Indes galantes), but Rameau was unimpressed by this musical tribute. At the end of 1745, Voltaire and Rameau, who were busy on other works, commissioned Rousseau to turn La Princesse de Navarre into a new opera, with linking recitative, called Les fêtes de Ramire. Rousseau then claimed the two had stolen the credit for the words and music he had contributed, though musicologists have been able to identify almost nothing of the piece as Rousseau's work. Nevertheless, the embittered Rousseau nursed a grudge against Rameau for the rest of his life.

Rousseau was a major participant in the second great quarrel that erupted over Rameau's work, the so-called Querelle des Bouffons of 1752–54, which pitted French tragédie en musique against Italian opera buffa. This time, Rameau was accused of being out of date and his music too complicated in comparison with the simplicity and "naturalness" of a work like Pergolesi's La serva padrona. In the mid-1750s, Rameau criticised Rousseau's contributions to the musical articles in the Encyclopédie, which led to a quarrel with the leading philosophes d'Alembert and Diderot. As a result, Jean-François Rameau became a character in Diderot's then-unpublished dialogue, Le neveu de Rameau (Rameau's Nephew).

In 1753, La Poupelinière took a scheming musician, Jeanne-Thérèse Goermans, as his mistress. The daughter of harpsichord maker Jacques Goermans, she went by the name of Madame de Saint-Aubin, and her opportunistic husband pushed her into the arms of the rich financier. She had La Poupelinière engage the services of the Bohemian composer Johann Stamitz, who succeeded Rameau after a breach developed between Rameau and his patron. By then, however, Rameau no longer needed La Poupelinière's financial support and protection.

Rameau pursued his activities as a theorist and composer until his death. He lived with his wife and two of his children in his large suite of rooms in Rue des Bons-Enfants, which he would leave every day, lost in thought, to take a solitary walk in the nearby gardens of the Palais-Royal or the Tuileries. Sometimes he would meet the young writer Chabanon, who noted some of Rameau's disillusioned confidential remarks: "Day by day, I'm acquiring more good taste, but I no longer have any genius" and "The imagination is worn out in my old head; it's not wise at this age wanting to practise arts that are nothing but imagination."

Rameau composed prolifically in the late 1740s and early 1750s. After that, his rate of productivity dropped off, probably due to old age and ill health, although he was still able to write another comic opera, Les Paladins, in 1760. That was due to be followed by a final tragédie en musique, Les Boréades but, for unknown reasons, the opera was never produced and did not get a proper staging until the late 20th century. Rameau died on 12 September 1764 after suffering from a fever, thirteen days before his 81st birthday. At his bedside, he objected to a song being sung. His last words were, "What the devil do you mean to sing to me, priest? You are out of tune." He was buried in the church of St. Eustache, Paris on the same day of his death. Although a bronze bust and red marble tombstone were erected in his memory there by the Société de la Compositeurs de Musique in 1883, the exact site of his burial remains unknown to this day.

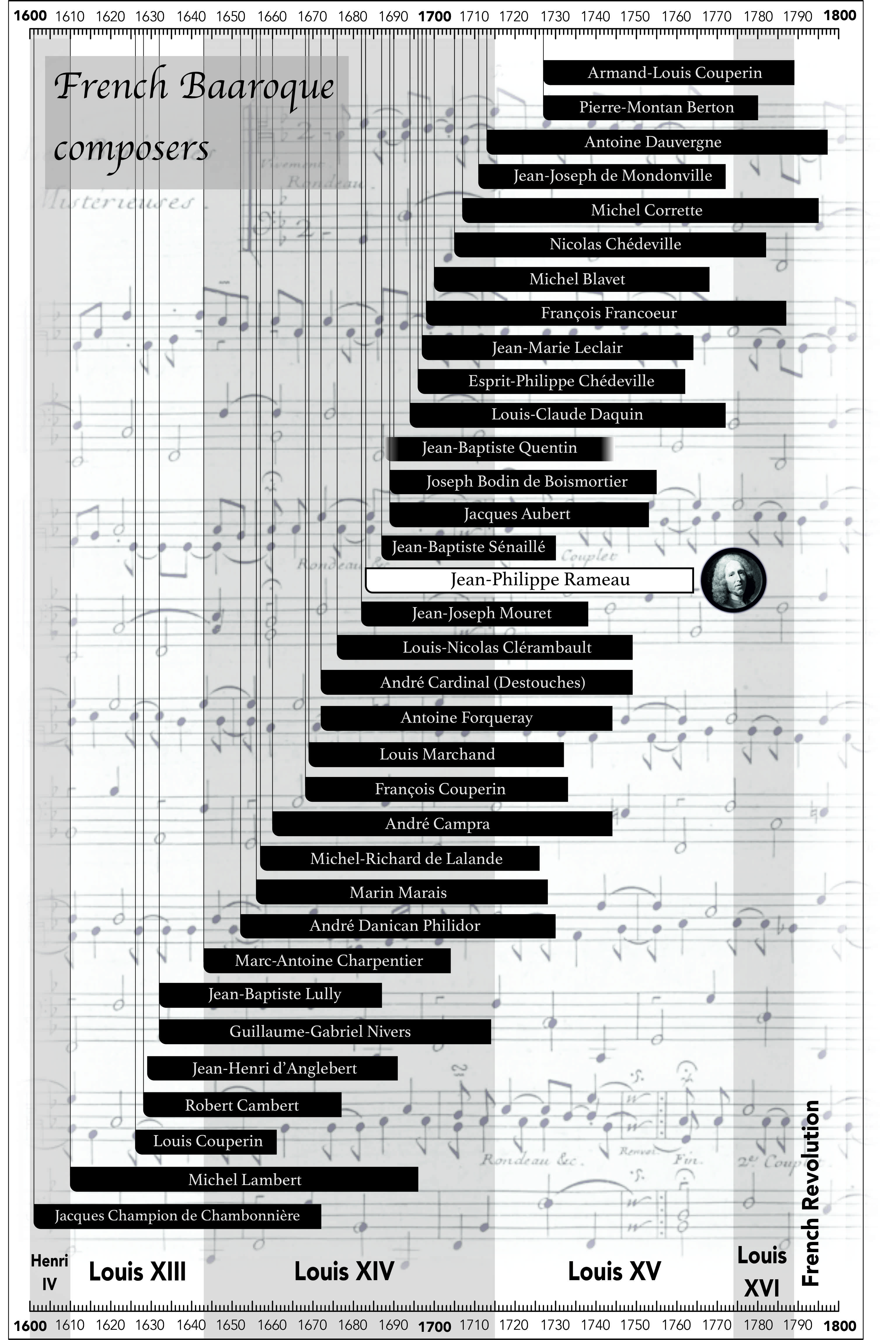
Jean-Philippe Rameau in the timeline of French Baroque Composers

=== Rameau's personality ===
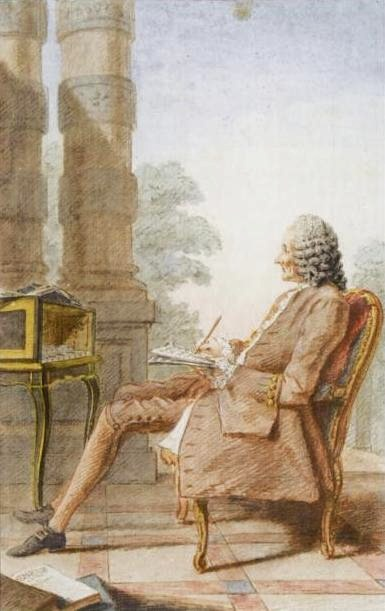
Portrait of Rameau by Louis Carrogis Carmontelle, 1760

While the details of his biography are vague and fragmentary, the details of Rameau's personal and family life are almost completely obscure. Rameau's music, so graceful and attractive, completely contradicts the man's public image and what we know of his character as described (or perhaps unfairly caricatured) by Diderot in his satirical novel Le Neveu de Rameau. Throughout his life, music was his consuming passion. It occupied his entire thinking; Philippe Beaussant calls him a monomaniac. Alexis Piron explained that "His heart and soul were in his harpsichord; once he had shut its lid, there was no one home." Physically, Rameau was tall and exceptionally thin, as can be seen by the sketches we have of him, including a famous portrait by Carmontelle. He had a "loud voice". His speech was difficult to understand, just like his handwriting, which was never fluent. As a man, he was secretive, solitary, irritable, proud of his own achievements (more as a theorist than as a composer), brusque with those who contradicted him, and quick to anger. It is difficult to imagine him among the leading wits, including Voltaire (to whom he bears more than a passing physical resemblance), who frequented La Poupelinière's salon; his music was his passport, and it made up for his lack of social graces.

His enemies exaggerated his faults, e.g. his supposed miserliness. In fact, it seems that his thriftiness was the result of long years spent in obscurity, when his income was uncertain and scanty, rather than being part of his character, because he could also be generous. He helped his nephew Jean-François when he came to Paris and also helped establish the career of Claude-Bénigne Balbastre in the capital. Furthermore, he gave his daughter Marie-Louise a considerable dowry when she became a Visitandine nun in 1750, and he paid a pension to one of his sisters when she became ill. Financial security came late to him, following the success of his stage works and the grant of a royal pension. A few months before his death, he was ennobled and made a knight of the Ordre de Saint-Michel. But he did not change his way of life, keeping his worn-out clothes, his single pair of shoes, and his old furniture. After his death, it was discovered that he possessed only one dilapidated single-keyboard harpsichord in his rooms in Rue des Bons-Enfants, yet he also had a bag containing 1691 gold louis.

== Music ==
Nouvelles suites de pièces de clavecin – Suite in A minor (1728, RCT 5)
1. Allemande

7. Gavotte et six doubles
Performed in 1953 by Marcelle Meyer

=== General character of Rameau's music ===
Rameau's music is characterised by the exceptional technical knowledge of a composer who wanted above all to be renowned as a theorist of the art. Nevertheless, it is not solely addressed to the intelligence, and Rameau himself claimed, "I try to conceal art with art." The paradox of this music was that it was new, using techniques never known before, but it took place within the framework of old-fashioned forms. Rameau appeared revolutionary to the Lullyistes, disturbed by complex harmony of his music; and reactionary to the philosophes, who only paid attention to its content and who either would not or could not listen to the sound it made. The incomprehension Rameau received from his contemporaries stopped him from repeating such daring experiments as the second Trio des Parques in Hippolyte et Aricie, which he was forced to remove after a handful of performances because the singers had been either unable or unwilling to execute it correctly.

=== Rameau's musical works ===
Rameau's musical works may be divided into four distinct groups, which differ greatly in importance: a few cantatas; a few motets for large chorus; some pieces for solo harpsichord or harpsichord accompanied by other instruments; and, finally, his works for the stage, to which he dedicated the last thirty years of his career almost exclusively. Like most of his contemporaries, Rameau often reused melodies that had been particularly successful, but never without meticulously adapting them; they are not simple transcriptions. Besides, no borrowings have been found from other composers, although his earliest works show the influence of other music. Rameau's reworkings of his own material are numerous; e.g., in Les Fêtes d'Hébé, we find L'Entretien des Muses, the Musette, and the Tambourin, taken from the 1724 book of harpsichord pieces, as well as an aria from the cantata Le Berger Fidèle.

==== Motets ====
For at least 26 years, Rameau was a professional organist in the service of religious institutions, and yet the body of sacred music he composed is exceptionally small and his organ works nonexistent. Judging by the evidence, it was not his favourite field, but rather, simply a way of making reasonable money. Rameau's few religious compositions are nevertheless remarkable and compare favourably to the works of specialists in the area. Only four motets have been attributed to Rameau with any certainty: Deus noster refugium, In convertendo, Quam dilecta, and Laboravi.

==== Cantatas ====
The cantata was a highly successful genre in the early 18th century. The French cantata, which should not be confused with the Italian or the German cantata, was "invented" in 1706 by the poet Jean-Baptiste Rousseau and soon taken up by many famous composers of the day, such as Montéclair, Campra, and Clérambault. Cantatas were Rameau's first contact with dramatic music. The modest forces the cantata required meant it was a genre within the reach of a composer who was still unknown. Musicologists can only guess at the dates of Rameau's six surviving cantatas, and the names of the librettists are unknown.

==== Instrumental music ====
Along with François Couperin, Rameau was a master of the 18th-century French school of harpsichord music, and both made a break with the style of the first generation of harpsichordists whose compositions adhered to the relatively standardised suite form, which had reached its apogee in the first decade of the 18th century and successive collections of pieces by Louis Marchand, Gaspard Le Roux, Louis-Nicolas Clérambault, Jean-François Dandrieu, Élisabeth Jacquet de la Guerre, Charles Dieupart and Nicolas Siret. Rameau and Couperin had different styles, and it seems they did not know one another: Couperin was one of the official court musicians; Rameau, fifteen years his junior, achieved fame only after Couperin's death.

Rameau published his first book of harpsichord pieces in 1706. (Cf. Couperin, who waited until 1713 before publishing his first "Ordres".) Rameau's music includes pieces in the pure tradition of the French suite: imitative ("Le rappel des oiseaux", "La poule") and characterful ("Les tendres plaintes", "L'entretien des Muses"). But there are also works of pure virtuosity that resemble Domenico Scarlatti ("Les tourbillons", "Les trois mains") as well as pieces that reveal the experiments of a theorist and musical innovator ("L'enharmonique", "Les Cyclopes"), which had a marked influence on Louis-Claude Daquin, Joseph-Nicolas-Pancrace Royer and Jacques Duphly. Rameau's suites are grouped in the traditional way, by key. The first set of dances (Allemande, Courante, Sarabande, Les Trois Mains, Fanfairenette, La Triomphante, Gavotte et 6 doubles) is centred on A major and A minor, while the remaining pieces (Les tricoteuses, L'Indifferente, Première Menuet, Deuxième Menuet, La Poule, Les Triolets, Les Sauvages, L'Enharmonique, L'Egiptienne [sic]) are centred around G major and G minor.

Rameau's second and third collections appeared in 1724 and 1727. After these he composed only one piece for the harpsichord, the eight-minute "La Dauphine" of 1747, while the very short "Les petits marteaux" (c. 1750) has also been attributed to him.

During his semiretirement (1740 to 1744) he wrote the Pièces de clavecin en concerts (1741), which some musicologists consider the pinnacle of French Baroque chamber music. Adopting a formula successfully employed by Mondonville a few years earlier, Rameau fashioned these pieces differently from trio sonatas in that the harpsichord is not simply there as basso continuo to accompany melody instruments (violin, flute, viol) but as equal partner in "concert" with them. Rameau claimed that this music would be equally satisfying played on the harpsichord alone, but the claim is not wholly convincing because he took the trouble to transcribe five of them himself, those the lack of other instruments would show the least.

==== Opera ====
After 1733 Rameau dedicated himself mostly to opera. On a strictly musical level, 18th-century French Baroque opera is richer and more varied than contemporary Italian opera, especially in the place given to choruses and dances but also in the musical continuity that arises from the respective relationships between the arias and the recitatives. Another essential difference: whereas Italian opera gave a starring role to female sopranos and castrati, French opera had no use for the latter. The Italian opera of Rameau's day (opera seria, opera buffa) was essentially divided into musical sections (da capo arias, duets, trios, etc.) and sections that were spoken or almost spoken (recitativo secco). It was during the latter that the action progressed while the audience waited for the next aria; on the other hand, the text of the arias was almost entirely buried beneath music whose chief aim was to show off the virtuosity of the singer. Nothing of the kind is to be found in French opera of the day; since Lully, the text had to remain comprehensible—limiting certain techniques such as the vocalise, which was reserved for special words such as gloire ("glory") or victoire ("victory"). A subtle equilibrium existed between the more and the less musical parts: melodic recitative on the one hand and arias that were often closer to arioso on the other, alongside virtuoso "ariettes" in the Italian style. This form of continuous music prefigures Wagnerian drama even more than does the "reform" opera of Gluck.

Five essential components may be discerned in Rameau's operatic scores:

- Pieces of "pure" music (overtures, ritornelli, music which closes scenes). Unlike the highly stereotyped Lullian overture, Rameau's overtures show an extraordinary variety. Even in his earliest works, where he uses the standard French model, Rameau—the born symphonist and master of orchestration—composes novel and unique pieces. A few pieces are particularly striking, such as the overture to Zaïs, depicting the chaos before the creation of the universe, that of Pigmalion, suggesting the sculptor's chipping away at the statue with his mallet, or many more conventional depictions of storms and earthquakes, as well perhaps as the imposing final chaconnes of Les Indes galantes or Dardanus.
- Dance music: the danced interludes, which were obligatory even in tragédie en musique, allowed Rameau to give free rein to his inimitable sense of rhythm, melody, and choreography, acknowledged by all his contemporaries, including the dancers themselves. This "learned" composer, forever preoccupied by his next theoretical work, also was one who strung together gavottes, minuets, loures, rigaudons, passepieds, tambourins, and musettes by the dozen. According to his biographer, Cuthbert Girdlestone, "The immense superiority of all that pertains to Rameau in choreography still needs emphasizing", and the German scholar Hermann Wolfgang von Waltershausen affirmed:

Rameau was the greatest ballet composer of all times. The genius of his creation rests on one hand on his perfect artistic permeation by folk-dance types, on the other hand on the constant preservation of living contact with the practical requirements of the ballet stage, which prevented an estrangement between the expression of the body from the spirit of absolute music.

- Choruses: Padre Martini, the erudite musicologist who corresponded with Rameau, affirmed that "the French are excellent at choruses", obviously thinking of Rameau himself. A great master of harmony, Rameau knew how to compose sumptuous choruses—whether monodic, polyphonic, or interspersed with passages for solo singers or the orchestra—and whatever feelings needed to be expressed.
- Arias: less frequent than in Italian opera, Rameau nevertheless offers many striking examples. Particularly admired arias include Télaïre's "Tristes apprêts" from Castor et Pollux; "Ô jour affreux" and "Lieux funestes" from Dardanus; Huascar's invocations in Les Indes galantes; and the final ariette in Pigmalion. In Platée we encounter a showstopping ars poetica aria for the character of La Folie (the madness), "Formons les plus brillants concerts / Aux langeurs d'Apollon".
- Recitative: much closer to arioso than to recitativo secco. The composer took scrupulous care to observe French prosody and used his harmonic knowledge to give expression to his protagonists' feelings.

During the first part of his operatic career (1733–1739), Rameau wrote his great masterpieces destined for the Académie royale de musique: three tragédies en musique and two opéra-ballets that still form the core of his repertoire. After the interval of 1740 to 1744, he became the official court musician, and for the most part, composed pieces intended to entertain, with plenty of dance music emphasising sensuality and an idealised pastoral atmosphere. In his last years, Rameau returned to a renewed version of his early style in Les Paladins and Les Boréades.

His Zoroastre was first performed in 1749. According to one of Rameau's admirers, Cuthbert Girdlestone, this opera has a distinctive place in his works: "The profane passions of hatred and jealousy are rendered more intensely [than in his other works] and with a strong sense of reality."

===== Rameau and his librettists =====
Unlike Lully, who collaborated with Philippe Quinault on almost all his operas, Rameau rarely worked with the same librettist twice. He was highly demanding and bad-tempered, unable to maintain longstanding partnerships with his librettists, with the exception of Louis de Cahusac, who collaborated with him on several operas, including Les fêtes de l'Hymen et de l'Amour (1747), Zaïs (1748), Naïs (1749), Zoroastre (1749; revised 1756), La naissance d'Osiris (1754), and Anacréon (the first of Rameau's operas by that name, 1754). He is also credited with writing the libretto of Rameau's final work, Les Boréades (c. 1763).

Many Rameau specialists have regretted that the collaboration with Houdar de la Motte never took place, and that the Samson project with Voltaire came to nothing because the librettists Rameau did work with were second-rate. He made his acquaintance of most of them at La Poupelinière's salon, at the Société du Caveau, or at the house of the comte de Livry, all meeting places for leading cultural figures of the day.

Not one of his librettists managed to produce a libretto on the same artistic level as Rameau's music: the plots were often overly complex or unconvincing. But this was standard for the genre, and is probably part of its charm. The versification, too, was mediocre, and Rameau often had to have the libretto modified and rewrite the music after the premiere because of the ensuing criticism. This is why we have two versions of Castor et Pollux (1737 and 1754) and three of Dardanus (1739, 1744, and 1760).

=== Reputation and influence ===
By the end of his life, Rameau's music had come under attack in France from theorists who favoured Italian models. However, foreign composers working in the Italian tradition were increasingly looking towards Rameau as a way of reforming their own leading operatic genre, opera seria. Tommaso Traetta produced two operas setting translations of Rameau libretti that show the French composer's influence, Ippolito ed Aricia (1759) and I Tintaridi (based on Castor et Pollux, 1760). Traetta had been advised by Count Francesco Algarotti, a leading proponent of reform according to French models; Algarotti was a major influence on the most important "reformist" composer, Christoph Willibald Gluck. Gluck's three Italian reform operas of the 1760s—Orfeo ed Euridice, Alceste, and Paride ed Elena—reveal a knowledge of Rameau's works. For instance, both Orfeo and the 1737 version of Castor et Pollux open with the funeral of one of the leading characters who later comes back to life. Many of the operatic reforms advocated in the preface to Gluck's Alceste were already present in Rameau's works. Rameau had used accompanied recitatives, and the overtures in his later operas reflected the action to come, so when Gluck arrived in Paris in 1774 to produce a series of six French operas, he could be seen as continuing in the tradition of Rameau. Nevertheless, while Gluck's popularity survived the French Revolution, Rameau's did not. By the end of the 18th century, his operas had vanished from the repertoire.

For most of the 19th century, Rameau's music remained unplayed, known only by reputation. Hector Berlioz investigated Castor et Pollux and particularly admired the aria "Tristes apprêts", but "whereas the modern listener readily perceives the common ground with Berlioz' music, he himself was more conscious of the gap which separated them." French humiliation in the Franco-Prussian War brought about a change in Rameau's fortunes. As Rameau biographer Jean Malignon wrote, "...the German victory over France in 1870–71 was the grand occasion for digging up great heroes from the French past. Rameau, like so many others, was flung into the enemy's face to bolster our courage and our faith in the national destiny of France." In 1894, composer Vincent d'Indy founded the Schola Cantorum to promote French national music; the society put on several revivals of works by Rameau. Among the audience was Claude Debussy, who especially cherished Castor et Pollux, revived in 1903: "Gluck's genius was deeply rooted in Rameau's works... a detailed comparison allows us to affirm that Gluck could replace Rameau on the French stage only by assimilating the latter's beautiful works and making them his own." Camille Saint-Saëns (by editing and publishing the Pièces in 1895) and Paul Dukas were two other important French musicians who gave practical championship to Rameau's music in their day, but interest in Rameau petered out again, and it was not until the late 20th century that a serious effort was made to revive his works. Over half of Rameau's operas have now been recorded, in particular by conductors such as John Eliot Gardiner, William Christie, and Marc Minkowski.

One of his pieces is commonly heard in the Victoria Centre in Nottingham by the Rowland Emett timepiece, the Aqua Horological Tintinnabulator. Emett quoted that Rameau made music for his school and the shopping centre without him knowing it.

== Theoretical works ==
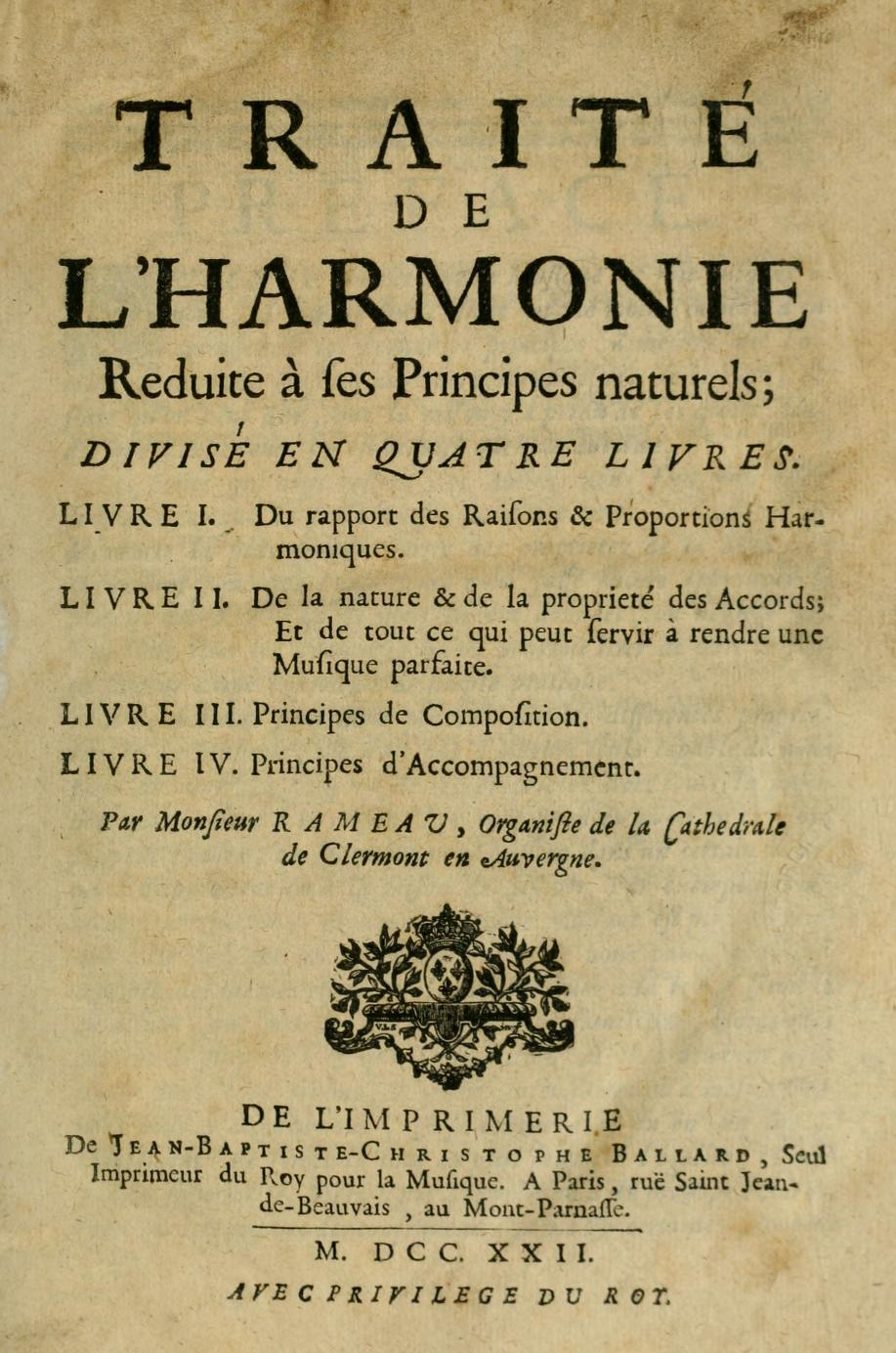
Title page of the Treatise on Harmony

=== Treatise on Harmony, 1722 ===
Rameau's 1722 Treatise on Harmony initiated a revolution in music theory. Rameau introduced the concept of a hypothetical "fundamental bass" (separate from any actual bass part) that can be used to analyze and explain the harmonic progressions found in a musical piece. Heavily influenced by new Cartesian modes of thought and analysis, Rameau's methodology incorporated mathematics, commentary, analysis and a didacticism that was specifically intended to illuminate, scientifically, the structure and principles of music. With careful deductive reasoning, he attempted to derive universal harmonic principles from natural causes. Previous treatises on harmony had been purely practical; Rameau embraced the new philosophical rationalism, quickly rising to prominence in France as the "Isaac Newton of Music". His fame subsequently spread throughout all Europe, and his Treatise became the definitive authority on music theory, forming the foundation for instruction in western music that persists to this day.

=== New System of Musical Theory, 1726 ===
(French: Nouveau système de musique théorique) is Rameau's second treatise on musical theory.

=== Génération harmonique: ou Traité de musique théorique et pratique, 1737 ===
Rameau published his third music-theory work in 1737.

=== More Theoretical Works ===
See a longer (but non-hyperlinked) list including minor works, translations, errata, and letters at Rameau le site.

== Musical works ==
Troisième livre de pièces de clavecin de Rameau – Suite in A minor (1728, RCT 5)
Gavotte and Variations

Variation 1

Variations 2

Variation 3

Variation 4

Variation 5

Variation 6
Performed by Martha Goldstein

RCT numbering refers to Rameau Catalogue Thématique established by Sylvie Bouissou and Denis Herlin.

=== Instrumental works ===
- Pièces de Clavecin. Trois livres. Pieces for harpsichord, 3 books, published 1706, 1724, 1726/27(?)
  - RCT 1 – Premier livre de Clavecin (1706)
  - RCT 2 – Pièces de clavecin (1724) – Suite in E minor
  - RCT 3 – Pièces de clavecin (1724) – Suite in D major
  - RCT 4 – Pièces de clavecin (1724) – Menuet in C major
  - RCT 5 – Nouvelles suites de pièces de clavecin (1726/27) – Suite in A minor
  - RCT 6 – Nouvelles suites de pièces de clavecin (1726/27) – Suite in G
- Pièces de clavecin en concerts, five albums of character pieces for harpsichord, violin and viol. (1741)
  - RCT 7 – Concert I in C minor
  - RCT 8 – Concert II in G major
  - RCT 9 – Concert III in A major
  - RCT 10 – Concert IV in B-flat major
  - RCT 11 – Concert V in D minor
- RCT 12 – La Dauphine for harpsichord. (1747)
- RCT 12bis – Les petits marteaux for harpsichord.
- Several orchestral dance suites extracted from his operas.

=== Motets ===
- RCT 13 – Deus noster refugium (c. 1713–1715)
- RCT 14 – In convertendo (probably before 1720, rev. 1751)
- RCT 15 – Quam dilecta (c. 1713–1715)
- RCT 16 – Laboravi (published in the Traité de l'harmonie, 1722)

=== Canons ===
- RCT 17 – Ah! loin de rire, pleurons (soprano, alto, tenor, bass) (pub. 1722)
- RCT 18 – Avec du vin, endormons-nous (2 sopranos, Tenor) (1719)
- RCT 18bis – L'épouse entre deux draps (3 sopranos) (formerly attributed to François Couperin)
- RCT 18ter – Je suis un fou Madame (3 voix égales) (1720)
- RCT 19 – Mes chers amis, quittez vos rouges bords (3 sopranos, 3 basses) (pub. 1780)
- RCT 20 – Réveillez-vous, dormeur sans fin (5 voix égales) (pub. 1722)
- RCT 20bis – Si tu ne prends garde à toi (2 sopranos, bass) (1720)

=== Songs ===
- RCT 21.1 – L'amante préoccupée or A l'objet que j'adore (soprano, continuo) (1763)
- RCT 21.2 – Lucas, pour se gausser de nous (soprano, bass, continuo) (pub. 1707)
- RCT 21.3 – Non, non, le dieu qui sait aimer (soprano, continuo) (1763)
- RCT 21.4 – Un Bourbon ouvre sa carrière or Un héros ouvre sa carrière (alto, continuo) (1751, air belonging to Acante et Céphise but censored before its first performance and never reintroduced in the work).

=== Cantatas ===
- RCT 23 – Aquilon et Orithie (between 1715 and 1720)
- RCT 28 – Thétis (same period)
- RCT 26 – L'impatience (same period)
- RCT 22 – Les amants trahis (around 1720)
- RCT 27 – Orphée (same period)
- RCT 24 – Le berger fidèle (1728)
- RCT 25 – Cantate pour le jour de la Saint Louis (1740)

=== Operas and stage works ===
==== Tragédies en musique ====
- RCT 43 – Hippolyte et Aricie (1733; revised 1742 and 1757)
- RCT 32 – Castor et Pollux (1737; revised 1754)
- RCT 35 – Dardanus (1739; revised 1744 and 1760)
- RCT 62 – Zoroastre (1749; revised 1756, with new music for Acts II, III & V)
- RCT 31 – Les Boréades or Abaris (unperformed; in rehearsal 1763)

==== Opéra-ballets ====
- RCT 44 – Les Indes galantes (1735; revised 1736)
- RCT 41 – Les fêtes d'Hébé or les Talens Lyriques (1739)
- RCT 39 – Les fêtes de Polymnie (1745)
- RCT 59 – Le temple de la gloire (1745; revised 1746)
- RCT 38 – Les fêtes de l'Hymen et de l'Amour or Les Dieux d'Egypte (1747)
- RCT 58 – Les surprises de l'Amour (1748; revised 1757)

==== Pastorales héroïques ====
- RCT 60 – Zaïs (1748)
- RCT 49 – Naïs (1749)
- RCT 29 – Acante et Céphise or La sympathie (1751)
- RCT 34 – Daphnis et Eglé (1753)

==== Comédies lyriques ====
- RCT 53 – Platée or Junon jalouse (1745)
- RCT 51 – Les Paladins or Le Vénitien (1760)

==== Comédie-ballet ====
- RCT 54 – La princesse de Navarre (1744)

==== Actes de ballet ====
- RCT 33 – Les courses de Tempé (1734)
- RCT 40 – Les fêtes de Ramire (1745)
- RCT 52 – Pigmalion (1748)
- RCT 42 – La guirlande or Les fleurs enchantées (1751)
- RCT 57 – Les sibarites or Sibaris (1753)
- RCT 48 – La naissance d'Osiris or La Fête Pamilie (1754)
- RCT 30 – Anacréon (1754)
- RCT 58 – Anacréon (completely different work from the above, 1757, 3rd Entrée of Les surprises de l'Amour)
- RCT 61 – Zéphire (date unknown)
- RCT 50 – Nélée et Myrthis (date unknown)
- RCT 45 – Io (unfinished, date unknown)

==== Lost works ====
- RCT 56 – Samson (tragédie en musique) (first version written 1733–1734; second version 1736; neither was ever staged )
- RCT 46 – Linus (tragédie en musique) (1751, score stolen after a rehearsal)
- RCT 47 – Lisis et Délie (pastorale) (scheduled on November 6, 1753)

==== Incidental music for opéras comiques ====
Music mostly lost.

- RCT 36 – L'endriague (in 3 acts, 1723)
- RCT 37 – L'enrôlement d'Arlequin (in 1 act, 1726)
- RCT 55 – La robe de dissension or Le faux prodige (in 2 acts, 1726)
- RCT 55bis – La rose or Les jardins de l'Hymen (in a prologue and 1 act, 1744)

=== Writings ===
- Traité de l'harmonie réduite à ses principes naturels (Paris, 1722)
- Nouveau système de musique théorique (Paris, 1726)
- Dissertation sur les différents méthodes d'accompagnement pour le clavecin, ou pour l'orgue (Paris, 1732)
- Génération harmonique, ou Traité de musique théorique et pratique (Paris, 1737)
- Mémoire où l'on expose les fondemens du Système de musique théorique et pratique de M. Rameau (1749)
- Démonstration du principe de l'harmonie (Paris, 1750)
- Nouvelles réflexions de M. Rameau sur sa 'Démonstration du principe de l'harmonie' (Paris, 1752)
- Observations sur notre instinct pour la musique (Paris, 1754)
- Erreurs sur la musique dans l'Encyclopédie (Paris, 1755)
- Suite des erreurs sur la musique dans l'Encyclopédie (Paris, 1756)
- Réponse de M. Rameau à MM. les éditeurs de l'Encyclopédie sur leur dernier Avertissement (Paris, 1757)
- Nouvelles réflexions sur le principe sonore (1758–59)
- Code de musique pratique, ou Méthodes pour apprendre la musique...avec des nouvelles réflexions sur le principe sonore (Paris, 1760)
- Lettre à M. Alembert sur ses opinions en musique (Paris, 1760)
- Origine des sciences, suivie d'un controverse sur le même sujet (Paris, 1762)
