= Pierre Jélyotte =

French opera singer

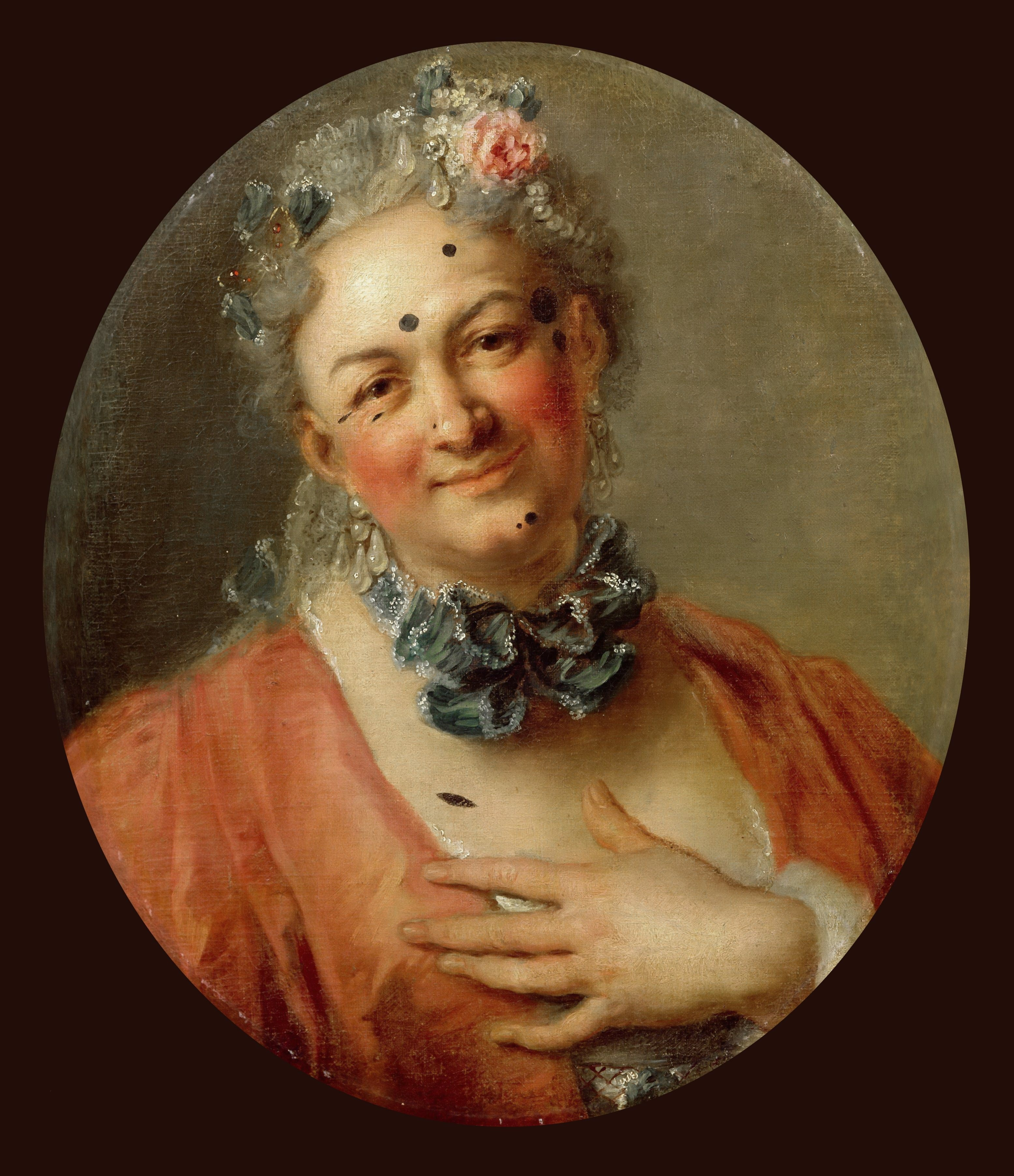
Pierre Jélyotte in the Role of the Nymph Plataea in Jean-Philippe Rameau's Comic Opera Platée ou Junon jalouse by Charles Antoine Coypel (c. 1745) Paris, Musée du Louvre

Pierre Jélyotte (13 April 1713 – 11 September 1797) was a French operatic tenor, particularly associated with works by Rameau, Lully, Campra, Mondonville and Destouches.

== Life and career ==
Born Pierre Grichon in Lasseube, he studied in Toulouse (voice, harpsichord, guitar, violin, composition) and made his stage debut in Paris as a singer at the Concert Spirituel in 1733.

That same year, he made his debut at the Opéra de Paris, in Les fêtes grecques et romaines, by François Colin de Blamont. He thereafter created several roles in opera by Jean-Philippe Rameau, such as; Hippolyte et Aricie, Les Indes galantes, Dardanus, and Zoroastre, as well as in opera by Jean-Baptiste Lully, André Campra, and André Cardinal Destouches. In all he sang some 150 roles.

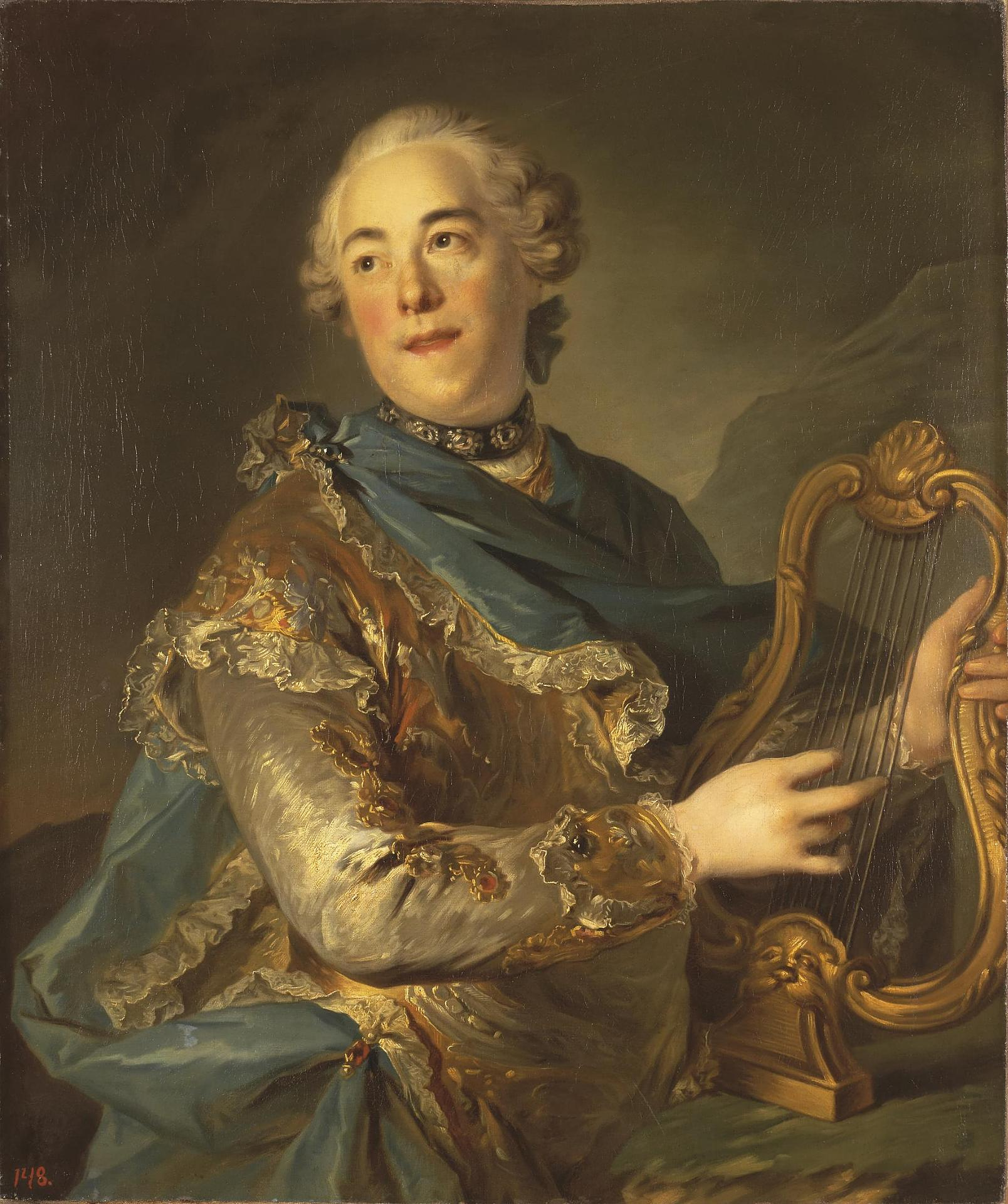
Louis Tocqué, 1755, Portrait de Pierre de Jélyotte (Portrait of Actor as Apollo), oil on canvas, 82 × 72 cm (32.3 × 28.3 in), Hermitage Museum

He often appeared at Court in Fontainebleau, where he sang Daphnis in Daphnis et Alcimadure by Jean-Joseph de Mondonville, and Colin in Le devin du village by Jean-Jacques Rousseau.

In 1755, he retired from the Opéra, singing in Castor et Pollux, but continued singing at court until 1765. He then joined the "Orchestre du Roi" (the King's Orchestra) as a violinist and guitarist, and later joined the private orchestra of Madame de Pompadour as a cellist, and wrote a few "comédies-ballets", notably Zeliska. He died, aged 84, in Oloron.

Widely regarded as the "greatest singer of Europe" in his time, his voice type was then known as haute-contre, his voice was by all account powerful, and in some ways prefigured a new vocal type closer to the tenor as we know it today, opening the doors to a new style of singing, as Adolphe Nourrit and Gilbert Duprez would soon demonstrate.

== Sources ==
- Le guide de l'opéra, les indispensables de la musique, R. Mancini & J-J. Rouvereux, (Fayard, 1986), ISBN 2-213-01563-5
