= Marie Fel =

French opera singer (1713–1794)

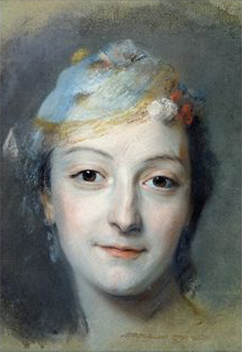
Marie Fel Portrait by Quentin de La Tour (1757)

Marie Fel (24 October 1713 – 2 February 1794) was a French opera singer and a daughter of the organist Henri Fel.

Marie Fel was born at Bordeaux. She made her debut at the Paris Opera in 1733 and sang regularly at the Concert Spirituel. In a career that lasted 35 years, she sang in all the operas of Rameau along with Pierre Jélyotte, created roles in those of Mondonville, and participated in revivals of those of Lully and Campra. She retired from the stage in 1758, but continued to perform in concert until 1769. She died in Paris.

She had a long-term relationship with the painter Quentin de La Tour, who painted her portrait. "The greatest personalities of her age sought her good graces and gave her lively proofs of their affections," including men of letters such as the Baron von Grimm and the Encyclopédiste Louis de Cahusac. The French actress and singer Sophie Arnould was one of her students.
