= Opéra-ballet =

Genre of French Baroque lyric theatre

Opéra-ballet (French: [ɔ.pe.ʁa.ba.lɛ]; plural: opéras-ballets) is a genre of French Baroque lyric theatre that was most popular during the 18th century, combining elements of opera and ballet, "that grew out of the ballets à entrées of the early seventeenth century". It differed from the more elevated tragédie en musique as practised by Jean-Baptiste Lully in several ways. It contained more dance music than the tragédie, and the plots were not necessarily derived from classical mythology and allowed for the comic elements, which Lully had excluded from the tragédie en musique after Thésée (1675). The opéra-ballet consisted of a prologue followed by a number of self-contained acts (also known as entrées), often loosely grouped around a single theme. The individual acts could also be performed independently, in which case they were known as actes de ballet.

== History ==
The first work in the genre is generally held to be André Campra's L'Europe galante ("Europe in Love") of 1697, but Les Saisons of 1695 is often mentioned as the most distinctive prototype of this sort of composition and is only not considered an opéra-ballet due to its use of mythological characters. Famous later examples are Les élémens (1721) by Destouches, Les Indes galantes (1735), and Les fêtes d'Hébé (1739) by Jean-Philippe Rameau.
