= Cuthbert Girdlestone =

British musicologist (1895–1975)

Cuthbert Morton Girdlestone (17 September 1895 – 10 December 1975) was a British musicologist and literary scholar.

Born in Bovey Tracey, Devon, Girdlestone was educated at Southey Hall, Worthing, and the Lycée de Pau; at the Sorbonne, where he was awarded a Licencié-ès-lettres (LèsL) in 1915; and finally at Trinity College, Cambridge, where he was a senior scholar in 1920 and completed the modern and medieval languages tripos the following year (one of only three to do so with a starred first, the other two being the brothers Sergey and Vladimir Nabokov).

Thereafter, Girdlestone was a Fellow at Trinity for several years before taking up the chair in French at Armstrong College (later to be King's College in Newcastle) in 1926, a position he held until 1960. His most famous publications are his much-reprinted study of the Mozart Piano Concertos (1939, published originally in French) and his biography of Jean-Philippe Rameau (1957).

== Books ==
- Girdlestone, Cuthbert. Mozart et ses concertos pour piano. Paris, Fischbacher. 1939.
  - Girdlestone, Cuthbert. Mozart and His Piano Concertos. New York: Dover Publications, 1964. "An unabridged and corrected republication of the second (1958) edition of the work first published in 1948 by Cassell & Company, Ltd., London, under the title Mozart’s Piano Concertos." A translation of Mozart et ses concertos pour piano. ISBN 0-486-21271-8 (pbk.) (3rd edition published London: Cassell, 1978. ISBN 0-304-30043-8.)
- Girdlestone, Cuthbert. Jean-Philippe Rameau, His Life and Work. London: Cassell. 1957. (2nd Edition: Paris: Lettres modernes, 1968, and in English: New York: Dover Publications, 1969. ISBN 0-486-21416-8.)
  - Girdlestone, Cuthbert. Jean-Philippe Rameau: sa vie, son œuvre. Desclée de Brouwer, 1983, ©1962. ISBN 2-220-02439-3.
- Girdlestone, Cuthbert. La tragédie en musique, considéré comme genre littéraire. Droz, Geneva. 1972. OCoLC 772775.
