= Haute-contre =

Voice type in French opera

The haute-contre (plural hautes-contre) was the primary French operatic tenor voice, predominant in French Baroque and Classical opera, from the middle of the seventeenth century until the latter part of the eighteenth century.

== History ==
This voice was predominantly used in male solo roles, typically heroic and amatory ones, but also in comic parts, even en travesti (see apropos the portrait reproduced below and representing Pierre Jélyotte made up for the female title role of Rameau's Platée). Lully wrote 8 out of 14 leading male roles for the voice; Charpentier, who was an haute-contre himself, composed extensively for the voice-part, as did Rameau and, later, Gluck.

The leading hautes-contre of the Académie Royale de Musique that created the main roles of Lully's operas, at the end of the seventeenth century, were Bernard Clédière (who started off as a taille, a lower Tenor voice type) and Louis Gaulard Dumesny. Notable hautes-contre of the eighteenth century's first half included firstly Jacques Cochereau, Louis/Claude Murayre and Denis-François Tribou, who revived Lully style and operas in the twenties and in the thirties, then the mentioned Pierre Jélyotte and his substitutes, François Poirier and Jean-Paul Spesoller de Latour, all of whom sang Rameau's operas and Lully's revivals for the Académie Royale de Musique, and finally Marc-François Bêche, who was engaged mainly in performances at court. After these came Joseph Legros, for whom Gluck wrote his main haute-contre roles, which included the title role in the 1774 version of Orphée et Eurydice, and Achilles in Iphigénie en Aulide. There is also an extensive repertoire of music for this voice in French airs de cour and in French solo cantatas of the Baroque period; hautes-contre sang in choirs as well, taking the part above the taille.

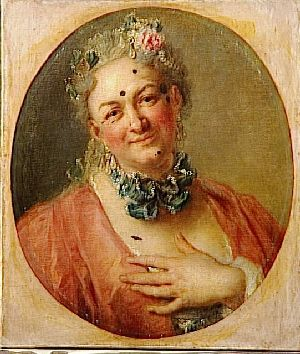
Jélyotte in the title-role of Rameau's Platée, by Charles-Antoine Coypel c.1745

== Vocal features ==
The nature of the haute-contre voice has been the subject of much debate. Historically, English writers have translated the term as "countertenor" which is not particularly helpful since the meaning of that latter term has also been the subject of considerable musicological controversy; both terms are ultimately derived from the Latin contratenor (see countertenor). It is now generally accepted that the hautes-contre sang in what voice scientists term "modal" (i.e. "speaking" voice), perhaps using falsetto for their highest notes. A typical solo range for this voice was C_{3} to D_{5} considering that French eighteenth-century pitch was as much as a whole tone lower than that of today. Though this high-pitched range might lead one to think of the haute-contre as a light voice, historical evidence does not bear this out: Jélyotte was much praised for the strength of his high register, the astronomer and traveller Joseph Jérôme Lefrançois de Lalande commenting that "one takes more pleasure in hearing a large voice than a small one." Lalande stated that Jélyotte's range was identical to that of the famous tenor Angelo Amorevoli. He also remarked that "all those who succeeded Legros had to shout to arrive at the tones of an haute-contre, except for Rousseau, but he had the smallest sound."

The haute-contre is regarded by some authorities as similar to, or indeed identical with, the voice-type described in Italian as tenore contraltino. Although not unknown at an earlier date (for example the title-role in Mozart's Mitridate), roles for this voice were particularly numerous at the beginning of the nineteenth century: for example Lindoro in Rossini's L'italiana in Algeri or Rodrigo in Otello. Rossini also wrote roles in French for this type of voice, which may thus be regarded as a direct continuation of the earlier haute-contre tradition. These include the protagonist of Le Comte Ory, Néocles in Le siège de Corinthe and Arnold in Guillaume Tell, all of which were written for the great French tenor Adolphe Nourrit.

== Modern performances ==
Recently, with a revival of interest in and the performance of French baroque repertoire, several high tenors have come to prominence in haute-contre repertoire. These include Mark Padmore, Anders J. Dahlin, Rogers Covey-Crump, Jean-Paul Fouchécourt, Paul Agnew and Cyril Auvity. None of these sing the French Baroque repertoire to the exclusion of all others, and all are involved, to a greater or lesser extent, in the performance of mainstream tenor repertoire.

== Repertoire ==
See List of French haute-contre roles
