= Jacques Aved =

French painter (1702–1766)

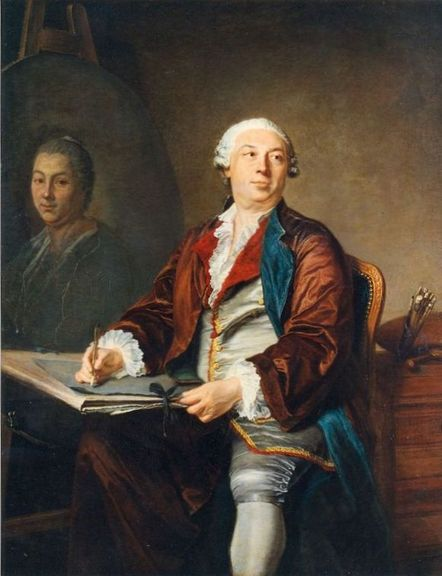
Self-portrait, c. 1752

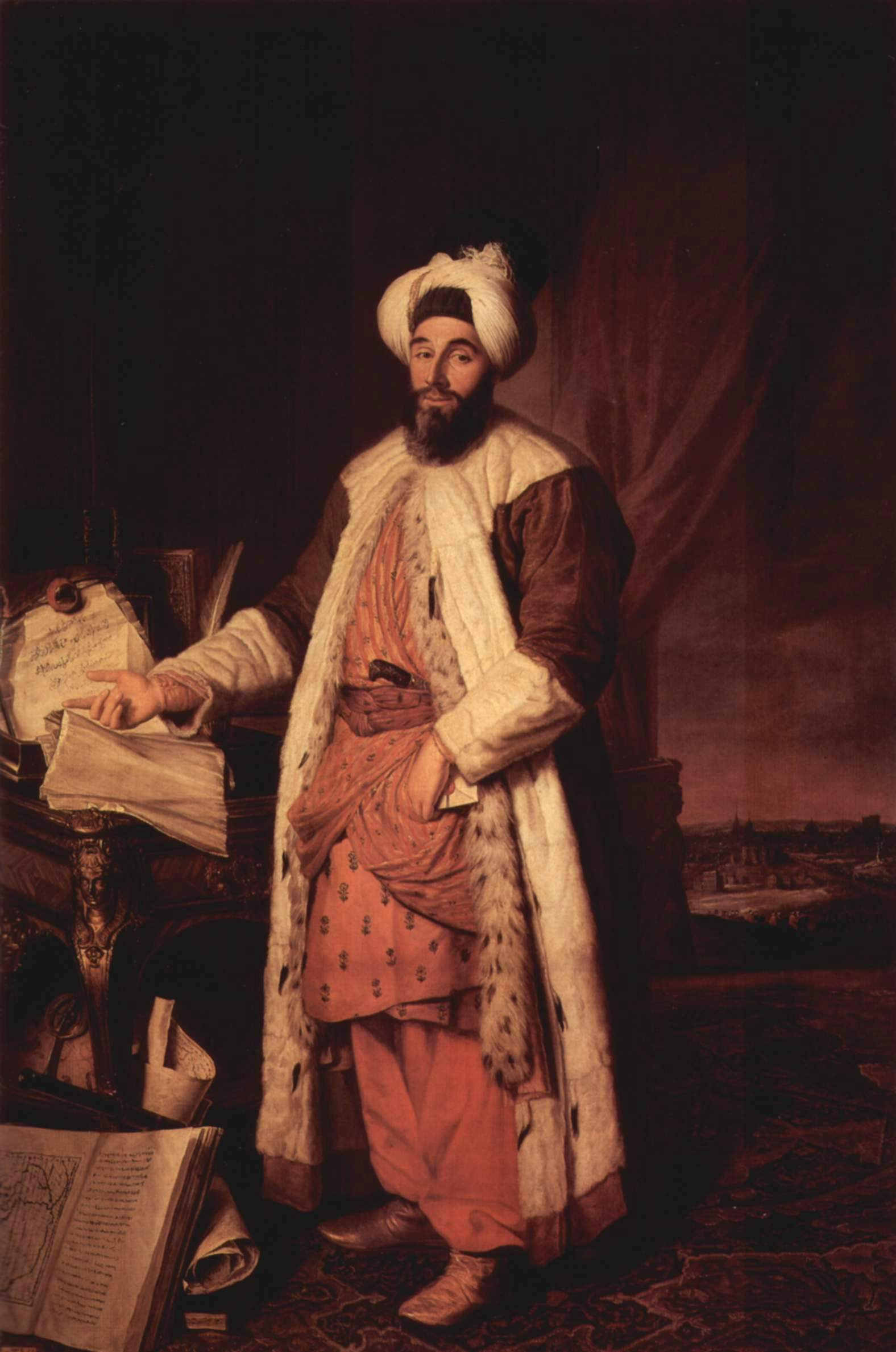
Yirmisekizzade Mehmed Said Efendi, 1742, Louvre Abu Dhabi

Jacques-André-Joseph Aved (12 January 1702 – 4 March 1766), also called le Camelot (lit. 'The Hawker') and Avet le Batave (lit. 'The Dutch Avet'), was a French painter, renowned among the main Rococo portraitists in Paris during King Louis XV's reign. He painted among others the Ottoman Empire ambassador to France in 1742, Yirmisekizzade Mehmed Said Efendi.

His father was a physician and he was orphaned when he was a little boy. He was raised in Amsterdam by one of his uncles, who was a captain in the Dutch Army.

After his training in Amsterdam with François Boitard and Bernard Picart, Jacques Aved started working in Paris for Belle in 1721. He later entered the Académie royale de peinture et de sculpture (Royal Academy of Painting and Sculpture) in 1731 and he was appointed councillor after graduating in 1734 and in 1759, he took part in his last salon. In 1753 he became a member of the Confrerie Pictura.

As an art dealer and collector, he owned one of the most important collections with works by Italian, French and especially Dutch artists. This collection was sold at auction in 1766.

Carle Van Loo, François Boucher, Dumont le Romain and Chardin were some of his pupils.
