= List of operas by Jean-Philippe Rameau =

This is a complete list of operas by Jean-Philippe Rameau (1683–1764).

RCT	Title	Genre	Subdivisions	Libretto	Première date	Place, theatre
43	Hippolyte et Aricie	tragédie en musique	prologue and 5 acts	Abbé Simon-Joseph Pellegrin	1 October 1733, revised version: 11 September 1742	Paris, Opéra, Palais-Royal (both occasions)
56	Samson	tragédie en musique	prologue and 5 acts	Voltaire	unperformed, lost, rehearsed 1734	
44	Les Indes galantes	opéra-ballet	prologue and 4 entrées (Le Turc généreux, Les Incas du Pérou, Les fleurs, Les sauvages) (originally just the first two)	Louis Fuzelier	23 August 1735, revised version: 10 March 1736	Paris, Opéra, Palais-Royal (both occasions)
32	Castor et Pollux	tragédie en musique	prologue and 5 acts	Pierre-Joseph-Justin Bernard	24 October 1737	Paris, Opéra, Palais-Royal
41	Les fêtes d'Hébé, ou Les talents lyriques	opéra-ballet	prologue and 3 entrées (La poésie, La musique, La danse)	Antoine Gautier de Montdorge	21 May 1739	Paris, Opéra, Palais-Royal
35	Dardanus	tragédie en musique	prologue and 5 acts	Charles-Antoine Le Clerc de La Bruère	19 November 1739	Paris, Opéra, Palais-Royal
54	La princesse de Navarre	comédie-ballet	3 acts	Voltaire	23 February 1745	Versailles, Théâtre du château
53	Platée or Junon jalouse	comédie lyrique	prologue and 3 acts	Jacques Autreau, revised by Adrien-Joseph Le Valois d'Orville	31 March 1745	Versailles, Théâtre du château
39	Les fêtes de Polymnie	opéra-ballet	prologue (Le temple de Mémoire) and 3 entrées (La fable, L'histoire, La féérie)	Louis de Cahusac	12 October 1745	Paris, Opéra, Palais-Royal
59	Le temple de la gloire	opéra-ballet	5 acts (originally), prologue and 3 acts (Bélus et Erigone, Bacchus, Trajan)	Voltaire	27 November 1745, revised version: 19 April 1746	Versailles, Théâtre du château; revised version: Paris, Opéra, Palais-Royal
40	Les fêtes de Ramire; reworking of: La princesse de Navarre	acte de ballet	1 act	Voltaire	22 December 1745	Versailles, Théâtre du château
38	Les fêtes de l'Hymen et de l'Amour, ou Les dieux d'Égypte	opéra-ballet	prologue and 3 entrées (Osiris, Canope, Aruéris ou Les Isies)	Louis de Cahusac	15 March 1747	Paris, Opéra, Palais-Royal
60	Zaïs	pastorale héroïque	prologue and 4 acts	Louis de Cahusac	29 February 1748	Paris, Opéra, Palais-Royal
52	Pigmalion	acte de ballet	1 act	Ballot de Sauvot, after Antoine Houdar de la Motte's Le triomphe des arts	27 August 1748	Paris, Opéra, Palais-Royal
58	Les surprises de l'Amour	opéra-ballet	prologue (Le retour d'Astrée) and 2 entrées (La lyre enchantée, Adonis, or, in the 1757 revision, L'enlévement d'Adonis)	Pierre-Joseph-Justin Bernard	27 November 1748, revised 31 May 1757 and 10 October 1758	Versailles (1748), Paris, Opéra, Palais-Royal (1757, 1758)
49	Naïs	pastorale héroïque	prologue and 3 acts	Louis de Cahusac	22 April 1749	Paris, Opéra, Palais-Royal
62	Zoroastre	tragédie en musique	5 acts	Louis de Cahusac	5 December 1749	Paris, Opéra, Palais-Royal
29	Acante et Céphise, ou La sympathie	pastorale héroïque	3 acts	Jean-François Marmontel	18 November 1751	Paris, Opéra, Palais-Royal
46	Linus	tragédie en musique	5 acts	Charles-Antoine Leclerc de La Bruère	in rehearsal ca. 1752 but unperformed, lost	
42	La guirlande, ou Les fleurs enchantées	acte de ballet	1 act	Jean-François Marmontel	21 September 1751	Paris, Opéra, Palais-Royal
34	Daphnis et Eglé	pastorale héroïque	1 act	Charles Collé	30 October 1753	Fontainebleau, Théâtre du château
47	Lisis et Délie	pastorale	1 act	Jean-François Marmontel	scheduled for 6 November 1753 but not performed, lost	
57	Les Sibarites (original title: Sibaris)	acte de ballet	1 act	Jean-François Marmontel	13 November 1753	Fontainebleau, Théâtre du château
48	La naissance d'Osiris, ou La fête Pamilie	acte de ballet	1 act	Louis de Cahusac	12 October 1754	Fontainebleau, Théâtre du château
30	Anacréon (1754)	acte de ballet	1 act	Louis de Cahusac	23 October 1754	Fontainebleau, Théâtre du château
58	Anacréon (1757)	acte de ballet	1 act (a completely different work from the above, it was given as the 3rd entrée of a revised version of Les surprises de l'Amour)	Pierre-Joseph-Justin Bernard	31 May 1757	Paris, Opéra, Palais-Royal
51	Les Paladins	comédie lyrique	3 acts	Jean-François Duplat de Monticourt, after Jean de La Fontaine's Le petit chien qui secoue l'argent et des perrieres and Ludovico Ariosto's Orlando furioso	12 February 1760	Paris, Opéra, Palais-Royal
31	Les Boréades (Abaris)	tragédie en musique	5 acts	Louis de Cahusac	unperformed, in rehearsal 1763	
50	Nélée et Myrthis or Les beaux jours de l'amour	acte de ballet	1 act		unperformed	
61	Zéphire or Les nymphes de Diane	acte de ballet	1 act		unperformed	
45	Io	acte de ballet	1 act, incomplete		unperformed, unfinished	
