= Io (opera) =

Unfinished opera by Rameau

- Opera by Jean-Philippe Rameau
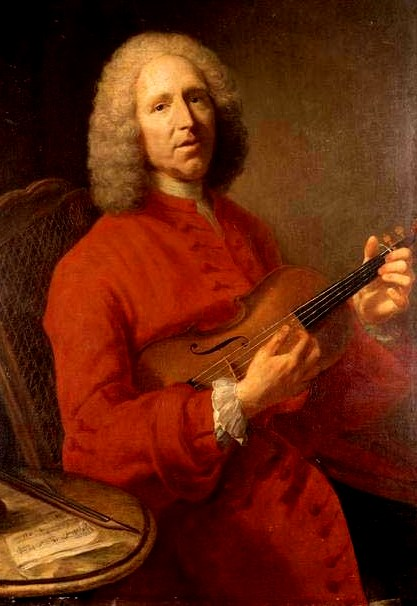
- Portrait of Rameau by Jacques Aved, c. 1728
- Language: French
- Based on: myth of Io
- Premiere: 2023; Kennedy Center, Washington, D.C.

Io is an unfinished opera by Jean-Philippe Rameau in the form of a one-act acte de ballet. The date of its composition is unknown and it was probably unperformed during Rameau's lifetime. There is no overture or chorus and only a single dance. The score consists of recitative, arias and vocal ensembles.

French musicologist Sylvie Bouissou completed the opera and it received its first performance by Opera Lafayette and dancers from Seán Curran Company at the Kennedy Center in Washington, D.C. and El Museo del Barrio in New York in May 2023. "'To try to complete the work and give it a possible life at last after almost three hundred years, it was quite a challenge, believe me', Bouissou tells Morning Edition host Leila Fadel ... 'I was excited with this experience, because it's wonderful, finally it's a rebirth. And with this type of experience and other productions in the world, I know why I do this difficult job – serving Rameau, an absolute genius', she says."

== Theories of authorship ==
Io's unfinished state meant that it was once believed to be Rameau's last opera, but it contains a duet which appears in revised form in Les fêtes de Polymnie (1745). This has led the musicologist Graham Sadler to conclude that Io must predate 1745 and that the librettist was Louis de Cahusac, who also wrote the words for Les fêtes, because French librettists did not borrow from other writers.

The French Rameau specialist Sylvie Bouissou proposes a different theory in her biography of the composer. She sees parallels between the plot of Io and that of Rameau's comic opera Platée (1745): in both works Jupiter and Apollo try to seduce a naive nymph, arousing the jealousy of Juno, and both contain the character of La Folie (Madness). This points to Adrien-Joseph Le Valois d'Orville as the probable author. In Bouissou's hypothesis, Le Valois d'Orville wrote Io at some point before 1745. The score was never completed or performed but Rameau remembered his work and later asked him to revise Jacques Autreau's libretto for Platée. Le Valois d'Orville added features which had appeared in Io, including the role of La Folie and a storm.

== Roles ==
Roles, voice types
| Role | Voice type |
|---|---|
| Mercure (Mercury) | soprano |
| Jupiter, under the name of "Hilas" | baritone |
| Io | soprano |
| Apollon (Apollo), under the name of "Philémon" | alto |
| La Folie (Madness) | soprano |

== Synopsis ==
Mercury warns Jupiter that his jealous wife Juno is approaching. Jupiter tells Mercury his new love is the young nymph Io, whom he plans to seduce in the guise of a shepherd, Hylas. He has a rival in the god Apollo, who has also been wooing Io, disguised as the shepherd Philemon. Io enters and tells "Hylas" that she prefers him to "Philemon", but when Philemon expresses his despair she feels sorry for him. A storm breaks out. When Jupiter conjures it away, Io realises that "Hylas" must be a god and Jupiter at last reveals his true identity. The two declare their love for each other.

In the next scene, La Folie (Madness) announces that Apollo has abandoned Mount Parnassus and she has taken advantage of the chaos to steal his lyre. At this point, the opera breaks off.
