= Samson (opera) =

1734 opera by Jean-Philippe Rameau

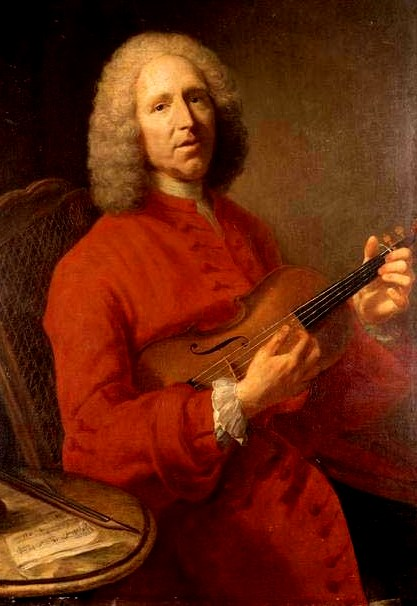
Jean-Philippe Rameau

Samson is an opera by the French composer Jean-Philippe Rameau with a libretto by Voltaire. The work was never staged due to censorship, although Voltaire later printed his text. Rameau intended the opera on the theme of Samson and Delilah as the successor to his debut Hippolyte et Aricie, which premiered in October 1733. Like Hippolyte, Samson was a tragédie en musique in five acts and a prologue. Voltaire had become a great admirer of Rameau's music after seeing Hippolyte and suggested a collaboration with the composer in November 1733. The opera was complete by late summer 1734 and went into rehearsal. However, a work on a religious subject with a libretto by such a notorious critic of the Church was bound to run into controversy and Samson was banned. An attempt to revive the project in a new version in 1736 also failed. The score is lost, although Rameau recycled some of the music from Samson in his later operas.

== Background ==
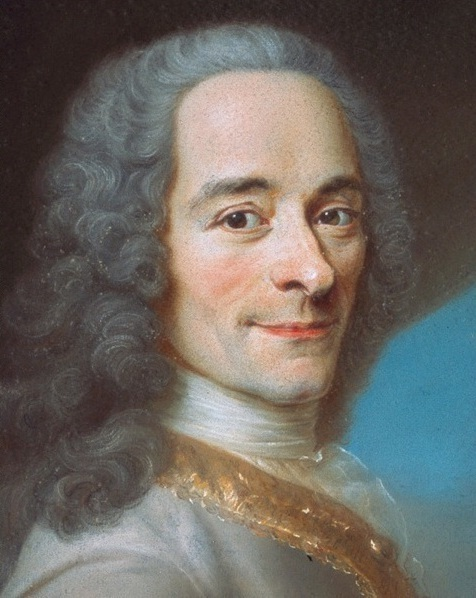
Voltaire in 1736

=== Rameau and Voltaire in 1733 ===
Rameau was 50 when he made his operatic debut with the tragédie en musique Hippolyte et Aricie at the Paris Opéra on 1 October 1733. Hippolyte provoked immense controversy, with conservative critics attacking it because of the music's "quantity, complexity and allegedly Italianate character". They also feared Rameau's new style would destroy the traditional French operatic repertoire, especially the works of its founder Jean-Baptiste Lully. Disputes would rage for years between Rameau's supporters, the so-called ramistes (or ramoneurs, literally "chimney sweeps"), and his opponents, the lullistes.

By 1733 Voltaire had enjoyed considerable success as a playwright but had written nothing for the operatic stage. Early that year he wrote his first libretto, Tanis et Zélide, set in ancient Egypt. He had also attracted controversy of his own and been imprisoned in the Bastille for his satirical writings in 1717.

=== First attempt: 1733—1734 ===
Voltaire knew little about Rameau before the premiere of Hippolyte. He was initially sceptical about the composer and his new musical style, writing, "He is a man who has the misfortune to know more about music than Lully. In musical matters he is a pedant; he is meticulous and tedious." However, on further acquaintance his doubts about Rameau and his music changed to enthusiasm and a desire to work with the composer. He put aside Tanis and began writing a new tragédie en musique based on the story of Samson with Rameau in mind.

The choice of a Biblical subject was surprising as neither Voltaire nor Rameau were devoutly religious and Voltaire had a growing reputation for impiety. However, both had been educated at schools run by the Jesuits, where they had probably seen stagings of sacred dramas. There was also the recent example of Montéclair's opera Jephté, premiered in Paris in 1732 and based on the Old Testament story of Jephthah. Even that had faced problems with censorship when the Archbishop of Paris had temporarily suspended performances, but Voltaire probably believed that the story of Samson would be more acceptable because it was less religious than that of Jephthah. A translation of an Italian play about Samson had also been performed in Paris in the spring of 1732 with no complaints from the authorities.

The first mention of Samson comes from a letter of 20 November 1733. Rameau urged Voltaire to finish the libretto as soon as possible and by December it was ready. A notice in the journal Anecdotes ou lettres secrètes shows that Rameau had completed the score by August 1734. By that time there were already doubts about the likelihood of the work being able to pass the censor unscathed. In June 1734 the Parliament of Paris had condemned Voltaire's Lettres philosophiques and the book had been burned publicly in front of the Palais de Justice. Voltaire fled to Cirey to escape imprisonment in the Bastille. On 14 September Voltaire's friend Madame du Châtelet wrote that the censors of the Sorbonne had begun to make nitpicking complaints about Samson, for example, Voltaire had attributed some of the miracles of Moses to Samson, he had made fire from heaven fall from the right rather than the left ("a great blasphemy"), and he had only put one column in the Philistine temple instead of the requisite two.

Although Voltaire's absence made work on the opera difficult, rehearsals of Samson went ahead on 23 October 1734 at the home of Louis Fagon, the Intendant des finances. Madame du Châtelet commented on the music in a letter, praising the overture, some airs for the violin, a chaconne and the music of the third and fifth acts. However, the censor Abbé Hardion now forbade the work from being staged. The libretto's mixture of the sacred and profane, as well as the choice of Delilah (a seductress and betrayer) as heroine, together with Voltaire's recent clash with the authorities, all probably contributed to the ban. As Graham Sadler writes, Samson's central theme was "the struggle against tyranny and religious intolerance."

=== Second attempt: 1736 ===
After the success of Rameau's opéra-ballet Les Indes galantes in 1735, Voltaire persuaded Rameau to revive the Samson project. Voltaire finished his reworking of the libretto on 10 February 1736 and Rameau completed the music some time that Spring. Despite rumours that Samson would appear at the Opéra after 6 April, it was never staged. The reasons why are unclear but were mostly probably censorship again, as Voltaire claimed when the libretto was finally published in 1745.

=== Voltaire's innovations ===
Voltaire wanted his libretto to be as groundbreaking as Rameau's music had been for Hippolyte et Aricie. The following are some of the innovative features of Samson's libretto, not all of which Rameau accepted:

- Discarding the prologue. Tragédies en musique in the Lullian style always began with an allegorical prologue, usually with no direct relation to the main action of the opera. Voltaire wanted to get rid of this feature and only grudgingly supplied a prologue after Rameau begged him to do so. Samson's prologue is remarkably short, only 85 lines long. Rameau would only dispense with the prologue in his Zoroastre in 1749.
- Reduction of the amount of recitative. Voltaire found recitative boring and reduced it in favour of a greater number of ensembles and choruses, things he felt were Rameau's strong suit.
- The character of Delilah. Rameau was worried that Delilah only appears in the third and fourth acts. The love interest in a tragédie lyrique usually began in the first act and the heroine had a rival, creating a love triangle. In Samson there are no female voices - outside the chorus - in the first two acts, something which troubled Rameau. Voltaire replied that this was necessary to establish the warlike character of Samson and, besides, the acts were relatively short. He predicted that not everyone would appreciate the character of Delilah: "An opera heroine who is not at all amorous will perhaps not be accepted. While my detractors say my work is too impious, the parterre will find it too wise and too severe. They will be disheartened at seeing love treated only as a seduction in a theatre where it is always consecrated as a virtue."
- A dramatic ending. French operas usually finished with a divertissement, with celebratory choruses and dancing. Voltaire ends Samson abruptly when the hero brings down the Philistine temple, killing himself and his enemies. This finale probably appealed to Rameau's dramatic instincts.

=== Rameau's reuse of the music ===
In his preface to the printed libretto of 1745 Voltaire wrote that Rameau had salvaged some of the music from Samson for use in later operas. He specified which works in a letter to Chabanon in 1768, naming "Les Incas de Pérou" (the second act of Les Indes galantes), Castor et Pollux and Zoroastre. The Rameau specialist Cuthbert Girdlestone doubts the reliability of Voltaire's memory here. An anonymous correspondent in the Journal de Paris of 5 January 1777 quoted "someone who had often heard the celebrated Rameau assert" that many of the "finest pieces" in Les fêtes d'Hébé were originally from Samson:

"...[and] that the music of the River divertissement in the first act was the piece intended to portray the water spurting from the rock [Samson, Act 2]; that the great piece for Tyrtée had been put in Samson's mouth when he reproached the Israelites for their cowardice [Samson, Act 1]; that the divertissement in the third act was the Festival of Adonis [Samson, Act 3], finally, that the chaconne of Les Indes galantes was used in Samson to summon the people to the feet of the true God."

Two pieces from Samson later appeared in two operatic collaborations between Rameau and Voltaire in 1745: an aria for Delilah became "Echo, voix errante" in La princesse de Navarre; and an aria for Samson became "Profonds abîmes du Ténare" in Le temple de la Gloire. Graham Sadler also suggests that some music may have been reused in the 1753 version of Les fêtes de Polymnie.

Girdlestone regretted the loss of Samson, regarding the libretto as "the best Rameau was ever to set." The failure of Samson did not end the collaboration between Rameau and Voltaire. In 1740 Voltaire proposed setting his libretto Pandore. This came to nothing, but the composer and playwright eventually collaborated on three works which did make it to the stage in 1745: Le temple de la gloire, La princesse de Navarre and Les fêtes de Ramire. Camille Saint-Saëns took some inspiration from Voltaire's Samson when working on the first draught of his opera Samson et Dalila.

=== Paris, 1791 ===
A portion of the opera was performed in Paris in 1791, when the remains of Voltaire were brought to the Panthéon in a huge procession during the early French Revolution. A portion performed went: "People, wake up, break your irons / Rise again to your former greatness / Liberty calls on you / You who were born for it."

=== Aix-en-Provence, 2024 ===
In 2024, for its seventy-sixth production, the Festival of Aix-en-Provence introduced a reconstruction of the lost opera Samson. The collaboration between conductor and composer Raphaël Pichon, and theatrical director Claus Guth tried to present this Samson as "not to recreate the letter, but to revive the spirit." In an interview Raphaël Pichon quoted Voltaire's proposal to Rameau, revealing his underlying political motives, "I suggest to you that we should make the opera part of the revolution, because today the opera is lost in the byways of entertainment. We should allow the world to see it, to ask the big questions." To Raphaël Pichon this was the main reason the censors banned the work, especially "the last verses of Act III in the original libretto: People, wake up. People, rise up. People, break your irons. Fight for liberty."

The reconstructed Samson was first performed on 4 July 2024 at the Théâtre de l'Archevêché during the Festival of Aix-en-Provence. The score was provided by Raphael Pichon, and the script written by Claus Guth in collaboration with Eddy Garaudel, under the direction of playwright Yvonne Gebauer.

== Roles ==
Prologue
La volupté (Sensual Pleasure)
Bacchus
Hercule (Hercules)
La vertu (Virtue)
Plaisirs et Amours (Pleasures and Cupids)
Suivants de la Vertu (Followers of Virtue)
Opera
Samson
Dalila (Delilah)
Le roi des Philistins (King of the Philistines)
Le grand prêtre (High Priest)
Chorus:

== Synopsis ==
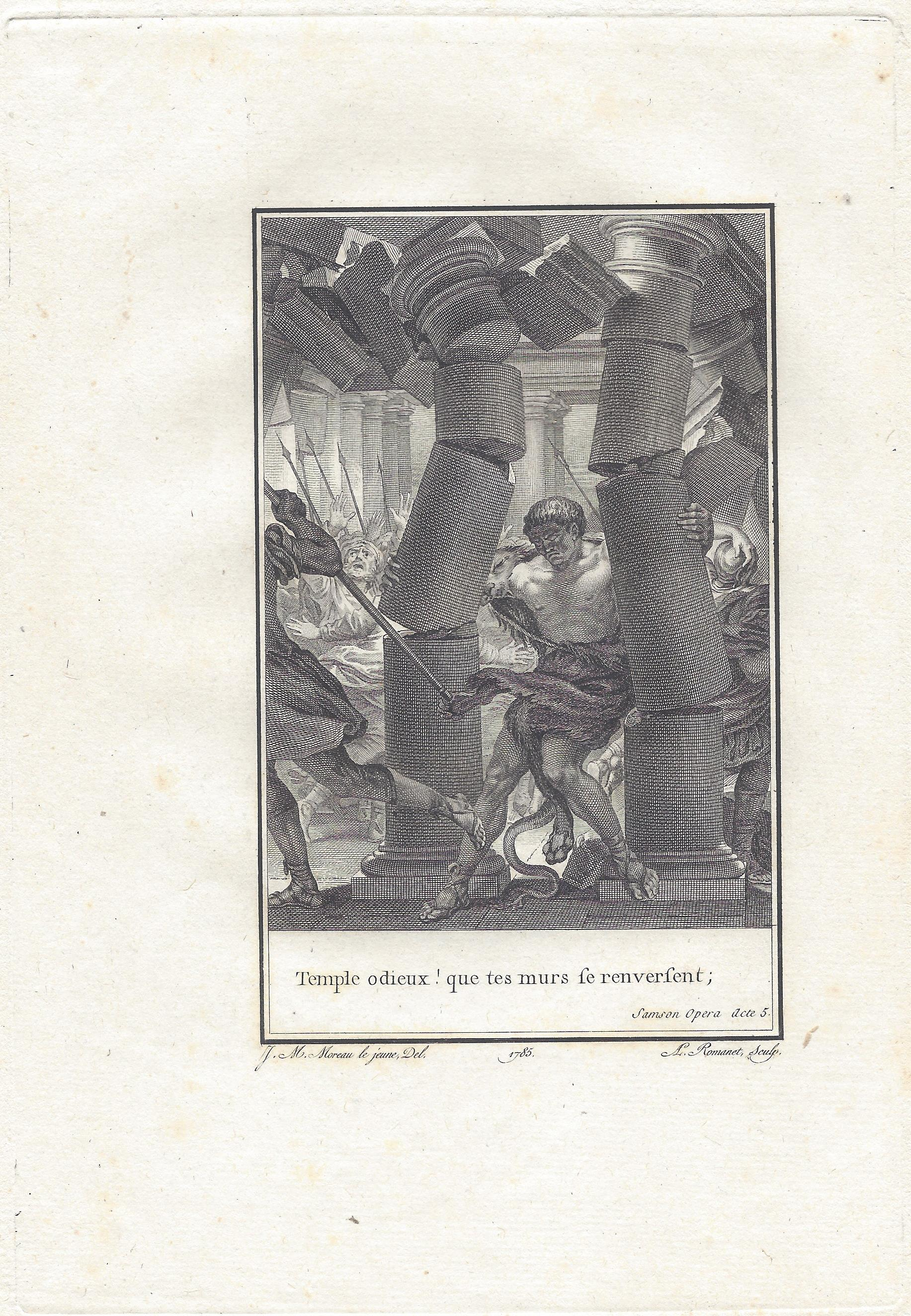
Temple Odieux! que tes murs fe renverfent (1785), etching by Antoine-Louis Romanet and Jean-Michel Moreau

=== Prologue ===
La Volupté (Sensual Pleasure) celebrates her long reign over the people of Paris. Hercules and Bacchus admit that love has made them forget about their famous military victories and they offer their obedience to Pleasure. Suddenly, Virtue arrives in a blinding light. She reassures Pleasure that she has not come to banish her but to use her help in persuading mortals to follow the lessons of truth. She says he will now present the audience with a true, not a mythical, Hercules (i.e. Samson) and show how love caused his downfall.

=== Act 1 ===
On the banks of the River Adonis, the Israelite captives deplore their fate under Philistine domination. The Philistines plan to force the Israelites to worship their idols. Samson arrives, dressed in a lion skin, and smashes the pagan altars. He urges the defenceless Israelites to put their faith in God who has given him the strength to defeat the Philistines.

=== Act 2 ===
In his royal palace the King of the Philistines learns of Samson's liberation of the captives and the defeat of the Philistine army. Samson enters, carrying a club in one hand and an olive branch in the other. He offers peace if the king will free the Israelites. When the king refuses, Samson proves that God is on his side by making water spontaneously flow from the marble walls of the palace. The king still refuses to submit so God sends fire from heaven which destroys the Philistines' crops. Finally, the king agrees to free the Israelites and the captives rejoice.

=== Act 3 ===
The Philistines, including the king, the high priest and Delilah, pray to their gods Mars and Venus to save them from Samson. An oracle declares that only the power of love can defeat Samson.

Fresh from his victories, Samson arrives and is lulled to sleep by the murmuring of a stream and the music of the priestesses of Venus, celebrating the festival of Adonis. Delilah begs the goddess to help her seduce Samson. Samson falls for her charms in spite of the warnings of a chorus of Israelites. He reluctantly leaves for battle again, after swearing his love for Delilah.

=== Act 4 ===
The High Priest urges Delilah to find out the secret of Samson's extraordinary strength. Samson enters; he is prepared to make peace with the Philistines in return for Delilah's hand in marriage. He overcomes his initial reluctance for the wedding to take place in the Temple of Venus. Delilah says she will only marry him if he reveals the source of his strength to her and Samson tells her it lies in his long hair. There is a roll of thunder and the Temple of Venus disappears in darkness; Samson realises he has betrayed God. The Philistines rush in and take him captive, leaving Delilah desperately regretting her betrayal.

=== Act 5 ===
Samson is in the Philistine temple, blinded and in chains. He laments his fate with a chorus of captive Israelites, who bring him news that Delilah has killed herself. The king torments Samson further by making him witness the Philistine victory celebrations. Samson calls on God to punish the king's blasphemy. Samson promises to reveal the Israelites' secrets so long as the Israelites are removed from the temple. The king agrees and, once the Israelites have left, Samson seizes the columns of the temple and pushes them over, bringing down the whole building on himself and the Philistines.

== Sources ==
- Cuthbert Girdlestone, Jean-Philippe Rameau: His Life and Work, Dover, New York 1969 (paperback edition).
- Amanda Holden (ed.): The Viking Opera Guide, Viking, New York 1993.
- Charles Dill: Monstrous Opera: Rameau and the Tragic Tradition. Princeton University Press, Princeton/NJ 1998.
- Sylvie Bouissou: Jean-Philippe Rameau: Musicien des lumières. Fayard, Paris 2014.
- Graham Sadler: The Rameau Compendium. Boydell Press, Woodbridge/UK 2014.
- Julien Dubruque, essay on "The Stormy Collaboration Between Voltaire and Rameau" in the book accompanying Guy Van Waas's recording of Le temple de la Gloire (Ricercar, 2015).
