= Marilyn Hill Smith =

Marilyn Hill Smith is an English soprano (born February 1952) whose UK-based performing career ranged from Handel to contemporary operatic works and from Gilbert and Sullivan to Viennese operetta and musicals. Her entry in The New Grove Dictionary of Opera comments that her "bright, flexible voice and charming appearance are perfect for operetta, and [...] Handel roles, particularly light and florid ones".

== Career ==
Smith was born February 1952 in Surrey. She studied from 1970 to 1974 at the Guildhall School of Music and Drama in London with Arthur Reckless. Her graduating performance was praised by one critic: a "quite exceptional Pamina was contributed by Marilyn Hill Smith – the registers of the voice much more firmly knitted together than usual in student sopranos, the expression apt, the diction and movement decisive." She was selected in 1975 as "an outstanding Young Musician", and the following year took part in the first performance of the Bicentennial Offenbach pastiche Christopher Columbus, a recording of which was subsequently released. Her professional debut was with English National Opera at the London Coliseum as Adele in Die Fledermaus in 1978. She followed this at ENO as the Pot boy, Wonderchild and Student in The Adventures of Mr Brouček, Woglinde and the Woodbird in Das Rheingold ("Marilyn Hill Smith led the trio of Rhinemaidens sweetly and was a completely audible Woodbird"), Despina in Così fan tutte, Blonde in Die Entführung aus dem Serail, Susanna in Le Nozze Di Figaro, Olympia, Stella, and one of the voices in the Barcarolle in The Tales of Hoffmann, Zerbinetta in Ariadne auf Naxos, Fiakermilli in Arabella, and in the British premiere of Le Grand Macabre in 1982 she sang Venus and the Chief of the Secret Police. She sang the role of the Girl in a 1980 radio performance with the London Sinfonietta of Viktor Ullmann's The Emperor of Atlantis.

She appeared with the English Bach Festival in La princesse de Navarre and in April 1976 she sang the title role in Pygmalion by Rameau and one of the lovers in L'Amour flechy par la Constance of 1697 by Delalande in Whitehall Palace. She had also sung Aricie in Hippolyte et Aricie, Almirena in Rinaldo, Télaire in Castor et Pollux, and Belinda in Dido and Aeneas for the Festival. Her Covent Garden debut was in Peter Grimes (First niece) in 1981, and later for the English Bach Festival as Calliope in Alceste in 2002. In the Handel tercentenary year she appeared as Agilea in Teseo in July 1985 at Covent Garden, and the following month at the Herodes Atticus Theatre in Greece.

At Sadler's Wells Theatre she appeared in 1984 as Lady Harriet in Martha by Flotow, and in 1985 as Sylva in Kálmán's The Gypsy Princess. In Jonathan Miller’s 1988 production of Candide with Scottish Opera in Glasgow and then at The Old Vic in London she took the role of Cunegonde, which was televised from Glasgow. She appeared in 'Glamorous Night' in the 1990 Royal Variety Performance on the occasion of the Queen Mother's 90th birthday at the London Palladium.

She appeared with Welsh National Opera (Musetta and Konstanze), Scottish Opera (Cunegonde) and Singapore Opera. She made many broadcasts as a singer on BBC radio's Friday Night Is Music Night and the operetta and musical comedy programme Top C's and Tiaras on Channel 4 television. At the Proms she appeared as Suzanne in Robinson Crusoé by Offenbach in 1980, as Angelina in Trial by Jury and the title role of Patience, both by Gilbert and Sullivan, in 1988, and Viennese operetta selections in 1989. For the 1989 BBC radio series of Savoy operas, Hill Smith sang Lady Ella (Patience), Phyllis (Iolanthe), Casilda (The Gondoliers) and Julia Jellicoe (The Grand Duke).

Hill Smith toured the United Kingdom in the Andrew Lloyd Webber/David Ian production of The Sound of Music as Mother Abbess, in 2009 to 2010, and performed in "We’ll Meet Again" more than 100 times. In 2013 she played Heidi Schiller in Sondheim's Follies at the Opéra de Toulon.

== Selected discography ==
- Offenbach (arr) : Christopher Columbus (Opera Rara, 1977) – Gretel
- Cavalli : Ercole amante (Erato, 1979) – Cinthia
- Rameau - La princesse de Navarre (Erato, 1980) – soprano solos
- Meyerbeer : Dinorah (Opera Rara, 1980) – the goatgirl
- Offenbach : Robinson Crusoe (Opera Rara, 1981) – Suzanne
- Brian : The Tigers (Testament, 1983) – Lady 2 and Toy seller
- Kálmán : Countess Maritza (Jay, 1983) – Maritza
- Rameau : Pygmalion (Erato, 1984) – La Statue, Céphise
- Lehár : The Count of Luxembourg (TER, 1985) – Angèle
- Lloyd : Iernin (Albany, 1985) – Iernin
- Sullivan : Ruddigore (TER Classics, 1987) – Rose Maybud
- Bernstein : Candide (TER, 1988) – Cunegonde
- Vivaldi : Dixit Dominus in D RV594 (CBS, 1990) – soprano soloist
- Sullivan : The Pirates of Penzance (TER, 1990) – Mabel
- Romberg : The Student Prince (Showtime, 1995) – Kathie
- Sullivan : The Rose of Persia (CPO, 2005) – Scent-of-Lilies

Hill Smith has also recorded compilation albums of songs from operettas and musicals, including Treasures of Operetta, vols. 1 (1985) 2 (1988) and 3 (1990), Marilyn Hill Smith Sings Kálmán and Lehár (1991), Moonstruck – 'Edwardian Theatre Music' (1992), and she took part in Opera Rara's 9-LP, three-volume anthology of Italian opera from 1800 to 1830 (1990). A solo album entitled 'Is it really me?' with songs by Lehar, Kálmán, Bernstein, Romberg, Novello, Coward and others was released in 1991 by TER. On video she appeared as a Niece on a film of Peter Grimes conducted by Colin Davis.
