= Ballot de Sauvot =

Sylvain Ballot de Sauvot (1703 – December 1760) was an 18th-century French lawyer at Parlement of Paris and man of letters amateur, belonging to the entourage of Jean-Philippe Rameau (Sylvain Ballot, his brother, was Rameau's notary).

He reworked the librettos of Pygmalion, acte de ballet set in music by Rameau, and that of the comédie lyrique Platée for the revival at Académie royale de musique 9 February 1749, after the première had taken place in Versailles, four years before.

During the Querelle des Bouffons, he defended Rameau, whom he greatly admired, and fought a duel in 1753 with the castrato Gaetano Caffarelli.
