= Antoine Gautier de Montdorge =

French man of letters

Antoine-César Gautier de Montdorge (or Mondorge) (17 January 1701 or 1707 – 24 October 1768) was a French man of letters, best known for writing the libretto for Rameau's opéra-ballet Les fêtes d'Hébé (1739). Born in Lyon, he moved to Paris, where he worked as a financier (with the title "maître à la Chambre aux deniers du Roi"). He was a friend and neighbour of Rameau's patron Alexandre Le Riche de La Pouplinière and probably met the composer at La Pouplinière's salon. Montdorge was not identified as the author of Les fêtes d'Hébé on any of its printed editions. It was first attributed to him by Antoine de Léris in the 1763 edition of his Dictionnaire portatif des théâtres. Reviewers severely criticised the literary weakness of the work. The only other opera libretto Montdorge wrote was the one-act comédie-ballet L'opéra de société for Jean-François Giraud in 1762. He described his experience working as a librettist for Rameau in the anonymously published Réflections d'un peintre sur l'opéra (1743).

Montdorge was also interested in the fine arts. He wrote three articles for the Encyclopédie on engraving and published a work on colour printing, L'art d'imprimer les tableaux en trois couleurs, in 1755.

== Works ==
- Les Fêtes d'Hébé, ou les talents lyriques, opéra-ballet in three acts (music by Rameau) presented in 1739, revived in 1747 and 1766 and printed in-4°;
- Réflexions d'un peintre sur l'opéra, 1741, in-12;
- [Le Blon], L'Art d'imprimer les tableaux en trois couleurs, 1756, in-8°;
- L'Opéra de société, in one act; music by Giraud, performed in 1762;
- Conte oriental, Paris, 1767.

== Sources ==
- Bouissou, Sylvie Jean-Philippe Rameau (Fayard, 2014)
- Girdlestone, Cuthbert, Jean-Philippe Rameau: His Life and Work (Cassell & Company Ltd, 1962; Dover paperback)
- Sadler, Graham The Rameau Compendium (Boydell, 2014)
