= Nonancourt =

- Commune
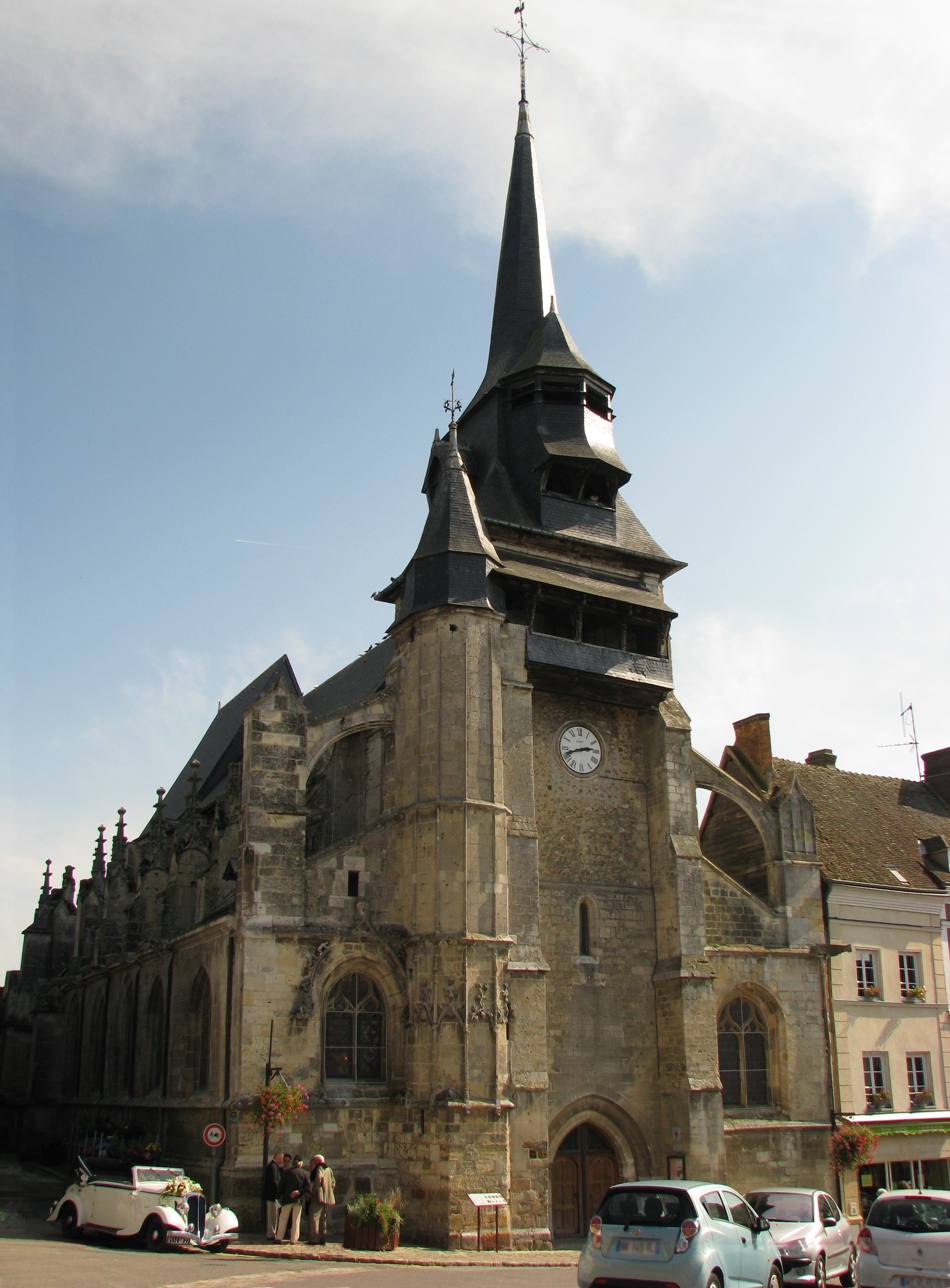
- The church in Nonancourt

- Coat of arms
- Location of Nonancourt
- Location within France Location within Normandy
- Coordinates: 48°46′38″N 1°11′39″E
- Country: France
- Region: Normandy
- Department: Eure
- Arrondissement: Évreux
- Canton: Verneuil d'Avre et d'Iton
- Intercommunality: CA Pays de Dreux

Government
  - Mayor (2022–2026): Jean-Loup Justeau
- Area^{1}: 7.21 km^{2} (2.78 sq mi)
- Elevation: 171 m (561 ft)
- Highest elevation: 152 m (499 ft)
- Lowest elevation: 97 m (318 ft)
- Population (2023): 2,321
  - Density: 322/km^{2} (834/sq mi)
- Time zone: UTC+01:00 (CET)
  - Summer (DST): UTC+02:00 (CEST)
- INSEE/Postal code: 27438 /27320
- ^{1} French Land Register data, which excludes lakes, ponds, glaciers > 1 km^{2} (0.386 sq mi or 247 acres) and river estuaries.

Nonancourt (French pronunciation: [nɔnɑ̃kuʁ]) is a commune in the Eure department in Normandy in northern France. The writer Louis-François Beffara (1751–1838) and the playwright Lucien Besnard (1872–1955) were born in Nonancourt. Nonancourt station has rail connections to Argentan, Paris and Granville.

Since 1975 Nonancourt has been twinned with Earls Colne in Essex.

== Population ==
Historical population

Year	Pop.	±% p.a.
1793	1,128	—
1800	1,204	+0.94%
1806	1,243	+0.53%
1821	1,359	+0.60%
1831	1,345	−0.10%
1836	1,410	+0.95%
1841	1,529	+1.63%
1846	1,629	+1.28%
1851	1,641	+0.15%
1856	1,590	−0.63%
1861	1,404	−2.46%
1866	1,750	+4.50%
1872	1,817	+0.63%
1876	1,983	+2.21%
1881	2,075	+0.91%
1886	2,072	−0.03%
1891	2,058	−0.14%
1896	2,073	+0.15%
1901	2,054	−0.18%

Year	Pop.	±% p.a.
1906	2,046	−0.08%
1911	1,826	−2.25%
1921	1,694	−0.75%
1926	1,748	+0.63%
1931	1,733	−0.17%
1936	1,673	−0.70%
1946	1,685	+0.07%
1954	1,736	+0.37%
1962	1,794	+0.41%
1968	1,688	−1.01%
1975	1,862	+1.41%
1982	1,752	−0.87%
1990	2,184	+2.79%
1999	2,320	+0.67%
2007	2,152	−0.94%
2012	2,323	+1.54%
2017	2,282	−0.36%
2023	2,321	+0.28%

Source: EHESS and INSEE (1968-2023)

== See also ==
- Communes of the Eure department
