= Les fêtes d'Hébé =

1739 opera by Jean-Philippe Rameau

- Opera by Jean-Philippe Rameau
- Title page
- Librettist: Antoine Gautier de Montdorge
- Language: French
- Premiere: 21 May 1739; Theatre in the Palais-Royal, Paris

Les fêtes d'Hébé, ou Les talens lyriques (The Festivities of Hebe, or The Lyric Talents) is an opéra-ballet in a prologue and three entrées (acts) by the French composer Jean-Philippe Rameau. The libretto was written by Antoine Gautier de Montdorge (1707–1768). The work was first performed on 21 May 1739 by the Académie royale de musique at its theatre in the Palais-Royal in Paris.

== Performance history ==
Les fêtes d'Hébé was Rameau's second opera-ballet; his first, Les Indes galantes, had appeared in 1735. It was first performed at the Paris Opéra on 21 May 1739. The famous dancer Marie Sallé appeared as Terpsichore in the third entrée. Montdorge was a friend of Rameau's patron Alexandre Le Riche de La Poupelinière. His libretto came in for heavy criticism and the second entrée had to be revised with the aid of Simon-Joseph Pellegrin, who had written the words for Rameau's first opera, Hippolyte et Aricie. In spite of the weak libretto, the work was an immediate success and became one of Rameau's most popular operas, enjoying 80 performances in its first year. It was revived in 1747, 1756 and 1764 (with set designs supervised by François Boucher and the role of Iphise taken by Sophie Arnould). Thereafter, 18th century productions only gave partial versions of the work.

== Roles ==
Roles, voice types, premiere cast
Role	Voice type	Premiere cast, 21 May 1739 Conductor: André Chéron
Prologue
Hébé (Hebe)	soprano	Marie Fel
L'Amour (Cupid)	soprano	Mlle Bourbonnois
Momus	taille (baritenor)	Louis-Antoine Cuvillier
The Charites	dancers	Mlles Dalmand-L., Le Breton, Fremicourt
Zephir (Zephyrus)	dancer	Mr Hamoche
Chorus: Sports and Pleasures; Thessalians
Ballet: Thessalians
Première entrée: La poésie
Sapho	soprano	Mlle Erémans
Thélème (Thelemus)	haute-contre	Pierre Jélyotte
Alcée (Alcaeus)	basse-taille (bass-baritone)	Mr Albert
Hymas	basse-taille	Jean Dun fils
A slave girl, performing a naiad	soprano	Marie Fel
A slave man, performing the god of a river	basse-taille	Mr Gouget
Another slave man, performing the god of a stream	haute-contre	Mr Méchain
Chorus: Mariners
Ballet: Mariners (men and women)
Deuxième entrée: La musique
Iphise	soprano	Marie Pélissier
A Spartan woman	soprano	
Lycurgue (Lycurgus)	haute-contre	Jean-Antoine Bérard
The oracle	taille	
Tirtée (Tyrtaeus)	basse-taille	François Le Page
Chorus: Spartans
Ballet: A Cupid and the geniuses of Apollo, Mars, Victory and Hymen (pas de cinq); Warriors; Spartans
Troisième entrée: La danse
Eglé	soprano	Mlle Mariette
A shepherdess	soprano	
Mercure (Mercury)	haute-contre	Pierre Jélyotte
Eurilas	basse-taille	Jean Dun fils
Palémon, a shepherd playing the oboe	musician	
Terpsicore (Terpsichore)	dancer	Marie Sallé
Chorus: Shepherds and shepherdesses
Ballet: Nymphs of Terpsicore; Fauni; silvans; shepherds

== Synopsis ==
Les fêtes d'Hébé takes the form of a typical opéra-ballet: a series of self-contained acts loosely based around a theme, in this the case the "lyric arts" of poetry, music and dance.

=== Prologue ===
Scene: a landscape with Mount Olympus in the background

Hebe is harassed by the unwanted attentions of Momus. Cupid suggests she should escape with him to the banks of the River Seine to witness festivities celebrating the arts.

=== First entrée: Poetry ===
Scene: A grove

On the island of Lesbos, the love of the two poets Sappho and Alcaeus is harmed by the jealous Thelemus, who persuades King Hymas to banish Alcaeus. When the king is out hunting, Sappho surprises him and stages an allegorical play for him, by which Hymas learns the truth. The king pardons Alcaeus and the lovers rejoice.

=== Second entrée: Music ===
Scene: The peristyle of a temple

Iphise, daughter of Lycurgus, King of Sparta, is due to be married to Tyrtaeus, an accomplished musician as well as a warrior. An oracle announces that Iphise must marry the "conqueror of the Messenians" and Tyrtaeus leads his soldiers into battle against them. Iphise views the action in the form of a ballet provided by the oracle. Tyrtaeus is victorious and the act ends with general rejoicing.

=== Third entrée: Dance ===
Scene: a grove with a hamlet in the background. Later, an ornate garden

The shepherdess Eglé, well known for her skill at dancing, is due to choose a husband. The god Mercury visits her village in disguise and falls in love with her, arousing the jealousy of the shepherd Eurilas. Eglé chooses Mercury and the two celebrate with the help of Terpsichore, the muse of dance, and her followers.

== Music ==
The music has received much praise. According to Cuthbert Girdlestone, "Rameau gave of his best. No work of his contains more variety or contains so kaleidoscopically complete a view of his range in lyric, tragedy or pastoral." Graham Sadler has written, "Rameau, by now at the height of his powers, contributes a score of astonishing inventiveness. C'est une musique enchantée, wrote one contemporary with little exaggeration. This is especially true of the third entrée, wonderfully rich in that languorous and often deeply nostalgic music that is one of Rameau's hallmarks."

Rameau included orchestrated versions of several of his harpsichord pieces in the score. For example, L'entretien des Muses in the second entrée from the D major suite in the 1724 Pièces de Clavessin, and the musette and tambourin from the E minor suite in the same book in the third entrée.

The Bourrée from the Prologue was used in the soundtrack of Vatel.

== Recordings ==
=== Complete ===
- Les fêtes d'Hébé – Sophie Daneman, Paul Agnew, Sarah Connolly, Jean-Paul Fouchécourt, Thierry Félix, Les Arts Florissants, conducted by William Christie (Erato Records, 2 CDs, 1997)
- Les fêtes d'Hébé – Chantal Santon Jeffery, Marie Perbost, Olivia Doray, Judith van Wanroij, Reinoud Van Mechelen, Mathias Vidal, Purcell Choir and Orfeo Orchestra, conducted by György Vashegyi (Glossa Music, 3 CDs (incl. 1st and 2nd version of Deuxième entrée: La Musique), 2022)

=== Troisième entrée only ===
- Les fêtes d'Hébé: La danse – Monteverdi Choir and Orchestra, conducted by John Eliot Gardiner (Erato, 1977)
