= Nonancourt station =

Railway station in France

Coordinates: 48.7757°N 1.1930°E

Nonancourt
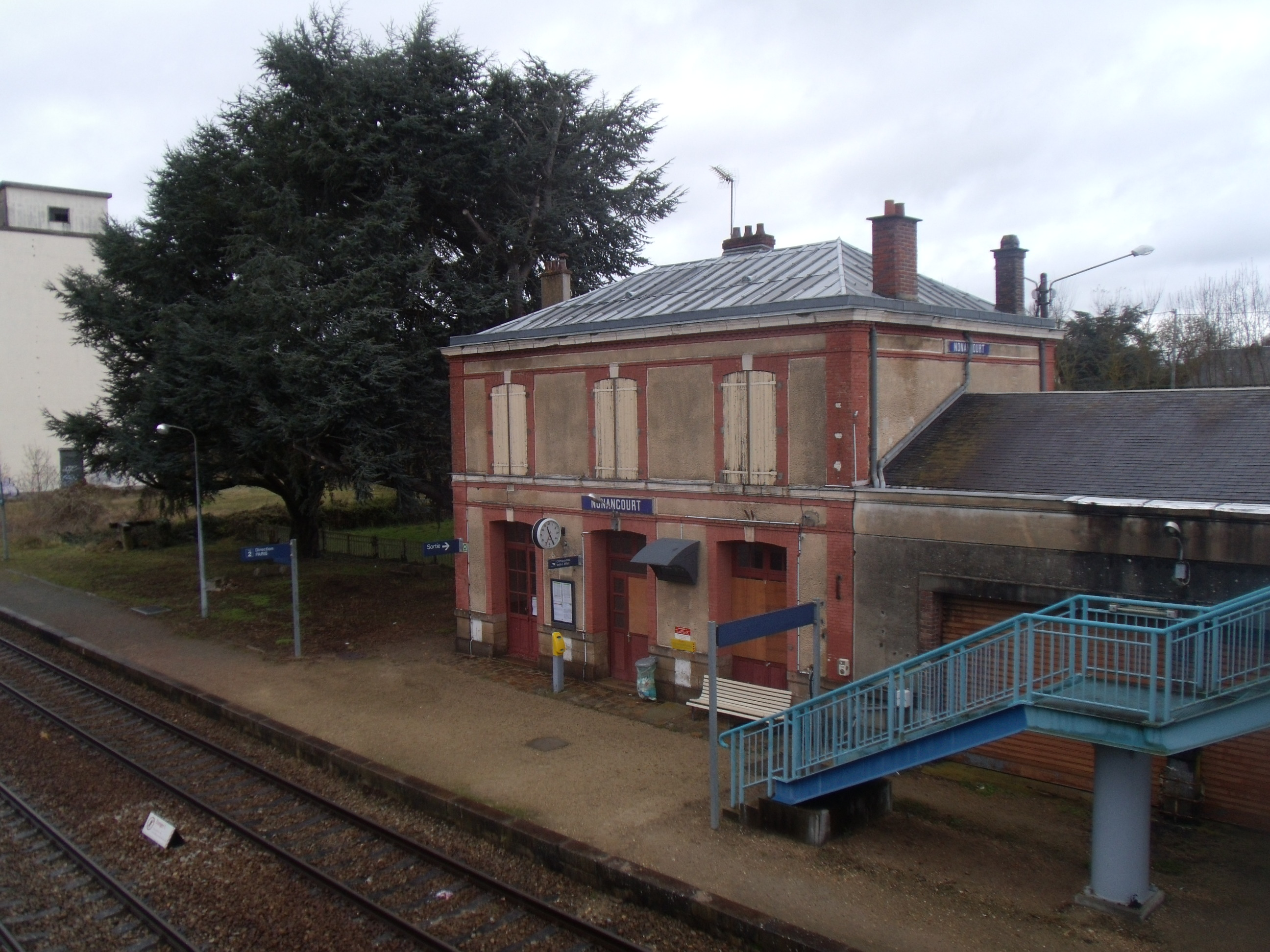
- The passenger building from the footbridge

General information
- Other names: Halte de Nonancourt
- Location: Place de la Gare 27320 Nonancourt; Eure, France
- Elevation: 139 m (456 ft)
- Owner: SNCF
- Operator: SNCF
- Lines: Paris–Granville railway Saint-Cyr–Surdon line
- Distance: KP 96,366 of the Saint-Cyr–Surdon line
- Platforms: 2
- Tracks: 2
- Train operators: TER Normandie
- Connections: none

Construction
- Parking: yes
- Accessible: none

Other information
- Station code: 87393553

History
- Pre-nationalisation: Chemins de fer de l'Ouest

Services
Preceding station	TER Normandie	Following station
Dreux towards Paris-Montparnasse	Krono	Verneuil-sur-Avre towards Granville
Location

Gare de Nonancourt is a railway station in Normandy, France, owned and operated by the SNCF and is served by TER Normandie services. It is situated on the Saint-Cyr to Surdon line, serving the town of Nonancourt, in the Eure department of Normandy.

The location of the station is at a height of 139 m (456 ft) above sea level, at the kilometric point 96,366 of the Saint-Cyr to Surdon line, between the stations of Verneuil-sur-Avre and Dreux.

The station contains a passenger building, which is used as a waiting room for passengers. Tickets are not sold at the station.

The station is equipped with two side platforms and two central tracks. The platform changes are made using a footbridge.

In 2018, the station is served by TER Normandie services between Paris-Montparnasse and Argentan (or Granville).

Parking is available close to the station.

== History ==
In 2015, the annual traffic is estimated around 25,390 commuters.
