= Katia Ledoux =

French mezzo-soprano (born 1990)

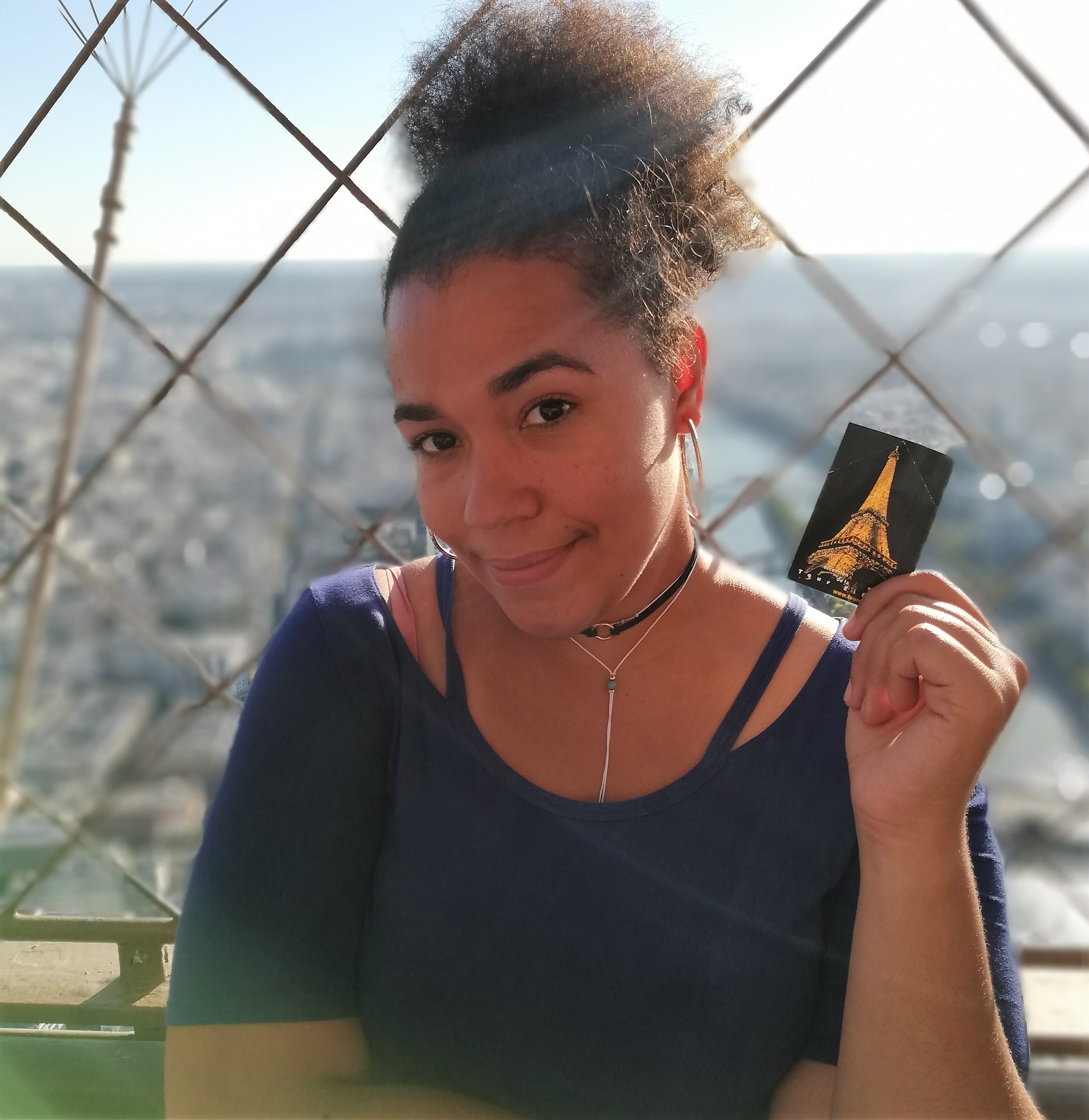
Katia Ledoux in Paris (2018)

Katia Ledoux (born 18 July 1990) is a French mezzo-soprano.

== Life ==
Born in Paris, Ledoux grew up in Vienna, Austria, and took violin lessons before beginning to sing at the age of six, joining the Schubert Sängerknaben. At the age of sixteen, she entered the preparatory class of the University of Music and Performing Arts Vienna, then left Vienna in 2016 to study with Ulf Bästlein at the University of the Arts in the city of Graz where she made her debut at the Steirischer Herbst contemporary music festival as well as the University of Music and Performing Arts Vienna Graz Opera.

For the 2019/20 season, as well as 2020/21, she was part of the International Opera Studio of the Zürich Opera House where she performs numerous roles.

== Career ==
Before even finishing her studies, Ledoux made her debut at the Dutch National Opera in 2019 as Genevieve in Pelléas et Mélisande directed by Olivier Py with the Royal Concertgebouw Orchestra conducted by Stéphane Denève. She came back to Amsterdam in 2021 for the world premiere of How Anansi freed the stories of the world by Neo Muyanga and in 2022 for another world premiere Eurydice - die liebenden blind by Manfred Trojahn. During the 2020-21 pandemic, the Dutch National Opera recorded and streamed Rossini's full Petite Messe Solenelle with the Netherlands Philharmonic Orchestra in which Ledoux performed the alto solo.

In 2019, Ledoux also joined the International Opera Studio at the Zürich Opera where she worked with many big names of the industry including Cecilia Bartoli, Laurence Cummings, Jakub Hrůša, Barrie Kosky, Jakub Orliński or Dmitri Tcherniakov. Since she has returned twice to Zurich: to sing Gertrude in Ted Huffman's Roméo et Juliette in 2023 and Junon in Jetske Mijnssen's Platée conducted by Emmanuelle Haïm in 2024.

In 2021, she traveled to Russia to sing the role of Cornelia in Giulio Cesare with the Moscow Philharmonic Orchestra under Christopher Moulds.

2022 marked her debut at the Staatsoper Stuttgart where she interpreted Ježibaba in Bastian Kraft's Rusalka conducted by Oksana Lyniv

In 2022 Katia Ledoux joined the ensemble of the Vienna Volksoper.

In 2024, Ledoux made her debut at the Royal Opera House as Bersi in Umberto Giordano's Andrea Chénier, in Sir David McVicar's production conducted by Sir Antonio Pappano, with Jonas Kaufmann and Sondra Radvanovsky in the leading roles.

Her performance attracted favourable critical attention, with the Financial Times highlighting her portrayal of Bersi.

== Other ==
Ledoux became a viral phenomenon in January 2023 when multiple international newspapers, radios and websites reported on her jumping in for two roles in one evening, including one for a male tenor colleague during a performance of Orpheus in the Underworld at the Vienna Volksoper. Some noted that this was a historic first.

== Awards ==
- First prize in the Austrian competition Prima la musica In 2008
- Finalist of the "Ferruccio Tagliavini" competition in 2017
- Recipient of the "Bourse of the Bayreuth Festival" in 2018;
- Press Award of the International Vocal Competition 's-Hertogenbosch, Netherlands, 2018.
- First prize of the "Nordfriesischer Liedpreis" competition.
- Oratorio-Lied Prize of the "Francisco Viñas International Singing Competition" in Barcelona in 2022

== Recordings ==
- 2023: La princesse de Trébizonde by Jacques Offenbach with the London Philharmonic Orchestra and Paul Daniel for Opera Rara (as Paola).
