= Charles-Étienne Pesselier =

Charles-Étienne Pesselier (9 July 1712, in Paris – 24 April 1763, in Paris) was an 18th-century French playwright and librettist.

After studying at collège des Quatre-Nations, Pesselier applied for three years to the study of law. He then obtained employment in Ferme générale and showed such skill that he was given responsibility to open a school of finances in his home.

While fulfilling his duties Pesselier devoted his leisure to literature and gave Comédie-Italienne L'École du temps, which was a marked success. The following year, this play was followed by Ésope au Parnasse, also in one act and verse, which was received with applause.

== Works ==
- 1738: L'École du temps, comedy in one act and in verse, successfully given at Théâtre-Italien, 11 September;
- 1739: Ésope au Parnasse, comedy in one act and in verse, presented at Théâtre-Français, 14 October;
- 1739: Lettres d'Angélique à Thérèse, in-12;
- 1748: Fables nouvelles, Paris, in-8°;
- 1742: Pièces de théâtres et poésies fugitives, Paris, in-8°;
- 1753: Dialogues des morts, 2 vol. ln-12;
- 1753: Esprit de Montaigne, 2 vol. in-12;
- 1758: Azor et Ismène, ballet, in-8°;
- 1759: Idée générale des finances, in-fol.;
- 1761: Doutes proposés à l'auteur de la théorie de l'impôt, in-4° (in which Pesselier refutes the "Theory of tax" by Mirabeau;
- 1762: Lettres sur l'éducation, 2 vol. in-12, etc.

Pesselier collaborated with the Glaneur français (1735–1737) and gave editions of the Œuvres by Autreau (1749, 4 vol.) and Pagan (1760, 4 vol.). In addition, he authored the articles Exemption, Ferme (Fermes du Roi (Bail des), Fermes (cinq grosses) of the Encyclopédie by Diderot and D'Alembert.

King Stanisław Leszczyński of Poland gave him the title of ordinary counselor secretary. He was a partner of the Académies de Rouen, Nancy and Angers.

== Sources ==
- Pierre Larousse, Grand Dictionnaire universel du XIXe, vol. 12, Paris, Administration du grand Dictionnaire universel, 1866, (p. 695).
- Alain Nabarra; Pesselier, Charles-Étienne (1712-1763), In J. Sgard: Dictionnaires des journalistes. Grenoble (1976), (p. 299-300)
- Bernard Delmas : « L'anti-physiocratie des financiers : les Doutes de Charles-Étienne Pesselier sur la Théorie de l'impôt du marquis de Mirabeau et l'instruction générale » in : Les Voies De La Richesse ? : La Physiocratie en Question (1760-1850). Gérard Klotz, Philippe Minard & Arnaud Orain (eds.), Presses Universitaires de Rennes, septembre 2017, pp. 79–104.
