= Les Paladins =

1760 opera by Rameau

- Opera by Jean-Philippe Rameau
- Title page of the score
- Language: French
- Based on: Verse tale by Jean de la Fontaine
- Premiere: 12 February 1760; Paris Opera

Les Paladins is an opera by Jean-Philippe Rameau first performed on 12 February 1760 at the Paris Opera. The author of the libretto is not known for sure but was probably one of the Duplat de Monticourt brothers. Rameau called Les Paladins a comédie lyrique, putting it in the same category as his earlier work Platée.

== Authorship of the libretto ==
The identity of the librettist is uncertain. In the 18th century, Charles Collé relayed the rumour that the author was Gentil-Bernard. However, Les spectacles de Paris of 1770 and, later, Louis-François Beffara claimed the text was by Duplat de Monticourt, without specifying whether this meant Jean-François Duplat de Monticourt or his brother Pierre-Jacques. In her 2014 biography of the composer, the Rameau specialist Sylvie Bouissou inclines slightly to the belief it was Pierre-Jacques, given his greater experience of writing for the theatre.

The plot is based on a verse tale by Jean de la Fontaine, Le petit chien qui secoue de l'argent et des pierreries (The Little Dog shaking Money and Gems), itself derived from an episode in Ludovico Ariosto's Orlando Furioso.

== Roles ==
Roles, voice types, premiere cast
Role	Voice type	Premiere cast, 12 February 1760
Anselme	bass	Monsieur Gélin
Argie	soprano	Sophie Arnould
Orcan	baritone	Henri Larrivée
Nérine	soprano	Marie-Jeanne Lemière
Atis	haute-contre	Lombard
La fée Manto	haute-contre	Jean-Pierre Pillot
Un paladin	haute-contre	Muguet

== Synopsis ==
=== Act 1 ===
Scene: An old castle near a forest
Argie is in love with the paladin Atis. But her guardian, Anselme, wants to marry her himself and is holding Argie captive along with her friend Nérine. Nérine tries to charm their jailor, Orcan, into releasing them. Atis and his fellow paladins arrive disguised as pilgrims; he intends to carry Argie away with him on a pilgrimage of love. He easily overcomes Orcan, but at this moment, Anselme returns.

=== Act 2 ===
Scene: A hamlet near Anselme's castle
Orcan warns Anselme about the pilgrims. Argie confesses her love for Atis to Anselme. Anselme pretends that he will give her his blessing, but once she has left, he tells Orcan to kill her. Orcan is reluctant and Nérine, realising Anselme's plan, again distracts him by pretending she is in love with him. The band of paladins, disguised as demons, give Orcan a beating.

=== Act 3 ===
Scene: The same as Act 2
The paladins are celebrating their success when Anselme appears with a group of armed followers. Argie, Atis and their friends take refuge in the castle, which Anselme then besieges. They are saved by the fairy Manto, whom Atis once rescued. Manto magically transforms the castle into a superb palace and uses this luxury to help seduce Anselme. Argie can now point to Anselme's infidelity and he admits defeat. Argie and Atis are reunited and the opera ends with a celebration of their love.

== Recordings ==
- Les Paladins Neue Düsseldorfer Hofmusik, conducted by Konrad Junghänel (2 CDS, Coviello Classics, 2013)
- Les Paladins Les Arts Florissants, conducted by William Christie (2 DVDs, Opus Arte, 2005)
- Suite Les Paladins Orchestra of the Age of Enlightenment, Gustav Leonhardt (1 CD, Philips, 1992) Suite edited by R. Peter Wolf, played on original instruments
