= Les fêtes de Ramire =

Opera by Jean-Philippe Rameau

- Opera by Jean-Philippe Rameau
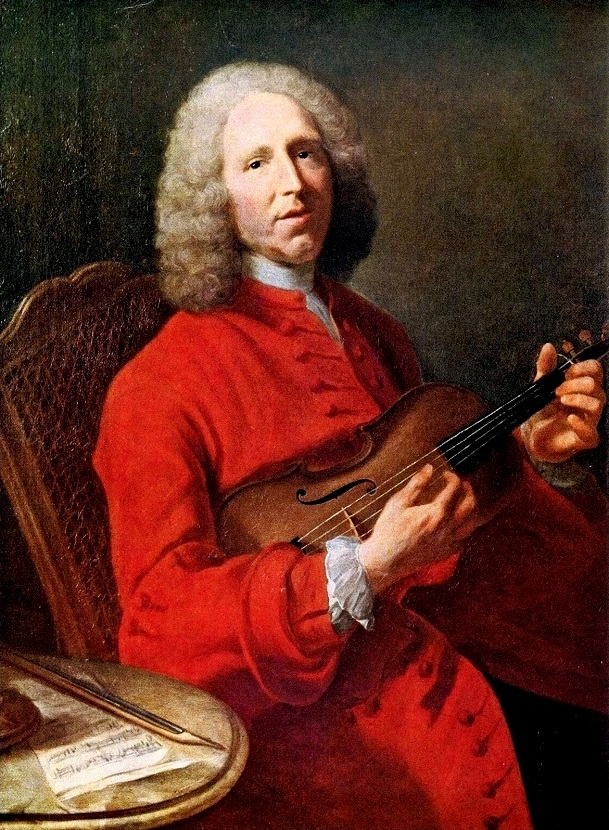
- Portrait of Rameau by Jacques Aved, c. 1728
- Librettist: Voltaire
- Language: French
- Premiere: 22 December 1745; Palace of Versailles

Les fêtes de Ramire (The Celebrations of Ramiro) is an opera in the form of a one-act acte de ballet by Jean-Philippe Rameau with a libretto by Voltaire, first performed on 22 December 1745 at the Palace of Versailles.

Voltaire wrote a new libretto to make use of music taken from his and Rameau's comédie-ballet La princesse de Navarre, which had been performed earlier in 1745. Since both Rameau and Voltaire were busy writing a new opera, Le temple de la Gloire, the Duke of Richelieu entrusted the job of fitting the music to the new libretto and adjusting the verse accordingly to Jean-Jacques Rousseau. Rousseau, who had not yet won his reputation as a major thinker, was an aspiring musician. In his later autobiographical Confessions, Rousseau wrote he had worked hard on the task but Madame de la Pouplinière, Richelieu's mistress and an ardent champion of Rameau, rejected his efforts out of hand and sent the opera back to Rameau to revise.

Rousseau claimed he was responsible for the overture and some recitatives, but that Rameau and Voltaire had stolen all the credit. However, according to the musicologist Graham Sadler, only one "undistinguished" monologue "O mort, viens terminer les douleurs de ma vie" has been positively identified as Rousseau's. Nevertheless, the episode sowed the seeds for Rousseau's unrelenting hatred of Rameau, which would lead to the Querelle des Bouffons in the 1750s.

== Roles ==
Role	Voice type (Note: According to the clefs used in the manuscript score.)	Premiere Cast (Note: According to the original libretto.)
Ramire, the son of Alphonse, King of Castile	haute-contre	François Poirier
Fatime, princess of Granada	soprano	Mlle Rotisset de Romainville
Isbé, Fatime's confidante	soprano	Mlle Jaquet
A warrior	haute-contre	Pierre Jélyotte
Another warrior	basse-taille	François Le Page
A fortuneteller	baritone (Note: The part of a fortune teller (un devin) is initially notated in the unusual baritone clef, and later in the bass clef.)	Claude-Louis-Dominique Chassé de Chinais
The Charites	sopranos	Marie Fel, Marie-Angélique Coupée, Louise Gondré
A male retainer of Ramire	basse-taille	M Albert
A female retainer of Ramire	soprano	Mlle Bourbonnois
Chorus: Warriors; male and female fortune tellers and Gypsies; Cupids, Pleasures and Sports; retinue of Ramire

== Instrumentation ==
- Woodwinds: flutes, oboes, bassoons
- Brass: horns, trumpets
- Percussion: timpani
- Strings: first violins, second violins, violas, cellos and double basses
- Basso continuo (double bass and harpsichord)
- Musettes

== Synopsis ==
Scene: A prison

The Spanish king Alphonse has taken Fatime, Princess of Granada, captive after killing her father. In prison, Fatime longs for death (Air: O mort viens terminer les douleurs de ma vie) but her confidante Isbé tries to comfort her with the hope that Alphonse's son Ramire is not as cruel. There is a sound of trumpets and the scene changes to an "agreeable place". Warriors tell Fatime that Cupid is on her side and fortune tellers predict a bright future. Isbé is now convinced that Ramire is in love with Fatime but the latter is still fearful until the prince finally appears in person and pledges his faith to her during another divertissement involving the Graces, Cupids, Pleasures and Games. Fatime is at last won over.
