= La princesse de Navarre =

1745 ballet by Voltaire

- Comédie-ballet by Jean-Philippe Rameau
- Title page
- Librettist: Voltaire
- Language: French
- Premiere: 23 February 1745; Palace of Versailles

La princesse de Navarre (The Princess of Navarre) is a comédie-ballet by Voltaire, with music by Jean-Philippe Rameau, first performed on 23 February 1745 at La Grande Ecurie, Versailles.

== Performance history ==
It was commissioned to celebrate the marriage of the Infanta Maria Teresa Rafaela of Spain to Louis, Dauphin of France. La princesse de Navarre opened the wedding festivities, while another new Rameau opera, Platée, closed them. The piece takes the form of a comédie-ballet, effectively a play with a large amount of incidental music, recalling the collaborations of Molière and Lully in the 17th century.

Voltaire was a great admirer of Rameau, even considering him too good a composer for such a task. Nevertheless, Rameau wrote around an hour of music for the play, including an overture and three divertissements (musical interludes which ended each act). Little of it has much bearing on the main action of the drama which concerns the complicated love life of the eponymous mediaeval princess. Voltaire found Rameau to be a demanding and critical collaborator, leading the dramatist to declare: "Poor Rameau is mad...Rameau is as great an eccentric as he is a musician". The production was a spectacular one, involving no less than 180 "extras". Voltaire complained about the acoustics of the hall in which it was staged claiming "the ceiling was so high that the actors appeared pygmies and they couldn't be heard". Nevertheless, the music was a critical success. Much of the material was reworked to produce another opera, Les fêtes de Ramire, later the same year.

== Roles ==
Source: Oeuvres complètes de Voltaire, Théatre, ninth tome, Société Littéraire-typographique, 1784 (digitalized by Google) (accessed 21 October 2010)

=== Singing characters ===
Fifteen women and twenty-five men

=== Characters of the comedy ===
- Constance, Princess of Navarre
- The Duke of Foix / Alamir
- Dom Morillo, a country gentleman
- Sanchette, Morillo's daughter
- Leonor, the princess's maid
- Hernand, the squire of the Duke
- An officer of the guards
- An alcalde
- A gardener
- Followers

== Synopsis ==
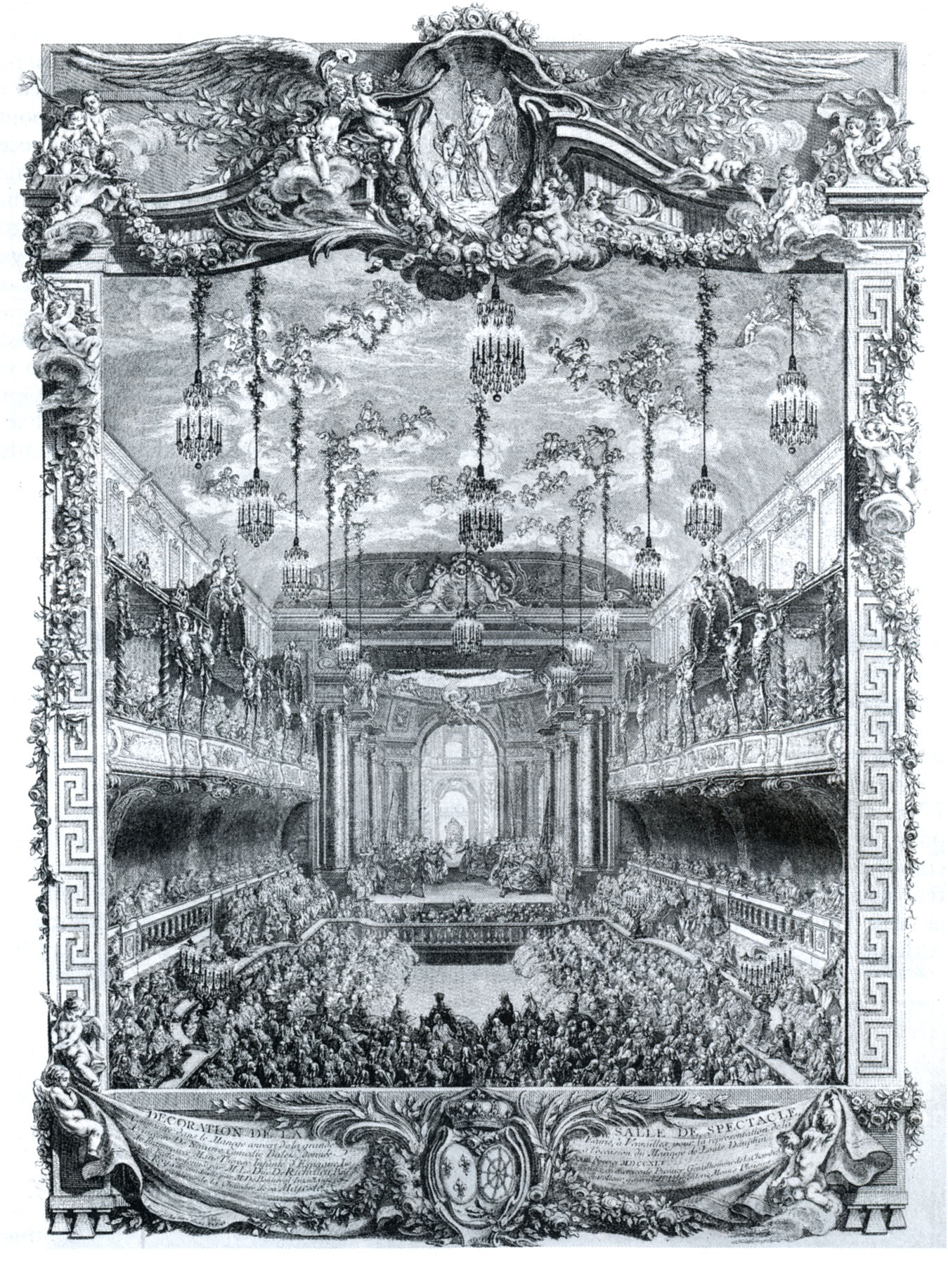
Premiere of La princesse de Navarre, engraving by Charles-Nicolas Cochin.

=== Act 1 ===
Don Pedro, King of Castile, has taken captive Constance, Princess of Navarre. She manages to escape from prison in disguise and takes refuge with Don Morillo, but she is recognised by the young Alamir. Alamir falls in love with Constance and rejects Don Morillo's daughter Sanchette. The act ends with a divertissement in which warriors, gypsies and astrologers entertain the lords and ladies.

=== Act 2 ===
The king demands the return of Constance but Alamir vows to protect her. Alamir's army, in alliance with the French, defeats the Castilians. Constance feels herself falling more and more in love with Alamir but she is reluctant to hurt Sanchette and sees Alamir's lack of noble birth as a barrier to their union. The Graces distract her from her cares with a divertissement.

=== Act 3 ===
Alamir returns from battle in triumph and reveals his true identity as the Duke of Foix. He and Constance can now marry and the play ends with a divertissement led by Cupid against the backdrop of the Pyrenees.

== Recordings ==
- La princesse de Navarre English Bach Festival Chorus and Orchestra, Nicholas McGegan (1 CD, Erato, 1980)

== Sources ==
- Girdlestone, Cuthbert Jean-Philippe Rameau: His Life and Work Dover paperback edition, 1969
- Holden, Amanda (Ed.), The New Penguin Opera Guide, New York: Penguin Putnam, 2001. ISBN 0-14-029312-4
- Sadler, Graham (Ed.), The New Grove French Baroque Masters Grove/Macmillan, 1988
- Sawkins, Lionel, Booklet notes to the McGegan recording
