= Louis-François Beffara =

French writer

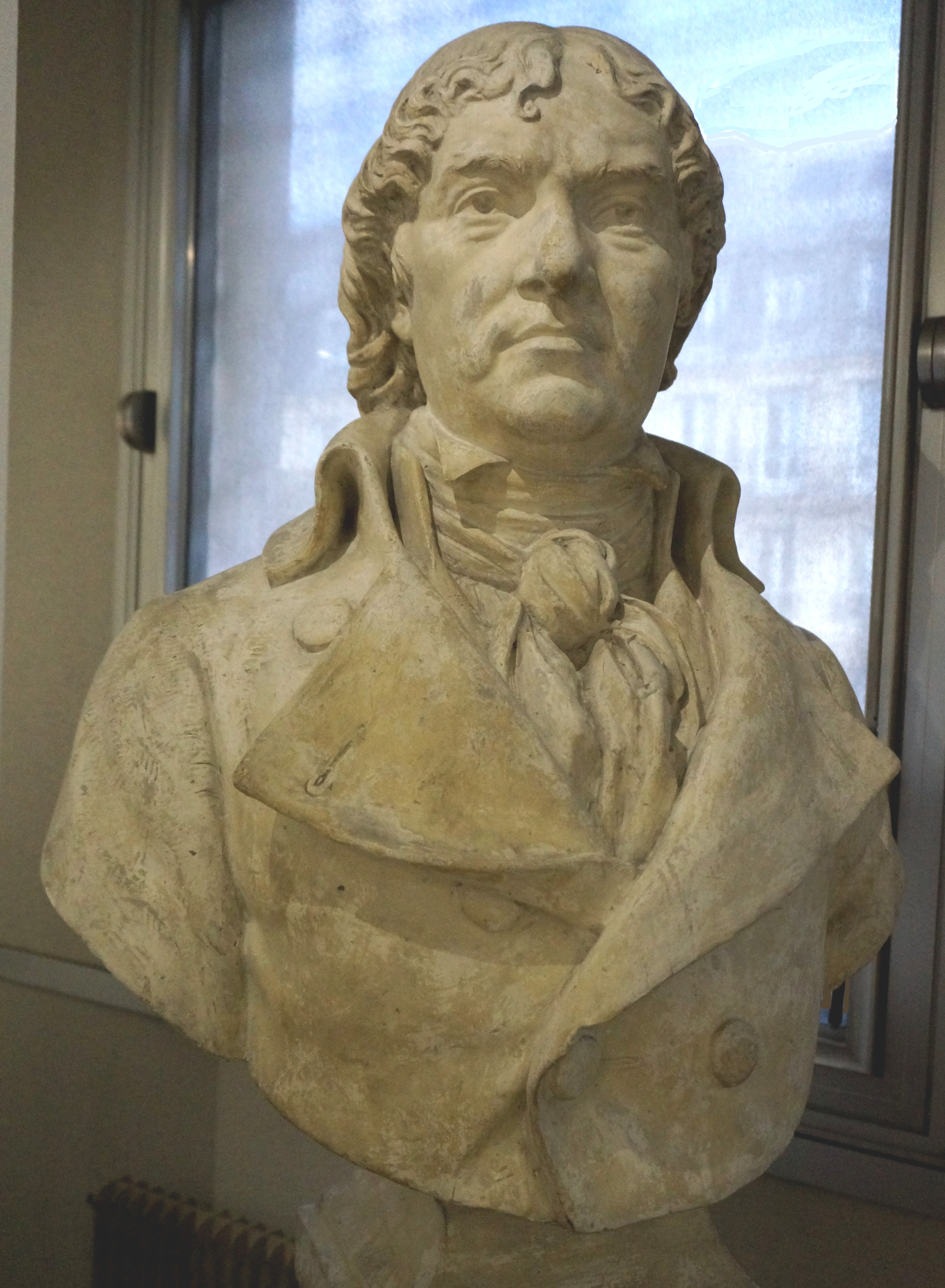
- Bust of Beffara at musée de la Police de Paris.
- Born: 23 August 1751; Nonancourt
- Died: 2 February 1838 (aged 86); Paris
- Occupation(s): Commissaire de police Writer

Louis-François Beffara (23 August 1751 – 2 February 1838) was a French writer.

A commissaire de police in Paris from 1792 to 1816, he bequeathed the Bibliothèque nationale de France his manuscripts regarding opera houses in France and abroad.

== Selected works ==
- 1777: Esprit de Molière, ou choix de maximes et portraits… tirés de ses ouvrages, 2 vol.
- 1821: Dissertation sur J. B. Poquelin de Molière
- 1835: Maison natale de Molière
