= Adrien-Joseph Le Valois d'Orville =

French librettist

Adrien-Joseph le Valois d'Orville, real name Adrien Joseph de Valois, (paroisse Notre Dame des Champs in Paris, 8 June 1715 – 1780) was an 18th-century French librettist. The son of Adrien de Valois and Marie Suzanne Durand de Linois, he married Geneviève Chapelon with whom he had two children, Alexis et Victor.

He wrote several parodies of operas and tragedies, mainly for the Théâtre de la foire and the Opéra-Comique.

He is mostly known for his adaptation of the libretto of Platée, opera by Jean-Philippe Rameau who had acquired the rights from its original author, Jacques Autreau.
