= Jean-François Duplat de Monticourt =

French librettist

Jean-François Duplat de Monticourt (1710 or 1711 – 4 August 1772 in Grenoble) was an 18th-century French opera librettist.

Next to nothing is known about this author who is attributed the libretto of Les Paladins, one the last works by Rameau (1760). The plot is taken from a tale by La Fontaine, Le Petit Chien qui secoue de l'argent et des pierreries.

"This nonsense can come out only from the hand of a man who has not the first notion of drama, and who never made verse; and I will not fear to assert that the defunct Cahusac is a second Quinault compared with the prank that ruined the words of this libretto." Such is the unflattering appraisal of Charles Collé in respect to one of the worst librettists Rameau had, who however wasn't short of them.

Duplat de Monticourt also translated the drama The Gamester by James Shirley, a play which was also translated into French in 1760 by Diderot.
