= Comédie-ballet =

Genre of French drama

Comédie-ballet is a Baroque genre of French drama which mixes a spoken play with interludes containing music and dance.

== History ==
The first example of the genre is considered to be Les fâcheux, with words by Molière, performed in honour of Louis XIV at Vaux-le-Vicomte, the residence of Nicolas Fouquet, in 1661. The music and choreography were by Pierre Beauchamp, but Jean-Baptiste Lully later contributed a sung courante for Act I, scene 3. Molière, Lully and Beauchamp collaborated on several more examples of comédie-ballet, culminating in the masterpiece of the genre, Le Bourgeois gentilhomme, in 1670, and the scenically spectacular Psyché of January 1671, a tragicomédie et ballet which went well beyond the earlier examples of the genre.

After quarrelling with Lully, Molière retained the services of Beauchamp as choreographer. His one-act prose comedy La Comtesse d'Escarbagnas premiered in December 1671 at the Château de Saint-Germain-en-Laye as part of a larger entertainment referred to as the "Ballet des Ballets". The play recycled musical episodes from several of Molière's earlier comédies-ballets, including La pastorale comique, George Dandin, Le Bourgeois gentilhomme, and Psyché. It "has sometimes been characterized as little more than a platform for songs and dances."

Molière turned to the composer Marc-Antoine Charpentier for the music for Le Malade imaginaire in 1673. While performing in Le Malade imaginaire, Molière was taken ill on stage and died shortly afterwards.

In the 18th century, the comédie-ballet became almost completely outmoded but it still exercised a long-lasting influence on the use of music in French theatre. A late example of a genuine comédie-ballet is La princesse de Navarre by Voltaire, which was performed at Versailles on 23 February 1745. It consisted of a prologue and three acts, with the addition of an overture and three musical divertissements, one per act, composed by Jean-Philippe Rameau. The vocal music is particularly difficult to sing and includes a virtuoso duet for hautes-contre.

== Comédie-ballet and comédie lyrique ==
Even though scholars tend to limit the use of the term comédie-ballet to the form described above, in the 18th century some authors also applied it to other kinds of stage work, particularly a type of comic opera, usually in three or four acts, without spoken dialogue. This differed from opéra-ballet (another genre mixing opera and dance) in that it contained a continuous plot (rather than a different plot for each act) as well as frequently having comic or satirical elements. It was essentially the same as the comédie lyrique. Examples include Le carnaval et la folie (1703) by André Cardinal Destouches and La vénitienne (1768) by Antoine Dauvergne, a late reworking of the 1705 ballet of the same name by Michel de la Barre. A completely different use of the term comédie-lyrique as a sort of modern revival of the comédie-ballet is Le piège de Méduse (1913) by Erik Satie, which is a play in one act with seven short dances originally composed for the piano.

== List of comédies-ballets ==
=== Comédies-ballets created by Molière-Lully-Beauchamp ===
- Les fâcheux (1661)
- La pastorale comique (1667)
- Le Sicilien (1667)
- L'Amour médecin (1665)
- George Dandin (1668)
- Monsieur de Pourceaugnac (1669)
- Les amants magnifiques (1670)
- Le Bourgeois gentilhomme (1670)
- Psyché (1671)
- La Comtesse d'Escarbagnas (1671)

=== Comédie-ballet created by Molière-Charpentier-Beauchamp ===
- Le Malade imaginaire (1673)

=== Comédie-ballet created by Voltaire and Rameau ===
- La Princesse de Navarre (1745)
