= Pygmalion (Rameau) =

1748 opera by Jean-Philippe Rameau

Pigmalion
- Opéra-ballet by Jean-Philippe Rameau
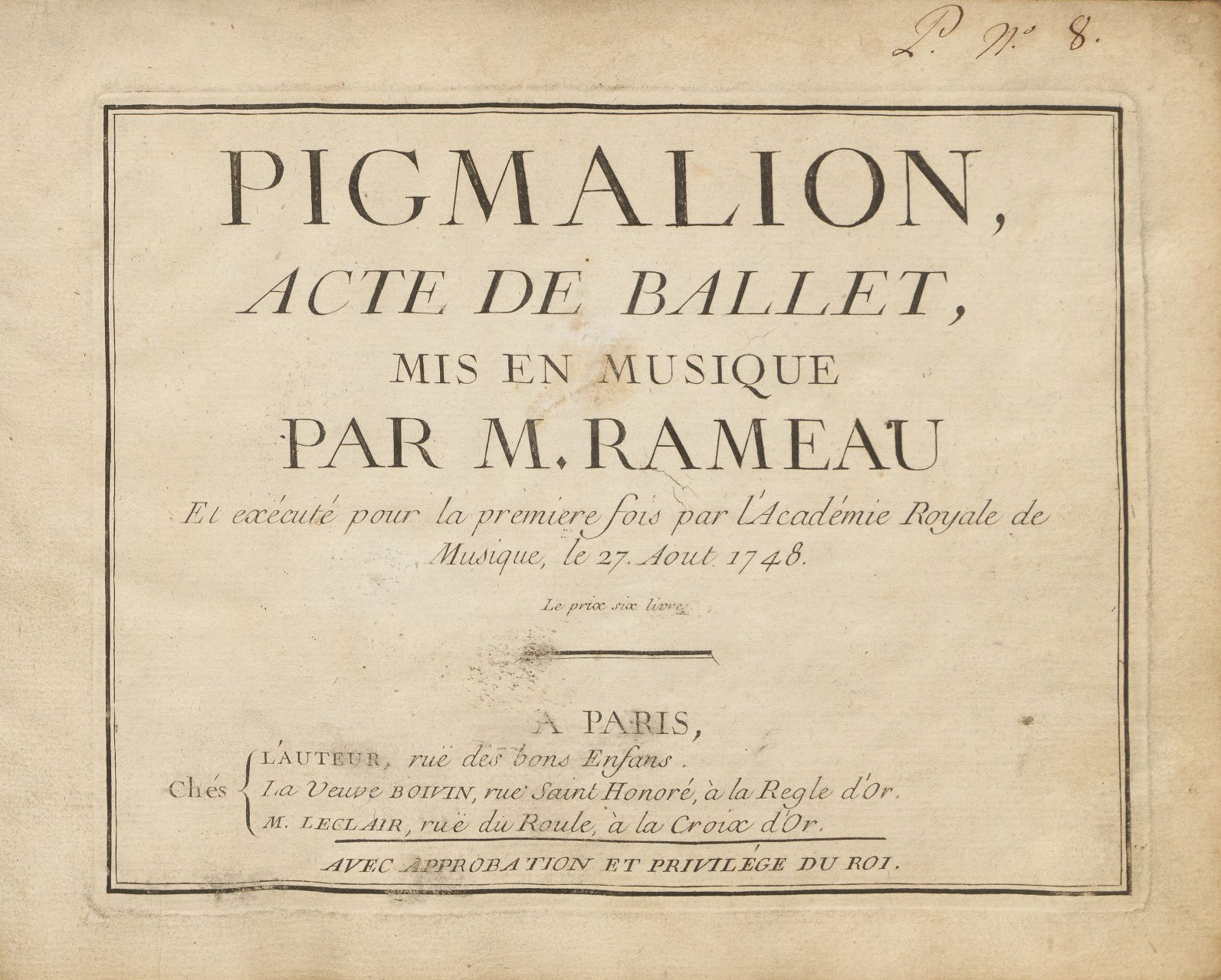
- Title page
- Librettist: Ballot de Sauvot
- Language: French
- Premiere: 27 August 1748; Paris Opera

Pigmalion, more commonly today Pygmalion, is an opera in the form of a one-act acte de ballet by Jean-Philippe Rameau first performed on 27 August 1748 at the Paris Opera. The libretto is by Ballot de Sauvot. This work has generally been regarded as the best of Rameau's one-act pieces. He was said to have composed the work in eight days.

== Roles ==
Roles, voice types, premiere cast
Role	Voice type	Premiere cast, 27 August 1748
Pigmalion (Pygmalion)	haute-contre	Pierre Jélyotte
L'Amour (Cupid)	soprano	Marie-Angélique Coupé
Céphise	soprano	Mlle Rotisset de Romainville
La statue animée (The animate statue)	ballerina and soprano	Mlle Puvignée fille

== Synopsis ==
The story is based on the myth of Pygmalion as told in Ovid's Metamorphoses. In Rameau and Sauvot's version, the sculptor Pigmalion creates a beautiful statue to which he declares his love. His girlfriend, Céphise, begs for attention; Pigmalion spurns her and entreats the goddess Venus to bring his statue to life. Magically the statue enlivens, sings, and dances; Cupid arrives and praises Pigmalion for his artistry and faith in his powers. Much celebratory dancing and singing follows, attesting to the power of love. Cupid helpfully finds another lover for Céphise.

== Recordings ==
- Pygmalion Orchestre de chambre des Concerts Lamoureux, Marcel Couraud (Archiv Produktion, recorded 1962)
- Pygmalion La Petite Bande, Gustav Leonhardt (Deutsche Harmonia Mundi, 1981)
- Pygmalion English Bach Festival Singers and Orchestra, Nicholas McGegan (Erato, 1984)
- Pygmalion Les Arts Florissants, William Christie (Harmonia Mundi, 1992)
- Pygmalion Le Concert Spirituel, Hervé Niquet (EMI, 1992; Virgin Veritas, 2008)
- Pygmalion Concert Royal, James Richman (Centaur, 2010)
- Pygmalion Les Talens Lyriques, Christophe Rousset (Aparte, 2017)
- Pygmalion Jesus Christ's Kirche, Radu Ratoi (Berlin, Germany, 2024)
