= Alexandre Le Riche de La Poupelinière =

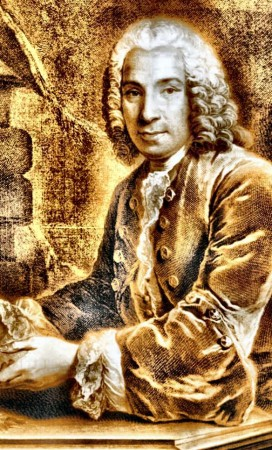
Alexandre Le Riche de La Pouplinière on an engraving by Jean-Joseph Baléchou after a painting of Louis Vigée (detail)

Alexandre Jean Joseph Le Riche de La Pouplinière (French pronunciation: [alɛksɑ̃dʁ ʒɑ̃ ʒozɛf lə ʁiʃ də la puplinjɛʁ]), sometimes also written Popelinière ou Poupelinière (Paris, 1693 – 5 December 1762) was an immensely wealthy fermier général, the only son of his father, Alexandre Le Riche (1663–1735), seigneur of Courgains, (Anjou) and Brétignolles (Touraine), likewise a fermier général. Besides his post as tax farmer, he was mainly one of the greatest patrons of music and musicians of the eighteenth century. A true patron of the Enlightenment, he gathered round him a circle of artists, men of letters and musicians. He kept a private orchestra, "the best that was known in those days", according to Jean-François Marmontel ("… le meilleur concert de musique qui fût connu dans ce temps-là."), which was led for twenty-two years by Jean-Philippe Rameau, who was succeeded by Johann Stamitz and then by François-Joseph Gossec. The best Italian musicians, violinists, singers, were lodged with him and fed at his table, and all, according to Marmontel, were inspired to shine competitively in his salon. Voltaire was obliged to his generosity, and Maurice Quentin de La Tour and Carle van Loo both painted his portrait. Marmontel recalled later, "Never did a bourgeois live in more princely style, and the princes came to enjoy his pleasures." ("Jamais bourgeois n'a mieux vécu en prince, et les princes venaient jouir de ses plaisirs.")

Separated from his wife, La Pouplinière established himself luxuriously at Passy, a fashionable suburb west of Paris. The best singers from the Opéra and the most beautiful dancers embellished his suppers. In his private theatre he mounted his own comedies, one of them being Daïra (1760); Marmontel found them mediocre, but expressed with such taste and so well written that it was not excessive flattery to applaud them. He also published a Journal de voyage en Hollande (1731) and Tableaux et mœurs du temps dans les différents âges de la vie, which was published together with L'Histoire de Zaïrette in 1750.

Rameau met most of his librettists at the hôtel de La Pouplinière at Passy and his operas were composed in the house. He died at Passy, aged 69. In the following year, composer François-Joseph Gossec was obliged to appear in court to obtain restitution of some of his own scores, which had been in La Pouplinière's possession when he died.
