= Querelle des Bouffons =

1752–1754 battle of musical philosophies

The Querelle des Bouffons ("Quarrel of the Comic Actors"), also known as the Guerre des Bouffons ("War of the Comic Actors"), was the name given to a battle of musical philosophies that took place in Paris between 1752 and 1754. The controversy concerned the relative merits of French and Italian opera. It was also known as the Guerre des Coins ("War of the Corners"), with those favoring French opera in the King's corner, and those favoring Italian opera in the Queen's corner.

It was sparked by the reaction of literary Paris to a performance of Giovanni Battista Pergolesi's short intermezzo La serva padrona at the Académie royale de musique in Paris on 1 August 1752. La serva padrona was performed by an itinerant Italian troupe of comic actors, known as buffoni (bouffons in French, hence the name of the quarrel). In the controversy that followed, critics such as Jean-Jacques Rousseau and Friedrich Melchior Grimm, along with other writers associated with the Encyclopédie, praised Italian opera buffa. They attacked French lyric tragedy, a style originated by Jean-Baptiste Lully and promoted by such French composers as Jean-Philippe Rameau.

== Beginning of the quarrel ==
In France in the middle of the eighteenth century, the genre of "comic ballet" (such as Rameau's Platée) was starting to acquire comic elements, while the genre of opéra bouffon was starting to produce a type of original comedy that was closer to farce and commedia dell'arte. Comedy at the Royal Academy of Music (Académie royale de musique, the future Paris Opera) was usually limited to tragédie lyrique or tragédie en musique. For something light, audiences went to the Comédie-Française, which would alternate tragedies with comedies and the farces of Molière.

In Italy, this evolution proceeded more rapidly, until opera split into two distinct genres. One of the genres was "serious opera" (opera seria) with serious themes from librettos by Apostolo Zeno and Metastasio. The other was comic opera (opera buffa, from buffo— "to laugh", "grotesque", "farce”) with comic interludes marked with lightness, innocence, simplicity, irrationality, and the triviality of daily life.

It was against this background that the arrival, in 1752, of La serva padrona at the Royal Academy of Music triggered a culture war among Parisian intelligentsia.

The quarrel broke out on August 1, 1752, when Eustachio Bambini's Italian touring company arrived in Paris to give performances of intermezzi and opera buffa. They opened with a performance of Pergolesi's La serva padrona (The Servant Turned Mistress). This work had been given in Paris before (in 1746) without attracting any attention. But this time it was performed at the Royal Academy of Music and it created a scandal. People were shocked, and supporters of French tragédie lyrique squared off against supporters of Italian opéra bouffon in a dispute carried out through the medium of pamphlets.

== The pamphlet war ==
In 1753 Jean-Jacques Rousseau published a pamphlet (Letter on French Music), boosting La serva; and at the end of the year, he published it in an engraved edition to disseminate an uncorrupted text. Both versions would weigh heavily in the reception of the work.

But without insisting on the tragic duets, a kind of music that we do not know in Paris, I can give you a comic duet that is known to everyone there, and I mention it boldly as a model of singing, unity of melody, dialogue, and taste, which I believe will lack nothing, when it will be well executed to audiences who know how to listen: this is the first act of La serva padrona, Lo conosco a quegl'occhietti, etc. I confess that French musicians are in a state of feeling beauty, and I would willingly say of Pergolesi, as Cicero said of Homer, that he has already made a lot of artistic progress, so that one enjoys reading it. – Extract of Letter on French Music, by Jean-Jacques Rousseau

After praising Italian music, he harshly condemned the French.

I believe to have been made to see that there is neither measure nor melody in French music, because the language is not sensitive; that French singing is only continual barking, unbearable to all unprejudiced ears; that the harmony is brutal, without expression and feeling uniquely like schoolboys' padding; that French airs are not airs; that French recitals are not recitals. Hence I conclude that the French have no music and can have none; or that if ever they have, so much the worse for them. – Jean-Jacques Rousseau, Œuvres complètes, Volume 10, p. 318

French mathematician Louis Bertrand Castel responded this way.

A nation like the French, whose unity has been so perfect for at least 1,200 years, even under the unity of a great empire does not willingly suffer superiority too marked, too pronounced, of any nation who has everything, neither for this range nor for this number, neither this ancient time nor this homeland.

It can be argued that the quarrel represented a defense of French cultural and behavioral norms against an invasion by foreign (Italian) norms. In the approximately forty pamphlets published during the quarrel, one repeatedly finds the Italian taste for passion and emotion being rejected. French cultural preferences disliked comic opera for the laughter that it provoked; laughter that signalled loss of self-control and rationality. Italian operatic language tended to favor music and singing, while the French preference was more for the spoken word.

== Outcome of the quarrel ==
French public taste gradually became more accepting of Italian comedy, and the controversy burned out after two years.

As early as October 1752 Rousseau presented Le devin du village (The Village Soothsayer) at Fontainebleau, and in 1753 in Paris. It was similar to the light opera being performed by the bouffons, but no one at court was shocked, possibly because Madame de Pompadour herself played the role of Colin.

In 1754 Jean-Philippe Rameau presented a new version of his opera Castor and Pollux, that was quite successful, with 40 performances in 1754 and 1755. Graham Sadler writes that "It was ... Castor et Pollux that was regarded as Rameau's crowning achievement, at least from the time of its first revival (1754) onwards."

The effect of the quarrel was to open French opera to outside influences that triggered a renewal in the form. In particular, the Comédie-Italienne and Théâtre de la foire developed a new type of opera that combined the natural simplicity of the Italian style with the harmonic richness of French tragédie en musique.

== Sources ==
- Pitou, Spire (1985). The Paris Opera: An Encyclopedia of Operas, Ballets, Composers, and Performers. Rococo and Romantic, 1715–1815. Westport, Connecticut: Greenwood Press. ISBN 9780313243943.
- Girdlestone, Cuthbert, Jean-Philippe Rameau: His Life and Work, New York: Dover Publications, 1969 ISBN 0-486-21416-8
- Parker, Roger C. (ed), The Oxford Illustrated History of Opera New York: Oxford University Press, 1994 ISBN 0-19-816282-0
