= Platée =

1745 opera by Jean-Philippe Rameau

- Opera by Jean-Philippe Rameau
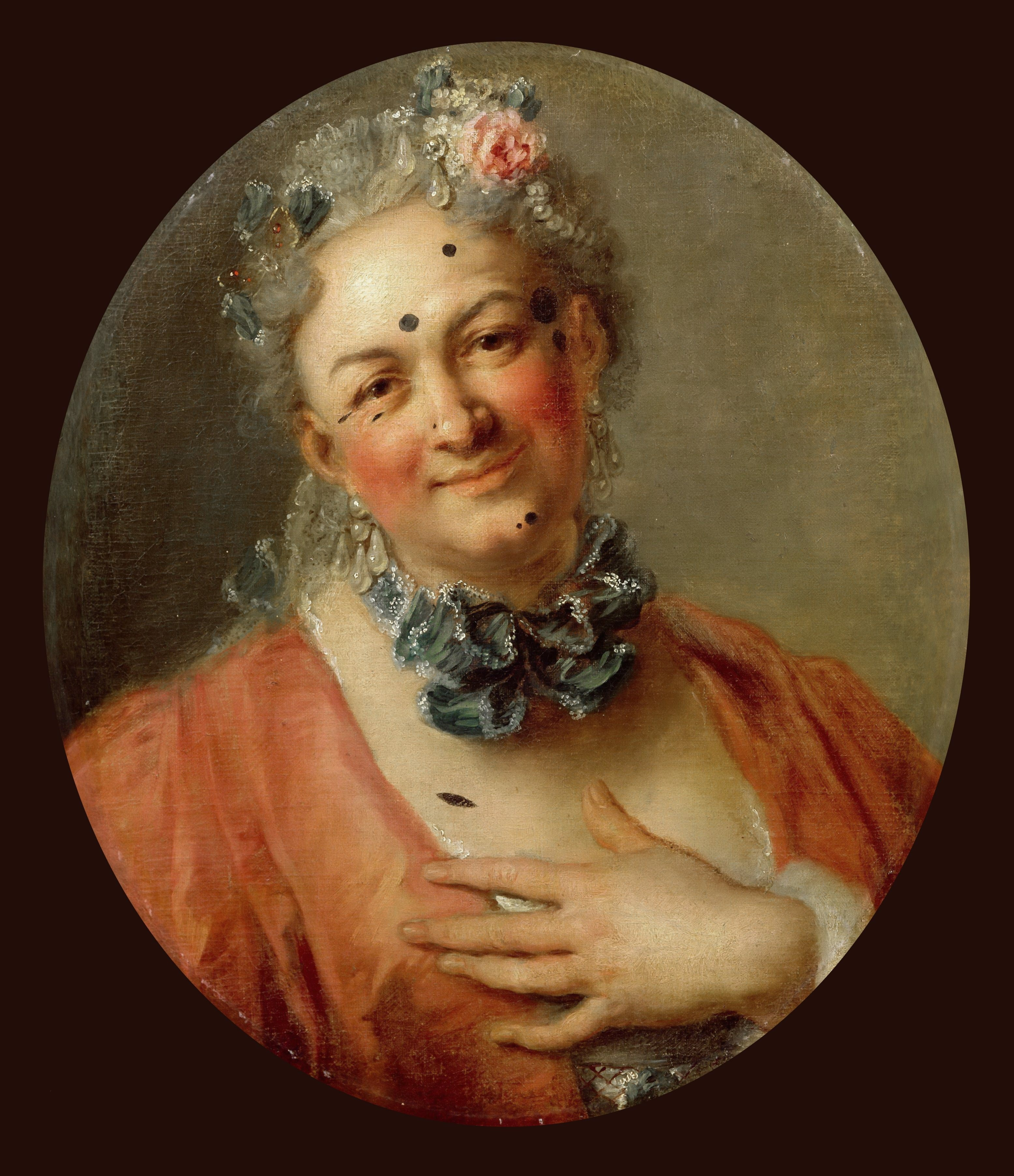
- Pierre Jélyotte who created the title role, painted in the role by Charles-Antoine Coypel
- Librettist: Adrien-Joseph Le Valois d'Orville
- Language: French
- Based on: libretto Platée ou Junon jalouse
- Premiere: 31 March 1745; Palace of Versailles

Platée is an opera in a prologue and three acts by Jean-Philippe Rameau with a libretto by Adrien-Joseph Le Valois d'Orville. Rameau bought the rights to the libretto Platée ou Junon jalouse (Plataea, or Juno Jealous) by Jacques Autreau (1657–1745) and had d'Orville modify it. The ultimate source of the story is a myth related by the Greek writer Pausanias in his Guide to Greece.

Rameau's first attempt at comic opera, the plot concerns an ugly water nymph who believes that Jupiter, the king of the gods, is in love with her. The work was initially called a ballet bouffon, though it was later styled a comédie lyrique, putting it in the same category as Rameau's Les Paladins. It was written for the celebrations of the wedding of Louis, Dauphin of France, son of King Louis XV, to the Infanta María Teresa Rafaela of Spain, who, according to contemporary sources, like the title character was no beauty. Instead of getting the composer into trouble, the entertainment at Versailles seems to have been well received, and Rameau was appointed a few months later to the position of Composer of the King's Chamber Music with a sizable annual pension.

The opera was first performed on 31 March 1745 at the Grande Écurie, Versailles.

== Background to the opera ==
Comic opera was relatively rare during the Baroque era in France and the musicologist Cuthbert Girdlestone expresses his surprise that none of Rameau's contemporaries seem to have remarked on the innovative nature of Platée. Rameau may have been inspired by a revival of an earlier comic opera, Les amours de Ragonde by Jean-Joseph Mouret, in 1742, or by Joseph Bodin de Boismortier's comic opera-ballet, Don Quichotte chez la Duchesse from 1743.

== Performance history and reception ==
Platée was one of the most highly regarded of Rameau's operas during his lifetime. It even pleased critics who had expressed hostility to his musical style during the Querelle des Bouffons (an argument over the relative merits of French and Italian opera). Melchior Grimm called it a "sublime work" and even Rameau's bitter enemy Jean-Jacques Rousseau referred to it as "divine". The reason for this praise may be because these critics saw Platée, a comic opera, paving the way for the lighter form of opera buffa they favoured. Voltaire however, who was in the audience in Versailles, wrote to his niece, "You didn't miss much except a large crowd and a very bad work. It is the height of indecency, boredom, and impertinence."

The work received one performance at the marriage festivities at Versailles in 1745. Little is known about this production, except that the title role was taken by the haute-contre Pierre Jélyotte, a famous character actor and the leading tenor of the Académie Royale de Musique. Rameau revised the opera in collaboration with the librettist Ballot de Sauvot and presented it at the Opéra in Paris on 9 February 1749. Its first public run was very successful and it was later revived in 1750 and again in 1754, always starring in the title role the second leading haute-contre of the Opéra, Jean-Paul Spesoller, called La Tour. According to Rodolfo Celletti, the role of Platée performed by La Tour was the highest haute-contre part ever written by Rameau. The 1754 revival was part of the continuing Querelle des Bouffons, pitted against Leonardo Leo's Italian opera buffa, I viaggiatori. Platée was last performed complete during Rameau's lifetime in 1759.

The next production would not take place until 1901 in Munich, in a heavily adapted German version by Hans Schilling-Ziemssen. The French version reappeared at a production in Monte Carlo in 1917 but Platée only returned to France at the Aix-en-Provence Festival in 1956 with young tenor Michel Sénéchal as the queen of frogs, a part which Sénéchal took again in the revival presented by the Paris Opera at the Salle Favart in 1977, with Michel Plasson as conductor. The opera made its debut in the Netherlands in 1968, in the United Kingdom in 1983 and in the United States in 1987. The London performances, in a production by the English Bach Festival at Sadler's Wells, conducted by Jean-Claude Malgoire, featured Jean-Claude Orliac in the title role, with Henry Herford, Peter Jeffes and Marilyn Hill Smith.

Platée appeared again at the Salle Favart in 1989 with Jean-Claude Malgoire as conductor, and in 1999 it was staged at the Palais Garnier in Paris in a production by Laurent Pelly that was later released on DVD, with Jean-Paul Fouchécourt, then Paul Agnew, in the title part, conducted by Marc Minkowski. The opera was also presented as a co-production of New York City Opera and the Mark Morris Dance Group, directed by Mark Morris during the 1997 Edinburgh Festival, a production that then toured to London and the USA. The opera was also staged by the Santa Fe Opera as part of the Summer 2007 Festival season in an adaptation of the Paris Opera production also directed by Laurent Pelly, with many of the same production team, and conducted by Harry Bicket. In 2014 Platée had a new production at Vienna's Theater an der Wien and Paris' Opéra-Comique conducted by Paul Agnew and directed by Robert Carsen. Its first performance in Australia was by Pinchgut Opera in Sydney, directed by Neil Armfield, conducted by Erin Helyard, with Kanen Breen in the title role, Cheryl Barker as Juno and her husband, Peter Coleman-Wright, as Jupiter. In 2023, the Zürich Opera House featured a new production of the opera staged by Jetske Mijnssen and conducted by Emmanuelle Haïm, with cast including Mathias Vidal, Evan Hughes, Katia Ledoux, Renato Dolcini and Alasdair Kent.

== Roles ==
Role	Voice type	Premiere cast, 31 March 1745	2nd version cast, 9 February 1749
Prologue: La Naissance de la comédie / The birth of the Comedy
Thespis, inventor of comedy	haute-contre (high tenor)	Jean-Paul Spesoller, generally known as La Tour or Latour	François Poirier
Momus	bass-baritone	Albert (Note: First name unknown)	Lamarre (also spelled La Marre)
Thalie	soprano	Marie Fel	Marie-Angélique Coupé
Amour/Cupid (travesti role)	soprano	Marie-Angélique Coupé (also spelled Couppé or Coupée)	M.lle Rosalie
Un satire/a satyr	bass-baritone	Benoit	Person
Vendangeuses/ Vintaging girls	sopranos	M.lles Cartou and Dalman	M.lles Cartou and Marie-Madeleine Jendrest, m.lle Chefdeville
Ballet (comédie lyrique)
Cithéron/Cithaeron, King of Greece	bass-baritone	François Le Page (also spelled Lepage)	François Le Page
Mercure/ Mercury	haute-contre	Jean Antoine Bérard	François Poirier
Platée, nymph of a large marsh at the foot of Mount Cithaeron (travesti role)	haute-contre	Pierre Jélyotte	La Tour (Jean-Paul Spesoller)
Clarine, a fountain, maidservant to Platée	soprano	M.lle Bourbonnais	Marie-Angélique Coupé
Une naiade/ a naiad, another maidservant to Platée	soprano	M.lle Metz	?
Jupiter	bass-baritone	Claude-Louis-Dominique Chassé de Chinais	Person
La Folie/ Folly	soprano	Marie Fel	Marie Fel
Junon/ Juno	soprano	Marie-Jeanne Fesch, "m.lle Chevalier	Louise Jacquet
Momus	taille (baritenor) or bass-baritone	Louis-Antoine Cuvillier (also spelled Cuvilliers or Cuvelier)	Lamarre
Iris	mime		?
Animals, scholars, chorus, dancers

== Synopsis ==
=== Prologue ===
After a night of partying, the Chorus wakes Thespis from a drunken sleep. When Thalie and Momus arrive, they seek Thespis' help in planning the presentation of an entertainment in which they will recreate a long-ago attempt by Jupiter to cure his wife, Juno, of her jealousy. Initially left out of the planning, a furious Cupid arrives on the scene and proclaims that it will be impossible to stage the event without him: "how could there be a play without the inspiration of love?" he asks. All four then lay out the plan.

=== Act 1 ===
In the middle of a raging storm, Mercury comes down from the heavens and explains to Citheron that it is caused by Juno's jealousy and that he has been sent by Jupiter to find a way of taking his mind off the problem. Citheron's solution is to propose the enactment of the plan put together by the four conspirators: Jupiter will pretend to fall in love with the ugly marsh nymph, Platée — who is convinced that everything that comes near her pond is madly in love with her — and, when Juno finds them together and about to marry, she will realize that her jealousy is baseless and the couple will be re-united.

After Platée arrives, Mercury leaves to inform Jupiter. While she seems to believe that it is Cithéron who is in love with her — in spite of his denials — she is delighted to hear from Mercury that Jupiter will soon descend from the heavens and declare his love: "The god of thunder, drawn to earth by your beauty, wishes to cast at your feet both his heart and the Universe." A new storm created by Juno bursts forth, but Platée is not put out and the marsh creatures retreat to their watery homes.

=== Act 2 ===
Having sent Juno off to Athens, Mercury and Cithéron find a hiding place to observe the proceedings. Accompanied by Momus, Jupiter arrives, revealing himself first as a donkey (to the accompanying sounds of donkey braying from the orchestra), then as an owl, and finally, in person in a clap of thunder and bright light. An extended divertissment proceeds, including a show-stopping highlight in which La Folie (Madness) sings the story of Apollo and Daphne as a warning to Platée not to get involved with Jupiter. Dancers and singers alternately praise and mock Platée.

=== Act 3 ===
As people arrive for the marriage of Jupiter and Platée, a furious-at-being-tricked Juno has returned from Athens but she is persuaded to hide until the right moment. Momus appears, poorly disguised as Love, and offers "gifts" to Platée. Jupiter and Platée begin to take part in the wedding ceremony, but, stalling after his initial "I swear", he awaits the arrival of Juno. When she finally sees Platée and removes her veil, she realizes that it was all a joke. The gods ascend back to heaven and the humiliated Platée leaps back into the pond.

== Recordings ==
Year	Cast (Platée, La Folie, Thespis/Mercure, Cithéron, Jupiter)	Orchestra, conductor	Label
1956	Michel Sénéchal, Janine Micheau, Nicolai Gedda, Jacques Jansen, Huc Santana	Hans Rosbaud, Orchestre de la Société des Concerts du Conservatoire, Choeurs du Festival d'Aix-en-Provence	CD: EMI; Cat: EMI Pathé Marconi CMS 7 69861-2
1989	Gilles Ragon, Jennifer Smith, Guy de Mey, Bernard Deletré, Vincent Le Texier	Marc Minkowski, Les Musiciens du Louvre	CD: WEA International; Erato 2292 45028-2
2003	Paul Agnew, Mireille Delunsch, Yann Beuron, Laurent Naouri, Vincent Le Texier	Marc Minkowski, Paris Opera, Orchestra and Chorus of Les Musiciens du Louvre – Grenoble	DVD: Kultur; Cat: D2919
