= Les fêtes de Polymnie =

Opéra-ballet by Jean-Philippe Rameau

- Opéra-ballet by Jean-Philippe Rameau
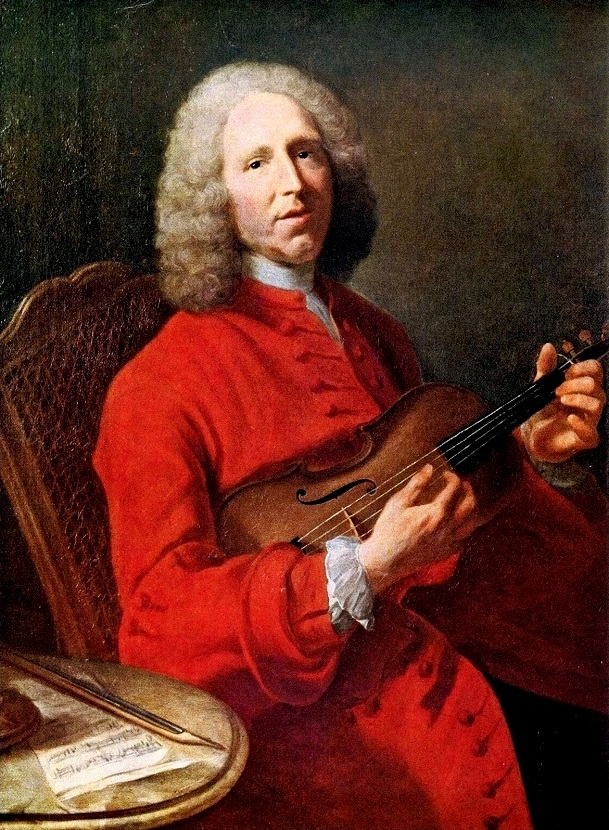
- Portrait of Rameau by Joseph Aved, c. 1728
- Librettist: Louis de Cahusac
- Language: French
- Premiere: 12 October 1745; Paris Opera

Les fêtes de Polymnie (The Festivals of Polyhymnia) is an opéra-ballet in three entrées and a prologue by Jean-Philippe Rameau. The work was first performed on 12 October 1745 at the Opéra in Paris, and is set to a libretto by Louis de Cahusac. The piece was written to celebrate the French victory at the Battle of Fontenoy in the War of the Austrian Succession. It was revived at the same venue on 21 August 1753.

Neither Cuthbert Girdlestone nor Graham Sadler (in the New Penguin Guide) consider this among Rameau's finest works, though both remark on the originality of its overture, which breaks the traditional Lullian mould common to French overtures up to that time.

== Roles ==
Information taken from the site Rameau2014.fr.

Role	Voice type	Premiere Cast
Prologue
Mnémosine	soprano	Marie-Jeanne Chevalier
La Victoire (Victory)	soprano	Mlle Rotisset de Romainville
Polymnie (Polyhymnia)	soprano	Bourbonnois
Le chef des arts (Chief of the arts)		Jean-Paul Spesoller called La Tour
Chorus: Followers of the chief of arts; the Muses
1st entrée: La Fable
Alcide (Hercules)	haute-contre	Pierre Jélyotte
Hébé (Hebe)	soprano	Marie Fel
Jupiter	bass	Joseph Le Page
Le Destin (Destiny)	bass	Lefèvre
Chorus : Games, Graces, Pleasures and followers of Hebe; gods and goddesses
2nd entrée: L'Histoire
Seleucus	basse-taille (bass)	Claude-Louis-Dominique De Chassé de Chinais
Stratonice	soprano	Marie-Jeanne Chevalier
Antiochus	haute-contre	Pierre Jélyotte
Une syrienne (A Syrian woman)	soprano	Marie-Angélique Coupée
Chorus: Peoples and warriors of Syria
3rd entrée: La Féerie
Oriade	soprano	Mlle Rotisset de Romainville
Argélie	soprano	Marie Fel
Zimès	basse-taille (bass)	Claude-Louis-Dominique de Chassé de Chinais
Chorus: Hunters; a troupe of nymphs from Oriade's court

== Synopsis ==
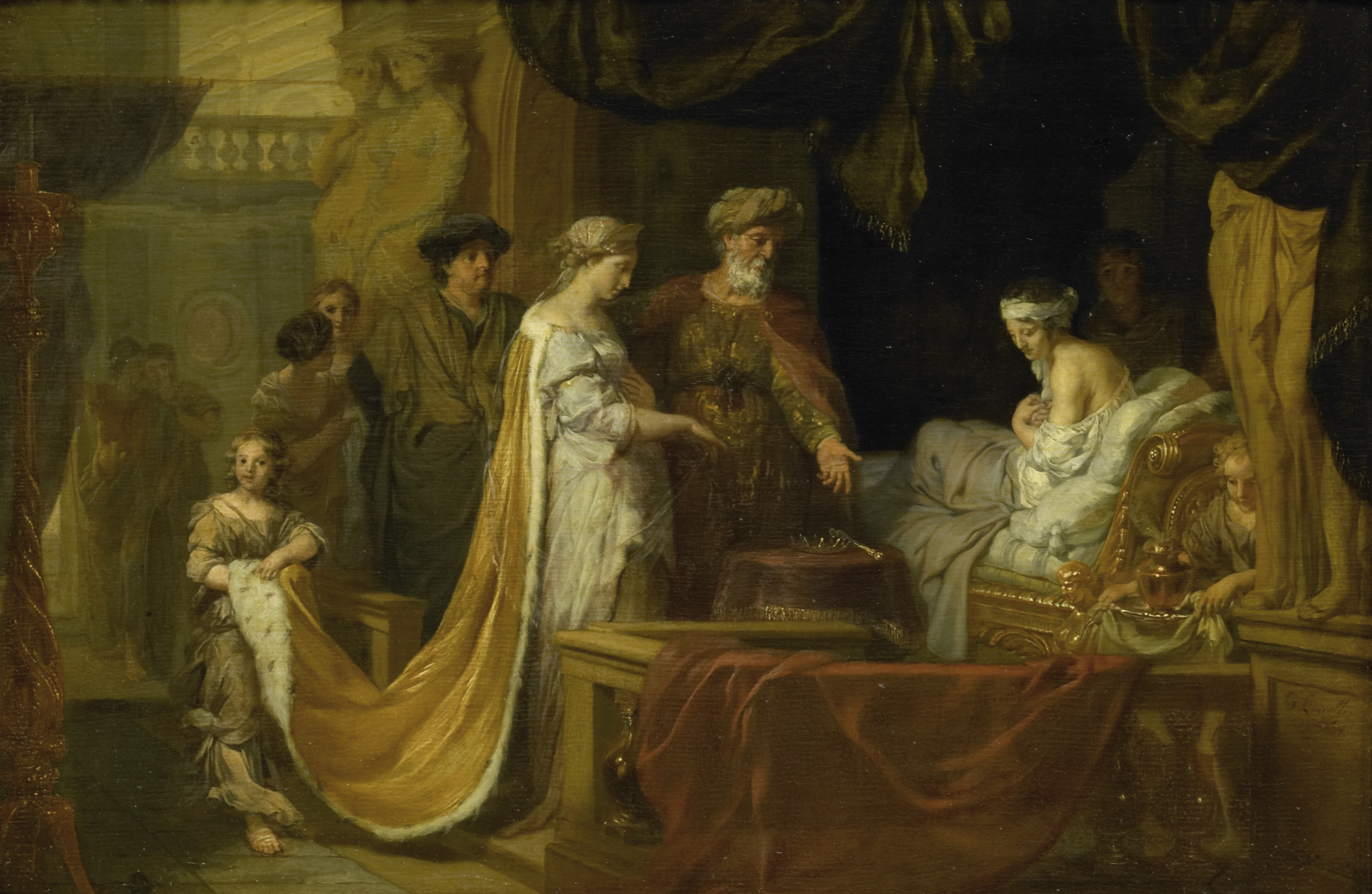
Antiochus and Stratonice, Gerard de Lairesse, 1671-1675, Rijksmuseum Twenthe

The prologue, Le temple de Mémoire ("The Temple of Memory"), describes the victory of Fontenoy in allegorical fashion. The first entrée is entitled La fable (Legend) and depicts the marriage of Hercules and Hebe, the goddess of youth. The second entrée, L'histoire ("History"), tells the story of the Hellenistic king of Syria Seleucus I Nicator, who gives up his fiancée Stratonice when he learns his son Antiochus I Soter is passionately in love with her (this tale was also the subject of a later 18th century French opera, Étienne Méhul's Stratonice). The third and final entrée is called La féerie ("Fairy tale") and is set in the Middle East. Through her love for him, Argélie redeems Zimès from the power of the evil fairy Alcina.

== Recording ==
- Les fêtes de Polymnie Véronique Gens, Emöke Baráth, Aurélia Legay, Mathias Vidal, Thomas Dolié, Purcell Choir, Orfeo Orchestra conducted by György Vashegyi (2 CDs, Glossa 2015)

== Sources ==
- Casaglia, Gherardo (2005). "Les fêtes de Polymnie". L'Almanacco di Gherardo Casaglia (in Italian).
- Holden, Amanda (Ed.), The New Penguin Opera Guide, New York: Penguin Putnam, 2001. ISBN 0-14-029312-4
- Girdlestone, Cuthbert, Jean-Philippe Rameau: His Life and Work (Dover paperback edition, 1969)
- Sadler, Graham, (Ed.), The New Grove French Baroque Masters Grove/Macmillan, 1988
