= Le temple de la Gloire =

Opéra-ballet by Jean-Philippe Rameau

- Opéra-ballet by Jean-Philippe Rameau
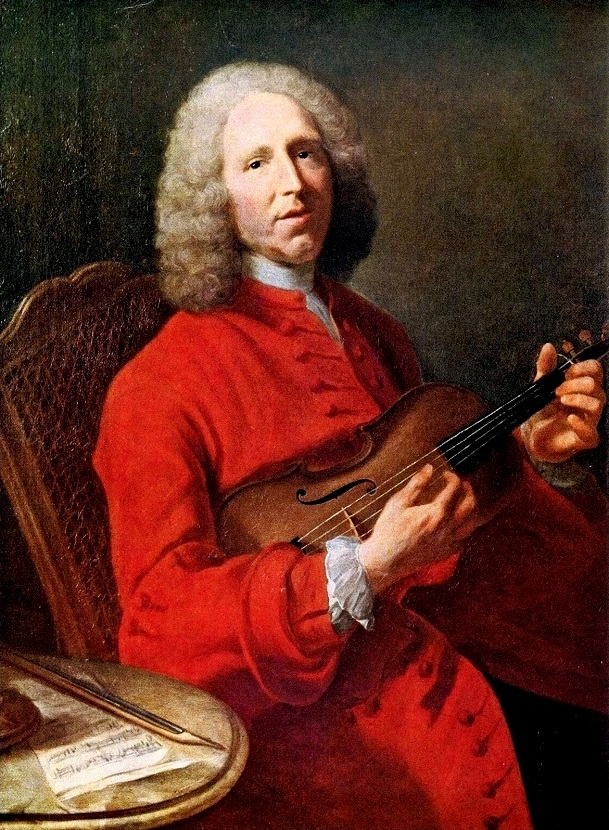
- Portrait of Rameau by Jacques Aved, c. 1728
- Librettist: Voltaire
- Language: French
- Premiere: 7 December 1745; Palace of Versailles

Le temple de la Gloire (The Temple of Glory) is an opéra-ballet by Jean-Philippe Rameau with a libretto by Voltaire. The work was first performed in a five-act version on 27 November 1745 at the Grande Écurie, Versailles to celebrate the French victory at the Battle of Fontenoy. It transferred, unsuccessfully, to the Paris Opéra on 7 December 1745. A revised version, in a prologue and three acts, appeared at the Opéra on 19 April 1746.

== Roles: 1745 version ==
Role	Voice type	Premiere Cast
Act 1
L'Envie (Envy)	basse-taille (bass-baritone) (travesti role)	François Le Page
Apollon (Apollo)	haute-contre	Pierre Jélyotte
Une muse (A Muse)	soprano	Mlle Rotisset de Romainville
Chorus: Demons accompanying Envy; Muses and heroes accompanying Apollo
Dancers: Eight demons, seven heroes and the nine Muses
Act 2
Bélus	basse-taille	Claude-Louis-Dominique Chassé de Chinais
Lidie	soprano	Marie-Jeanne Fesch, known as Mlle Chevalier
Arsine	soprano	Mlle Jacquet
Une bergère (A shepherdess)	soprano	Mlle Bourbonnois the elder
Un berger (A shepherd)	basse-taille	M Albert
Un autre berger (Another shepherd)	haute-contre	Jean-Paul Spesoller called La Tour
Apollon (Apollo)	haute-contre	Pierre Jélyotte
Les neuf Muses (The nine Muses)		Mlles Romainville, Canavasse, Jacquet, Delastre; Monsieurs Le Begue, Duguet
Chorus: Shepherds and shepherdesses; captive kings accompanying Bélus
Dancers: Shepherds and shepherdesses
Act 3
Bacchus	haute-contre	François Poirier
Érigone	soprano	Marie Fel
Grand prêtre de la Gloire (High Priest of Glory)	basse-taille	François Le Page
Une prêtresse (a priestess)	soprano	Mlle de Metz
Un guerrier (a warrior)	basse-taille	M Benoist
Une bacchante	soprano	Marie-Angélique Coupé or Coupée
Chorus: Priests and priestesses of Glory; warriors, aegipans, bacchantes, and satyrs accompanying Bacchus
Dancers: First divertissement: five priestesses of Glory, four heroes; Second divertissement: nine bacchantes, six aegypans, eight satyrs
Act 4
Trajan	haute-contre	Pierre Jélyotte
Plautine	soprano	Marie-Jeanne Fesch, known as Mlle Chevalier
Junie	soprano	Mlle Romainville
Fanie	soprano	Mlle Canavasse
Vanquished kings accompanying Trajan	hautes-contre, taille (baritenor), two basses-tailles	François Poirier, La Tour, Le Fevre, Gallard, Albert, Person
Chorus: Priests of Mars and priestesses of Venus; Roman men and women; followers of Glory
Dancers: First divertissement: four priests and five priestesses of Mars; Second divertissement: followers of Glory, five men and four women
Act 5
Une Romaine (A Roman woman)	soprano	Mlle Bourbonnois the elder
Un Romain (A Roman man)	basse-taille	M Benoist
Une bergère (A shepherdess)	soprano	Marie-Angélique Coupé or Coupée
NB: All characters from Act 4 appear in Act 5
Chorus: Shepherds and shepherdesses; young Roman men and women
Dancers: Romans of different estates: First quadrille: three men and two women; Second quadrille: three men and two women; Third quadrille: three women and two men; Fourth quadrille: three women and two men.

== Synopsis: 1746 version ==
=== Prologue ===
Scene: The Cave of Envy with the Temple of Glory in the background

Envy and her followers plot to destroy the Temple of Glory but their attack is thwarted by Apollo, the Muses, the demi-gods and heroes. Apollo condemns Envy to be chained eternally to the foot of the temple. The prologue ends with a celebration of peace and the arts.

=== Act 1: Bélus ===
Scene: The grove of the Muses with the Temple of Glory in the background

King Bélus has deserted his love, the princess Lydie, in a quest for glory through brutal military conquest. Lydie seeks consolation with the Muses and the local shepherds and shepherdesses try to comfort her with their dances. Bélus and his warriors arrive. The gods have rejected his claim to enter the Temple of Glory because of his tyranny. Lydie and the shepherds persuade him that a true king should spread happiness among his people rather than wage war.

=== Act 2: Bacchus ===
Scene: Outside the Temple of Glory

Bacchus's followers celebrate his conquest of Asia. Bacchus boasts of his invention of wine to his lover Érigone. As he approaches the Temple of Glory the High Priest forbids him to enter: he may have won fame by spreading drunken debauchery but only deeds of virtue bring lasting glory. Undiscouraged, Bacchus and his followers set off on their travels again.

=== Act 3: Trajan ===
Scene: The city of Artaxata, partly in ruins. Triumphal arches.

The Emperor Trajan's wife Plautine has followed him to Armenia where he is fighting to crush a rebellion by five kings. Plautine persuades the priests of Mars and the priestesses of Venus to pray for Trajan's success in battle. Trajan returns victorious with the conquered kings in chains, but he magnanimously forgives them and has them freed. Glory descends from the skies to offer Trajan a laurel wreath and the scene changes to her temple. Trajan says he is not worthy of such a great honour and asks for the gods to transform it into the Temple of Happiness for all the world instead.

== Recordings ==
=== Audio ===
- Le temple de la Gloire (1745 version), Philharmonia Baroque Orchestra & Chorale, conducted by Nicholas McGegan (2 CDs, PBP, 2018)
- Le temple de la Gloire (1746 version), Choeur de Chambre de Namur, Les Agrémens, conducted by Guy Van Waas (2 CDs, Ricercar, 2015)
- Le temple de la Gloire (1746 version), La Grande Écurie et la Chambre du Roy, conducted by Jean-Claude Malgoire (2 LPs, CBS, 1982)

== Sources ==
- Original libretto : Le Temple de la Gloire, Feste donnée à Versailles, le 27 Novembre 1745, Paris, Ballard, 1745 (accessible for free online at Gallica - B.N.F.)
- Period manuscript score: Le Temple de la Gloire, Opéra de M De Voltaire; mis en musique par M Rameau (...), kept at and digitized by the Bibliothèque nationale de France (accessible for free online at Gallica - B.N.F.)
- Girdlestone, Cuthbert, Jean-Philippe Rameau: His Life and Work Dover paperback edition, 1969
- Holden, Amanda (Ed.), The New Penguin Opera Guide, New York: Penguin Putnam, 2001. ISBN 0-14-029312-4
- Sadler, Graham, The New Grove French Baroque Masters Grove/Macmillan, 1988
- Rameau Le Site
