= Jacques Autreau =

French painter

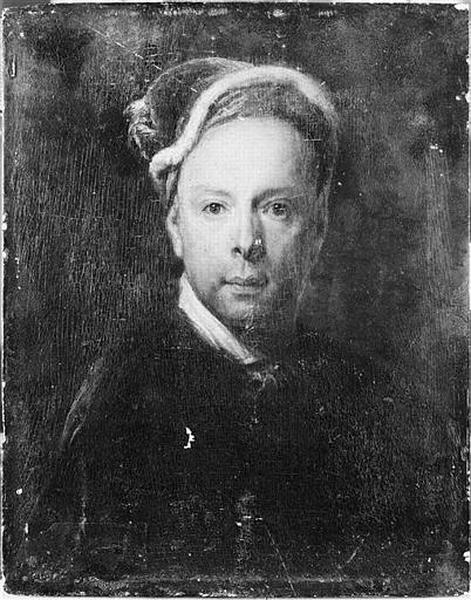
- Born: October 1657; Paris
- Died: November 16, 1745 (aged 88); Paris
- Occupations: Portrait painter, dramatic poet

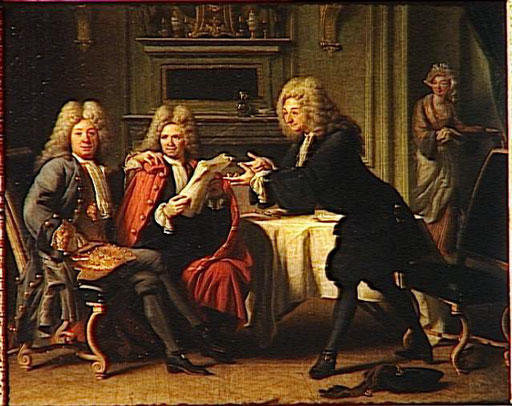
Bodin, Dufresny and Crébillon at the Maison d'Auteuil, painting from 1716 now in the Palace of Versailles.

Jacques Autreau (1657– November 16, 1745) was a French dramatic poet and painter. His works for theatre include comedies, operas, and ballets.

== Early life ==
He was born in France. According to the registers of the church of Saint Barthélemy, he was baptized on October 30 of the same year.

== Career ==
=== Artistic career ===
A poem addressed to the cardinal de Fleury suggests that Autreau did not earn much income from his paintings. The number of paintings Autreau created is unknown, as very few have survived to the present day. One surviving painting is a self-portrait, which is displayed in the Palace of Versailles. Another painting mentioned in the poem is a portrait of the Greek philosopher Diogenes with the inscription “Quem frustra quæsivit Cynicus olim, ecce inventus adest. [Whom the Cynic once sought in vain, behold, he is found here]”, which, along with the aforementioned poem, was presented to the cardinal de Fleury. However, there are no physical remnants of the painting of Diogenes. The poem to the cardinal de Fleury also suggests a friendship between Autreau and Antoine Houdar de La Motte, and that La Motte encouraged Autreau to pursue writing to earn income: “J'ai donc pris la beche et le pic / Pour cultiver la poesie; / La peinture, sa sceur, le vit sans jalousie; / La Motte, mon ami, par un doux pronostic, / M'inspirant cette fantaisie…[So I took up the spade and the pick/ To cultivate poetry:/ Painting, its sister, saw it without jealousy; / La Motte, my friend, by a sweet prognosis, / Inspiring this fantasy in me…]".

=== Literary career ===
Autreau was frequently referenced among literary circles throughout the early 18th century. According to the works of Voltaire, Autreau was involved in the sonnet controversy of Jean-Baptiste Rousseau, a literary dispute among writers that included La Motte and Antoine Danchet, as well as other frequenters of the Café Laurent, a cafe within the Hotel d'Aubusson in France that was a literary hotspot for French writers throughout the late 17th and early 18th century. A sonnet in which Rousseau belittles the clientele of the Café Laurent includes the mention of Autreau: "Dieu nous delivre... du peintre Hautereau toujours ivre. [God deliver us... from the painter Hautereau, always drunk]”. A chanson by Autreau was made in response, claiming that Rousseau had been possessed by the devil after publicly rejecting his father. The chanson is also referenced by Voltaire in the book Vie de J.-B. Rousseau: “Dans cette guerre, si deshonorante pour l'esprit humain, un nomme Autreau, homme assez franc, d'ailleurs mauvais peintre et mauvais poete, fit contre Rousseau une chanson, qui fut pour lui le plus cuisant de tant d'affronts. Cette chanson, que nous rapportons, etait dans le gout le plus naif de celles du Pont-Neuf, et par la meme n'etait que plus outrageante, comme on va le voir. [In this war, so dishonorable to the human spirit, a man named Autreau, a fairly frank man, and also a poor painter and a poor poet, wrote a song against Rousseau, which was for him the most stinging of so many affronts. This song, which we report, was in the most naive taste of those of the Pont-Neuf, and for that reason was all the more outrageous, as we shall see]”.

=== Theatrical career ===
On April 25, 1718, Le Port-d-l'Anglais or Le Naufrage au Port-à-l'Anglois, a three-act comedy in prose, was produced for the first time by the Comédie-Italienne (also referred to as the Italian troupe). The play was a success. Since most productions performed by the Comédie-Italienne were in Italian, audience comprehension was low. However, since Le Port-d-l'Anglais was in French, it helped revive popularity for the struggling theater company. Another factor in the success of Le Port-d-l'Anglais was Autreau’s addition of a prologue, in which the cast has a conversation about the potential reception of the play they were about to perform. Silvia, one of the protagonists, worries about having to speak in French, but is reassured by her sister Flaminia that any mistakes in the language could be attributed to their character, as they play a pair of Italian immigrants who have just arrived in France. Autreau’s prologue acted as insurance for the Comédie-Italienne and excused away any mistakes the cast may have made while performing.

On December 27, 1718, the Italian troupe, eager to replicate the success of Le Port-d-l'Anglais, produced L'Amante Romanesque, or La Capricieuse, a five-act romantic comedy featuring the same characters from Le Port-d-l'Anglais. However, it was not as successful as its predecessor. Autreau, believing it was simply not valued by the public, sought to improve it. He cut the play down to three acts and added a prologue similar to that of Le Port-d-l'Anglais, meant to inform the audience of any mistakes that would occur in the play. While it was received slightly better after its improvements, it would still only perform one more time, at the Palais-Royal.

On April 14, 1720, the Comédie-Italienne produced Les Amants Ignorants, another three-act comedy, once again featuring the same characters as its two predecessors. The play also contained musical divertissements.

According to Charles-Étienne Pesselier, Autreau wrote another play, Panurge á Marier, or La Coquetterie Universelle, an Italian-style three-act burlesque comedy, to be produced by the Italian troupe. However, Panurge á Marier was never performed.

On December 2, 1723, the Comédie-Italienne produced the three-act prose comedy La Fille Inquiète or Le Besoin d'Aimer, which shared the same characters as Le Port-d-l'Anglais and its companion plays. While the play would only be performed once, its printed copies sold out promptly after publication.

On April 24, 1730, the Italian troupe produced Démocrite Prétendu Fou, a free-verse three-act comedy. Since it was written in free verse, Démocrite was a diversion from Autreau’s typical style. It was also seen as a turning point in Autreau’s career as a dramatist, as every play following Démocrite (except for one, Les Faux Amis Démasqués) would be written in free verse rather than prose.

On November 23, 1731, the Comédie-Française (or Théâtre-Français) performed Le Chevalier Bayard, a five-act heroic comedy in free verse. Wanting to make revisions, Autreau withdrew the play after six performances, but it never returned to the stage.

On May 9, 1731, the Théâtre-Français produced La Magie de l’Amour, a one-act pastorale in free verse. After a poor reception from its first performance, Autreau made several revisions. The play would run for fifteen more performances following its revision.

Autreau also wrote the play Panurge Marié Dans Les Espaces Imaginaires, which was a one-act sequel to the aforementioned Panurge á Marier. Both plays remained unproduced.

Another unproduced play of Autreau’s was Les Faux Amis Démasqués, which was a five-act play in alexandrine verse. Alexandrine verse was the customary style most French playwrights used, but Les Faux Amis Démasqués was the only play Autreau wrote in that style of verse. Les Faux Amis Démasqués was also the only play after Democrité that was not written in free verse.

In addition to comedies, Autreau also created several ballets and operas. One was L’Opéra de Rhodope, a three-act lyrical poem that was meant to be an opera, but never set to music.

Another was the ballet Platée, or La Naissance de la Comédie, which contained three acts as well as a prologue, with music from Jean-Philippe Rameau.

Autreau also created Les Fêtes de Corinthe, a three-act comedy ballet, Le Galant Corsaire, a one-act ballet, and Mercure et Dryo, a one-act pastorale, all of which were never performed.

== Death ==
Autreau died on November 16, 1745, at the Hospital for Incurables (renamed The Laennec Hospital in the nineteenth century) at the age of eighty-eight.

== List of theatrical works ==
- Le Naufrage au Port-à-l'Anglois, ou Le Port-d-l'Anglais, (25 April 1718), Théâtre-Italien;
- L’Amante Romanesque, ou La Capricieuse, (27 December 1718), Théâtre-Italien;
- Les Amants Ignorans, (14 April 1720), Théâtre-Italien;
- Panurge À Marier, (non présented);
- La Fille Inquiète, ou Le Besoin d’Aimer, (2 December 1723), Théâtre-Italien;
- Démocrite Prétendu Fou, (24 April 1730), Théâtre-Italien;
- Le Chevalier Bayard, (23 November 1731), Théâtre-Français;
- La Magie de l’Amour, (9 May 1731), Théâtre-Français;
- L’Opéra de Rhodope (non présented);
- Platée ou La Naissance de la Comédie, (31 March 1745) music by Rameau;
- Les Faux Amis, ou Les Faux Amis Démasqués, (non présented);
- Panurge Marié Dans Les Espaces Imaginaires, (non présented);
- Les Fêtes de Corinthe, (non présented);
- Le Galant Corsaire, (non présented);
- Mercure & Dryope, (non présented);
