= Atys (Piccinni) =

Tragédie lyrique in three acts by Niccolò Piccinni

- Tragédie lyrique by Niccolò Piccinni
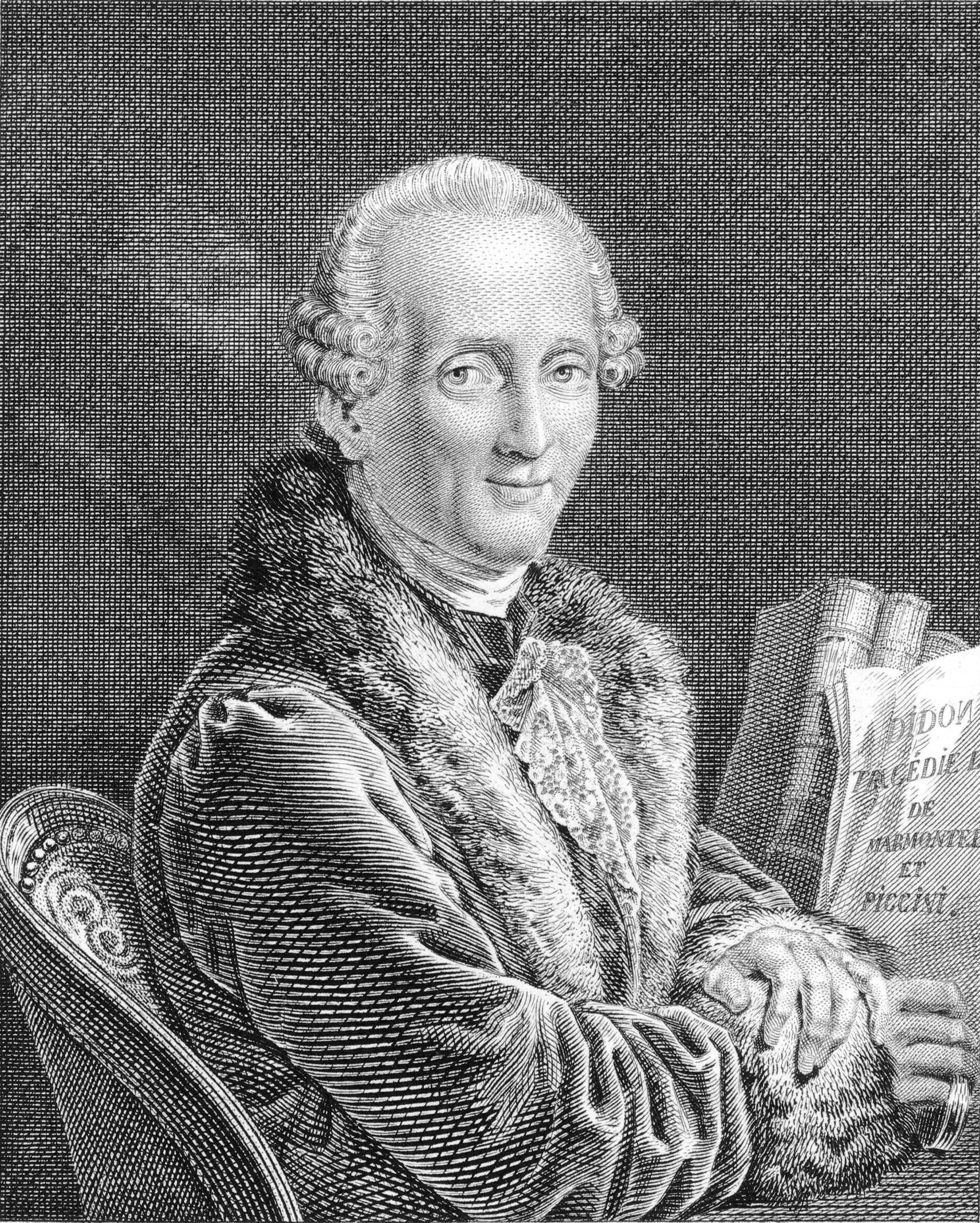
- Niccolò Piccinni, engraving by Hippolyte Pauquet
- Librettist: Jean-François Marmontel
- Language: French
- Based on: Ovid's Fasti
- Premiere: 22 February 1780; Salle du Palais-Royal, Paris

Atys is a tragédie lyrique in three acts by Niccolò Piccinni with a French libretto by Jean-François Marmontel. Marmontel's libretto was based on Philippe Quinault's libretto for Jean-Baptiste Lully's 1676 opera of the same title. Quinault based his rendition on Ovid's Fasti. Marmontel adapted Quinault's libretto and modified it by removing the prologue and divertissements. He also altered the plot; instead of using Ovid's metamorphic ending (which Quinault used), Atys commits suicide. Piccinni's opera was premiered by the Paris Opera at the second Salle du Palais-Royal on 22 February 1780. Musically the opera is admired for its fugal overture, the dream sequence in act 2, the long quartet at the dramatic climax, and the somber dirge with which it ends.

In 1783, a second version of the opera was produced by Piccinni and Marmontel. In order to satisfy the prevailing trends in opera, they changed the ending to a lieto fine, or happy ending, by rewriting entire sections of the original opera. In this second version Atys was returned to the stage of the Opéra in 1783, 1784, 1791 and 1792. In all, it was mounted at the Opéra on 65 dates before being dropped for good.

== Roles ==
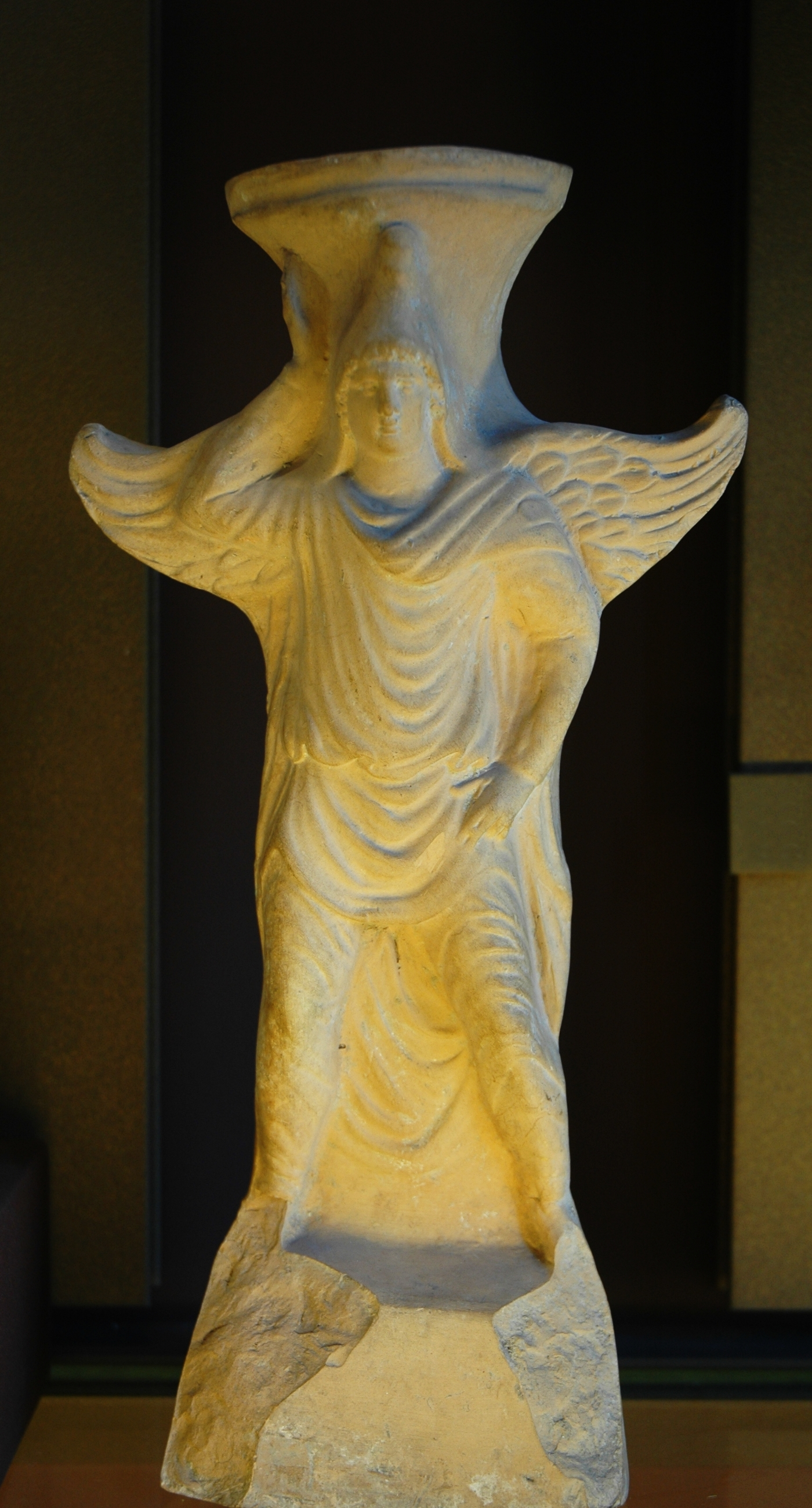
Attis wearing the Phrygian cap

Roles, voice types, premiere cast
Cast	Voice type	Premiere cast: 22 February 1780
Atys (Attis), a friend of Celœnus	haute-contre	Joseph Legros (Le Gros)
Cybèle	soprano	Françoise-Claude-Marie-Rosalie Campagne (called Mlle Duplant)
Sangaride, a Phrygian princess	soprano	Marie-Joséphine Laguerre
Celœnus, King of Phrygia	bass-baritone	Henri Larrivée
Idas, confidant of Attis	tenor	Étienne Lainez
Mélisse, confidante of Cybele	soprano	Mlle Chateauvieux
Doris, confidante of Sangaride	soprano	Suzanne Joinville
Morphée (Morpheus)	bass	M Durand
Suite of Morpheus	tenors/bass-baritones	François Lays, M. Royer, Jean-Joseph Rousseau, Auguste-Athanase (Augustin) Chéron, M. Mèon, M. Tacusset
Pleasant Dreams	sopranos	Anne-Marie-Jeanne Gavaudan, l'aînée, Gertrude Girardin, Mlle Rozalie, Mlle Dubuisson
A Dreadful Dream	bass	M. Moreau
Chorus: Dreadful Dreams, suite of the King, Phrygians, Korybantes, Dactites
Ballet: Anna Heinel, Marie-Madeleine Guimard, Grenier, Peslin; Gaetano Vestris, Pierre Gardel, Auguste Vestris, Jean Dauberval

== Synopsis (original 1780 version) ==
=== Act 1 ===
Atys, is secretly in love with the nymph Sangaride who is betrothed to Atys' friend King Célénus. Atys confesses his secret to his close friend Idas. Unbeknownst to Atys, Sangaride is also secretly in love with him, a fact which she confides to Doris who is Idas's sister. When Cybele, the great Phrygian Mother of the Gods, arrives the Phrygians celebrate her presence. Atys and Sangaride initially try to conceal their feelings from one another but eventually they confess their love for each other. The act ends with the goddess Cybèle announcing the surprise decision to make Atys Sangaride's "great Sacrificer" rather than Célénus.

=== Act 2 ===
The goddess Cybèle confesses to Mélisse, her confidante, that she too is in love with Atys. Meanwhile, Célénus tries to discern Sangaride's true feeling for him by questioning Atys. Atys assures him that Sangaride will be a good wife for him. After Célénus leaves, Atys reflects upon his conflicting feelings regarding his friendship to Célénus and his love for Sangaride. While doing so, Atys falls asleep and is visited in his dreams by Morphée, the God of Sleep. Morphée reveals to Atys that Cybèle is in love with him and that he must give up Sangaride for her or there will be disastrous consequences. Atys awakes and finds Cybèle looking down upon him. Sangaride enters and requests Cybèle to free her from her engagement to Célénus. Atys, however, prevents Sangaride from revealing their love for one another which confuses her. Cybèle agrees to break the engagement off but realises that the whole truth is being kept from her.

=== Act 3 ===
Sangaride is distressed over Atys's behavior and comes to believe that he is in love with Cybèle. Heartbroken, Sangaride decides to abandon pursuing Atys and renew her engagement to Célénus. Atys enters and a quarrel ensues, eventually ending in the reconciliation of the two lovers. Unbeknownst to them, Cybèle has witnessed this argument and out of jealousy decides to get revenge on the lovers with the help of Célénus. Cybèle casts a spell upon Atys to make him insane. Under this spell, Atys murders Sangaride, mistaking her for a monster. After Célénus informs everyone about this murder, Cybèle restores Atys' sanity. Upon learning of Sangaride's murder by his own hands, Atys despairs and commits suicide.
