= Dugazon family =

French acting family

The Dugazon family (after their stage name) or the Gourgaud family was a famous acting dynasty in 18th century France. It was founded by Pierre-Antoine Gourgaud (1706–1774), whose children included the actors Françoise-Rose Gourgaud (1743–1804) and Jean-Henri Gourgaud (1746–1809). It also includes members of the family by marriage, such as Jean-Henri's wife Louise-Rosalie Lefebvre (1755–1821), a mezzo-soprano opera singer who used the stage name Madame Dugazon after her marriage. Via Françoise-Rose's marriage to Angiolo Vestris, it also became linked to the Vestris family.

== Others ==
- Alexandre-Louis-Gustave Dugazon [Gourgaud]

Others :

- Gaspard Gourgaud
