= Les surprises de l'Amour =

Opéra-ballet by Jean-Philippe Rameau

- Opéra-ballet by Jean-Philippe Rameau
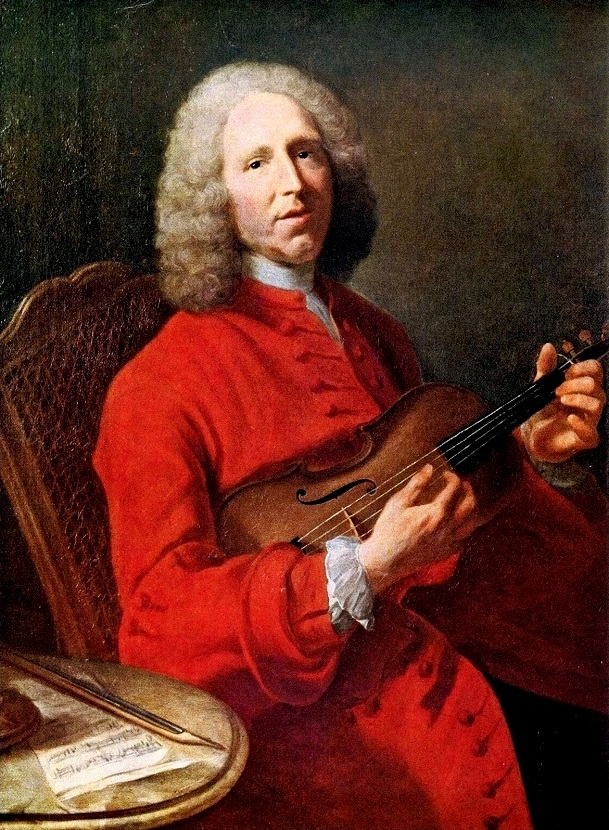
- Portrait of Rameau by Jacques Aved, c. 1728
- Librettist: Gentil-Bernard
- Language: French
- Premiere: 27 November 1748; Palace of Versailles

Les surprises de l'Amour is an opéra-ballet in two entrées (three or four in later versions) and a prologue by the French composer Jean-Philippe Rameau. It was first performed in Versailles on 27 November 1748. The opera is set to a libretto by Gentil-Bernard. According to the usage of the time, it was originally just billed as a ballet and was only later classified by scholars as an opéra-ballet, although its content might more precisely ascribe it to the ballet héroïque genre.

The original 1748 version consisted of a prologue and two entrées (acts), "La lyre enchantée" and "Adonis". For its 1757 revival, Rameau cut the prologue and added a third entrée, "Anacréon". The composer had written another opera under the title Anacréon in 1754. The earlier work has a libretto by Louis de Cahusac and a completely different plot. Both are linked by the figure of the ancient Greek lyric poet Anacreon. William Christie and Marc Minkowski have recorded the 1757 Anacréon separately. The complete 1757 Les surprises de l'Amour did not appear on disc until Sébastien d'Hérin's recording in 2013.

== Performance history ==
The work was commissioned by Madame de Pompadour to celebrate the Treaty of Aix-la-Chapelle and premiered at the third-season opening of her Théâtre des Petits Appartements for the inauguration of the Theatre's new venue upon the Grand Escalier des Ambassadeurs (Ambassadors' Grand Staircase) in the Palace of Versailles, starring Madame De Pompadour herself in two of the original soprano roles, Urania and Venus. In its first form, the work was composed of an allegorical prologue relating to the Treaty of Aix-la-Chapelle, "Le retour d'Astrée", and of two entrées, "La lyre enchantée" and "Adonis". Les surprises de l'amour was the first opera specially written by Rameau for the Théâtre des Petits Appartements and was also his first work that was given in the course of its programmes. It was not particularly successful: scenery, costumes, machinery and the new theatre venue were much admired, but the opera itself got the king to openly yawn and to confess he "would like better a comedy".

The work was revived at the Paris Opéra in 1757 to inaugurate the new directors, François Francœur and François Rebel. The prologue, which was no longer relevant, was cut, and a new overture was performed in its place. The two original entrées were heavily revised: "Adonis" was renamed "L'enlèvement d'Adonis" (The rape of Adonis) and a third entrée, "Anacréon", was added. Its first run lasted until 14 August 1757, but only its second and third entrées were performed after 10 July (the original La lyre enchantée was replaced by a version of Les sibarites, an acte de ballet by Rameau to a libretto by Jean-François Marmontel, first performed in 1753). The different entrées were swapped around at various times for later performances and the "self-sufficiency of each portion of Les surprises de l'Amour made the tripartite work a likely source of material for the programs of fragments growing popular in the years before the Revolution".

Writing in Grove Music Online, Graham Sadler considers the air "Nouvelle Hébé, charmante Lycoris" for Anacreon's bass part and the "ravishing, chromatic sommeil" to be "especially fine", and the whole entrée to be the best piece of the opera. Despite the opinion reported by Charles Collé that the 1757 version "[smelt] of old age" (Rameau was by then 73), Sadler believes that "the new and revised music is almost invariably more interesting than that of the original", and that "the airs de ballet are, as always, amazingly inventive". Spire Pitou partly shared Sadler's appreciation, he states that "Rameau's most striking passage in Les surprises de l'Amour was the 'sleep music' in [the] concluding act".

== Roles ==
Roles, voice types, premiere casts
Role	Voice type/ dancing character	Premiere cast, 27 November 1748	Cast of the Palais-Royal first performance, 31 May 1757
Prologue: "Le Retour d'Astrée" (Astraea's return)			cut from 1757 version
Vulcain	basse-taille (bass-baritone)	The Duke of Ayen	
Astrée	soprano	Mme de Brancas	
Un Plaisir (a Pleasure)	soprano	Mme de Marchais	
Le Temps (Time)	basse-taille	the Marquis of La Salle	
First (1757: Second) entrée: "La lyre enchantée" (The enchanted lyre)
Uranie	soprano	Mme de Pompadour	Marie-Jeanne Fesch "Mlle Chevalier"
L'Amour (Cupid)	soprano	Mme de Marchais	
Parténope	soprano		Marie Fel
Linus	basse-taille (1748)/ haute-contre (1757)	M. de la Salle	François Poirier
Apollon	basse-taille		Henri Larrivée
Terpsichore	dancer		Louise-Madeleine Lany
Les Muses	dancers		Mlles Coupée, Marquise, Chevrier, Riquet
Sirènes (Sirens)	dancers		Mlles Deschamps, Mopin, Pagés, Chaumart
Élèves de Terpsichore (Terpsichore's pupils)	dancers		Mrs Dubois, Lelièvre, Balety, Beat
Sylvains et Dryades (Sylvans and Dryads)	dancers		Melles Lyonois, Fleury, Morel, Armand, Thételingre; Mrs Lyonois, Rivet, Trupty, Dupré (fils), Hus
Second (1757: First) entrée: "Adonis" (1748) or "L'enlèvement d'Adonis" (The rape of Adonis) (1757)
Vénus	soprano	Mme de Pompadour	Mlle Davaux
L'Amour (Cupid)	soprano	Mme de Marchais	Marie-Jeanne Larrivée Lemière
Diane	soprano	Mme de Brancas	Louise Jacquet
Adonis	basse-taille (1748)/ soprano (1757)	the Duke of Ayen	Mlle Dubois
Suivant de Diane (a follower of Diane)	haute-contre	the Viscount of Rohan	
Mercure	haute-contre		Godart
A nymph	soprano		Mlle Lhéritier
Endymion (ballet)	dancer		Gaétan Vestris
Diane (ballet)	dancer		Marie-Françoise-Thérèse Vestris
L'Amour (Cupid) (ballet)	dancer		Mlle Guimard
Les Grâces (the Graces)	dancers		Mlles Marquise, Coupée, Chevrier
Nymphes et chasseurs (nymphs and hunters)	dancers		Mlles Louise-Madeleine Lany, Fleury, Morel, Thételingre; Mrs Laval, Lyonois, Rivet, Trupty, Dupré
Jeux et Plaisirs (games and pleasures)	dancers		Mlles Riquet, Pagés, Chomart, Mopin, Deschamps; Mrs Dubois, Hamoche, Beat, Balety, Galodier
Third entrée: "Anacréon" (1757)
		not in 1748 version	
L'Amour (Cupid)	soprano		Marie-Jeanne Larrivée Lemière
Anacréon	basse-taille		Nicolas Gélin
La prêtresse de Bacchus (priestess of Bacchus)	soprano		Mlle Davaux
Lycoris	dancer		Mlle Puvigné
Agathocle	haute-contre		François Poirier
Euricles	haute-contre		Muguet
Deux convives (two guests)	taille (baritenor)/basse-taille		M Poussint; M Robin
Esclaves d'Anacréon (Anacréon's slaves)	dancers		Mlles Pagés, Chomart, Mopin, Deschamps; Mrs Galodier, Hamoche, Feuillade, Gaétan Vestris
Les Grâces (the Graces)	dancers		Mlles Marquise, Coupée, Chevrier
Egypans & Ménades (Egypans and Maenads)	dancers		Mlles Lyonois, Riquet, Dumirey, Morel, Fleury; Jean-Barthélemy Lany, Laval, Rivet, Hus, Dupré, Trupty
Jeux et Plaisirs (Games and Pleasures)	dancers		Mrs Dubois, Lelièvre, Beat, Balety

== Synopsis (1757 version) ==
=== 1st entrée: "L'enlèvement d'Adonis" (The rape of Adonis) ===
Topic: struggle between love and chastity

The scene is laid in a vast forest sacred to Diana, where Adonis (soprano en travesti), as a follower of the chaste goddess, abhors love as a terrible monster jeopardizing humans' peace of mind, but at the same time complains about no longer feeling the lure of sylvan life. Cupid himself (soprano en travesti) descends into the forest and approaches Adonis in order to tear him from Diana and to hand him over to Venus, who is in love with him. When Venus (soprano) arrives upon the scene, she easily succeeds in getting the better of Adonis' scruples and, supported by Cupid, they resolve to flee in order to shun Diana's dreadful wrath. When Diana (soprano) enters the scene, she charges Cupid with the abduction of credulous Adonis and entreats vengeance of heaven and hell. Mercury (haute-contre) then descends onto the scene assuring the enraged goddess that Venus will return Adonis to her, and the goddess of love re-enters over a cloud accompanied by Cupid and Adonis disguised as Cupid, so that Diana cannot tell them apart. Since Adonis refuses to reveal himself, Diana decides to withdraw for fear of possibly choosing Cupid, her bitterest enemy. The entrée goes on firstly to a ballet celebrating the coming wedding of Venus and Adonis, as in the distance Diana herself (ballerina) is shown to be falling in love with a sleeping Endymion (male dancer), and then to further more elaborate ballets representing Diana and Cupid's(ballerina en travesti) meeting, Cupid's wakening Endymion and eventually Endymon's making love to Diana and his admission onto her cart. The entrée ends in a festive chorus accompanied by a general dance.

=== 2nd entrée: "La lyre enchantée" (The enchanted lyre) ===
Topic: struggle between love and indifference

The scene is laid in a country valley at the foot of Montparnasse. The siren Parthenope (soprano) is in love with the musician Linus (haute-contre), but Urania (soprano), the Muse of astrology, urges him to beware of traps of love passions, for gods alone can come through them unharmed, while they will always cost humans their peace of mind. However, after her departure, Linus and Parthenope meet and confess their mutual love, whereupon the siren proposes taking vengeance on the Muses and on their enduring struggle against love ardour: for such a purpose she will leave her enchanted lyre behind, so that Urania may fall under its magic spell. The muse re-enters looking for Linus and picks the instrument, a simple touch being enough to immediately make her sing a song of love for him despite herself. Yet, to her great shame, he maintains his love to Parthenope and only Apollo's (basse-taille) arrival gets to settle the matter: he gives Urania his lyre so as to break the spell and invites the Muses and Sirens to combine their respective talents to form "the sweet chains that lead to pleasures". The entrée closes with a ballet performed by the Muses and Sirens under the guidance of Terpsichore (ballerina).

=== 3rd entrée: "Anacréon" ===
Topic: struggle between love and inebriety

The scene is laid in Teos at the poet Anacreon's house, where a feast is being held: the landlord (basse-taille), his guests, Agathocle (haute-contre) and Euricles (haute-contre), and the rest of his suite are celebrating Bacchus, the local patron god. Anacreon addresses to his beautiful slave girl, Lycoris (ballerina), a warm request that she cheer up the party with the bloom of her youth and that she be the priestess of all gods he adores, including Cupid as well as Bacchus (aria: "Nouvelle Hébé, charmante Lycoris"). As she is dancing and Anacreon singing, however, an inflamed symphony is suddenly heard and the priestess of Bacchus bursts into the scene, followed by the Maenads, objecting to the festivities on account of their profane character and of their mingling together the cults of their god and of Cupid. A ballet follows thereupon representing the confrontation between Anacreon's suite and Bacchus' followers, but eventually Anacreon and his guests yield to the priestess' demands and agree to worship Bacchus alone. As the Bacchantes go off the stage and Lycoris, as a symbol of love, is driven away, a ravishing sweet music slowly sends the whole drunken party to sleep. In his dreams Anacreon is visited by Cupid (soprano en travesti) and informed that Lycoris is dying of grief because she has been deserted for Bacchus by the insensitive man she is in love with. As he realises he is such a man, Anacreon throws himself at Cupid's feet imploring the god to return Lycoris to him, for he is willing to forgo everything else for her. Lycoris re-enters the stage accompanied by the Graces, but, as Anacreon is singing Cupid's praises, a prelude foretells the return of Bacchus' followers: they cannot however shrink from bowing down before the present god of love and paying homage to his statue, while Cupid's retinue pay homage to Bacchus' as well, and the two dancing parties mingle together under the guidance of Lycoris. The entrée ends in a chorus and in a contredanse accompanied by sistrums and "other Bacchic instruments".

== Recordings ==
=== Les surprises de l'Amour (complete) ===
- Les surprises de l'Amour (1757 version, i.e. three entrées: L'enlèvement d'Adonis; La lyre enchantée; and Anacréon) The orchestra and chorus of Les Nouveaux Caractères, conducted by Sébastien d'Hérin (Glossa, 2013).

=== Anacréon only ===
- Anacréon Les Arts Florissants, William Christie (1 CD, Harmonia Mundi, 1982)
- Anacréon Les Musiciens du Louvre, Marc Minkowski (1 CD, Deutsche Grammophon, 1996)

== Sources ==
- Lever, Évelyne, Madame de Pompadour, Perrin, Paris, 2000, ISBN 978-2-262-01225-0 (in French) (consulted edition: Madame de Pompadour. Passioni e destino di una favorita, Mondadori, Cles, 2010, ISBN 978-88-04-51762-7) (in Italian)
- Pitou, Spire, The Paris Opéra. An Encyclopedia of Operas, Ballets, Composers, and Performers – Rococo and Romantic, 1715–1815, Greenwood Press, Westport/London, 1985, ISBN 0-313-24394-8
- Sadie, Stanley (ed.), The New Grove Dictionary of Opera, Grove (Oxford University Press), New York, 1997, ISBN 978-0-19-522186-2

Online sources

- Sadler, Graham, "Les surprises de l'Amour", Grove Music Online ed L. Macy (Retrieved 3 January 2007), subscription access.
- Le magazine de l'opéra baroque, Retrieved 11 March 2010 (in French)
- Casaglia, Gherardo (2005). "Les surprises de l´Amour, 27 November 1748". L'Almanacco di Gherardo Casaglia (in Italian).
- Rameau Le Site, Retrieved 11 March 2010
- Digitized original librettos:
  - 1748 premiere
  - 1757 second version
