= Madame Vestris =

Madame Vestris may refer to:

- Lucia Elizabeth Vestris (born Lucia Elizabeth Bartolozzi, 1797–1856), English singer, actress and theatre producer and manager, married to the French dancer, Armand Vestris
- Rose Vestris (born Françoise-Rose Gourgaud, 1743-1804), French actress, married to the dancer and later actor Angiolo Vestris
