= Gustave Dugazon =

French classical composer

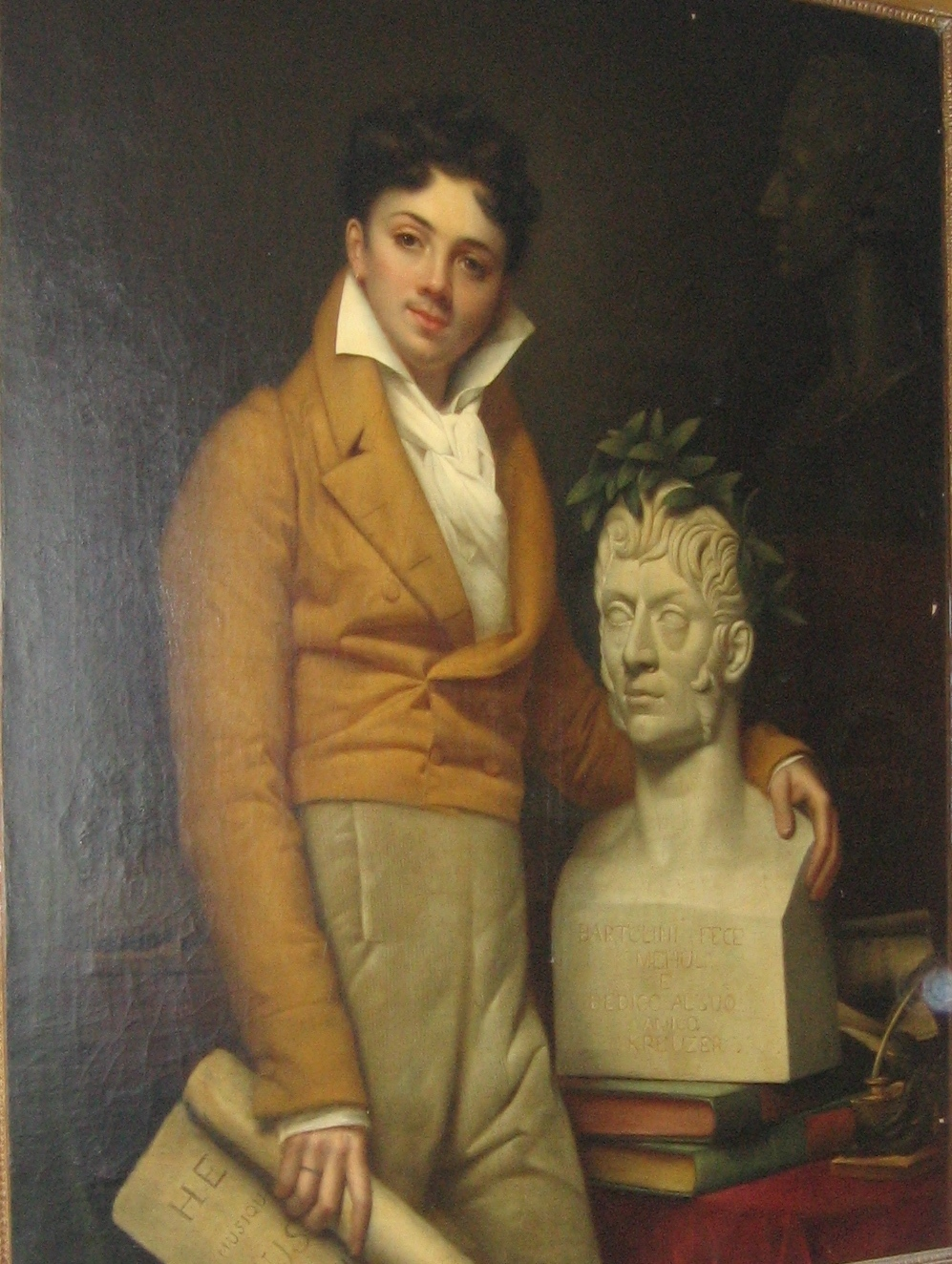
Portrait of Gustave Dugazon (1806). Unknown artist, private collection.

Gustave Dugazon (real name Alexandre Louis Gustave Gourgaud, 1 February 1781 – 12 September 1829) was a French classical composer. A contemporary of Boieldieu, Méhul, Kreutzer, Dugazon was the son of singer Louise Rosalie Lefebvre and actor Jean-Henri Gourgaud, called Dugazon.

He was also the first cousin of General Baron Gaspard Gourgaud (1783–1852).

== Life ==
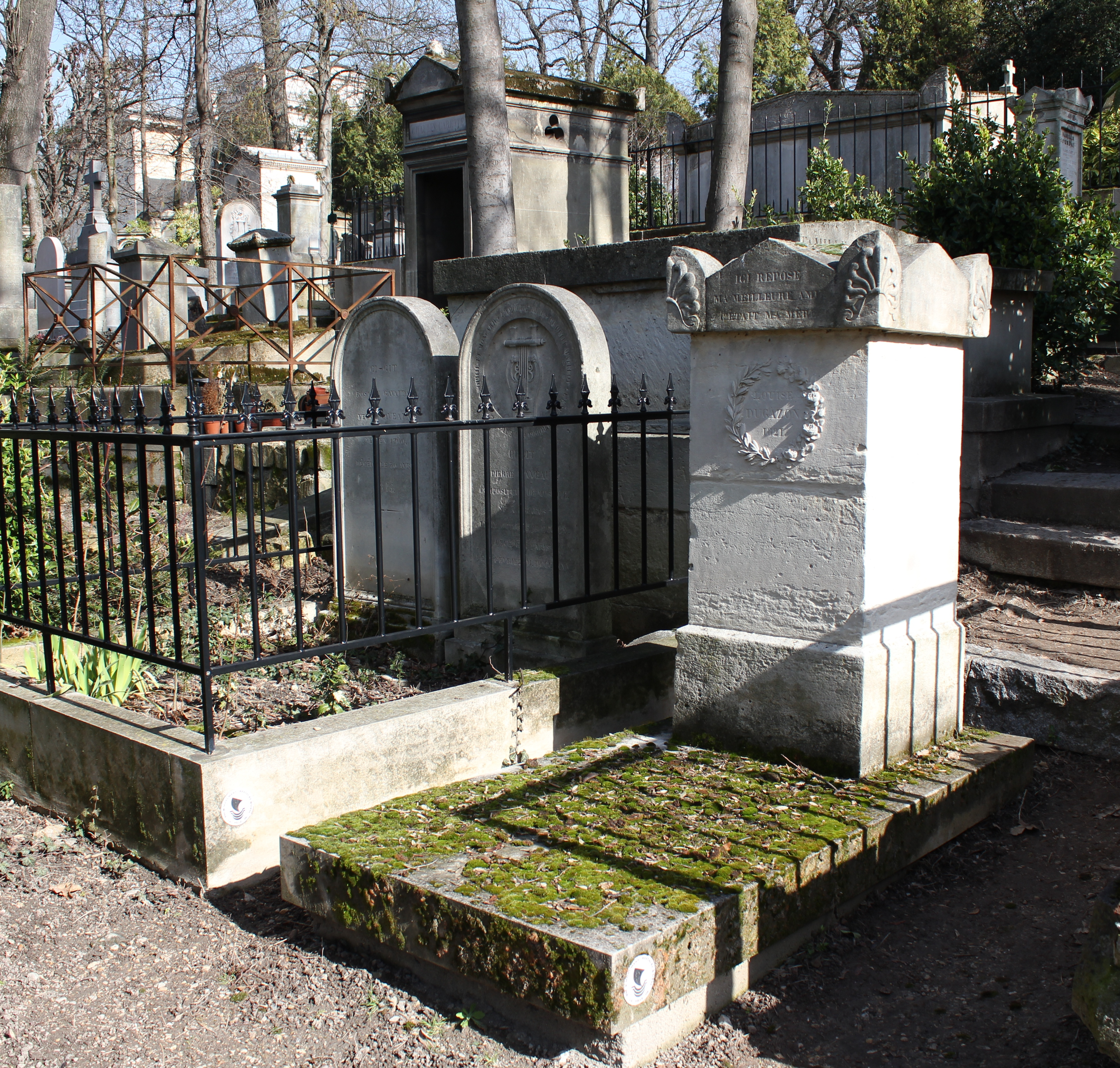
Dugazon family's grave at Père-Lachaise Cemetery.

Born in Paris and gifted at music, Dugazon entered the Conservatoire de Paris in Berton's harmony class and studied composition with Gossec.

In 1806, he obtained the first second Grand Prix de Rome with his cantata Hero, written to the lyrics by Saint-Victor. He then made a career in Paris as a composer and music teacher, teaching piano.

Dugazon is buried at Père-Lachaise Cemetery (11th division).

== Works ==
His first work, Noemie, was a ballet premiered at the Théâtre de la Porte-Saint-Martin. It was followed by a three-act opera, Marguerite de Waldemar (Theatre Feydeau, 1812), then another one-act opera, La Noce écossaise, in 1814. He wrote Le Chevalier d'industrie in 1818 in collaboration with Louis-Barthélémy Pradher, who was a piano teacher at the Conservatoire de Paris.

His ballets composed for opera, Les Fiancés de Caserte (1817), Alfred the Great (1822), and Aline (1823), were great successes.

His tunes, melodies, romances, nocturnes, fantasies, and other quadrilles of contradances pleased the audience at a time when these genres were in fashion. His music was adapted for guitar by Antoine Meissonnier (1783–1857).

- Héros, cantata, 1806
- Noémie, ballet
- Marguerite de Waldemar, one-act opera, 1812
- Noce écossaise, opera, 1814
- Les Fiancés de Caserte, ballet, 1817
- Chevalier d'industrie, opera, 1818
- Alfred le Grand, ballet, 1822
- Aline, ballet, 1823

== His portrait ==
The portraitist depicts Dugazon as a "figure" of the Opéra comique in the early 19th century. The marble bust represents his friend Étienne Nicolas Méhul. Sculpted by Lorenzo Bartolini, the bust is dedicated to Rodolphe Kreutzer. The other bust, at the top right of the painting, is in bronze. It represents Henri Montan Berton, whose student Dugazon was.

The portrait is thus that of a celebrity of the time. The painter placed Dugazon in front of a pianoforte on which a sheet music, two books with green covers, and an inkwell remind us that he is a composer. Dugazon holds his cantata Héros in his hand.

== See also ==
- Dugazon family
