= Auguste Vestris =

French dancer (1760–1842)

- Print of Auguste Vestris dancing
- Born: Marie-Jean-Augustin Vestris; 27 March 1760; Paris, France
- Died: 5 December 1842 (aged 82); Paris, France
- Occupation: Dancer
- Children: Armand Vestris
- Career
- Former groups: Paris Opera Ballet

Marie-Jean-Augustin Vestris, known as Auguste Vestris (27 March 1760 – 5 December 1842), was a French dancer.

He was born in Paris, the illegitimate son of Gaétan Vestris and Marie Allard. His father was a Florentine dancer who had joined the Paris Opéra in 1748, his mother was a French dancer in the same theatre. He was dubbed "le dieu de la danse", (the god of dance), a popular title bestowed on the leading male dancer of each generation (previous 'Gods of the Dance' included his father Gaétan and Gaétan's teacher, Louis Dupré).

He made his debut at the Paris Opéra (as had his mother, Marie Allard) in the third divertissement of the pastorale La Cinquantaine (written by Desfontaines-Lavallée and set to music by Jean-Benjamin de La Borde) in 1772 and was immediately recognized for his talent. He was accepted as a regular member of the troupe in 1775, became a soloist in 1776, a "premier danseur" (principal dancer) in 1778, and finally he was appointed "premier sujet de la danse" (roughly corresponding to modern étoile) in 1780, holding this rank in the company for the next 36 years.

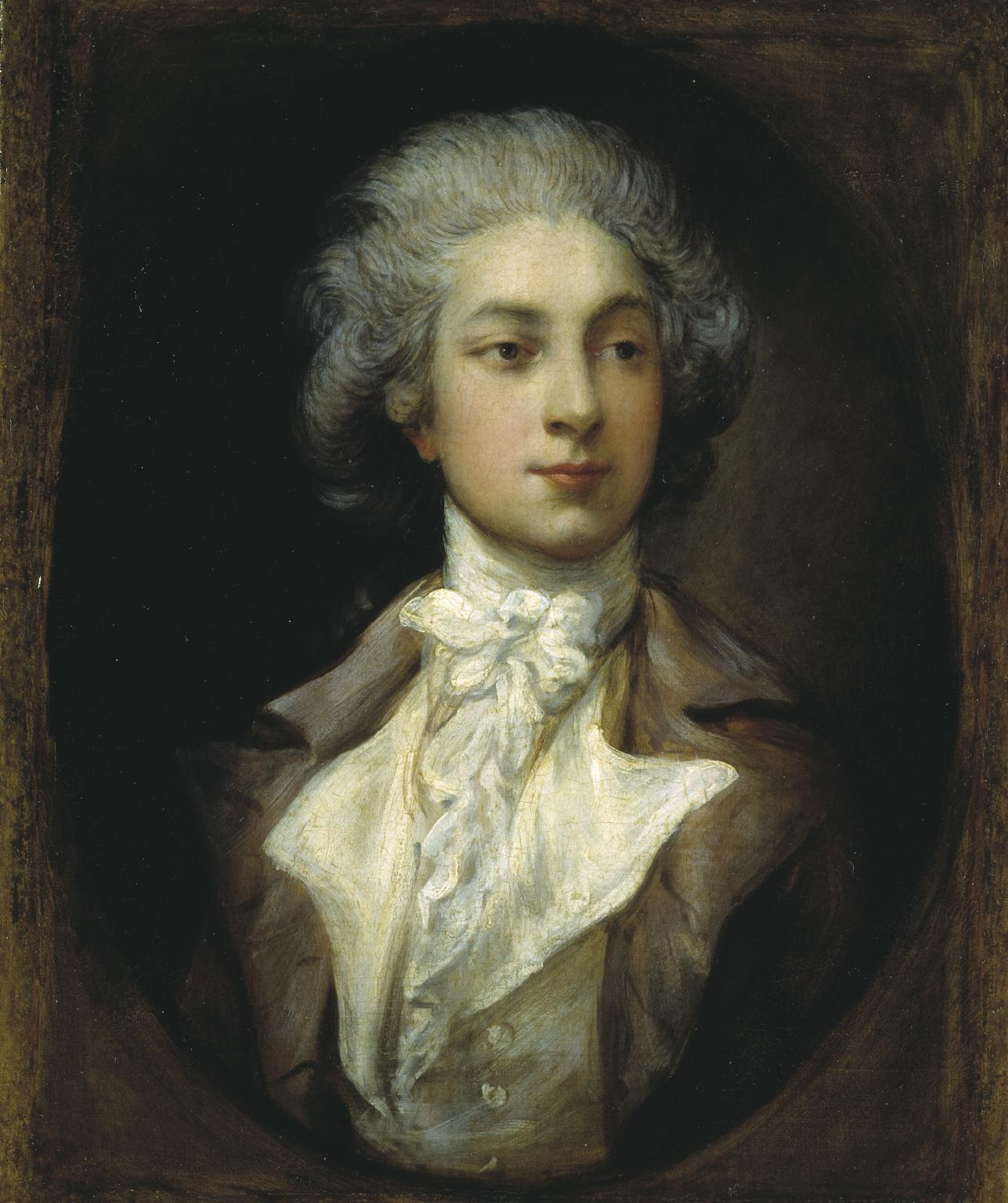
Auguste Vestris, by Thomas Gainsborough, ca 1781

After his retirement he trained many famous dancers of the 19th century including August Bournonville, Marius Petipa, Lucien Petipa, Fanny Elssler, Jules Perrot and Marie Taglioni. It was with Taglioni in 1835 that he performed a minuet at the age of 75.

Auguste Vestris is not to be confused with his son, Armand Vestris, who married the English actress-manager Lucia Elizabeth Vestris in 1813. Both Armand and a cousin Charles Vestris, son of a brother of Auguste's, were also dancers.
