= Jean-Henri Gourgaud =

French actor

Dugazon
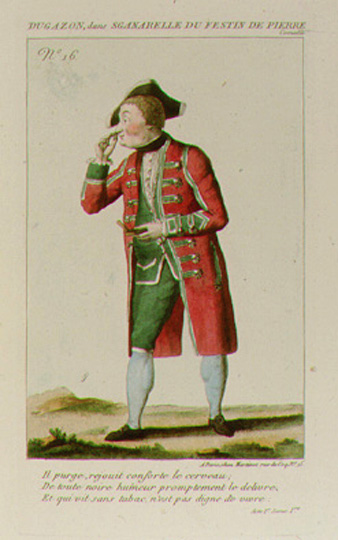
- Jean-Henri Gourgaud, called Dugazon, in Le Festin de Pierre by Molière (1790). Priv. coll
- Born: Jean-Henri Gourgaud; 14 November 1746; Marseille
- Died: 18 October 1809 (aged 62); Sandillon
- Occupation: Actor

Jean-Henri Gourgaud (15 November 1746 – 19 October 1809) was a French actor under the stage name Dugazon, the son of Pierre-Antoine Gourgaud, the director of military hospitals there and also an actor.

He began his career in the provinces, making his debut in 1770 at the Comédie Française, where he aspired to leading comedy roles. He pleased the public at once and was made sociétaire in 1772. Dugazon was an ardent revolutionist, helped the schism which divided the company, and went with Talma and the others to what became the Théâtre de la République. After the closing of this theatre and the dissolution of the Comédie Française, he took refuge at the Théâtre Feydeau until he returned to the restored Comédie in 1799. He retired in 1805, and died insane at Sandillon.

Dugazon wrote three comedies of a political character, performed at the Théâtre de la République. He married, in 1776, Louise-Rosalie Lefebvre, but was soon divorced and then married again. Together they had a child, composer Gustave Dugazon.

Dugazon's sister, Marie Rose Gourgaud (1743–1804), was an actress who first played at Stuttgart, where she married Angiolo (Angelo) Vestris, brother of Gaétano Vestris, the dancer. Under the protection of the dukes of Choiseul and Duras, she was commanded to make her debut at the Comédie Française in 1768, where she created important parts in a number of tragedies.

== See also ==
- Troupe of the Comédie-Française in 1790
