= Blanche Alziari de Roquefort =

French actress

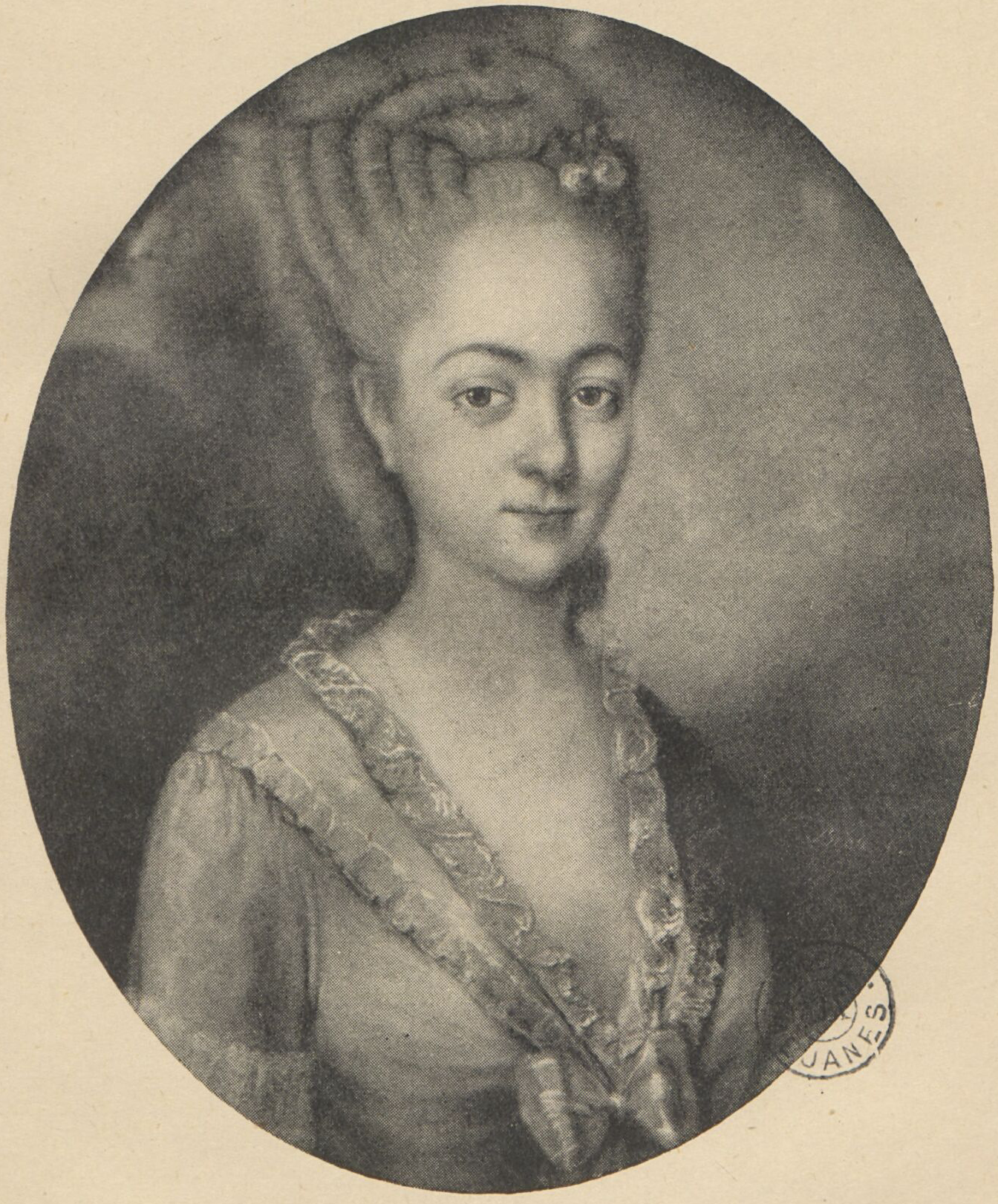
Blanche Alziari de Roquefort

Blanche Alziari de Roquefort (1752–1836), stage name Mademoiselle Saint-Val cadette, was a French stage actress.

She was the sister of Pauline Alziari de Roquefort, stage name Mademoiselle Saint-Val aînée.

She was engaged at the Comédie-Française in 1772. She became a Sociétaires of the Comédie-Française in 1776. She retired in 1792.

She was a talented tragedienne, but the rivalry with Mademoiselle Raucour and Rose Vestris resulted in her seldom achieving big roles at the theatre. She was, however, very popular among the audience, and performed several successful tours.

One of her most acclaimed roles was the role of the countess in Mariage de Figaro by Beaumarchais, in 1784.
