= Amalia Brugnoli =

Italian ballet dancer

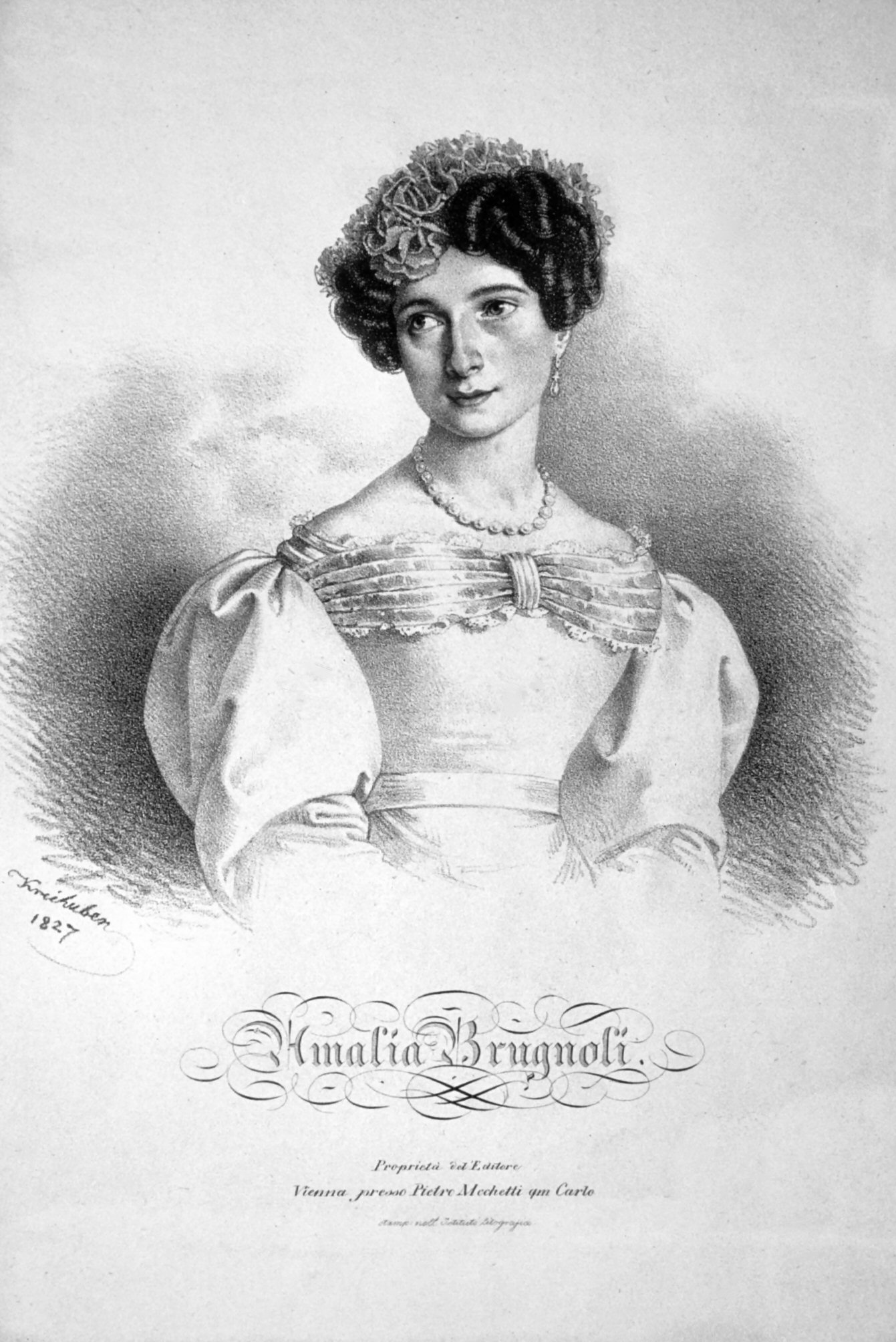
Amalia Brugnoli sketched by Josef Kriehuber (1827)

Amalia Brugnoli (1803–1892) was an Italian ballerina. Brugnoli is said to have been the first dancer to have used the pointe technique when in 1823, she performed on full pointe in Armand Vestris' La Fée et le Chevalier in Vienna.

== Biography ==
Born in Milan on February 4, 1803, Brugnoli was the daughter of the dancers Paolo and Giuseppa Brugnoli. After training at La Scala's ballet academy, she partnered Armand Vestris, dancing with him in his La Fée et le Chevalier (The Fairy and the Knight) which was staged in Vienna in 1822. It was here that Brugnoli first employed the pointe technique or toe dancing. Marie Taglioni, who was present, was so impressed by the style that she determined to perfect it herself. Although Taglioni commented on the "extraordinary things" Brugnoli achieved "on the point of her foot", she did not find her performance graceful because "in order to rise on pointe, she had to make great efforts with her arms".

In 1828, while performing at the Teatro di San Carlo in Naples, she met the dancer and choreographer Paolo Samengo whom she married and adopted as her dancing partner. In 1832, she appeared with him at the King's Theatre, London where her pointwork was highly acclaimed.
