= Armand Vestris =

French dancer and choreographer

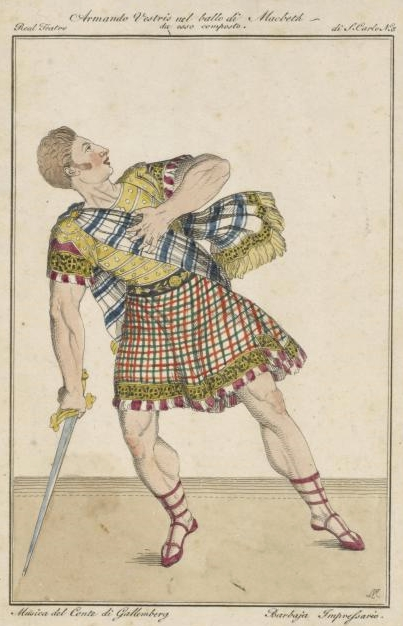
Armand Vestris in Macbeth, ballet of his composition on a music by Wenzel Robert von Gallenberg, at the Teatro San Carlo in Naples circa 1819.

Auguste-Armand Vestris (1788 or 1786, 1787, or 1795 Paris – 17 May 1825, Vienna) was an early 19th-century French dancer and choreographer.

The son of Auguste Vestris and (if the year of birth is 1795) dancer Anne-Catherine Augier, called Aimée (1777–1809), he studied dance with his grandfather Gaétan and made his first appearance on the stage of the Opéra de Paris at age four, alongside his father and his grandfather.

He danced in Italy and in Portugal, then settled in London in 1809. A ballet master at King's Theatre from 1813 to 1816, he later moved to Vienna where he died. In his 1823 ballet La Fée et le Chevalier, ballerina Amalia Brugnoli performed for the first time on full pointe (amazing, among others, a very young Marie Taglioni).

In 1813, he married Lucia Elizabeth Bartolozzi (1797-1856), who would become a famous singer, actress and theatre manager known under the stage name "Madame Vestris", from whom he separated in 1817, taking his pupil Julia Mori to Naples.
