= London Assurance =

Play written by Dion Boucicault

- Original language: English
- Written by: Dion Boucicault, John Brougham
- Genre: Comedy
- Setting: London and Oak Hall

Premiere
- Date: 4 March 1841
- Place: Theatre Royal, Covent Garden, London

London Assurance (originally titled Out of Town) is a five-act comedy co-authored by Dion Boucicault and John Brougham. While the play was collaboratively written by both playwrights, after the play's initial premiere Broughman, who originated the role of Dazzle, relinquished his authorship rights to the work in a lawsuit settlement and left the production. It was the second play that Boucicault wrote but his first to be produced. Its first production was by Charles Matthews and Madame Vestris's company and ran from 4 March 1841 at the Theatre Royal, Covent Garden. It was Boucicault's first major success.

== Characters ==
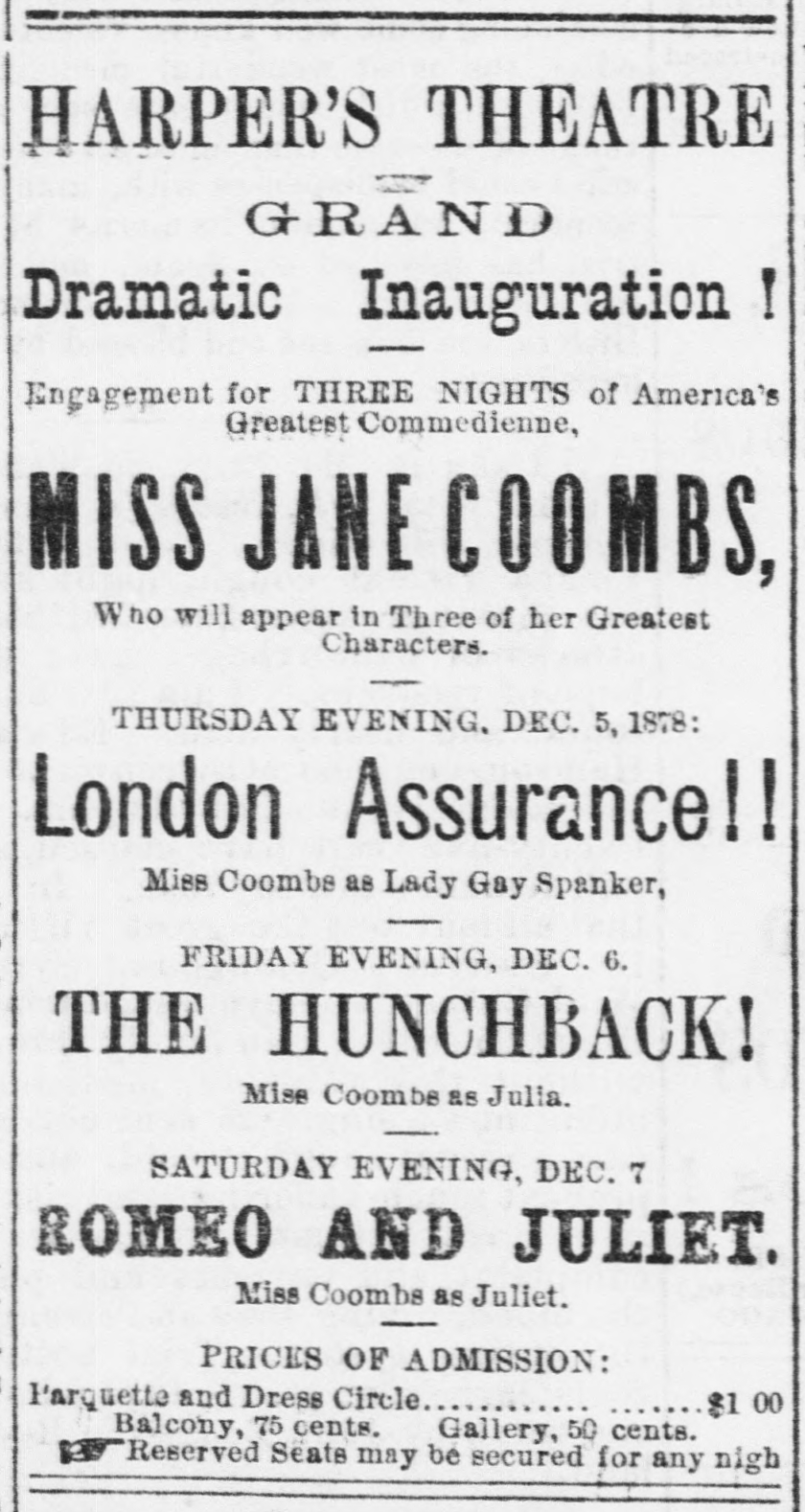
Miss Jane Coombs as Lady Gay Spanker at the Harper′s Theatre, 1878

- Sir Harcourt Courtly, cultured 57-year-old fop
- Charles Courtly, his dissolute son
- Dazzle, Charles's equally dissolute companion
- Max Harkaway, country squire
- Grace Harkaway, Max's 18-year-old niece, betrothed to Sir Harcourt
- Lady Gay Spanker, horse-riding virago
- Mr. Adolphus "Dolly" Spanker, her ineffectual husband
- Mark Meddle, lawyer
- Pert, Grace's maid
- Cool, Charles's valet
- James (Simpson)
- Martin, servant to the Courtlys
- Solomon Isaacs, moneylender, in pursuit of Charles

== Plot ==
=== Act 1 ===
Charles and Dazzle arrive at Sir Harcourt's London home after a night on the town and manage to avoid Harcourt with Cool's help; Harcourt still believes that Charles is a clean-living innocent. Max arrives to make the final arrangements for Harcourt's marriage to Max's niece Grace. Grace's late father, Max's brother, has made Grace's inheritance contingent on her marrying Harcourt; if she does not, it will pass to Charles. In return, Harcourt has financially helped him. Harcourt leaves and Dazzle bumps into Max, gaining himself an invitation to Oak Hall in Gloucestershire, Max's country house, and Charles will accompany him on the trip.

=== Act 2 ===
At Oak Hall, Grace tells her maid Pert about her acceptance of marriage to the aged Sir Harcourt and explains her view of love as an "epidemic madness". Charles and Dazzle arrive; Charles does not know of his father's marriage plans and immediately starts courting Grace. Harcourt arrives and Charles tells him that he is actually named Augustus Hamilton and merely bears a remarkable likeness to Charles. His father is convinced for a time.

=== Act 3 ===
Lady Gay Spanker and her husband "Dolly" arrive, and Sir Harcourt immediately falls in love with the former. Grace begins to fall in love with Charles/Augustus in spite of herself. When Lady Gay interrupts their courtship, Charles easily persuades the lady to distract Sir Harcourt from marriage to Grace by apparently accepting his affections. Charles leaves as 'Augustus', returning as Charles to tell Grace that 'Augustus' has been killed, to see if she really loves him, whilst Lady Gay and Sir Harcourt plan to elope.

=== Act 4 ===
The elopement is frustrated by Max, Dolly and the local lawyer Meddle. Dolly challenges Sir Harcourt to a duel. Sir Harcourt realises he has been duped and resolves to release Grace from their marriage contract.

=== Act 5 ===
Max prevents the duel and Grace insists on going through with the marriage to Sir Harcourt, as a ruse to force Charles's hand. Charles's creditors catch up with him. Dolly forgives Gay and Sir Harcourt finds out his son's true nature as well as acceding to Charles's marriage to Grace.

== Style ==
The play is considered an intermediate point between the 18th-century comedies of Richard Brinsley Sheridan and Oliver Goldsmith on the one hand and Oscar Wilde's The Importance of Being Earnest on the other.

== Production history ==
The play's first production ran for three months, with Madame Vestris as Grace Harkaway and Charles Mathews (replacing John Brougham who originated the role) as Dazzle, and was soon followed (from 11 October 1841, at the Park Theatre) by its first New York production, with Charlotte Cushman as Lady Gay Spanker.

According to casting notes from Methuen & Co Ltd's 1971 publication of the play, the Royal Shakespeare Company produced the show with director Ronald Eyre. The first performance was on 23 June 1970, and featured Donald Sinden as Sir Harcourt Courtly, Michael Williams as Charles, Judi Dench as Grace and Barrie Ingham as Dazzle which transferred to the Albery Theatre in London and had a run at the Palace Theatre on Broadway in New York. Eyre was nominated for a Tony Award for his directing and Sinden was the first recipient of the Broadway Drama Desk Special Award. A 1974 production saw Roger Rees take on the role of Charles, and Dinsdale Landen play Dazzle.

In 1976, the play was adapted for television by the BBC for their Play of the Month series, with Anthony Andrews as Charles Courtly and Landen reprising his role of Dazzle. It also featured Judy Cornwell as Lady Gay, James Bree as her husband Adolphus, Charles Gray as Sir Harcourt, Jan Francis as Grace, Clifford Rose as Cool and Nigel Stock as Max.

A 1989 stage production at the Chichester Festival Theatre (directed by Sam Mendes and featuring Paul Eddington as Sir Harcourt) later transferred to London. Its cast also included John Warner as Adolphus. Other productions include one at the Royal Exchange Theatre, Manchester in 2004, and a 2008 production at the Watermill Theatre in Bagnor, which toured to Guildford.

In 1991, the play was adapted for radio and directed by Sue Wilson on BBC Radio 4, with Daniel Massey as Sir Harcourt, Elizabeth Spriggs as Lady Gay, Samantha Bond as Grace, Reece Dinsdale as Charles Courtly and Sir Michael Hordern as Sir Charles Crawford.

The Royal National Theatre revived the play in March 2010, directed by Nicholas Hytner and featuring Simon Russell Beale as Sir Harcourt and Fiona Shaw as Lady Gay. A live performance was simulcast to cinemas around the world through their NTLive! program.

== Sources ==
- Templeman Library, University of Kent
- Stratford Festival
