= Pierre-Antoine Gourgaud =

French actor

Pierre-Antoine Gourgaud (29 April 1706, in Paris – 1 March 1774, in Paris), stage name Dugazon père (to distinguish him from his son Dugazon), was a French actor.

Patriarch of a large acting dynasty, Dugazon advised Louis XIV on buildings, bridges and lodges. He left his birthplace around 1730 and it was probably then that he became an actor.

He married Marie-Catherine Dumay in Lille on 18 November 1734 and stayed in that city until 1739, apart from a two-year stay in Brussels as director of the Théâtre de la Monnaie. On 11 December 1739, he débuted at the Comédie-Française but was not received into its company.

From 1742 to 1749, he acted in Marseille where, among other theatrical engagements, he was director of hospitals for the armée d'Italie. Returning to his nomadic lifestyle, he acted at Bordeaux and Bayonne, before being thoroughly engaged in Stuttgart in 1760. He then directed the theatre at Montpellier during the 1769-1770 season and died in Paris in 1774.

At least two of his children took up a theatrical career :

- Françoise-Rose Gourgaud, called Madame Vestris (1743–1804)
- Jean-Henri Gourgaud (1746–1809)

Preceded by Nicolas Huau	director of the Théâtre de la Monnaie; 1736–1738	Succeeded by Louis Desjardins, stage name Beaupré
