= Pierre-Joseph Bernard =

French military man and poet

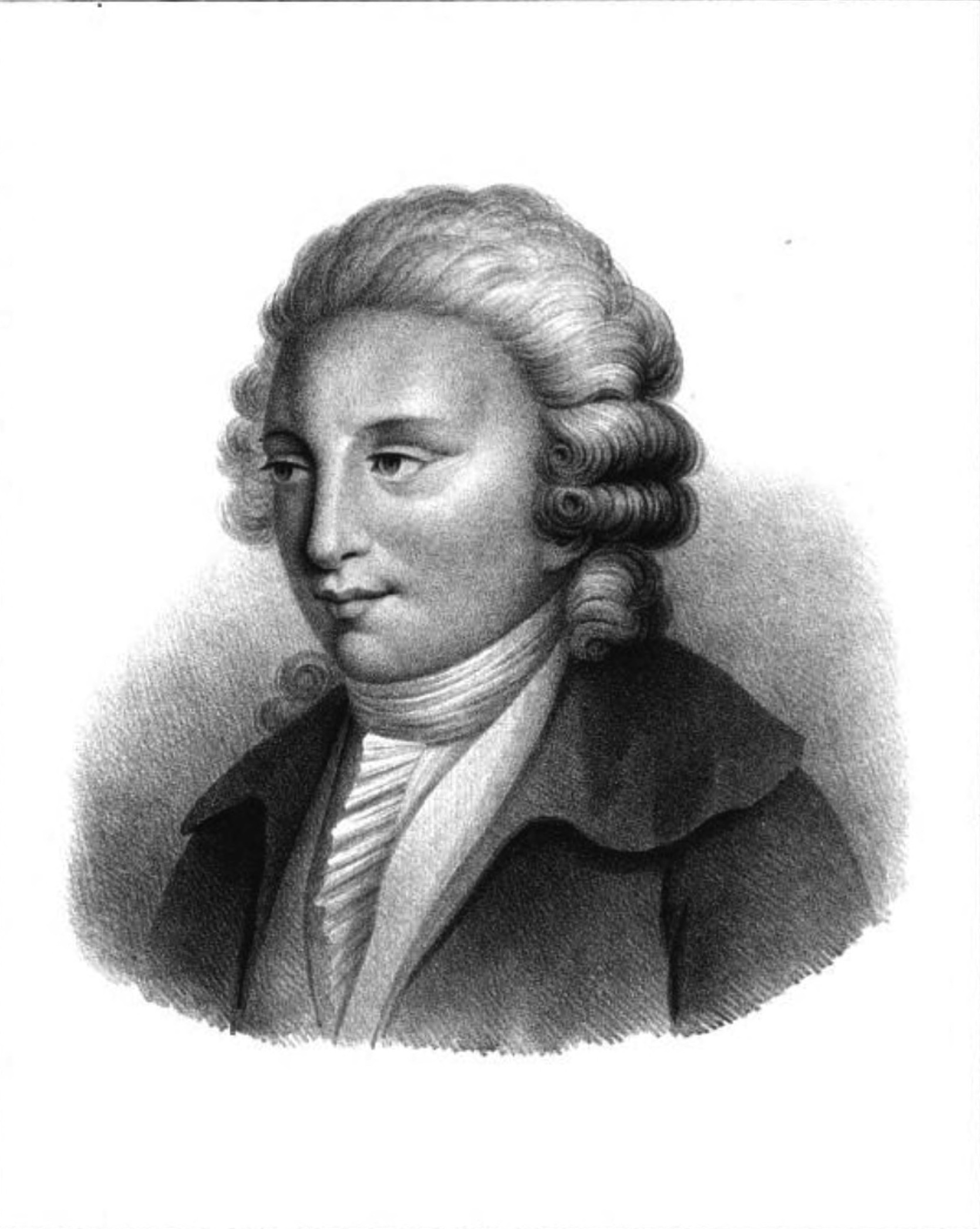
Pierre-Joseph Bernard

Pierre-Joseph Bernard (26 August 1708 – 1 November 1775), called Gentil-Bernard by Voltaire for the measured grace of his discreetly erotic verses, was a French military man and salon poet with the reputation of a rake, the author of several libretti for Rameau. Mme de Pompadour arranged to have him appointed a royal librarian, at the château de Choisy, where she had a little pavilion built for him.

He was born in Grenoble. He received a Jesuit education at Lyon and joined the staff of Marshal François de Franquetot de Coigny, rising to become the Marshal's chief secretary and serving him in this capacity for a decade. On his return he was taken up by the young Mlle Poisson, not yet marquise de Pompadour. His libretto for Jean-Philippe Rameau's Castor et Pollux (1737), a resounding success, rendered him fashionable in the salons. He translated Ovid's Ars amatoria (L'Art de l'Amour) but never intended to publish it, or much else of his fugitive verses. The publisher Leroux noted it in the salons where Bernard often declaimed it, and printed it. Bernard was also known for his Epistle to Claudine.

For Rameau Bernard also provided libretti for the operas Les surprises de l'Amour (1748) and Anacréon (1757).

His poem "Ô! Fontenay" was set as a romance by Joseph Denis Doche. In his book of biographical essays, Arsène Houssaye devoted a chapter to Gentil-Bernard, the "French Anacreon".

After some years either senile or gently mad, he died at Choisy-le-Roi in 1775. Arsène Houssaye asserted that "the poor poet had a devout niece for his heir, who burnt everything as a sacrifice except the will."
