= Lucia Elizabeth Vestris =

British actress, contralto and theatre manager (1797–1856)

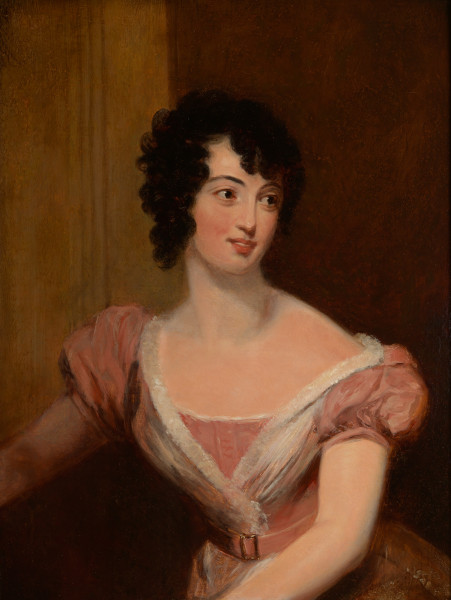
- by Robert William Buss
- Born: Elizabetta Lucia Bartolozzi; 3 March 1797; London
- Died: 8 August 1856 (aged 59); London
- Years active: 1815–1854
- Spouses: Armand Vestris (1813–1817); Charles James Mathews (1838–1856; her death)

Lucia Elizabeth Vestris (née Elizabetta Lucia Bartolozzi; 3 March 1797 – 8 August 1856) was a British actress and a contralto opera singer, appearing in works by Mozart and Rossini, among others. While popular in her time, she was more notable as a theatre producer and manager. After accumulating a fortune from her performances, she leased the Olympic Theatre in London and produced a series of burlesques and extravaganzas, especially popular works by James Planché, for which the house became famous. She also produced his work at other theatres she managed.

== Early life and education ==
She was born in London in 1797, the first of the two daughters of German pianist Theresa Jansen Bartolozzi and Italian art dealer Gaetano Stefano Bartolozzi. Her father was a musician and a son of immigrant artist Francesco Bartolozzi who had made his name as an engraver, being appointed as Royal Engraver to the king. Gaetano Bartolozzi was a successful art dealer, and the family moved to Europe in 1798 when he sold off his business. They spent time in Paris and Vienna before reaching Venice, where they found that their estate had been looted during the French invasion. They returned to London to start over, where Gaetano found a new venture which is to teach drawing. On the other hand, his wife Therese gave piano lessons to support her daughters.

Lucia studied music and was noted for her voice and dancing ability. Age nearly 17, she was married (28 January 1814; St Martin's Church, London) to the French ballet dancer, Auguste Armand Vestris, a scion of the great family of dancers of Florentine origin, but her husband deserted her in Paris for one of his pupils and then left for Naples four years later. Nevertheless, since she had started singing and acting professionally as "Madame Vestris", she retained the stage name throughout her career.

== Career ==
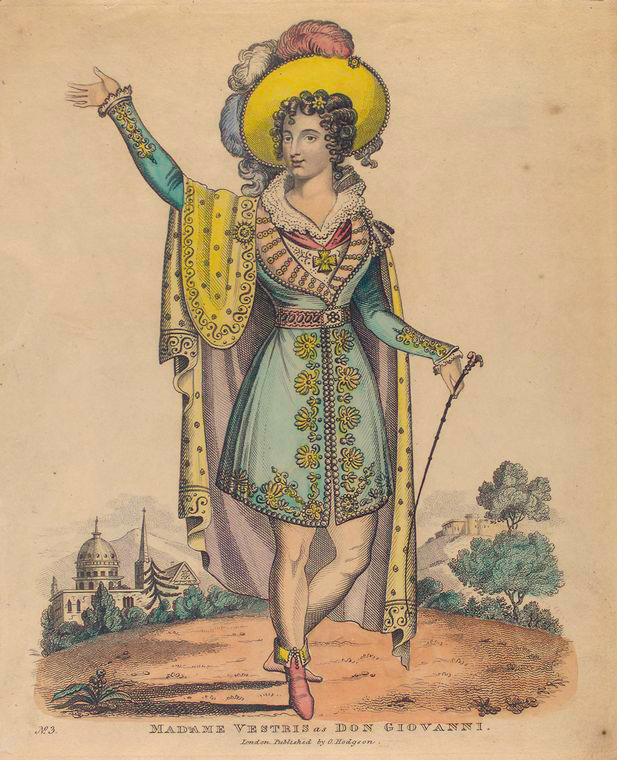
Madame Vestris as Don Giovanni in W.T. Moncrieff's Giovanni in London, Hand-coloured etching, c. 1820

In 1815, at age 18, her contralto voice and attractive appearance gained Madame Vestris her first leading role in Italian opera in the title-role of Peter Winter's II ratto di Proserpina at the King's Theatre. She also sang in 1816 in Martín y Soler's Una cosa rara and performed the roles of Dorabella and Susanna in Mozart's operas Così fan tutte, and The Marriage of Figaro. She had immediate success in both London and Paris. In the French capital city she occasionally appeared at the Théâtre-Italien and various other theatres. A legend that she performed as a tragic actress at the Théâtre-Français playing Camille opposite François-Joseph Talma in Corneille's Horace has however turned out to be untrue. The mistake was the result of a misreading of Talma's Mémoires wherein the actor narrates an episode in 1790 in which a 'Madame Vestris', not Eliza Lucia Vestris who was born several years later, but Françoise-Marie-Rosette Gourgaud, the wife of Angiolo Vestris, and thus a great-aunt-in-law of Eliza Lucia's husband, was once scandalized by Talma's showing up bare-legged on stage in an unusually realistic ancient-Roman costume. The legend was first stated in 1847, when Madame Vestris was still alive, by Thomas Marshall in his book on British actors and actresses, and, after being almost held up to ridicule by John Westland Marston in 1888, it was on the contrary taken as true by Joseph Knight in his article on Madame Vestris in the Dictionary of National Biography, and has since been regularly revived by the main following encyclopaedical sources. Finally, the legend has been refuted by modern biographers of Madame Vestris.

Her first hits in English were in 1820 at age 23 at the Drury Lane in Stephen Storace's Siege of Belgrade, and in Moncrieff's burlesque Giovanni in London, where she performed the male title-role of no less than Don Giovanni: the succès de scandale of this breeches performance in which she showed off her fabulously perfect legs, launched her career as a scandalous beauty. From then on she remained an extraordinary favourite in opera, musical farces, and comedies until her retirement in 1854. At the King's Theatre she sang in the English premieres of many Rossini operas, sometimes conducted by the composer himself: La gazza ladra (as Pippo, 1821), La donna del lago (as Malcolm Groeme, 1823), Ricciardo e Zoraide (as Zomira, 1823), Matilde di Shabran (as Edoardo, 1823), Zelmira (as Emma, 1824), and Semiramide (as Arsace, 1824). She excelled in "breeches parts," and she also performed in Mozart operas, such as Die Entführung aus dem Serail (Blonde) in 1827, and later, in 1842, The Marriage of Figaro (Cherubino), in a complete specially crafted English version by James Planché. She was credited with popularizing such new songs as "Cherry Ripe", "Meet Me by Moonlight Alone" (written by Joseph Augustine Wade), "I've been roaming," etc. She also took part in world premieres, creating the role of Felix in Isaac Nathan's comic opera The Alcaid or The Secrets of Office, (London, Little Theatre in the Haymarket, 1824), and, above all, that of Fatima in Oberon or The Elf King's Oath, "the Grand Romantic and Fairy Opera" by Carl Maria von Weber, which was staged at the Theatre Royal, Covent Garden on 12 April 1826.

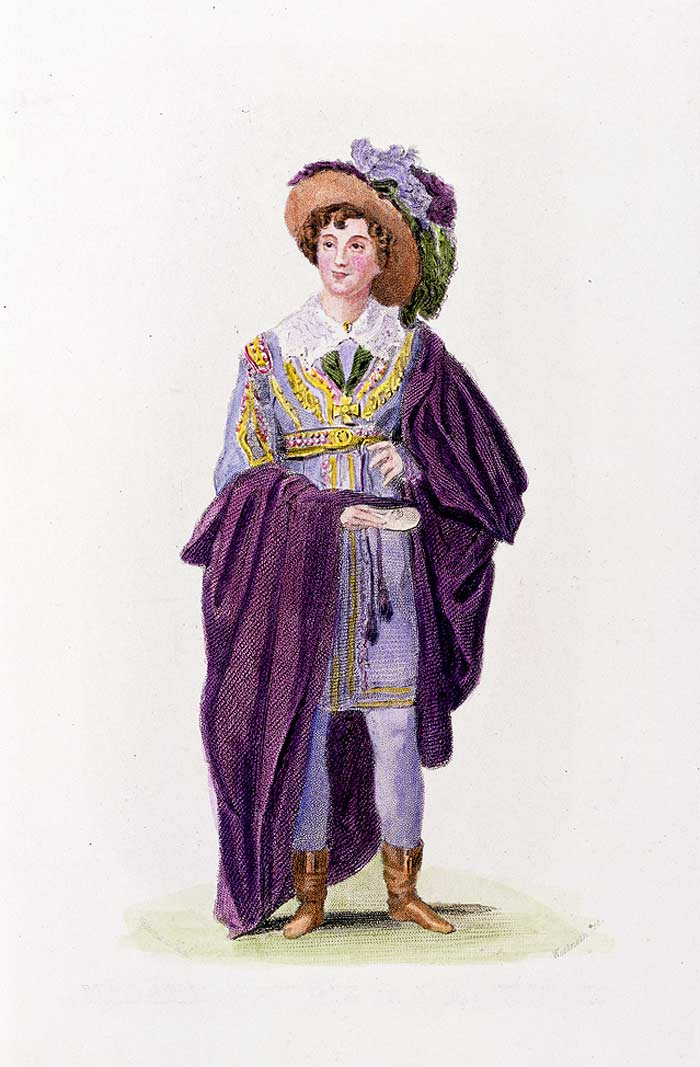
Madame Vestris as Felix in The Alcaid, coloured engraving, London, 1824

Despite her celebrity status and popularity, Madame Vestries was not met with total social acceptance for her breeches roles. Her revolutionary action as an actress spurred vicious attacks on her character by her more conservative contemporaries. Vestries' risqué activities onstage were taken to be representative of her own lack of morality and social purity. Disregarding public backlash, Madame Vestries found great financial achievement with her breeches roles and gained the ability to take a position of power within the theatre industry.

Women did not have as much influence over theatrical production as men, including the roles of management, ownership and administration. Though women had the experience and qualifications from past family ventures they were often not able to secure funding enough to finance their ventures in the capital-intensive industry. When Covent Garden management sought to reduce the acting payroll in 1830, however Vestris had accumulated a fortune from performing and was able to lease the Olympic Theatre from John Scott. There she began presenting a series of burlesques and extravaganzas—for which she made this house famous. She produced numerous works by the contemporary playwright James Planché, with whom she had a successful partnership, which included him contributing ideas for staging and costumes.

== Second marriage and subsequent career ==
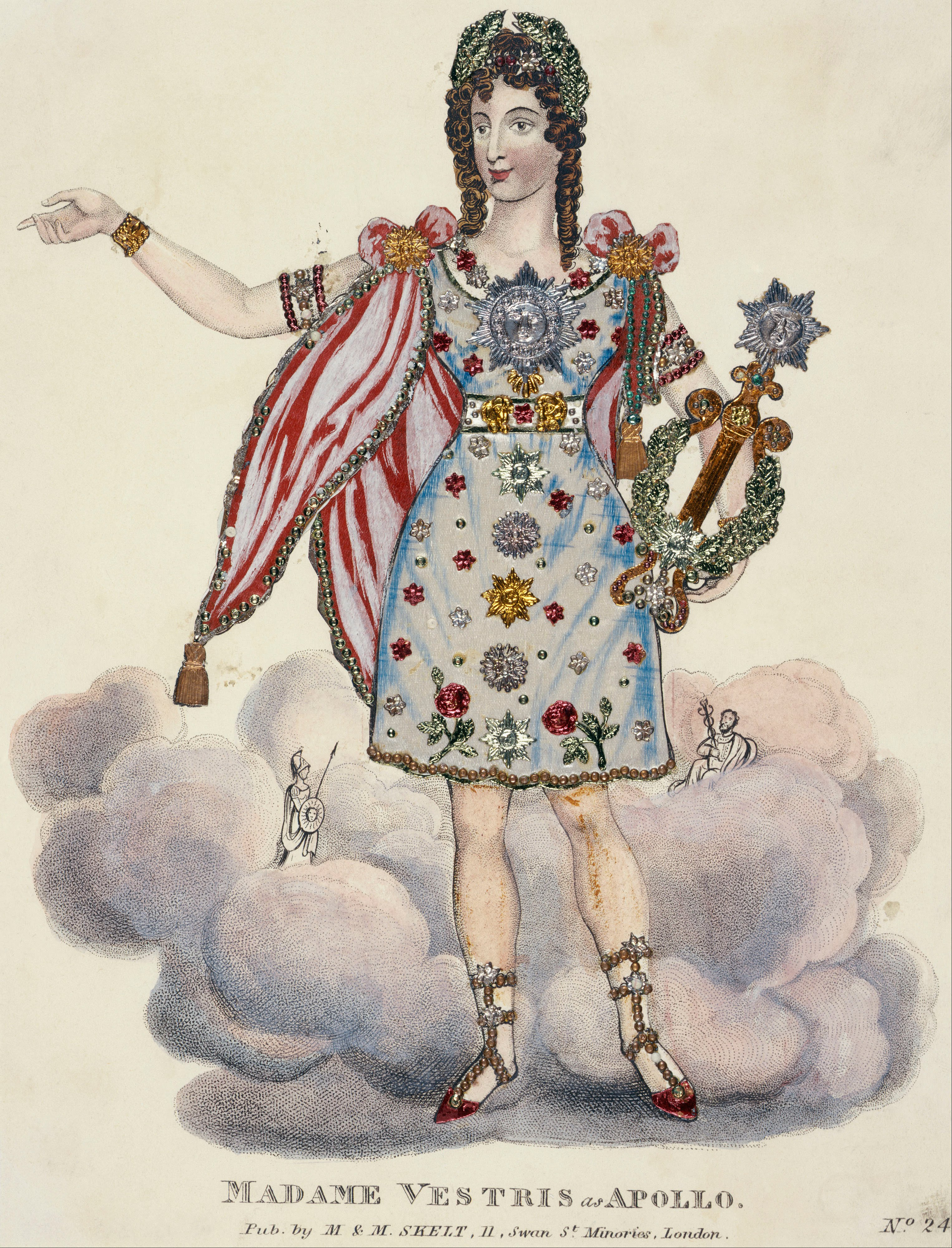
Tinsel print of Madame Vestris as Apollo, English, 1837–1840

She married in 1838 for the second time, to the British actor and former associate Charles James Mathews, just before leaving on tour with him for America. They cooperated in their subsequent managerial ventures, including the management of the Lyceum Theatre and the theatre in Covent Garden.

Mme Vestris and Mathews inaugurated their management of Covent Garden with the first-known production of Love's Labour's Lost since 1605; Vestris played Rosaline. In 1840 she staged one of the first relatively uncut productions of A Midsummer Night's Dream, in which she played Oberon. This began a tradition of female Oberons that lasted in the British theatre for seventy years.

In 1841 Vestris produced the highly successful Victorian farce London Assurance by Dion Boucicault, with possibly the first use of a "box set". The play has been popular ever since, receiving its most recent revival at the National Theatre in 2010.

She also introduced the soprano Adelaide Kemble to the theatre in English versions of Bellini's Norma and Mercadante's Elena da Feltre (renamed Elena Uberti). A daughter of John Kemble, actor-manager, and one of the theatre's owners, and niece of Sarah Siddons, Adelaide had a sensational but short career before retiring into marriage.

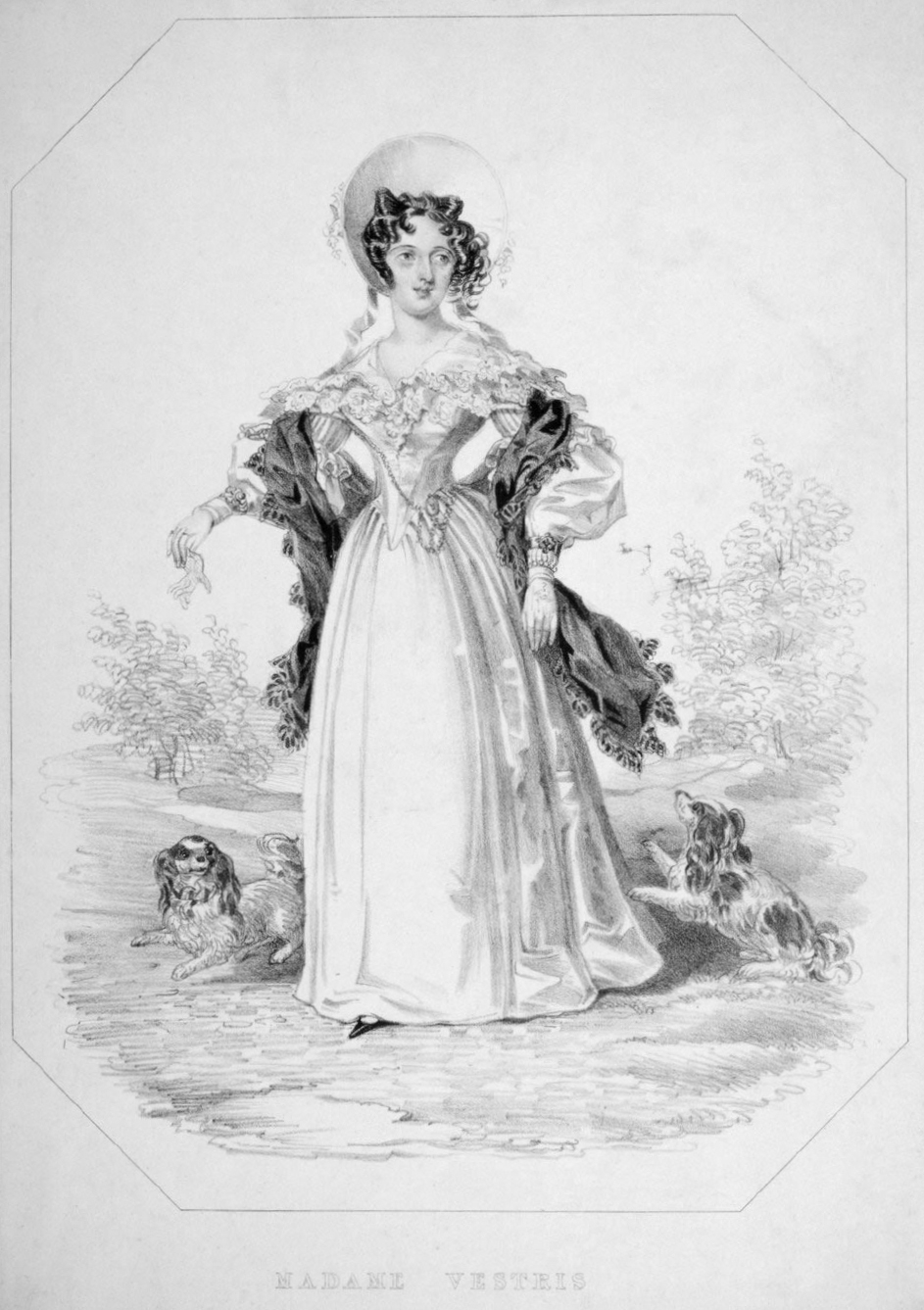
Lucia Elizabeth Vestris, accompanied by spaniels, lithograph c. 1831–1835

About her time in charge at Covent Garden, a note by the actor James Robertson Anderson reported in C.J. Mathews's autobiography, says:

Madame was an admirable manager, and Charles an amiable assistant. The arrangements behind the scenes were perfect, the dressing rooms good, the attendants well-chosen, the wings kept clear of all intruders, no strangers or crutch and toothpick loafers allowed behind to flirt with the ballet-girls, only a very few private friends were allowed the privilege of visiting the green-room, which was as handsomely furnished as any nobleman's drawing-room, and those friends appeared always in evening dress....There was great propriety and decorum observed in every part of the establishment, great harmony, general content prevailed in every department of the theatre, and universal regret was felt when the admirable managers were compelled to resign their government.

Another contemporary actor George Vandenhoff in Dramatic Reminiscences also bears testimony to the fact that: ‘To Vestris's honour, she was not only scrupulously careful not to offend propriety by word or action, but she knew very well how to repress any attempt at double-entendre, or doubtful insinuation, in others. The green-room in Covent Garden was a most agreeable lounging place, from which was banished every word or allusion that would not be tolerated in a drawing-room.’

In the late 1840s Vestris began to appear less and less on the stage because of the debts she and her husband owed and also because she began to raise her late sister's children. Her last performance (1854) was for Mathews' benefit, in an adaptation of Madame de Girardin's La Joie fait peur, called Sunshine through Clouds. She died on 8 August 1856 at her home in Fulham, Grove Lodge.

Her musical accomplishments and education were not sufficient to distinguish her in grand opera, and in high comedy she was only moderately successful. But in plays like Loan of a Lover, Paul Pry, Naval Engagements, etc., she was "delightfully arch and bewitching." However, many an observer (and Chorley among them) "never quite forgave her for not becoming the greatest English operatic contralto of her age:"

About the same time it was that Madame Vestris made her last appearance on our Italian stage. There, if she had possessed musical patience and energy, she might have queened it; because she possessed (half Italian by birth) one of the most luscious of low voices—found, since Lear's time, excellent in woman—great personal beauty, and almost faultless figure, which she knew to adorn with consummate art—and no common stage address. – But a less arduous theatrical career pleased her better; and so she, too, could not—one might perhaps say, because she would not—remain on the Italian stage.

— Henry F. Chorley, Thirty Years' Musical Recollections, London, Hurst and Blackett, 1862

In an age where women were denied autonomy, and brought up to believe they could not manage their own lives and their own money, let alone run a business employing hundreds of people including both men and women, Vestris was a business-woman par excellence. She managed theatres; took plays on tour with a motley crew of actors, actresses and all the support staff; and only remarried, after her disastrous early experience with Vestris, when forced to by American authorities in order to allow her to bring her tour across their borders. Lucia Elizabeth Vestris was a prominent figure in the history of British theatre and customs in the nineteenth century.

She is buried at Kensal Green Cemetery.
