= Charles James Mathews =

British actor (1803–1878)

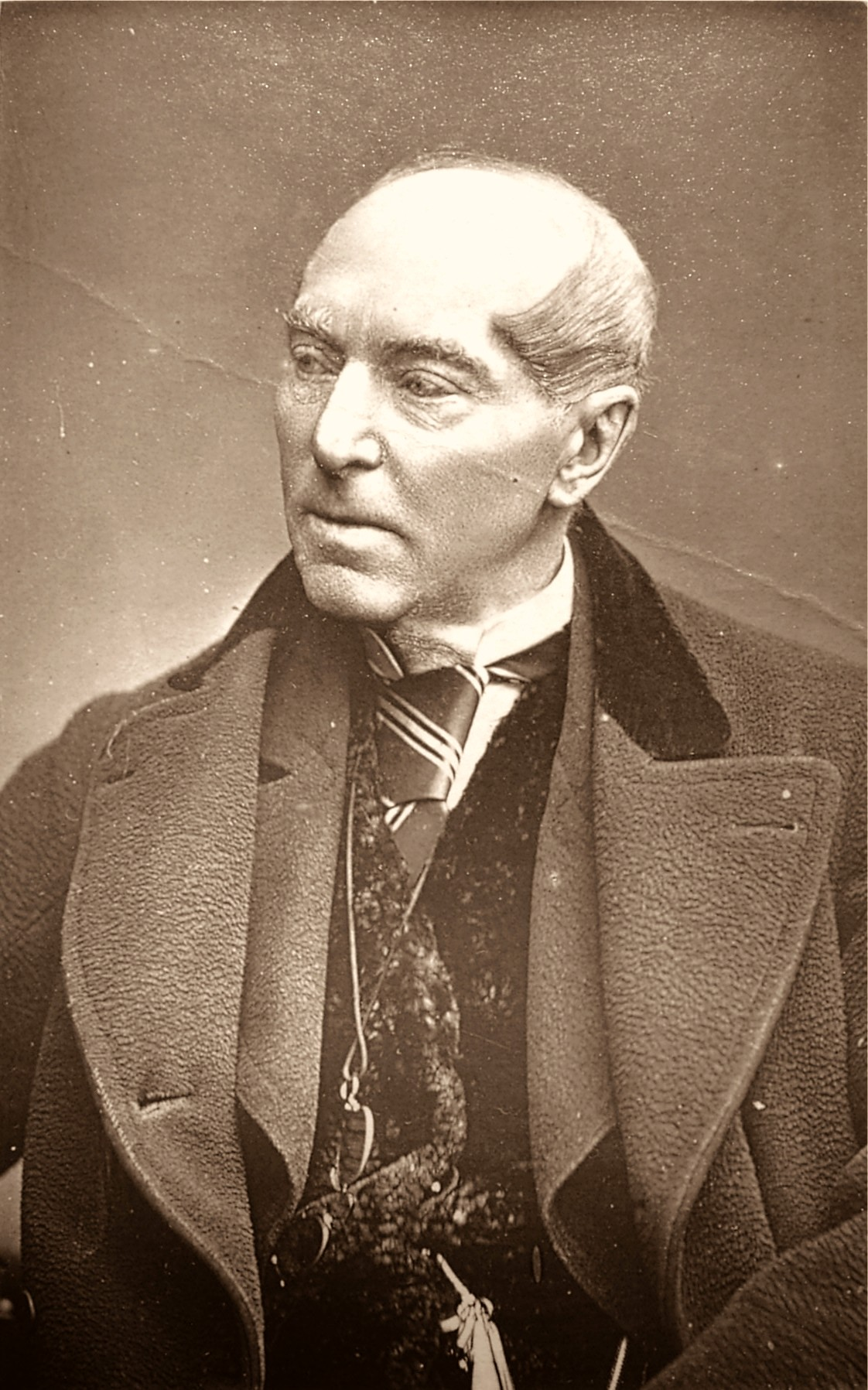
- Charles James Mathews
- Born: 26 December 1803; Liverpool, England
- Died: 24 June 1878 (aged 74)
- Occupation: Actor
- Spouses: Lucia Elizabeth Vestris (m. 1838; died 1856) A. H. Davenport (m. 1858)

Charles James Mathews (26 December 1803 – 24 June 1878) was a British actor. He was one of the few British actors to be successful in French-speaking roles in France. A son of the actor Charles Mathews, he achieved a greater reputation than his father in the same profession and also excelled at light comedy. He toured three times in the United States, and met and married his second wife there.

== Biography ==
Charles James Mathews was born in Liverpool. After attending Merchant Taylors' School, Northwood, he was articled as the architect Augustus Charles Pugin's apprentice. For some years, Mathews worked at this profession.

His first public appearance on the stage was made on 7 December 1835, at the Olympic Theatre in London, as George Rattleton in his own play The Humpbacked Lover, and as Tim Topple the Tiger in Leman Rode's Old and Young Stager.

== Marriage and family ==
In 1838, he married Madame Vestris, then lessee of the Olympic, as her second husband. That year he also toured the US, to lukewarm reviews. In 1856, Madame Vestris died.

The following year Mathews again visited the U.S., and there in 1858 he married a fellow widow, Mrs A. H. Davenport (Lizzie Weston), whose son Charles Willie West assumed his stepfather's surname by deed poll.

== Career ==
Mathews started managing the Olympic Theatre soon after his marriage to Mme Vestris, but did not succeed financially. Despite introducing innovations of more realistic and detailed scenery, his following management of the Theatre Royal, Covent Garden, and the Lyceum Theatre also had limited financial return. They did have quite a success with their production of the Victorian farce London Assurance (1841), commissioned for their company and written by Dion Boucicault. This was Boucicault's first major success.

As an actor in England, Mathews held a place in his unique vein of light eccentric comedy. He had an easy grace combined with "imperturbable solemnity", a combination which amused people; his humour was never broad, but always measured and restrained. He played the leading character in the plays: Game of Speculation, My Awful Dad, Cool as a Cucumber, Patter versus Clatter, and Little Toddlekins.

Mathews also used his time in the U.S. to collect impressions of American types and dialects, resulting in A Trip to America, a one-man stage review in which Mathews performed mimicries in character, including some in blackface.

After Mathews' return to England with his second wife, in 1861, they gave a series of "At Home" tabletop reviews at the Haymarket Theatre. These were nearly as popular as those of his father had been.

Charles James Mathews was one of the few English actors who successfully played French-speaking roles. In 1863 he appeared in Paris in a French version of his play Cool as a Cucumber, and was received with praise. He played there again in 1865 as Sir Charles Coldcream in the original play L'Homme blasé (the English version by Boucicault was known as Used Up.)

At age 66 in 1869, Mathews set out on a tour round the world, including a third visit to the U.S. He made his last appearance in New York at Wallack's Theatre on 7 June 1872, in H. J. Byron's Not such a Fool as He Looks.

After his return to England in 1872, he continued to act until within a few weeks of his death. His last appearance in London was at the Opéra Comique on 2 June 1877, in The Liar and The Cosy Couple. At Stalybridge he gave his last performance on 8 June 1878, when he played Adonis Evergreen in his comedy My Awful Dad.

Mathews died on 24 June 1878.
