= Pauline Alziari de Roquefort =

French actress

Pauline Alziari de Roquefort (1747–1830), stage name Mademoiselle Saint-Val aînée , was a French stage actress.

She was the sister of Blanche Alziari de Roquefort, stage name Mademoiselle Saint-Val cadette.

She was engaged at the Comédie-Française in 1766. She became a Sociétaires of the Comédie-Française in 1767. She retired in 1779.

She was a successful tragedienne and noted in the roles of queens. She succeeded Mademoiselle Clairon, who retired in 1766, but her delicate health forced her to decline many roles, and she was fired in favor of her rival Rose Vestris in 1779. This decision was not popular among the public, and she toured with great success in France and Europe until 1791.
