= Marie Allard =

French ballerina

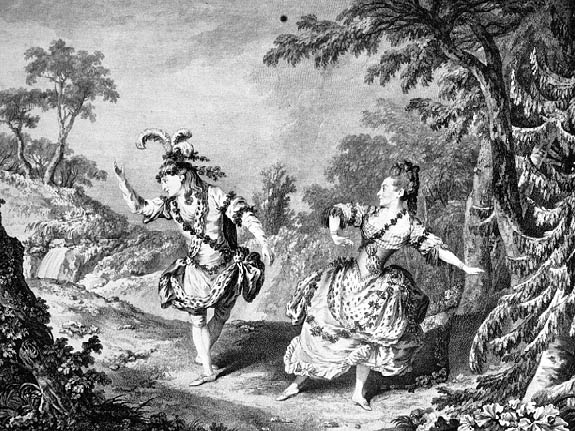
Print of Jean Dauberval and Allard in Sylvie as painted by Louis Carrogis Carmontelle

Marie Allard (1742–1802) was a French ballerina. She debuted in the Paris Opera in 1761.

== Early life ==
Marie Allard was born in 1742 to a poor family in Marseille. At the age of 10, she was offered to a Monsieur V. and the Comédie de Marseille. Her mother died two years later and Marie became a première danseuse (first dancer) of the Lyon opera. By the age of 14, she was employed at the Comédie-Française and lived in a small apartment in Paris.

== Career ==
In June 1761 Allard made her debut at the Paris Opera in Jean-Philippe Rameau's Zaïs. The audience and the young rakes Duc de Mazarin and Monsieur de Bontems were quite taken with her. In her first decade at the Paris Opera she danced 35 roles and received commendation for her pas de deux with Jean Dauberval in Sylvie. Allard and Vestris also taught dance to their son, who would become the leading male dancer of his generation. At one point, Allard's contract was suspended temporarily "on the ground that her deplorable habit of producing two children every eighteen months caused her to be constantly in a condition which was destructive of all stage effect." Her career started to decline as her son rose to fame and the committee asked her to retire in 1781.

== Personal life ==
Shortly after beginning her studies with balletmaster Gaétan Vestris, she became his lover. In 1760 she gave birth to a son, Auguste Vestris. Allard died from a stroke in 1802.
