= Gaetano Stefano Bartolozzi =

Italian artist and merchant (1757- 1821)

Gaetano Stefano Bartolozzi (1757–1821) was an Italian engraver, art dealer, and merchant. He was the son of the famous engraver Francesco Bartolozzi, a friend of Joseph Haydn, the husband of the outstanding pianist Theresa Jansen, and the father of the celebrated actress and theatre manager Lucia Elizabeth Vestris.

== See also ==
- Theresa Jansen Bartolozzi
