= Castor et Pollux =

1737 opera by Jean-Philippe Rameau

- Opera by Jean-Philippe Rameau
- Prologue, scene 2
- Librettist: Pierre-Joseph-Justin Bernard
- Language: French
- Based on: Castor and Pollux
- Premiere: 24 October 1737; Theatre in the Palais-Royal, Paris

Castor et Pollux (Castor and Pollux) is an opera by Jean-Philippe Rameau, first performed on 24 October 1737 by the Académie royale de musique at its theatre in the Palais-Royal in Paris. The librettist was Pierre-Joseph-Justin Bernard, whose reputation as a salon poet it made. This was the third opera by Rameau and his second in the form of the tragédie en musique (if the lost Samson is discounted). Rameau made substantial cuts, alterations and added new material to the opera for its revival in 1754. Experts still dispute which of the two versions is superior. Whatever the case, Castor et Pollux has always been regarded as one of Rameau's finest works.

== Composition history ==
Charles Dill proposes that Rameau had composed the 1737 opera just after working with Voltaire on the opera "Samson" that was never completed, after which he composed "Castor et Pollux" implementing Voltaire's aesthetics. For example, Voltaire sought the presentation of static tableaus that expressed emotion, as in the first act of the 1737 version which begins at the scene of Castor's tomb with a Chorus of Spartans singing "Que tout gemisse", followed by a recitative between Telaire and Phoebe in which the former is grieving the loss of her lover Castor, and culminating in Telaire's lament aria "Tristes apprets". Dill notes that in contrast, the 1754 version begins with much more background behind the story of Telaire's love for Castor and depicts his death at the end. The events in Act I of the 1737 version appear in Act II of the 1754 version. Dill claims that Voltaire was more interested in music than action in opera. Moreover, Dill notes a difference in the plots between in the two versions. In the 1737 version, the main concern is for the moral dilemma between love and duty that Pollux faces: should he pursue his love of Telaira or rescue his brother? Of course, he chooses the latter. In the 1754 version, Dill remarks that that plot is more concerned with the tests that Pollux must face: he must kill Lynceus, persuade Jupiter not to oppose his journey into the Underworld, and persuade Castor not to accept the gift of immortality.

While some scholars (such as Cuthbert Girdlestone, Paul-Marie Masson, and Graham Sadler) have assumed that the 1754 version was superior, Dill argues that Rameau made the changes of 1754 at a different point in his career. In 1737, he was testing the limits of tragedie lyrique; where in 1754, he had done more work with ballet-oriented genres in which he included striking musical compositions that delighted audiences. Thus, Dill proposes that there may have been some commercial concerns behind the change in aesthetic in 1754, as the revised version conformed more to the traditional Lullian aesthetic. He comments that while many see the revision as more innovative, in actuality the 1737 version was the more daring.

== Performance history and reception ==
Castor et Pollux appeared in 1737 while the controversy ignited by Rameau's first opera Hippolyte et Aricie was still raging. Conservative critics held the works of the "father of French opera", Jean-Baptiste Lully, to be unsurpassable. They saw Rameau's radical musical innovations as an attack on all they held dear and a war of words broke out between these Lullistes and the supporters of the new composer, the so-called Rameauneurs (or Ramistes). This controversy ensured that the premiere of Castor would be a noteworthy event.

Rameau had not altered the dramatic structure of Lully's tragédie lyrique genre: he retained the same five-act format with the same types of musical numbers (overture, recitative, air, chorus, and dance suites). He had simply expanded the musical resources available to French opera composers. While some welcomed Rameau's new idiom, more conservative listeners found it unappealing. On the one hand, Rameau's supporter Diderot (who later turned his loyalty elsewhere) remarked: "Old Lulli is simple, natural, even, too even sometimes, and this is a defect. Young Rameau is singular, brilliant, complex, learned, too learned sometimes; but this is perhaps a defect on the listeners." On the other hand, the complaint of the Lullistes was that Rameau's musical idiom was far more expressive that Lully's and went so far as to call it distastefully "Italianate" (by French standard). For example, where Lully has contained musical expression, Rameau's recitative style included much wider melodic leaps in contrast to Lully's more declamatory style. This can be heard clearly, for example, in the opening recitative between Phoebe and Cleone (Phoebe's servant) in Act I, scene 1 of the 1754 revised version. Additionally, he added a richer harmonic vocabulary that included ninth chords. Rameau's more demanding vocal style led to the remark (thought to be made by Rameau himself) that while Lully's operas required actors, his required singers. Over time, these changes became more and more acceptable to the French audience.

As it turned out, the opera was a success. It received twenty performances in late 1737 but did not reappear until the substantially revised version took to the stage in 1754. This time there were thirty performances and ten in 1755. Graham Sadler writes that "It was ... Castor et Pollux that was regarded as Rameau's crowning achievement, at least from the time of its first revival (1754) onwards."

Revivals followed in 1764, 1765, 1772, 1773, 1778, 1779 and 1780. The taste for Rameau's operas did not long outlive the French Revolution but extracts from Castor et Pollux were still being performed in Paris as late as 1792. During the nineteenth century, the work did not appear on the French stage, though its fame survived the general obscurity into which Rameau's works had sunk; Hector Berlioz admiringly mentioned the aria Tristes apprêts.

The first modern revival took place at the Schola Cantorum in Paris in 1903. Among the audience was Claude Debussy. The first UK performance, organised by Ronald Crichton, was given by the Oxford University Opera Club in November 1934 at Magdalen College, conducted by Robert Irving, with Dora Labbette, Maude Lloyd and John Kentish among the cast.

== Roles ==
| Role | Voice type | Premiere Cast, 24 October 1737 (Conductor: - ) |
|---|---|---|
| Castor | haute-contre | Monsieur Tribou |
| Pollux | bass | Claude Chassé |
| Télaïre | soprano | Mlle Pélissier |
| Phébé | soprano | Marie Antier |
| Jupiter | bass | Monsieur Dun |
| Vénus | soprano | Mlle Rabon |
| Mars | bass | Monsieur Le Page |
| Minerve | soprano | Mlle Eremans |

== Synopsis ==
The synopsis is based on 1737 version

=== Prologue ===
The allegorical prologue is unrelated to the main story. It celebrates the end of the War of the Polish Succession, in which France had been involved. In the prologue, Venus, goddess of love, subdues Mars, god of war, with the help of Minerva. In the 1754 revision, the prologue was eliminated.

=== Act 1 ===
Background note: Castor and Pollux are famous heroes. Despite being twin brothers, one of them (Pollux) is immortal and the other (Castor) is mortal. They are both in love with the princess Telaira (Télaïre), but she loves only Castor. The twins have fought a war against an enemy king, Lynceus (Lyncée) which has resulted in disaster: Castor has been slain. The opera opens with his funeral rites. Telaira expresses her grief to her friend Phoebe (Phébé) in Tristes apprêts, one of Rameau's most famous arias. Pollux and his band of Spartan warriors interrupt the mourning bringing the dead body of Lynceus who has been killed in revenge. Pollux confesses his love for Telaira. She avoids giving a reply, instead asking him to go and plead with his father Jupiter, king of the gods, to restore Castor to life.

=== Act 2 ===
Pollux expresses his conflicting emotions in the aria Nature, amour, qui partagez mon coeur. If he does what Telaira says and manages to persuade Jupiter to restore his brother to life, he knows he will lose the chance to marry her. But he finally yields to her pleas. Jupiter descends from above and Pollux begs him to bring Castor back to life. Jupiter replies he is powerless to alter the laws of fate. The only way to save Castor is for Pollux to take his place among the dead. Pollux, despairing that he will never win Telaira, decides to go to the Underworld. Jupiter tries to dissuade him with a ballet of the Celestial Pleasures led by Hebe, goddess of youth, but Pollux is resolute.

=== Act 3 ===
The stage shows the entrance to the Underworld, guarded by monsters and demons. Phoebe gathers the Spartans to prevent Pollux from entering the gate of the Underworld. Pollux refuses to be dissuaded, even though Phoebe declares her love for him. When Telaira arrives and she sees Pollux's true love for her, Phoebe realises her love will be unrequited. She urges the demons of the Underworld to stop him entering (Sortez, sortez d'esclavage/Combattez, Démons furieux). Pollux fights the demons with the help of the god Mercury and descends into Hades.

=== Act 4 ===
The scene shows the Elysian fields in the Underworld. Castor sings the aria Séjours de l'éternelle paix: the beautiful surroundings cannot comfort him for the loss of Telaira, neither can a Chorus of Happy Spirits. He is amazed to see his brother Pollux, who tells him of his sacrifice. Castor says he will only take the opportunity to revisit the land of the living for one day so he can see Telaira for the last time.

=== Act 5 ===
Castor returns to Sparta. When Phoebe sees him, she thinks Pollux is dead for good and commits suicide so she can join him in the Underworld. But Castor tells Telaira he only plans to remain alive with her for a single day. Telaira bitterly accuses him of never having loved her. Jupiter descends in a storm as a deus ex machina to resolve the dilemma. He declares that Castor and Pollux can both share immortality. The opera ends with the fête de l'univers ("Festival of the Universe") in which the stars, planets and sun celebrate the god's decision and the twin brothers are received into the Zodiac as the constellation of Gemini.

== Musical analysis ==
=== Act 1 ===
In the 1737 version, the first act opens with a tomb scene in which a chorus of Spartans mourns the death of their fallen king Castor who has been slain by Lynceus. The music in F minor features a descending tetrachord motive associated with lamentation since Claudio Monteverdi's Nymph's Lament (in this case it is chromatic: F-E-Eb-D-Db-C). Although Telaira's Tristes apprêts in scene 3 does not have the descending tetrachord feature, Cuthbert Girdlestone still calls it a lament. The air is in da capo form, whose B-section has a recitative-like quality. It features a bassoon obbligato part and a high register outburst on the word "Non!" that marks its high point. The march music for the entrance of Pollux and the Spartans is martial in character. With Lynceus's corpse at his feet, Pollux proclaims his brother avenged; the Spartans chorus then sings and dances in rejoice "Let Hell applaud this new turn! Let a mournful shade rejoice in it! The cry of revenge is the song of Hell.". The second air of the Spartans in C Major, as that allows for a trumpet obbligato part with all of its military associations. (Before valved instruments, the trumpet keys were C and D major.) The act concludes with a lengthy recitative in which Pollux professes his love for Telaira.

== The 1754 revisions ==
The prologue was completely cut; it was no longer politically relevant and the fashion for operas having prologues had died out. The opera no longer begins with Castor's funeral; a wholly new Act One was created explaining the background to the story: Telaira is in love with Castor but she is betrothed to Pollux, who is prepared to give her up to his brother when he finds out. Unfortunately the wedding celebrations are violently interrupted by Lynceus and a battle breaks out in which Castor is killed. Acts Three and Four were merged and the work as a whole shortened by cutting a great deal of recitative.

== Recordings ==
- Castor et Pollux (1737 version) Concentus Musicus Wien, Harnoncourt (Teldec, 1972)
- Castor et Pollux (1737 version) Les Arts Florissants, William Christie (Harmonia Mundi, 1993))
- Castor et Pollux (1754 version) English Bach Festival Singers and Orchestra, Farncombe (Erato, 1982)
- Castor et Pollux (1754 version) Aradia Ensemble; Opera in Concert Chorus, Kevin Mallon (Naxos, 2004)
- Castor et Pollux (1754 version) Les Talens Lyriques, Chorus of De Nederlandse Opera, Christophe Rousset (Opus Arte DVD, 2008)
- Castor et Pollux (1754 version) Ensemble Pygmalion, Raphaël Pichon (Hamonia Mundi, 2015)
- Castor et Pollux (1737 version) Soloists, Purcell Choir, Orfeo Orchestra, György Vashegyi (Alpha Classics, 2025)
