= Anna Heinel =

German ballerina (1753–1808)

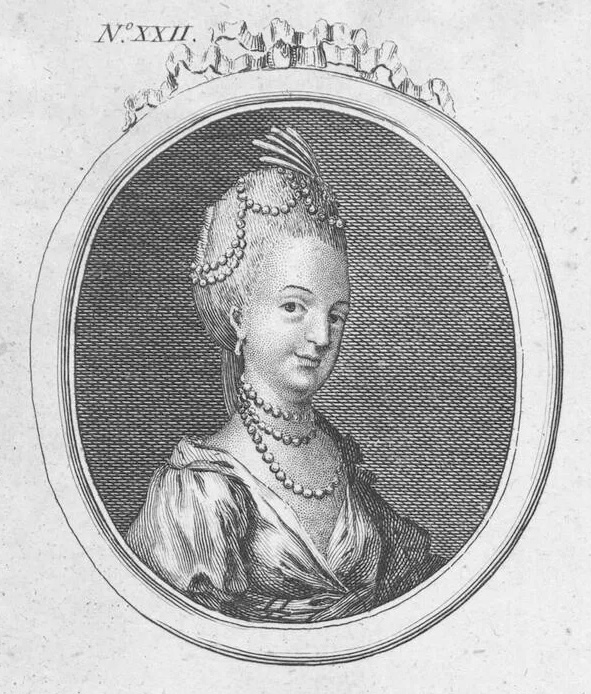
- Unknown artist etching, circa 1766-1787
- Born: Anna Friedrike Heinel; 4 October 1753; Bayreuth, Principality of Bayreuth, Holy Roman Empire
- Died: 17 March 1808 (aged 54); Paris, France
- Occupation: Dancer
- Spouse: Gaetan Vestris (m. 1792)
- Children: Adolphe Vestris
- Career
- Former groups: Paris Opera Ballet

Anna Friedrike Heinel (4 October 1753 – 17 March 1808) was a German ballerina who trained in Stuttgart. She enjoyed a highly successful career both in Paris and London.

== Biography ==
Born in Bayreuth, Heinel studied under Jean-Georges Noverre in Stuttgart where she made her début in 1767. The following year, she performed La Vénitienne in Paris where she was known as "La Reine de la danse" (Queen of the Dance). She went on to create roles in Omphale (1769), Hippomène et Atalante (1769), Le Prix de la Valeur (1771) and La Cinquantaine (1771). As a result of her exceptional ability (she is thought to have invented the pirouette), she became a threat to Gaétan Vestris with the result that she was relegated to secondary roles. She therefore left Paris for London where she danced for a time at the King's Theatre with Noverre.

In 1773, she returned to Paris where she was well received. There she danced in Orphée et Euridice (1774), Appelle et Campagne (1776), Alceste (1776), Armide (1777), Les Horaces (1777), La Fête de Village (1778), Iphigénie en Tauride (1779), Echo et Narcisse (1779), Atys (1780) and La Fête de Mirza (1781). She retired from the stage in 1782.

In Paris, she began a relationship with Vestris. They had a son, Adolphe, in 1791, and were married in 1792. She died in Paris on 17 March 1808.
