= Thérèse Vestris =

French ballerina (1726–1808)

Thérèse Vestris (1726–1808) was a French (originally Italian) ballerina. She performed at the Paris Opera from 1751 and belonged to its elite dancers. She was the sister of Gaétan Vestris and Angiolo Vestris and was often paired with her brothers onstage.
