= Louise-Rosalie Lefebvre =

French actress and singer (1755–1821)

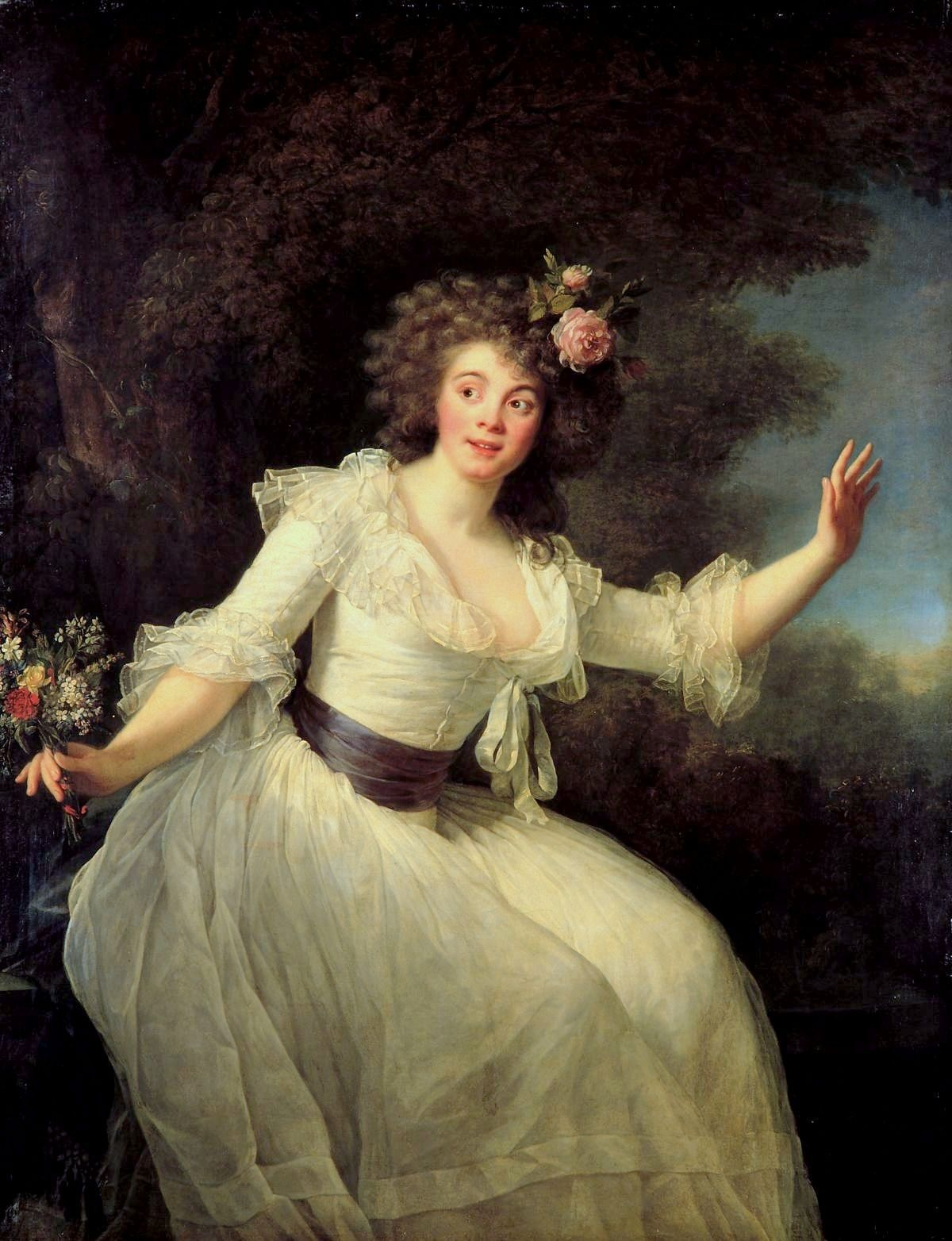
Portrait of Madame Dugazon

Louise-Rosalie Lefebvre (18 June 1755 – 22 September 1821), also known as Madame Dugazon, was a French operatic mezzo-soprano, actress and dancer.

== Biography ==
Born in Berlin as the daughter of a dancing master at the court of Frederick II of Prussia, she returned to Paris with her parents in 1765. She made her stage debut at the age of twelve as a dancer, but it was as an actress "with songs" that she made her debut at the Comédie Italienne in 1774 in Grétry's Sylvain. She was at once admitted pensionnaire and in 1775 sociétaire.

She became a star of the Comédie Italienne (which became the Opéra-Comique), where she created over 60 roles. She was married to the actor Jean-Henri Gourgaud, who went by the stage name Dugazon. Together they had a child, Gustave Dugazon. The couple soon divorced, but continued to perform at the Comédie Italienne for more than twenty years.

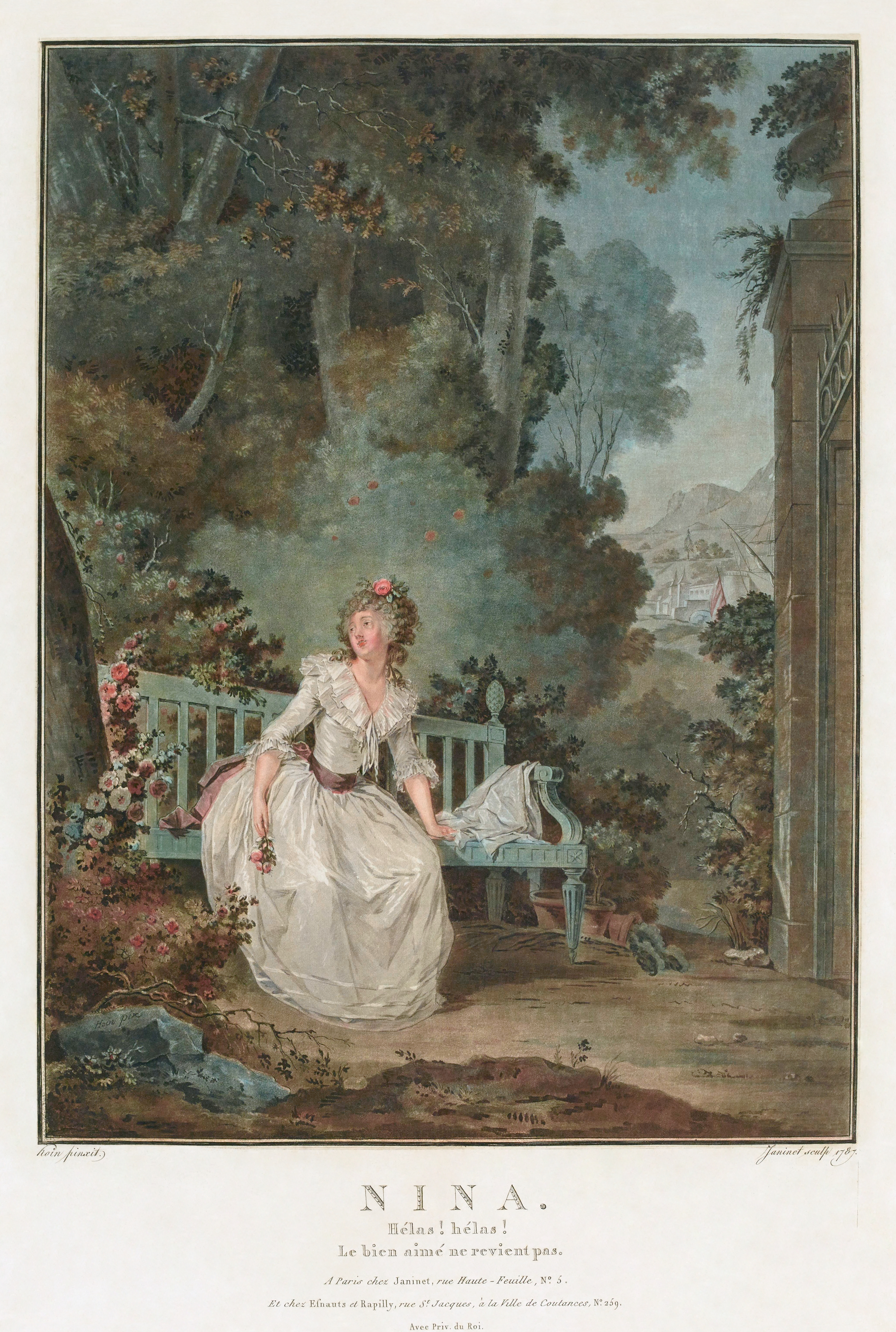
In Nicolas Dalayrac's Nina

The two kinds of parts with which she was especially identified—young mothers and women past their first youth—are still called "jeunes dugazons" and "mères dugazons" in French opera. Examples of the first are Jenny in La dame blanche and Berthe de Simiane in Les mousquetaires de la reine; of the second, Marguerite in Le Pré aux clercs. The type of voice for these roles is a light mezzo-soprano or a dark-colored soprano leggero, and they are generally less demanding technically.

== Roles created ==
- 1779: Nicolette in Aucassin et Nicolette (Grétry)
- 1784: Laurette in Richard Coeur-de-lion (Grétry)
- 1786: Nina in Nina, Ou la folle par Amour (Dalayrac)
