= Louis Dupré (dancer) =

French ballet dancer and choreographer

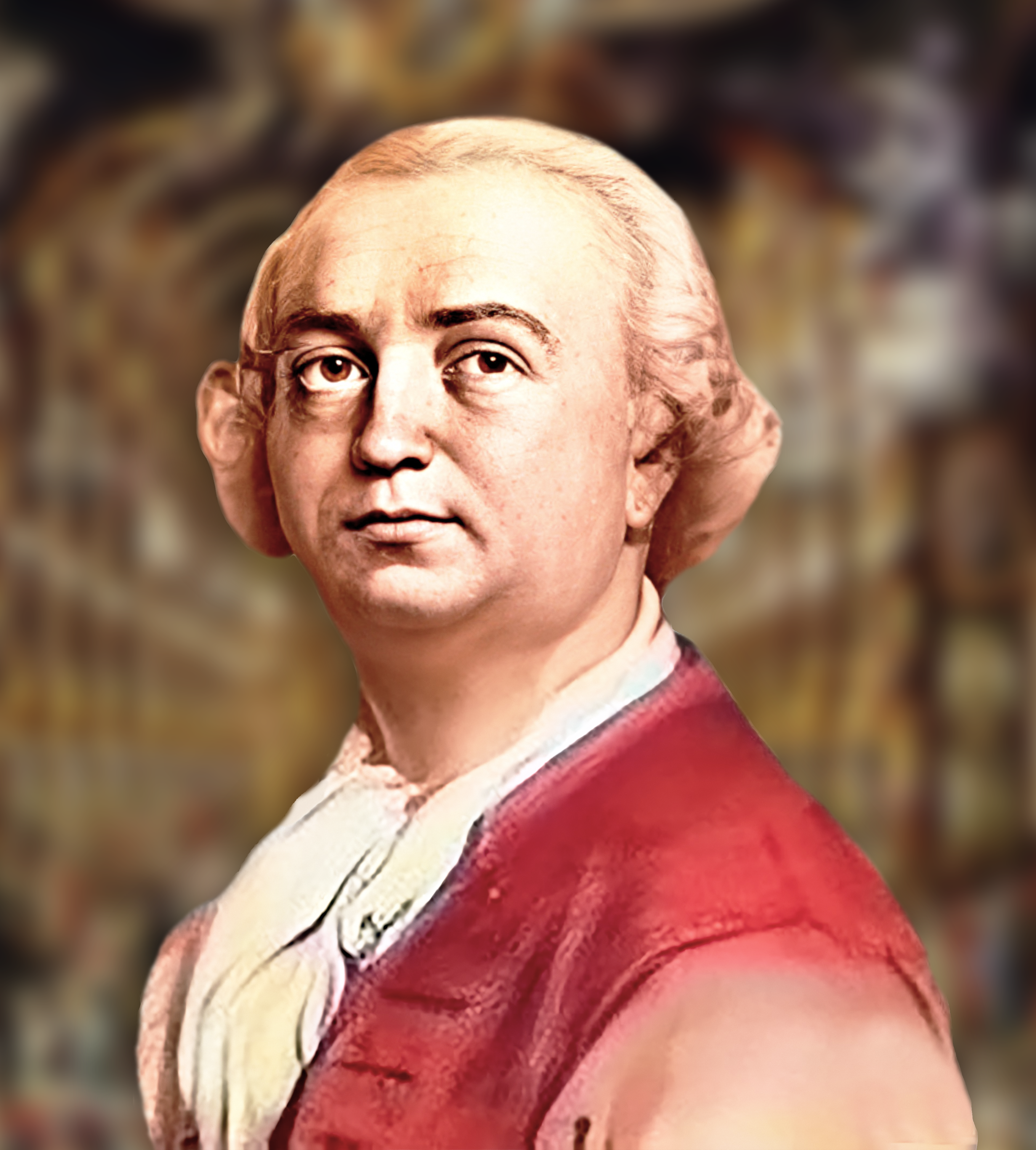
Portrait of Dupré

Louis Dupré (French pronunciation: [lwi dypʁe]; 1697–1774) was a French ballet dancer, ballet master and ballet teacher.

== Early life ==
Dupré likely began dancing in child roles under the name "Petit Dupré".

== Career ==
He made his official débuts at the Royal Academy of Music in 1714 and became its balletmaster in 1739. From 1725 to 1730, he regularly put on productions in London, Dresden and at the Polish court. Until 1743, he was one of the principal professors at the dance school of the National Opera of Paris, where his students included Marie-Anne de Camargo, Gaétan Vestris, Jean-Georges Noverre, Maximilien Gardel and Jean-Baptiste Hus.

Casanova was one of his devoted admirers. Technically accomplished, he was an emblematic figure of French belle danse, and in his time, he was called "le Grand Dupré" and "god of the dance".

=== Collège Louis le Grand ===
He composed several ballets for the students of the Collège Louis le Grand:

- 1748: Portrait du Grand Monarque
- 1749: Catilina
- 1750: Le Temple de la fortune
- 1751: Le Génie
- 1754: Les Spectacles du Parnasse
- 1755: La Prospérité
