= Angiolo Vestris =

Franco-Italian ballet dancer

- Born: Angiolo Maria Gasparo Vestri; 19 November 1730; Florence, Grand Duchy of Tuscany
- Died: 10 June 1809 (aged 78); Paris, France
- Occupation: Dancer
- Spouse: Rose Gourgaud (m. 1766)

Angiolo Maria Gasparo Vestris (19 November 1730, Florence – 10 June 1809, Paris) was a Franco-Italian ballet dancer.

The younger brother of Gaétan Vestris and Thérèse Vestris, he studied dance with Louis Dupré and became a soloist of the Opéra de Paris in 1753. He then danced at Stuttgart under the direction of Noverre (also marrying Rose Gourgaud, daughter of the comic-actor Dugazon, in the town in 1766) before returning to Paris in 1767, where he was taken on as an actor at the Comédie-Italienne.
