= Gaétan Vestris =

French ballet dancer (1729–1808)

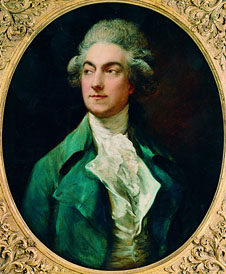
- Portrait of Vestris by Thomas Gainsborough
- Born: Gaetano Apolline Baldassarre Vestri; 18 April 1729; Florence, Grand Duchy of Tuscany
- Died: 23 September 1808 (aged 79); Paris, France
- Occupation: Dancer
- Spouse: Anna Heinel (m. 1792; died 1808)
- Children: Auguste Vestris, Adolphe Vestris
- Career
- Former groups: Paris Opera Ballet

Gaetano Apolline Baldassarre Vestris (18 April 1729 – 23 September 1808), French ballet dancer, was born in Florence and made his debut at the opera in 1749.

== Early life and family ==
Gaetano had several children who also became dancers. He was the lover of French ballerina Marie Allard; their son Auguste Vestris (1760–1842) was also considered the greatest male dancer of his time. Auguste made his debut at 12 with the Paris Opéra and was the company's leading dancer for 36 years. Auguste's son, Auguste Armand Vestris (1788–1825), husband of Lucia Elizabeth Vestris, took to the same profession and made his debut at the opera in 1800, but left Paris for England, Italy and Vienna never reappearing in France. Gaetano's brother, Angiolo Vestris (1730–1809), formerly a dancer and later an actor at the Comédie-Italienne, married Marie Rose Gourgaud, the sister of the actor Dugazon. Gaetano and Angiolo's sister, Thérèse (1726-1808), was also a dancer.

== Career ==
Born of an Italian theatrical family, he studied dance with Louis Dupré at the Royal Academy in Paris, later joining the Paris Opéra where he served as dancing master to Louis XVI. Vestris was the first dancer to discard the mask and to use his face in mime.

By 1751, his success and his vanity had grown to such a point that he is reported to have said, "There are but three great men in Europe—the king of Prussia, Voltaire and I." He was an excellent mimic as well as dancer. From 1770 to 1776 he was a master and composer of ballets, retiring, in favour of Jean Georges Noverre, with a pension.

Vestris married his former rival, dancer Anna Heinel (1753–1808), in 1792. She was of German origin and had wonderful success at the Paris Opera Ballet. They had a son, Adolphe, in 1791. He reappeared at the age of seventy-one on the occasion of his grandson's debut.
