= Rose Vestris =

French actress

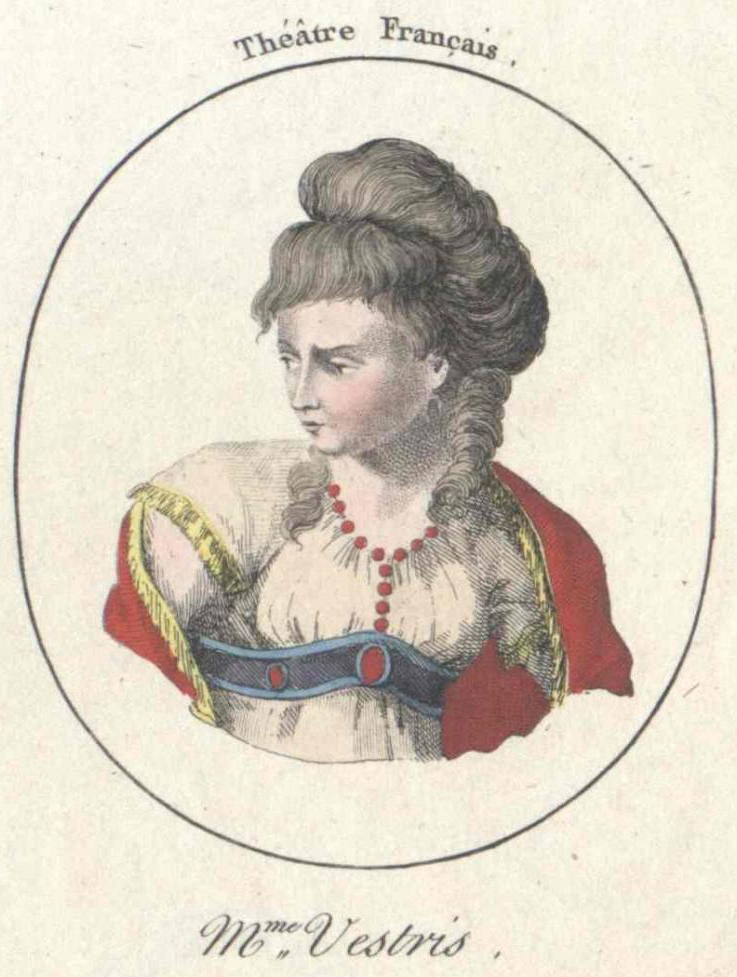
- Rose Vestris
- Born: Françoise-Rose Gourgaud; 7 April 1743; Marseille, France
- Died: 5 October 1804 (aged 61); Paris, France
- Occupation: Actress
- Spouse: Angiolo Vestris (m. 1766)

Françoise-Rose Gourgaud (7 April 1743, in Marseille – 5 October 1804, in Paris), stage name Madame Vestris, was a French actress.

She was the sister of Pierre-Antoine Gourgaud, stage name Dugazon. She married the ballet-dancer Angiolo Vestris (younger brother of Gaétan Vestris).

She was engaged at the Comédie-Française in 1768. She became a Sociétaires of the Comédie-Française in 1769.

She is most known for her roles in tragedy and higher comedy. She was described as highly talented, but also as ambitiously ruthless, as she was involved in a well-known rivalry with the Saint-Val sisters (Blanche Alziari de Roquefort and Pauline Alziari de Roquefort). Her career was protected by the Duc de Choiseul and the Duc de Duras. She achieved great success and was a privileged member of the theatre.

During the French Revolution, she joined the republican faction in the Théâtre de la République in 1791. After this, she was engaged at the Théâtre Feydeau until she was returned to the Comédie-Française when it was re-founded in 1799. She retired in 1803.
