= György Orbán =

Romanian-born Hungarian composer (born 1947)

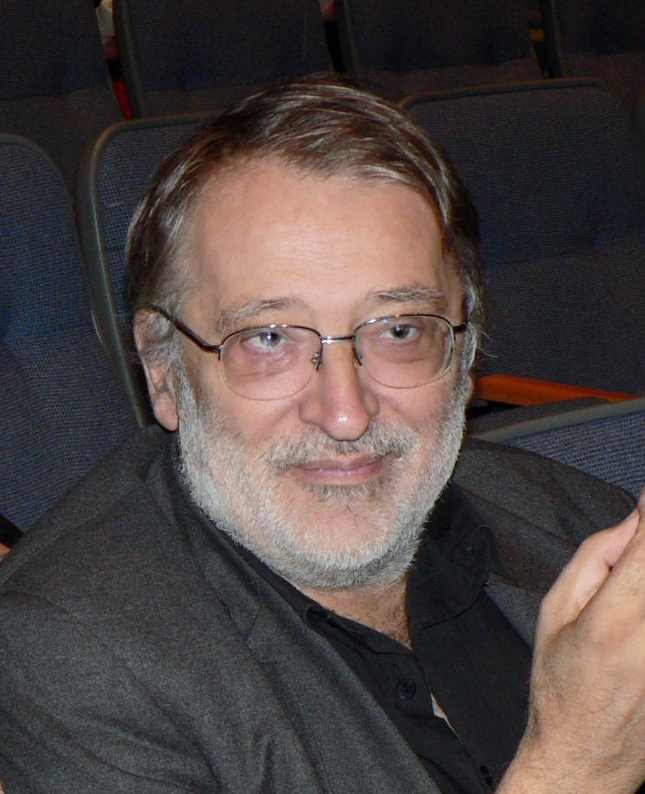
György Orbán

György Orbán (born 12 July 1947 in Târgu Mureș, Romania) is a Romanian-born Hungarian composer.

== Biography ==
György Orbán was born in Târgu Mureș, Romania on July 12, 1947. He studied music composition with Sigismund Toduță and Max Eisikovits and music theory with János Jagamas at the Cluj-Napoca Academy of Music where he was a student from 1968 through 1973. After completing his studies, he joined the faculty of that school where he taught both music theory and counterpoint for six years.

In 1979 Orbán emigrated from Romania to Hungary when he accepted a position as a music editor with the music publisher Editio Musica Budapest. He remained in that position through 1990. In 1982 he became a professor of music theory and composition at the Franz Liszt Academy of Music. In 1989 his avant-garde music composition Triple Sextet (1979) received honors at the Tribune Internationale des Compositeurs in Paris. While his earlier music embraced the avant-garde style, he moved away from this beginning in the mid-1980s into a neo-Romantic aesthetic. In 1991 he was awarded the Bartók-Pásztory Prize.

Orbán has written numerous sacred works intended for religious use. His choral music mixes traditional liturgical renaissance and baroque counterpoint with intrusions from jazz.

== Works, editions, recordings ==
=== Recordings ===
Monographs

- Orban: Hungarian Passion. Bartók Béla Chorus and University Orchestra dir. Gábor Baross HCD31824 Hungaroton
- Cantico di frate sole. Mass no 11: Benedictus. Razumovsky Trilogy. Zsuzsa Alföldi (Soprano) Reményi Ede Chamber Orchestra Hungaroton

Collections

- György Orbán: Magnificat; Péter Tóth: Hymnus de Magna Hungariae Regina; Kodály: My Heart Aches and Kálló Double Dance. Gábor Baross and Béla Bartók Choir of the Eötvös Lóránd University (2009)
- Ex Oriente Lux: Choir Masterpieces from Northern and Eastern Europe: Knut Nystedt, György Orbán, József Karai, Lajos Bárdos, Sergei Rachmaninov, Urmas Sisask, Arvo Pärt, Petr Eben, Mircea Diaconescu, Krzysztof Penderecki, Tchaikovsky, Alexander Gretchaninov, Doru Popovici. Carmina Mundi dir. Harald Nickoll Audite 97.475
- Wind Quintets - Endre Szervánszky, György Ligeti, György Kurtág, György Orbán. Berlin Philharmonic Wind Quintet (1994) BIS-CD-662
- Musica Sacra Hungarica - László Halmos, Ferenc Farkas, Zoltán Kodály, György Orbán, Lajos Bárdos, Gábor Lisznyai, Arthur Harmat, Ferenc Kersch, György Deák-Bárdos. Budapest Madrigal Choir Eva Kollar Carus 2.151-99
- Choral songs on Shakespeare texts - Orpheus with his lute. O mistress mine. With works by Robert Applebaum, Matthew Harris (composer), Juhani Komulainen, Nils Lindberg, Jaakko Mäntyjärvi, Kevin Olson (composer), Håkan Parkman, John Rutter, Martha Sullivan, Chicago a cappella dir. Trevor Mitchell, Cedille
- Orban, György Selmeczy: Contemporary Hungarian Masses Hungaroton
- Songs - Orbán Spanish songs. Songs to words by Sándor Weöres. János Vajda, Songs to words by Géza Szöcs: Andrea Meláth (mezzo-soprano), Emese Virág (piano). HCD31827 Hungaroton
- Musica Nostra - Choral Music Alberto Balzanelli (Argentina), Miklós Kocsár, Péter Nógrádi, Miklós Sugár, Erzsébet Szőnyi György Orbán, József Karai, Ferenc Farkas, Petr Eben, Augustin Kubizek. HCD31840 Hungaroton
- János Vajda: Missa in A, Orban: Missa prima HCD31929 Hungaroton
- Miklós Kocsár, Miklós Mohay, Erzsébet Szőnyi, Levente Gyöngyösi, Zoltán Gárdonyi HCD32190 Hungaroton
