= Krisztián Cser =

Hungarian opera singer and physicist (born 1977)

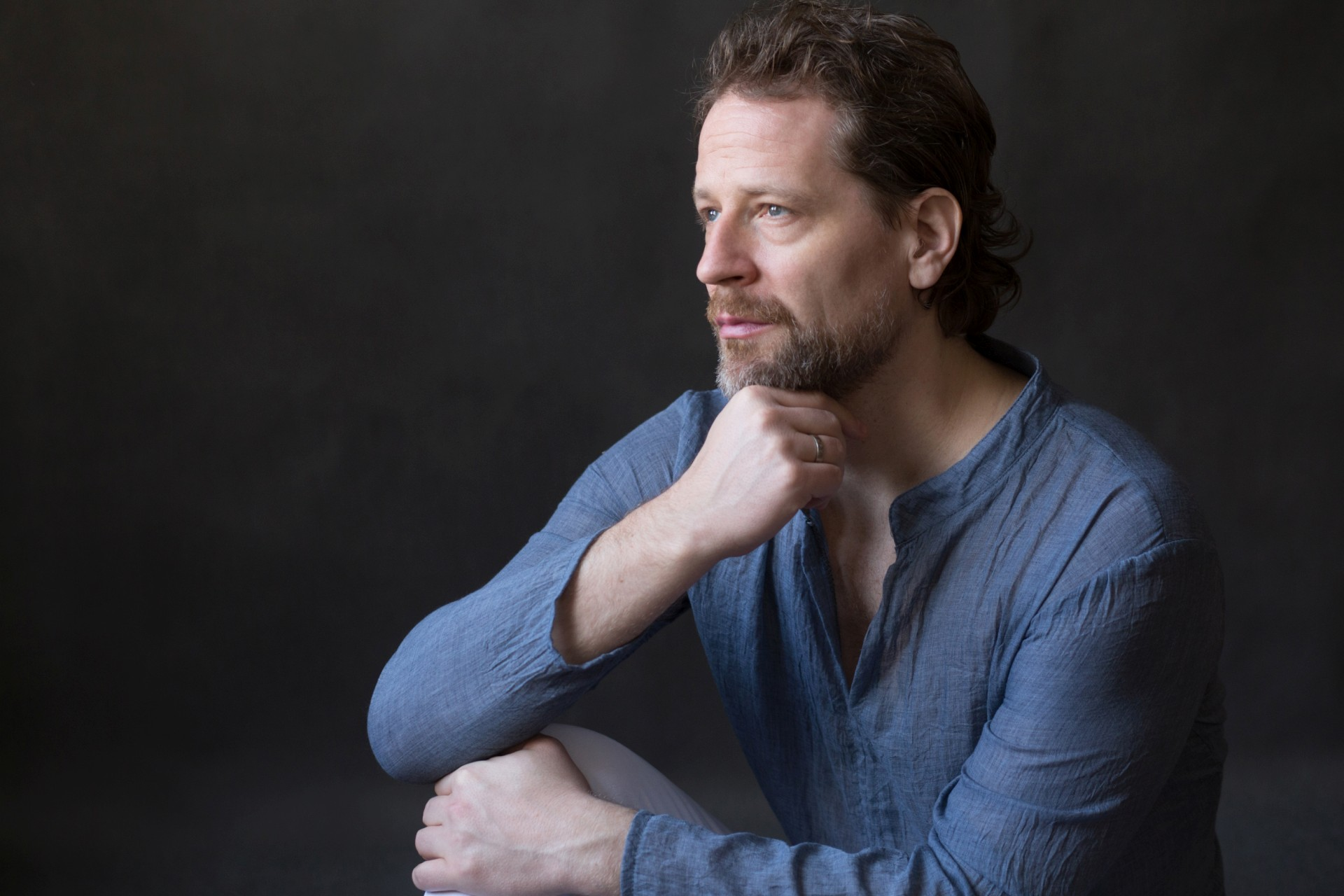
- Cser in 2020
- Pronunciation: [kristiaːn t͡ʃɛr]
- Born: December 9, 1977 (age 48); Szeged, Hungary
- Citizenship: Hungarian
- Education: Liszt Academy; University of Szeged
- Occupations: Opera singer; musician; physicist
- Years active: 1998-present
- Employer(s): Hungarian State Opera; Theater Chemnitz Opernhaus
- Children: 2
- Parents: Cser Miklós (conductor) (father); Andrea Balló (painter) (mother)
- Relatives: László Cser (elder brother); Cser Ádám (conductor, younger brother); Kinga Cser (younger sister); Júlia Keszericze-Cser (younger sister); Lóránt Gyozsán (younger brother)
- Awards: "Youth of March"; Mihály Székely Commemorative Medallion; Hungarian Silver Cross of Merit; Gusztáv Oláh Commemorative Medallion; Hungarian Gold Cross of Merit
- Website: www.krisztiancser.com

Krisztián Cser (pronounced [kristiaːn t͡ʃɛr]) (born 9 December 1977) is a Hungarian operatic and concert singer (bass) and physicist, the soloist of the Hungarian State Opera.

== Biography ==
Krisztián Cser was born in 1977, in Szeged, Hungary. He grew up in a family of musicians. His grandmother Tímea Cser was a soprano, grandfather Gusztáv Cser was a composer-conductor, father Miklós Cser was a conductor. His mother Andrea Balló is a painter. He has 5 siblings. One of his brothers, Ádám Cser is a musician too, he is a composer-conductor. He grew up in Szeged, Hungary, where he began his musical studies by playing the piano in his early childhood. After leaving high school, he graduated in physics at the University of Szeged in 2002 (Hungary) and began to work as a PhD student at the Institute of Biophysics of the Szeged Biological Research Centre. But his artistic roots proved strong, science was replaced by music in his life. He studied classical singing at the University of Szeged, where his vocal trainer was István Andrejcsik, then he attended the Department of Vocal and Opera Studies at the Liszt Academy, where the famous operatic singer Éva Marton was his professor and studied stage movement and acting with Balázs Kovalik.

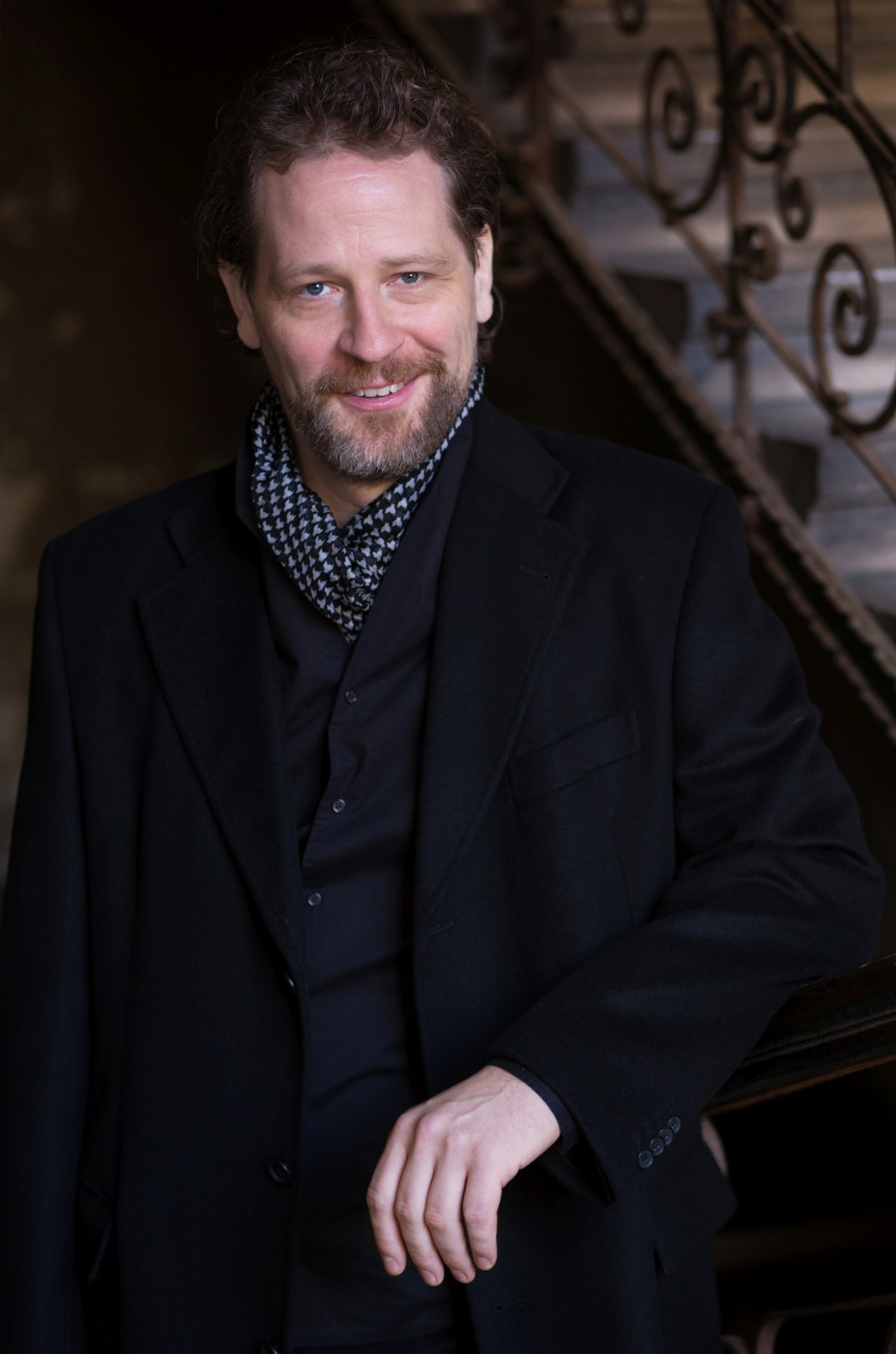
Cser in February of 2020

Krisztián Cser succeeded in several Hungarian and international singing competitions, either he got into the finals, got a special prize, or even won.

He came out as an oratorio soloist in J. S. Bach's Saint John Passion in 1998. His repertoire includes a wide range of musical styles from early baroque to contemporary music. In opera roles he appeared first in 2008, since when he has been a member of the Hungarian State Opera. His first lead role at the Hungarian State Opera was Pomádé in Ránki's King Pomádé's New Clothes. He has sung under the baton of renowned Hungarian and foreign conductors such as Pierre Cao, Péter Eötvös, Helmuth Rilling, Peter Schreier, Muhai Tang, Gábor Hollerung, Kirill Karabits, Zoltán Kocsis, Ádám Fischer, Iván Fischer, Zoltán Peskó, György Vashegyi, Ken'ichiro Kobayashi, Zsolt Hamar and Tamás Vásáry. During the years, his title-role singing in Béla Bartók's Bluebeard's Castle became emblematic, he sings it in many Hungarian and international performances successfully with the contribution of renowned conductors. In some of the countries during his tour around the world, the audience could listen to and watch this opera for the first time in his performance. Above all, on the CD published in 2018 for the centenary of the Bluebeard's Castle premiere, Krisztián Cser sings Bluebeard.

Besides Bartók's opera, he has played other remarkable roles on opera stages. He frequently sings the bass roles of Mozart's operas as Figaro, Leporello and Sarastro, and authentically plays the protagonists in Verdi and Wagner's operas, such as The Grand Inquisitor and Philip II in Don Carlos or Wotan in The Rhinegold. His other leading roles have included Colline in Puccini's La bohème and Don Basilio in Rossini's The Barber of Seville. His ever-expanding repertoire includes more than 60 operas and nearly 80 roles.

He regularly performs on Hungarian opera and concert stages. He gave recitals also at the Royal Festival Hall in London, at the Elbphilharmonie in Hamburg and many more famous concert hall. He has debut as Wotan in Wagner's The Rhinegold in 2018, and as Don Pizarro in Beethoven's Fidelio at the Opernhaus Chemnitz. In 2019 he sang the role of Bluebeard with the Budapest Festival Orchestra conducted by Iván Fischer, at Carnegie Hall in New York City. He also sang the role of Wotan in the fall of 2019 in Mexico City, where the 150th anniversary of the staging of Wagner's The Rhinegold was celebrated.

== Career ==
- 1998: first professional appearance as an oratorio soloist | J. S. Bach: St John Passion
- 2002: graduate as physicist at the University of Szeged
- 2006: graduate at the College of Music in Szeged
- 2008: graduate at the Liszt Academy of Music in Budapest
- 2008: debut as Don Magnifico | Rossini: La Cenerentola | Italy (Spoleto)
- 2008: the first lead at the Hungarian State Opera: Pomádé | Ránki: King Pomádé's New Clothes
- 2010-: guest artist of the Hungarian State Opera
- 2014: Bluebeard | Béla Bartók: Bluebeard's Castle | China, Ukraine (Kyiv)
- 2014: debut as Figaro | Mozart : The Marriage of Figaro, Hungary (Budapest)
- 2014: Kossuth | Iván Fischer: The Red Heifer,
- 2014: tour in Germany with the Budapest Festival Orchestra
- 2015: Bluebeard | Béla Bartók: Bluebeard's Castle, Italy (Milan)
- 2016: Sarastro | Mozart: The Magic Flute | Royal Festival Hall, United Kingdom (London) | Konzerthaus Berlin, Germany, Concertgebouw - Netherlands (Amsterdam) | Concertgebouw, Bruges, Belgium
- 2017: Bluebeard | Béla Bartók: Bluebeard's Castle | Royal Festival Hall, United Kingdom (London) | Concert Hall, Poland (Katowice) | Concertgebouw, Bruges, Belgium
- 2018: debut as Wotan | Wagner: The Rhinegold | Germany (Chemnitz)
- 2019: debut as Alvise Badoero / Ponchielli: La Gioconda, Hungary (Budapest)
- 2019: tour with the Budapest Festival Orchestra | Bluebeard | Béla Bartók: Bluebeard's Castle | Elbphilharmonie, Germany (Hamburg) | Philharmonie de Paris, Paris-Grande salle Pierre Boulez, France (Paris) | Philharmonie Luxembourg, Luxemburg (Luxembourg) | Carnegie Hall, United States of America (New York City)
- 2019: debut as Don Pizarro | Beethoven: Fidelio, Germany (Chemnitz)
- 2019: Wotan | Wagner: The Rhinegold | Sala Nezahualcoyotl, Mexico, (Mexico City)
- 2020: debut as Philip II | Verdi: Don Carlos | National Theatre of Miskolc, Hungary (Miskolc)

== Awards and scholarship ==
- Róbert Kovács Philharmony Scholarship 2003
- Albert Szent-Györgyi Scholarship 2005
- Annie Fischer Scholarship 2007
- Hungarian State Opera Scholarship 2008-2010
- "Youth of March" 2010
- Wagner Society Scholarship 2011
- Mihály Székely Commemorative Medallion 2013
- Hungarian Silver Cross of Merit 2014
- Gusztáv Oláh Commemorative Medallion 2016
- Hungarian Gold Cross of Merit 2020
- György Melis Award 2021

== Music competitions ==
- 4th Simándy József National Singing Competition | 2nd category - Winner (2004)
- Montserrat Caballe Singing Competition | Finals (2008)
- Geneva International Music Competition - Special Prize (2009)

== Discography ==
=== Opera ===
Composer	Opera	Role	Conductor, Chorus and orchestra	Recording year	Release year	Label	OCLC
Béla Bartók	Bluebeard's Castle	Bluebeard	Gábor Hollerung Dohnányi Orchestra Budafok	2017	2018	Hunnia Records HRCD 1733	
György Ránki	King Pomádé's New Clothes	Pomádé	Péter Oberfrank Opera Chorus Budapest Danubia Orchestra Óbuda	2017	2017		
György Selmeczi	Spiritisti	Il Duca	János Kovács Opera Chorus Budapest Győr Philharmonic Orchestra	2017	2017		
Ferenc Erkel	György Dózsa	Friar Laurence	Balázs Kocsár Hungarian National Choir Hungarian State Opera Orchestra		2017		
Mozart - Lackfi	Útravaló 2015 Parázsfuvolácska	Sarastro		2015	2015	MÁO 014	
Ferenc Erkel	László Hunyadi Original version 1844-1862	Ulrik Cillei	Domonkos Héja Honvéd Male Choir Budapest Studio Choir Budapest Philharmonic Orchestra	2012	2017	MÁO 002	
Ferenc Erkel	László Hunyadi	Ulrik Cillei	Domonkos Héja Honvéd Male Choir Budapest Studio Choir Budapest Philharmonic Orchestra	2012	2014	Brilliant Classics BRIL 94869	894367998

=== Oratorio, song ===
Composer	Work	Conductor, Chorus and orchestra	Recording year	Release year	Label	OCLC
Miklós Kocsár György Orbán	Laudatio Episcopi Sancti Martini Magnificat	László Kovács Eötvös Loránd University Béla Bartók Choir and University Chamber Orchestra		2016		
Lajos Huszár	Passio et mors Domini nostri Jesu Christi	Mátyás Antal Hungarian National Choir		2009	Hungaroton Classic HCD 32629	
Christian Geist	Kirchenkonzerte	György Vashegyi Chamber Ensemble of the Orfeo Orchestra		2008	Hungaroton Classic HCD 32587	268800626
Georg Lickl	Sacred music Missa Solemnis in C major Offertorium Bone Deus, amor meus Missa Solemnis in D minor	György Vashegyi Purcell Choir Erdődy Chamber Orchestra	2007	2008	Hungaroton Classic HCD 32480	244424120

== Filmography ==
=== Opera film ===
Composer	Opera	Role	Director	Conductor Chorus and orchestra	Recording year	Release year	NAVA ID
Mozart	The Magic Flute	Sarastro	Miklós Szinetár	Gábor Káli Opera Chorus Budapest Hungarian State Opera Orchestra	2020	2020	3645995
Ponchielli	Gioconda	Alvise Badoero	András Almási-Tóth	Gergely Kesselyák Opera Chorus Budapest Hungarian State Opera Orchestra	2020	2020	3632972
Puccini	La bohème	Colline	Kálmán Nádasdy	Gergely Kesselyák Opera Chorus Budapest Hungarian State Opera Children's Chorus Hungarian State Opera Orchestra	2019	2019	3586896
Verdi	A Masked Ball	Horn	Fabio Ceresa	Michelangelo Mazza Opera Chorus Budapest Hungarian State Opera Orchestra	2018	2018	3363870
Rossini	The Barber of Seville	Don Basilio	Csaba Káel	Gábor Hollerung Studio Chorus Budapest Dohnányi Orchestra Budafok	2017	2019	3471745
Mozart - Lackfi	Parázsfuvolácska	Sarastro	Attila Toronykőy	Géza Köteles Opera Chorus Budapest Hungarian State Opera Orchestra	2014	2014	1883572
Monteverdi	L'incoronazione di Poppea	Lictor	Domonkos Moldován	Pál Németh Savaria Baroque Orchestra	2009	2010	1060676 1063492

=== Concert film ===
Composer	Title	Director	Conductor Chorus and orchestra	Recording year	Release year	NAVA ID
J. S. Bach - Mendelssohn	St Matthew Passion	Viktor Homonnay	György Vashegyi Purcell Choir Orfeo Orchestra	2015	2015	2368000
Liszt	The legend of Saint Elizabeth	Eszter Petrovics	Balázs Kocsár Kodály Choir Debrecen Cantemus Mixed Choir Nyíregyháza Cantemus Children's Choir Nyíregyháza Kodály Philharmonic Debrecen	2015	2015	2372526
Mendelssohn	Paulus		György Vashegyi Purcell Choir Orfeo Orchestra		2014	1841604
Ravel	Fairy Tales of Ravel		Gilbert Varga Mátyás Antal Zoltán Kocsis Hungarian National Choir Hungarian Philharmonic Orchestra Hungarian Radio Orchestra	2013	2013	1731770
Verdi	Attila	Csaba Káel	Pier Giorgio Morandi Cluj-Napoca Hungarian Opera Choir Cluj-Napoca Hungarian Opera Orchestra	2013	2013	1559724
Purcell	The Fairy-Queen	Csaba Káel	György Vashegyi Purcell Choir Orfeo Orchestra	2013	2013	1632254
Händel	Hercules	Csaba Káel	György Vashegyi Purcell Choir Orfeo Orchestra	2013	2013	1516084
Händel J. S. Bach Vivaldi	Baroque Evening (J. S. Bach: Singet dem Herrn ein neues Lied)		Gábor Hollerung György Vashegyi Budapest Academic Choral Society Purcell Choir Dohnányi Orchestra Budafok Orfeo Orchestra Budapest Strings	2012	2012	1429786
J. S. Bach	St Matthew Passion	Viktor Homonnay	György Vashegyi Purcell Choir Kodály Choir Debrecen Orfeo Orchestra Capella Savaria	2012	2012	1355520

== Opera roles ==
- Bartók: Bluebeard's Castle
  - Bluebeard
- Beethoven: Fidelio
  - Rocco
  - Don Fernando
  - Pizzaro
- Bizet: Carmen
  - Zuniga
- Britten: The Rape of Lucretia
  - Collatinus
- Donizetti: L'elisir d'amore
  - Dulcamara
- Donizetti: Anna Bolena
  - Enrico (Henry VIII)
  - Lord Rochefort
- Donizetti: Lucia di Lammermoor
  - Raimondo Bidebent
- Eötvös: Love and Other Demons
  - Don Toribio
- Erkel: Hunyadi László
  - Ulrik Cillei
- Erkel: Dózsa György
  - Bagos
  - Friar Laurence
- Fischer: The red heifer
  - Kossuth
- Gounod: Roméo et Juliette
  - Frère Laurent
- Gyöngyösi: The Master and Margarita
  - Woland
- Gyöngyösi: Tragœdia Temporis I.
  - The Lord
- Händel: Deidamia
  - Licomede
- Händel: Semele
  - Cadmus
- Haydn: L'anima del filosofo ossia Orfeo ed Euridice
  - Plutone
- Hubay: The Violin Maker of Cremona
  - Ferrari, a master violin maker
- Lendvay: The Respectful Prostitute
  - The negro
- Monteverdi: L'Orfeo
  - Caronte
  - Plutone
- Monteverdi: The Coronation of Poppaea
  - Ottone
- Mozart: The Magic Flute
  - Sarastro
  - Second priest
- Mozart: Don Giovanni
  - Leporello
  - Il Commendatore
- Mozart: The Marriage of Figaro
  - Figaro
  - Bartolo
  - Antonio
  - Count Almaviva
- Mozart: Idomeneo
  - The voice of the Oracle of Neptune
- Mozart: La clemenza di Tito
  - Publio
- Ponchielli: La Gioconda
  - Alvise Badoero
- Puccini: La bohème
  - Colline
- Puccini: Gianni Schicchi
  - Marco
  - Ser Amantio di Nicolao
- Puccini: Tosca
  - Cesare Angelotti
- Purcell: The Fairy-Queen
  - Drunken Poet
- Rameau: Hippolyte et Aricie
  - Pluton
  - Neptune
- Ravel: L'enfant et les sortilèges
  - Le fauteuil
  - L'arbre
- Ránki: King Pomádé's New Clothes
  - Pomádé
- Rossini: The Barber of Seville
  - Don Basilio
- Rossini: La Cenerentola
  - Don Magnifico
- Sári: Sonnenfinsternis
  - Miklós Radnóti
- Selmeczi: The Spiritists
  - Il Duca
- Schönberg: Moses and Aron
  - Priest
- Smetana: The Bartered Bride
  - Kecal
- Strauss: The Silent Woman
  - Farfallo
- Strauss: Ariadne on Naxos
  - Truffaldino
- Strauss: Daphne
  - Peneios
- Strauss: Elektra
  - Orest's tutor
- Strauss: Piece Day
  - The Holsteiner
- Strauss: Salome
  - First soldier
  - First Nazarene
- Stravinsky: Oedipus rex
  - Tiresias
- Tihanyi: The white rose
  - The man
- Vajda: Mario and the Magician
  - Cipolla
- Verdi: Aida
  - The King of Egypt
- Verdi: Attila
  - Leone
- Verdi: Don Carlos
  - Philip II
  - Charles V
  - The Grand Inquisitor
- Verdi: The Sicilian Vespers
  - Count Vaudemont
- Verdi: Otello
  - Lodovico
- Verdi: Rigoletto
  - Sparafucile
- Verdi: Simon Boccanegra
  - Jacopo Fiesco
- Verdi: Stiffelio
  - Jorg
- Verdi: The Troubadour
  - Ferrando
- Verdi: A Masked Ball
  - Samuel
- Wagner: The Rhinegold
  - Wotan
  - Fasolt
- Wagner: Rienzi
  - Raimondo
- Wagner: Siegfried
  - The Wanderer
- Wagner: The Valkyrie
  - Hunding
- Wagner: Tannhäuser
  - Reinmar von Zweter
  - Hermann
- Weber: The Freeshooter
  - Kaspar
- Weill: Rise and Fall of the City of Mahagonny
  - Joe, called Alaskawolfjoe
