= Miklós Mohay =

Hungarian composer

Miklós Mohay (born 28 December 1960 in Budapest) is a Hungarian composer and professor. He currently serves as head of the music theory department at the Liszt Academy in Budapest, Hungary. He won the Ferenc Erkel Prize in 2007.

== Works, editions and recordings ==
- Hosszú út porábából
- Choral works - Miklós Kocsár, Miklós Mohay, Erzsébet Szőnyi, Levente Gyöngyösi, Zoltán Gárdonyi. HCD32190 Hungaroton
