= Harmat =

Harmat or Harmath is a Hungarian surname. Notable people with the surname include:

- Artúr Harmat (1885–1962), Hungarian composer
- Zoltan Harmat (1900–1985), Hungarian-Israeli architect
