= Via crucis (Liszt) =

Choral composition by Franz Liszt

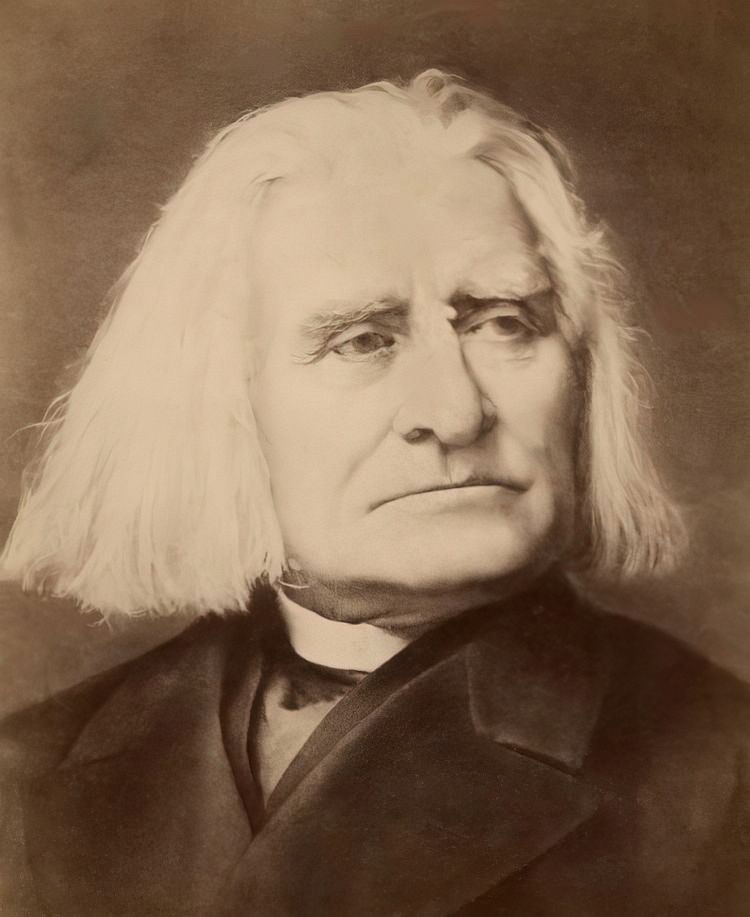
Franz Liszt

Via Crucis, (Die 14 Stationen des Kreuzwegs) S.53, is a work for mixed choir, soloists and organ (also harmonium or piano) by Franz Liszt. The work is devoted to the Stations of the Cross. It is one of the last works of Liszt.

Liszt started the composition of this work in the fall of 1878 when he stayed in Rome and ended it in February 1879 in Budapest. There are three sources of the work available: the first sketches in Weimar, the manuscript of the whole work in Budapest and a copy of it in Weimar. The original version was set with accompaniment by organ. Liszt made later a version with piano.

The work is a special case in the oeuvre of Liszt, especially because it is a work of great serenity. The work is also special because it reaches the limits of tonality, breaking the status quo of predominant tonal music of the time. The work combines unison songs (Stations I and XIV) with Lutheran chorales (Stations IV and XII), and chorales inspired by Bach's chorales (Station VI), whereas other stations consist of solo organ (or piano).

Liszt himself wanted to perform the work in the Colosseum with accompaniment by a giant harmonium. However, he never saw the piece performed because the first performance only took place 43 years after the composer's death: it premiered in Budapest on Good Friday 29 March 1929, conducted by the composer Artúr Harmat, Professor of Church Music at the Liszt Academy.

== Setting ==
The work follows the fourteen stations:

	Opening	Vexilla Regis, text by Venantius Fortunatus
I.	Pilate condemns Jesus to die.	Innocens ergo sum, Matthew 27:24
II.	Jesus accepts his cross.	A baritone soloist sings Ave Crux, from the introductive text
III.	Jesus falls for the first time.	The male choir sings Jesus cadit, the female choir continues with Stabat Mater
IV.	Jesus meets his mother, Mary.	Solo organ
V.	Simon helps carry the cross.	Solo organ
VI.	Veronica wipes the face of Jesus.	Choral O Haupt voll Blut und Wunden, text by Paul Gerhardt, melody by Hans Leo Hassler
VII.	Jesus falls for the second time.	As station III
VIII.	Jesus meets the three women of Jerusalem.	A baritone soloist sings Nolite flere super me, Luke 23:28
IX.	Jesus falls for the third time.	As station III
X.	Jesus is stripped of his clothes.	Solo organ
XI.	Jesus is nailed to the cross.	The male choir sings Crucifige (Crucify Him)
XII.	Jesus dies on the cross.	A baritone soloist sings Eli, Eli, In manus tuas, Consummatum est (words of crucifixion) and the choir sing the chorale O Traurigkeit, text by Johann Rist
XIII.	Jesus is taken down from the cross.	Solo organ
XIV.	Jesus is placed in the tomb.	Partial many-voiced variation on the introductive Vexilla Regis
