= Balázs Kocsár =

Hungarian orchestral and operatic conductor

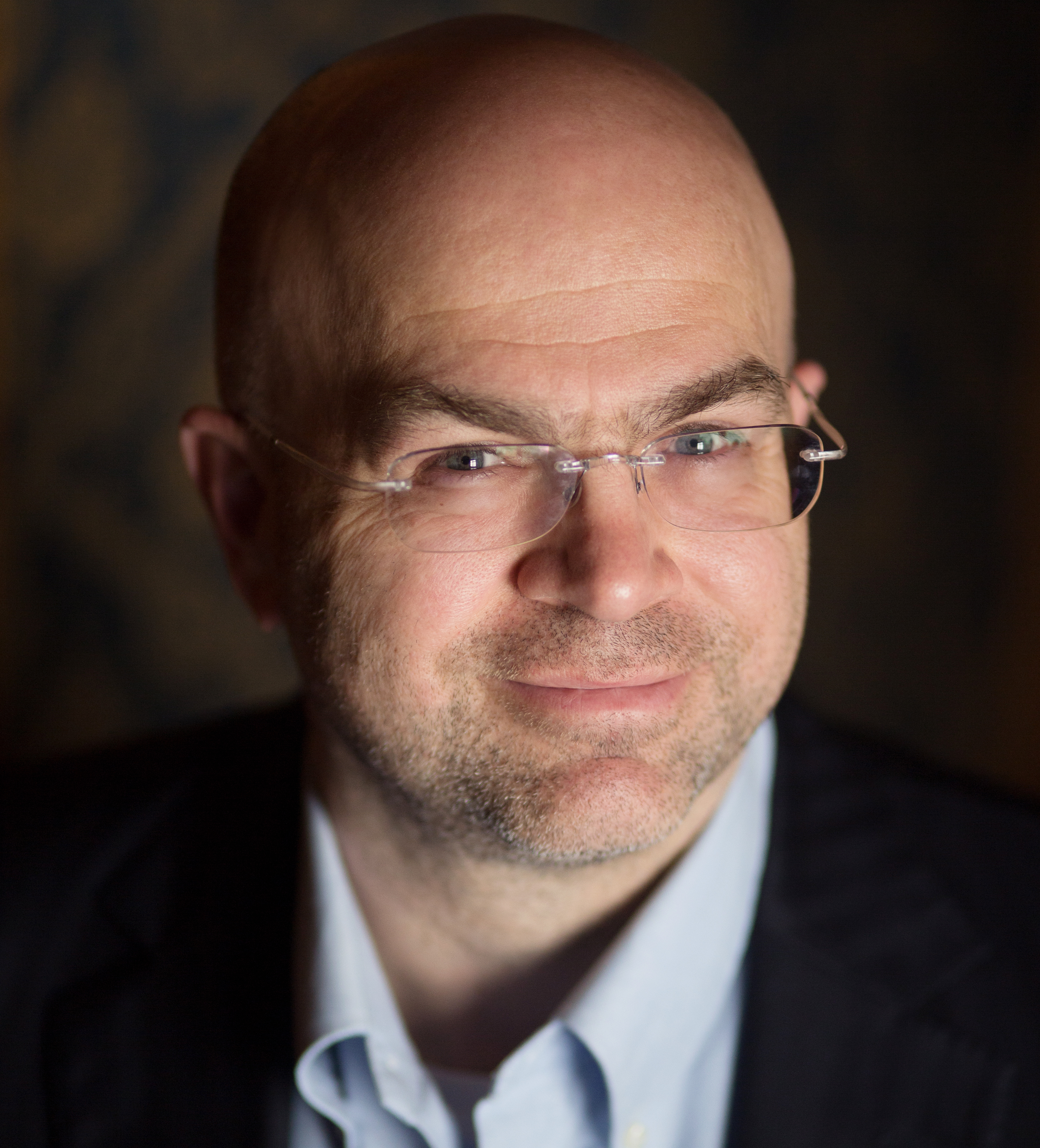
Balázs Kocsár

Balázs Kocsár is a Hungarian orchestral and operatic conductor. He was born in 1963 in Budapest. His father Miklós Kocsár is a composer awarded the Kossuth Prize. He studied composition at Béla Bartók Vocational School of Music (Bartók Béla Zeneművészeti Szakközépiskola). Then he entered the prestigious Franz Liszt Academy of Music to study choir conducting under István Párkai which was followed by studies in orchestral conducting under the guidance of Ervin Lukács. He graduated with distinction in 1991. His studies were continued at Universität für Musik und darstellende Kunst Wien under Professor Karl Österreicher. He also participated in master classes led by Helmuth Rilling, Jorma Panula, Moshe Atzmon and Péter Eötvös.

== Biography ==
Balázs Kocsár has conducted at a number of operas at concert halls over the world including Italy, Germany, France, Australia. Among others he performed with musicians like Diana Damrau, Elena Garanca, Roberto Alagna and Jonas Kaufman. There are over 70 operas on his repertoire, staged in more than a thousand performances home or abroad, and gained 14 years of experience in musical management. Since 2010 he has been associate professor at the University of Pécs at the Faculty of Music and Visual Arts.

== Major events in career ==
- 1990-1993 Operatic conductor at the National Theatre in Szeged.
- 1991-1994 Assistant conductor to Ervin Lukács at the Hungarian National Philharmonic.
- 1992- He has been permanent conductor of the Hungarian State Opera.
- 1993-1999 Musical director of Csokonai Theatre in Debrecen.
- 1999-2002 Principal conductor at Oper Frankfurt.
- 2004-2012 Vocational Head at Kodály Philharmonic and Kodály Choir Debrecen and the Operatic Section of Csokonai Theatre Debrecen.
- 2010- Ever since 2010 he has been associate professor at University of Pécs Faculty of Music and Visual Arts.
- 2011-2013 Musical director for the Budapest Spring Festival.

== Prizes ==
- 1989 He won the third prize as the best Hungarian participant at the 6th International Competition for Conductors organised by the Hungarian State Television.
- 1995 He was awarded first prize at the Franco Ferrara Competition for Condocturs organised by the Teatro Dell’Opera di Roma.
- 1999 Awarded the Liszt Prize.
