= Diaconescu =

Diaconescu is a Romanian surname. Notable people with the surname include:

- Camelia Diaconescu (b. 1963), rower
- Cristian Diaconescu (b. 1959), diplomat and politician
- Dan Diaconescu (b. 1967), politician, media tycoon, television presenter
- Grigoraș Diaconescu (b.1982), football player
- Ioana Diaconescu (b. 1979), swimmer
- Ion Diaconescu (1917–2011), dissident and politician
- Mircea Diaconescu (b. 1929), composer
- Rebecca Diaconescu (b. 2006), swimmer
