= Mario and the Magician =

Novella by Thomas Mann

- First UK edition (Cover art by Hans, publ. Martin Secker, 1930)
- Author: Thomas Mann
- Original title: Mario und der Zauberer
- Language: German
- Publication date: 1929
- Publication place: Germany
- English publication date: 1930
- Text: Mario and the Magician at Internet Archive

Mario and the Magician (German: Mario und der Zauberer) is a novella written by German author Thomas Mann in 1929. It was published by Martin Secker in 1930 in an English translation by Helen Tracy Lowe-Porter, and her translation was included in Thomas Mann's Stories of Three Decades, published by Alfred A. Knopf in 1936.

== Plot summary ==
The German narrator describes a trip by his family to the fictional seaside town of Torre di Venere, Italy (a fictional town based on the touristic city of Forte dei Marmi) in the 1920s. The stay becomes unpleasant, partly because he finds the Italian people had become too nationalistic.

The family attends a performance by a magician and hypnotist who goes by the name "Cavaliere Cipolla", who uses his mental powers in an abusive or fascist way to control his audience. The magician, whose body is somehow disfigured but who has a strong mind, represents the mesmerizing power of authoritarian leaders in Europe at the time — he is autocratic, misuses power, and is able to subjugate the crowd, counterbalancing his inferiority complex by artificially boosting his self-confidence.

Cipolla's assassination by Mario, a native of Torre di Venere who was the last one abused by the magician on stage, is not seen as a tragedy but as liberation by the author and the audience.

== Adaptations ==
Luchino Visconti adapted Mario and the Magician as a ballet choreographed by Leonid Massine and set to music by Franco Mannino. When Visconti discussed his approach with Mann in Rome, Mann told him that he had had the same ideas about the story. When it was finally staged in 1956, it won the Diaghilev Prize.

Klaus Maria Brandauer directed a 1994 film adaptation starring Julian Sands as the patriarch and himself as Cipolla.

The story has been adapted as an opera several times. Stephen Oliver's adaptation was premiered in 1988 at the Battignano Festival. The next year, the Hungarian composer János Vajda wrote a one-act opera set to a libretto by Gábor Bókkon. A recording was issued in 1990 on the Hungaroton label. A three-hour-long opera adaptation by composer Harry Somers with lyrics by Rod Anderson premiered 19 May 1992 at the Elgin Theatre, Toronto. Librettist J. D. McClatchy and composer Francis Thorne also adapted the story into an opera. It was first performed in 2005 by the Center for Contemporary Opera in the auditorium of Hunter College. A recording of this production was released on compact disc by Albany Records in 2006. The original cast included Justin Vickers as Mario, Larry Small, Jessica Grigg, Wendy Brown, Beata Safari, Sankofa Sarah Wade, Jim Gaylord, Eric Jordan, Isai Jess Muñoz, Leandra Ramm, Richard Cassell, Jason Cammorata and Nathan Resika. Briscula the Magician is an operatic adaptation by Bob Misbin with music by Frances Pollock. It was performed in Silver Spring, Maryland in March 2020 by Bel Cantanti Opera. In this adaptation the magician prevails. This change reflects the history of the ascendance of fascism in Europe not yet evident when Mann published his story in 1929. As noted by Dr. Mark Dreisonstok in Maryland Theatre Guide, March 7 2020, this opera is an "accessible entry point" into the work of Thomas Mann.
