= Byzantium (play) =

Historical play by Ferenc Herczeg

Byzantium (Hungarian: Bizánc)
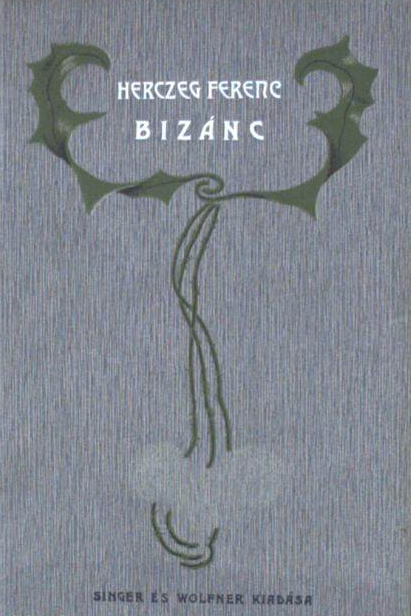
- Byzantium, 1st edition
- Written by: Ferenc Herczeg
- Characters: Emperor Constantine; Empress Iréne; Dimitrios, grand duke of Byzantium; Thomas, grand duke of Byzantium; Olga, grand duchess of Byzantium; The Patriarch; Zenobia, confidante of the empress Laskaris, Admiral of Byzantium; Giovanni Giustiniani, captain of the Genoeese mercenaries Herma, Greek virgin Ahmed Khan, Turkish ambassador
- Original language: Hungarian
- Subject: Fall of Constantinople
- Genre: Historical drama
- Setting: Byzantium, May 19, 1453

Premiere
- Date premiered: Apr 22, 1904
- Place premiered: National Theatre (Budapest)

Byzantium (Hungarian: Bizánc) is a historical play by Ferenc Herczeg presenting the last hours of the existence of the Byzantine Empire before the Fall of Constantinople. The play opened at the National Theatre in Budapest on April 22, 1904. Based on this play, composer György Selmeczi wrote the opera Byzantium, which premiered in 2014 at the Hungarian Opera of Cluj-Napoca.

== Play ==
Ferenc Herczeg was one of the most important Hungarian playwrights and writers of the beginning of the 20th century, a representative of the conservator-nationalist literature in Hungary. Sándor Hevesi, critic, playwright and director of the National Theatre of Budapest at the beginning of the 20th century considered Byzantium to be the most successful Hungarian play of all times.

The historic play Byzantium opened in Budapest in 1904. The following year, on May 19, 1905 premiered at the Hungarian Theatre of Cluj-Napoca. The play was a big success and the directions of the theaters scheduled replays nearly every theatrical season. From 1905 to 1944 Byzantium was played 78 times in Budapest and 42 times in Cluj-Napoca. During the communist regime, the writings of Ferenc Herczeg were forbidden and his plays not performed any more.

The play's action takes place on May 19, 1453, the last day of the Byzantine Empire, when the city of Constantinople was conquered by the Turks. The play presents the hopeless efforts of emperor Constantine XI Palaiologos and his Genoese mercenaries to defend the city against the Ottoman assailants. However, because of the superior forces their enemies and, even more, because of the internal conflicts of the Byzantine commanders and due to a succession of betrayals, the city is finally conquered by the Turks. The author paints a decadent Byzantium, the main characteristic being the loss of moral values, where only the personal interest is taken into account.

Though some critics considered that the play presents a symbolic message regarding the conditions which lead to the disappearance of several states in the first half of the 20th century, such an allegoric interpretation is difficult to accept for a work published in 1904, especially as the play does not include any references, phrases or situations which could justify such an interpretation. The play does contain some aphorisms, like the one stating: ”Each nation dies the moment it starts to dig its own grave”.

György Selmeczi, who adapted the play by writing the opera, states: "In Byzantium, the historic action is based on a problematic which, even today, has not lost its authenticity. This theme is linked to the idea of relativization and degradation of values which is characteristic to the entire contemporaneous era. Part of this phenomenon is the moral crisis, the perverted society of Byzantium being a typical example of such a crisis, where treason and ethical decay are the characteristics of a society which is on the verge of dissolution and decay. The fundamental elements of human society disintegrate and thus a crisis develops in which everybody is a loser. It is a theme which can be and should be actualized, because, despite the centuries which have passed since, we can, even today, talk about a degradation of values, about a chance in the sense of morality. Thus, the central theme of the play is valid even today.”

== Opera ==
Based on the play, György Selmeczi wrote a two-act opera on a libretto by Zsuzsa Kapecz and György Selmeczi

The opera also includes innovations in the music. Thus the sound of the Byzantium bells, heard at the beginning of the second act is a composition element of electronic music. The sound of the bells was recorded at different cathedrals in Hungary. The final composition was created using and mixing these sounds. During the performance, the music is first heard from these recordings, continuing with the sound of the orchestra's, continuing with a melody performed by the string instruments.

The world premiere of the opera took place on June 14, 2014, at the Summer Theatre of Miskolc played by the artist of the Hungarian Opera of Cluj-Napoca. The premiere in Romania took place on Sunday, September 21, 2014 la Cluj-Napoca.

Talking about the music, conductor Zsolt Jankó considered that it helps emphasize the dramatic character of the text: "We find moments of Turkish music, Renaissance music and even parts of baroque music, all extremely well balanced. The soloists are extraordinary and have to perform some extremely difficult parts. Though it is a drama, after the conclusion, we do not leave the opera in pain, but we are helped to look ever so slightly upwards, to the sky. It is a superb opera”.
