= István Láng =

Hungarian composer (1933–2023)

- Láng, c. 2009
- Born: 1 March 1933; Budapest, Hungary
- Died: 23 October 2023 (aged 90)
- Education: Franz Liszt Academy of Music
- Occupations: Composer; Academic teacher
- Organizations: Franz Liszt Academy of Music; International Society for Contemporary Music

István Láng (Hungarian: [ˈiʃtvaːn ˈlaːŋɡ]; 1 March 1933 – 23 October 2023) was a Hungarian composer, academic teacher and member of the board for international music organisations. Besides freelance composing, he worked as an academic teacher of chamber music at the Franz Liszt Academy of Music, lecturing internationally in the United States and Mexico. He was secretary general of the Association of Hungarian Musicians from 1978 to 1990, and a member of the board of the International Society for Contemporary Music and the International Music Council (UNESCO).

In his compositions, Láng used serial techniques, influenced by composers such as Pierre Boulez, Karlheinz Stockhausen and others whose music he had met at the Warsaw Autumn and the Darmstädter Ferienkurse, in a synthesis with traditional Hungarian elements from Béla Bartók's music. He was instrumental in creating a studio for electronic music in Hungary. His compositions have been described as theatrical even in concert pieces.

== Life ==
Born in Budapest on 1 March 1933, Láng first took private music lessons. He studied composition at the Franz Liszt Academy of Music from 1950 to 1958, first with János Viski and later with Ferenc Szabó. He was a freelance composer. He attended the Warsaw Autumn in 1958, where he was exposed to music by Karlheinz Stockhausen, Luigi Nono, Witold Lutosławski and John Cage. Láng then pointed out the importance of a studio for electronic music in Hungary, and took part in the HEAR Studio for recordings and live performances of it from 1974. In 1963, he attended the Darmstädter Ferienkurse, where Stockhausen, György Ligeti, Pierre Boulez and Luciano Berio lectured.

Láng was a music assistant to Kálmán Nádasdy, lecturing at the Theatre and Film Academy from 1957 to 1960, and worked as musical adviser to the State Puppet Theatre from 1966 to 1984. In 1973 he joined the staff of the chamber music department of the Liszt Academy, first as lecturer, later as professor. He also lectured as a guest, at the University of Colorado in 1973, the Conservatorio Nacional de Música in Mexico City in 1985 and 1987, and at the University of New Mexico in 1988.

Láng was a member of juries of international competitions, sometimes as president, between 1970 and 1990, including contests for choirs, brass wind chamber music, horn, oboe, trumpet, and composition. He served as secretary general of the Association of Hungarian Musicians from 1978 to 1990, was a member of the executive committees of the International Society for Contemporary Music (ISCM) from 1984 to 1987, and of the International Music Council (UNESCO) from 1989 to 1993.

Láng was twice awarded the Erkel Prize both in 1968 and 1975, was made Artist of Merit in 1985, and was awarded the Bartók-Pásztori Prize in 1994. He received the Artisjus Prize in 2005, and the Commander's Cross of Hungarian Order of Merit in 2009.

István Láng died on 23 October 2023, at age 90.

== Music ==
Láng composed operas,, ballets, four symphonies, and chamber music, including electro-acoustic music. He had an affinity to theatre, with a "dramaturgic sense" showing even in instrumental works.

In his early mature works, Láng adopted the serial techniques that had become fashionable in the early 1960s, showing the influence of Boulez and Schoenberg, but still managing a clever and effective synthesis of these styles with traditional Hungarian elements derived from Bartók in all areas: melody, harmony, rhythm, and texture—a synthesis perhaps best demonstrated in his Variations and Allegro (1965), which is an arrangement of an earlier symphony. His music from this period is marked by an absorption of the theatre, even in chamber and solo instrumental works, such as Monodia for clarinet, which is intended for stage or concert performance. Other important works from the sixties are the first two Wind Quintets (1963 and 1966), a ballet on Thomas Mann's Mario and the Magician (1962), and a Chamber Cantata to words by Attila József (1962). Another feature of Láng's style is the use of cyclic form, and his later music tends to consist of sequences of short movements constructed from small motifs, which he called "micro-organisms". These traits are found, for example, in his Second Wind Quintet of 1966 and Third String Quartet of 1978. The movements in such works are often linked by improvisatory solo interludes, as in the Second String Quartet of 1966. In works such as Gyász-zene (Funeral music) and Laudate hominem, he used mathematical series like the Fibonacci sequence to determined the proportions of the movements.

Although Láng also worked briefly with electronic music as early as 1974 (Surface Metamorphoses), he turned seriously to this medium beginning only in the late 1990s, for example Esteledés (Nightfall, 1997), which uses live electronics to manipulate sounds of a trumpet and Korean bell. More recent works with electronics are the Capriccio metronomico for tape (2001), and the Third Chamber Cantata, "No Man Is an Island", to words of John Donne (2001), for soprano, five instruments, and tape.

== Works ==
His works were published by Editio Musica Budapest. They include:

- Chamber Cantata No. 1 (1962)
- Mario and the Magician, ballet (1962)
- Wind Quintet No. 1 (1963)
- Duo for two flutes (1963)
- Variations and Allegro for orchestra (1965)
- String Quartet No. 2 (1966)
- Wind Quintet No. 2 (1966)
- Duo for two trombones (1972)
- Rhymes for flute, clarinet, viola, cello and piano (1972)
- Surface Metamorphoses, electronic music (1974)
- Constellations for oboe quartet (1975)
- Solo for six flutes (1975)
- Wind Quintet No. 3 (1975)
- Violin Concerto (1976–1977)
- String Quartet No. 3 (1978)
- Double Concerto for Clarinet, Harp and Orchestra (1979–1980)
- A Dream about the Theatre, opera (1977–1981)
- Affetti for clarinet, violin, cello and harp (1986)
- Intarzia egy Bartók-témára (Intarsia around a Bartók Theme) for string trio (1989)
- Violin Sonata (1990)
- Cello Sonata (1992)
- Viviofa for viola, bassoon and vibraphone (1995)
- Esteledés (Nightfall), live electronics to manipulate trumpet and Korean bell
- Capriccio metronomico for tape (2001)
- Chamber Cantata No. 3 "No Man Is an Island", for soprano, five instruments, and tape (2001)
- Four symphonies
- Xylophone Concerto
- Concerto bucolico for horn and orchestra
- Music 2-3-4 for chamber ensemble
- Gyász-zene (Funeral Music) for orchestra
- Sentences from Romeo and Juliet for strings
- Impulsioni for oboe and ensemble
- Monodia for solo clarinet
- Two Preludes for a Postlude for bassoon and string trio
- Chamber Cantata No. 1 "In Memoriam N. N. I."
- Chamber Cantata No. 2 "Laudate hominum"
- Starfighters, ballet-cantata
- Hiperbola, ballet
- A gyáva (The Coward), opera
