= Isbé =

Opera by Jean-Joseph Cassanéa de Mondonville

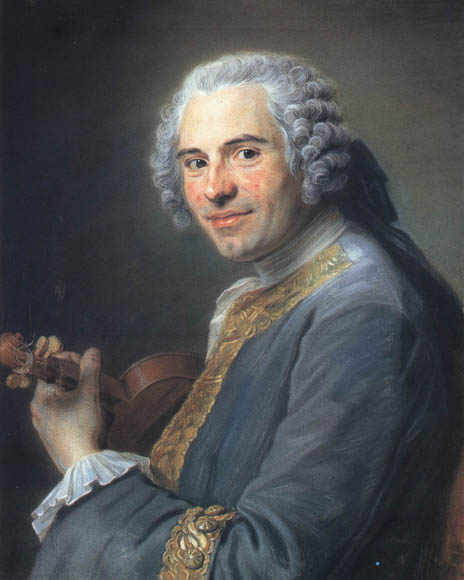
Jean-Joseph de Mondonville, by Maurice Quentin de La Tour, ca. 1746

Isbé is a 1742 opera by Jean-Joseph Cassanéa de Mondonville to a libretto by Henri-Francois de La Rivière (1648–1738) A pastorale héroïque in 5 acts and a prologue, the opera was premiered in Paris on 10 April 1742. The plot concerns Adamas, chief Druid, who conceives a passion for Isbé.

== Recordings ==
- 2016: Katherine Watson, Isbé; Reinoud Van Mechelen, Coridon; Thomas Dolié, Adamas; Chantal Santon-Jeffery, Desire / Charite; Alain Buet, Iphis / Third hamadryad; Blandine Folio-Peres, Fashion / Céphise; Rachel Redmond, Ámor / A shepherdess / Clymėne / A nymph; Artavazd Sargsyan, Tircis / First hamadryad / Forest god; Komáromi Márton, Second hamadryad, Purcell Choir, Orfeo Orchestra, György Vashegyi. Glossa Records
