= Kamilló Lendvay =

Hungarian composer, conductor, and music educator

Kamilló Lendvay (28 December 1928; Budapest, Hungary − 30 November 2016; Budapest, Hungary) was a prominent award-winning Hungarian composer, conductor, and music educator of the 20th and 21st centuries whose works have been performed throughout the world, including in the United States, Europe, and Asia.

Lendvay was born in Budapest and attended the Franz Liszt Academy of Music from 1949 to 1957, where he studied with János Viski and László Somogyi. He began his career in Szeged as a conductor, music coach, and director of the choir at Szeged Opera and then was musical director of the State Puppet Theatre from 1960 to 1966, musical director of the Hungarian Army Art Ensemble from 1966 to 1968, and conductor and (from 1972) musical director of the Budapest Operetta Theatre from 1970 to 1974. He was a professor at the Liszt Academy from 1972 to 1992, where he was head of the music theory department from 1976.

"That musicians, not only myself, find enjoyment in my work has always been my guiding principle. Also, I have never compromised in matters of style, regardless of prevailing fashion or the presumed taste of the public, or other considerations. My law is the unity between theme, harmony, and form. In my many decades of composition, I remained faithful to these principles."

He received, among others, the following awards: Erkel Prize (1962, 1964, 1978), Grand Prix International du Disque Lyrique (1979), Merited Artist (1981), Bartók-Pásztory Award (1989, 2005), Excellent Artist (1996), Silver Pen Award (1998), Kossuth Prize (1998), and Artisjus Music Award (2003).
