= Jean-Joseph de Mondonville =

French composer and violinist (1711-1772)

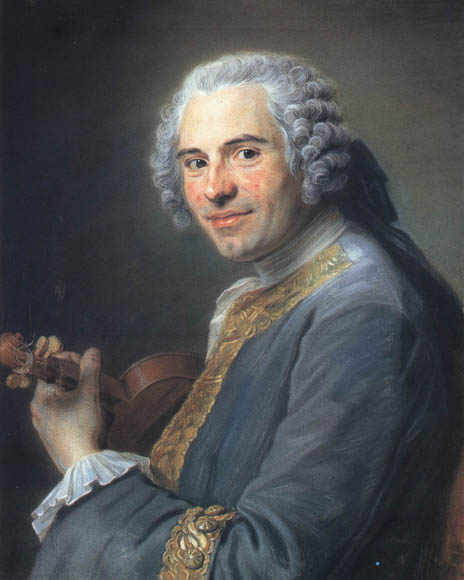
- Portrait by Maurice Quentin de La Tour, ca. 1746
- Born: Narbonne, Kingdom of France
- Baptised: 25 December 1711
- Died: 8 October 1772 (aged 60); Belleville, Paris, Kingdom of France

Jean-Joseph de Mondonville (French pronunciation: [ʒɑ̃ ʒozɛf də mɔ̃dɔ̃vil], 25 December 1711 (baptised) – 8 October 1772), also known as Jean-Joseph Cassanéa de Mondonville, was a French violinist and composer. He was a younger contemporary of Jean-Philippe Rameau and enjoyed great success in his day. Pierre-Louis Daquin (son of the composer Louis-Claude Daquin) claimed, "If I couldn't be Rameau, there's no one I would rather be than Mondonville".

== Life ==
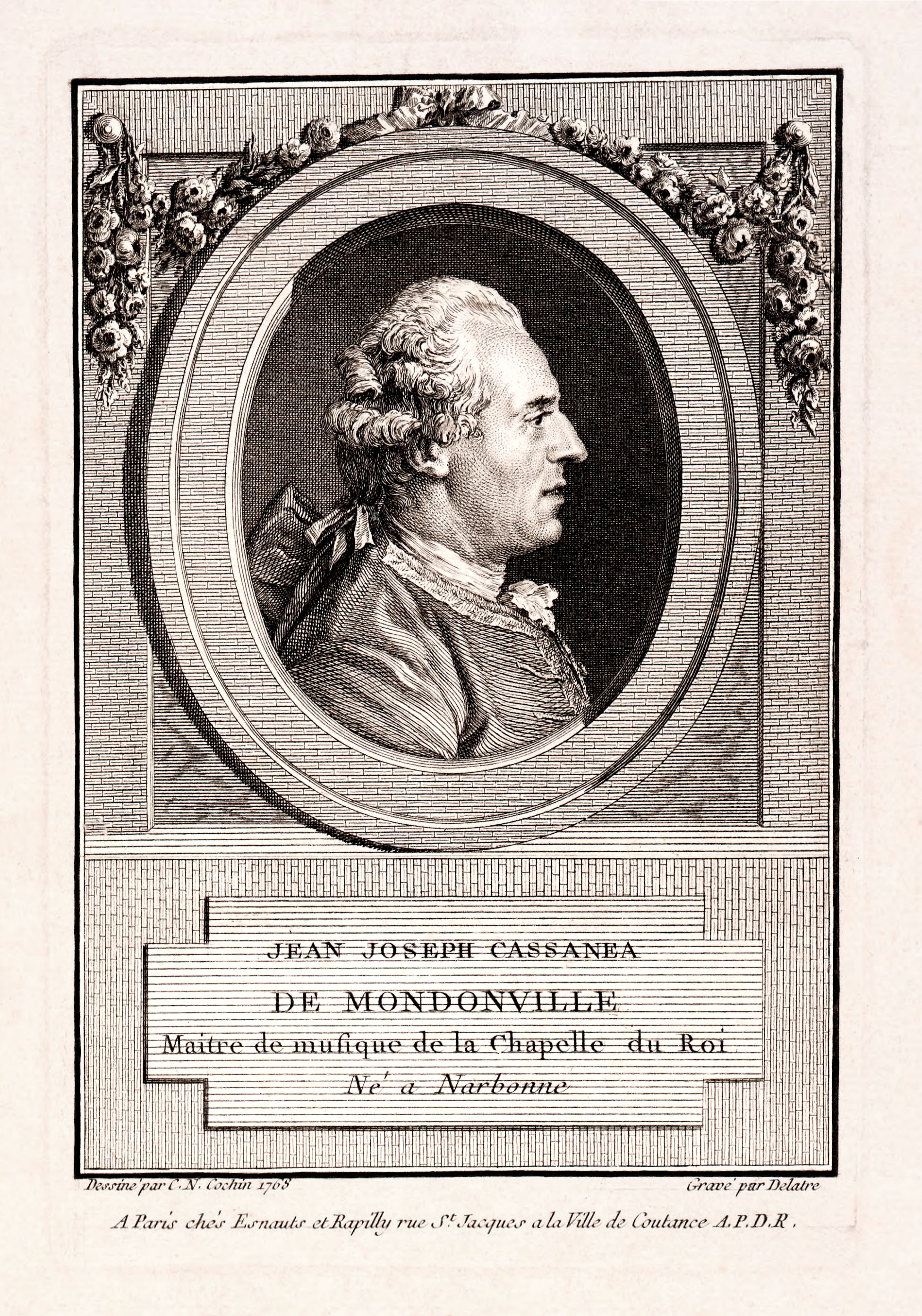
Mondonville, 1768 engraving

Mondonville was born in Narbonne in Occitania (South France) to an aristocratic family which had fallen on hard times. In 1733, he moved to Paris where he gained the patronage of the king's mistress Madame de Pompadour and won several musical posts, including violinist for the Concert Spirituel.

His first opus was a volume of violin sonatas, published in 1733. He became a violinist of the Chapelle royale and chamber and performed in some 100 concerts. Some of his grands motets were also performed that year, receiving considerable acclaim. He was appointed sous-maître in 1740 and, in 1744, intendant of the Chapelle royale. He produced operas and grand motets for the Opéra and Concert Spirituel respectively, and was associated with the Théatre des Petits-Cabinets, all the while maintaining his career as a violinist throughout the 1740s. In 1755, he became director of the Concert Spirituel on the death of Pancrace Royer. Mondonville died in Belleville near Paris at the age of sixty.

== Music ==
=== Sacred music ===
Between 1734 and 1755, Mondonville composed 17 grands motets, of which only nine have survived. The motet Venite exultemus domino, published in 1740, won him the post of Maître de musique de la Chapelle (Master of Music of the Chapel). Thanks to his mastery of both orchestral and vocal music, Mondonville brought to the grand motet — the dominant genre of music in the repertory of the Chapelle royale (Royal Chapel) before the French Revolution — an intensity of colour and a dramatic quality hitherto unknown. In 1758, he introduced oratorios as a new genre at the Concert Spirituel.

=== Operas ===
Although Mondonville's first stage work, Isbé, was a failure, he enjoyed great success with the lighter forms of French Baroque opera: the opéra-ballet and the pastorale héroïque. His most popular works were Le carnaval de Parnasse, Titon et l'Aurore and Daphnis et Alcimadure (for which he wrote his own libretto in Languedocien, his native dialect of the Occitan language). Titon et l'Aurore played an important role in the Querelle des Bouffons, the controversy between partisans of French and Italian opera which raged in Paris in the early 1750s. Members of the "French party" ensured that Titon's premiere was a resounding success (their opponents even alleged they had guaranteed this result by packing the Académie Royale de Musique, where the staging took place, with royal soldiers). Mondonville's one foray into serious French opera - the genre known as tragédie en musique - was a failure however. He took the unusual step of re-using a libretto, Thésée, which had originally been set in 1675 by the "father of French opera", Jean-Baptiste Lully. Mondonville's bold move to substitute Lully's much-loved music with his own did not pay off. The premiere at the court in 1765 had a mixed reception and a public performance two years later ended with the audience demanding it be replaced by the original. Yet Mondonville was merely ahead of his time - in the 1770s, it became fashionable to reset Lully's tragedies with new music, the most famous example being Armide by Gluck.

== List of works ==
=== Instrumental ===
- Op.1 - Sonates pour violon (1733)
- Op.2 - 6 Sonates en trio pour deux Violons avec la basse continue Œuvre Second, Dédiées à Monsieur le Marquis de la Bourdonnaye, gravées par Le Duc, (Paris 1734)
- Op.3 - 6 Pièces de clavecin en sonates (1734) and orchestrated as Sonates en symphonies (1749)
- Op.4 - "Les sons harmoniques" (Paris and Lille, 1738) The preface contains the first evidence of a written text concerning playing with string harmonics
- Op.5 - Pièces de clavecin avec voix ou violon (1748)

=== Operas ===
- Isbé (1742)
- Bacchus et Erigone (1747) (Later reused/adapted as Act 2 of Les fêtes de Paphos)
- Le carnaval du Parnasse (1749)
- Vénus et Adonis (1752) (Later reused/adapted as Act 1 of Les fêtes de Paphos)
- Titon et l'Aurore (1753)
- Daphnis et Alcimadure (1754)
- Les fêtes de Paphos (1758)
- Thésée (1765) (music lost)
- Les projets de l'Amour (1771) (music lost)

=== Grands motets ===
Mondonville's nine surviving grands motets are:

- Dominus regnavit (Psalm 92) (1734)
- Jubilate Deo (Psalm 100) (1734)
- Magnus Dominus (Psalm 48) (1734)
- Cantate domino (Psalm 150) (1743)
- Venite exultemus (Psalm 95) (1743)
- Nisi Dominus (Psalm 127) (1743)
- De profundis (Psalm 130) (1748)
- Coeli enarrant (Psalm 19) (1750)
- In exitu Israel (Psalm 114) (1753)

=== Oratorios ===
Mondonville's three oratorios (none survive) were:

- Les Israélites à la Montagne d'Oreb (1758)
- Les Fureurs de Saul (1759)
- Les Titans (1761)

== Recordings of works by Mondonville ==
As of 2016, all extant sacred works by Mondonville had been recorded and as of 2024, all extant operatic/dramatic works had also been recorded.

=== Motets ===
- Grand motet: Cantate Domino, Chorale des Jeunesses Musicales de France, Orchestre Jean-François Paillard, dir. Louis Martini, Erato (1963)
- Grand motets : Venite exultemus, Dominus regnavit, Ensemble Regional "A Coeur Joie", Ensemble "Adam de la Halle" d'Arras, Orchestre De Chambre Jean-François Paillard, dir. Jean-François Paillard, Erato (1981)
- Grands motets : Venite exultemus; De profundis. Petits motets : Regna terrae; In decachordo psaltorio; Benefac Domine, London Baroque, Choir of New College Oxford, dir. Edward Higginbottom, 1 CD Hyperion (1988) (OCLC 517682353); réédition, 1 CD Hyperion, coll. « Helios » (2000) (OCLC 50117510)
- Grands motets : Dominus regnavit, In exitu Israël, De profundis, Les Arts florissants, dir. William Christie, 1 CD Erato (1997) (OCLC 255380558)
- Grand motets : Coeli enarrant, Venite Exultemus, Jubilate Deo, Chantres de la Chapelle, Ensemble baroque de Limoges, dir. Christophe Coin, (1 CD Auvidis Astrée (1997)
- Grand motet: Nisi Dominus, Le Parnasse Français, dir. Louis Castelain, Only available on YouTube (2003)
- Grand motet: Dominus regnavit, Tafelmusik, dir. Ivars Taurins, CBC Records (2007)
- Grands motets : Cantate Domino, Magnus Dominus, De profundis, Nisi Dominus, Purcell Choir, Orfeo Orchestra, dir. Gyögy Vashegyi, Glossa (2016)
- Grands motets : In exitu Israël, Dominus Regnavit, Coeli enarrant, Choeur & Orchestre Marguerite Louise, dir. Gaétan Jarry, Château de Versailles Spectacles (2022)
- Grand motet: In exitu Israël, Le Concert d’Astrée, dir. Emmanuelle Haïm, Warner Classics (2023)

=== Instrumental Music (List Incomplete) ===
- Pièces de clavecin en sonates avec accompagnement de violon, œuvre 3, Florence Malgoire (violin), Christophe Rousset (harpsichord) 1 CD Verany (1990)
- Six sonates en symphonie, op. 3, Les Musiciens du Louvre, dir. Marc Minkowski, 1 CD Archiv Produktion (1998) (OCLC 956264542); réédition, 1 CD Archiv Produktion coll. "Blue" (2003) (OCLC 724831406)
- Pièces de clavecin avec voix ou violon, op. 5, Luc Beauséjour, Shannon Mercer, Hélène Plouffe, 1 CD Analekta (2008) (OCLC 705324011)
- Sonates en trio, opus 2, Ensemble Diderot, Johannes Pramsohler, violin, Audax (2016)

=== Dramatic works ===
- Daphnis et Alcimadure (Abridged version), Orquèstre e Còrs del Teatre de Montpelhièr, dir. Louis Bertholon, Ventadorn (1981)
- Titon et l'Aurore, Ensemble Vocal Françoise Herr, Les Musiciens du Louvre, dir. Marc Minkowski, 2 CD Erato (1992) (OCLC 39039271)
- Les Fêtes de Paphos, Choeur de Chambre Accentus, Les Talens Lyriques, dir. Christophe Rousset, 3 CD L'Oiseau-Lyre (1997)
- Isbé, Purcell Choir, Orfeo Orchestra, dir. György Vashegyi, Glossa (2017)
- Titon et l'Aurore, Les Arts Florissants, dir. William Christie, Naxos DVD (2021)
- Daphnis et Alcimadure (Complete opera), Orchestre Baroque de Montauban, Ensemble Les Passions, dir. Jean-Marc Andrieu, 2 CD Ligia Digital (2023)
- Le carnaval du Parnasse, Les Ambassadeurs - La Grande Écurie, Choeur de Chambre de Namur, dir. Alexis Kossenko, Château de Versailles Spectacles (2024)

== Sources ==
- Brief biographical entry in the Grove Concise Dictionary of Music, 1994, published by Oxford University Press, Inc. on the Gramophone website.
- Booklets to the above recordings
- The Viking Opera Guide ed. Amanda Holden (Viking, 1993)
- C. Pierre, Histoire du Concert spirituel (Paris: Société française de musicologie, 1975).
- R. Machard, Jean-Joseph Cassanea de Mondonville: Virtuose, compositeur et Chef d'orchestre (Béziers: Société de Musicologie du Languedoc, 1980).
