= Daphnis et Alcimadure =

Opera by Jean-Joseph Cassanéa de Mondonville

- Opera by Jean-Joseph Cassanéa de Mondonville
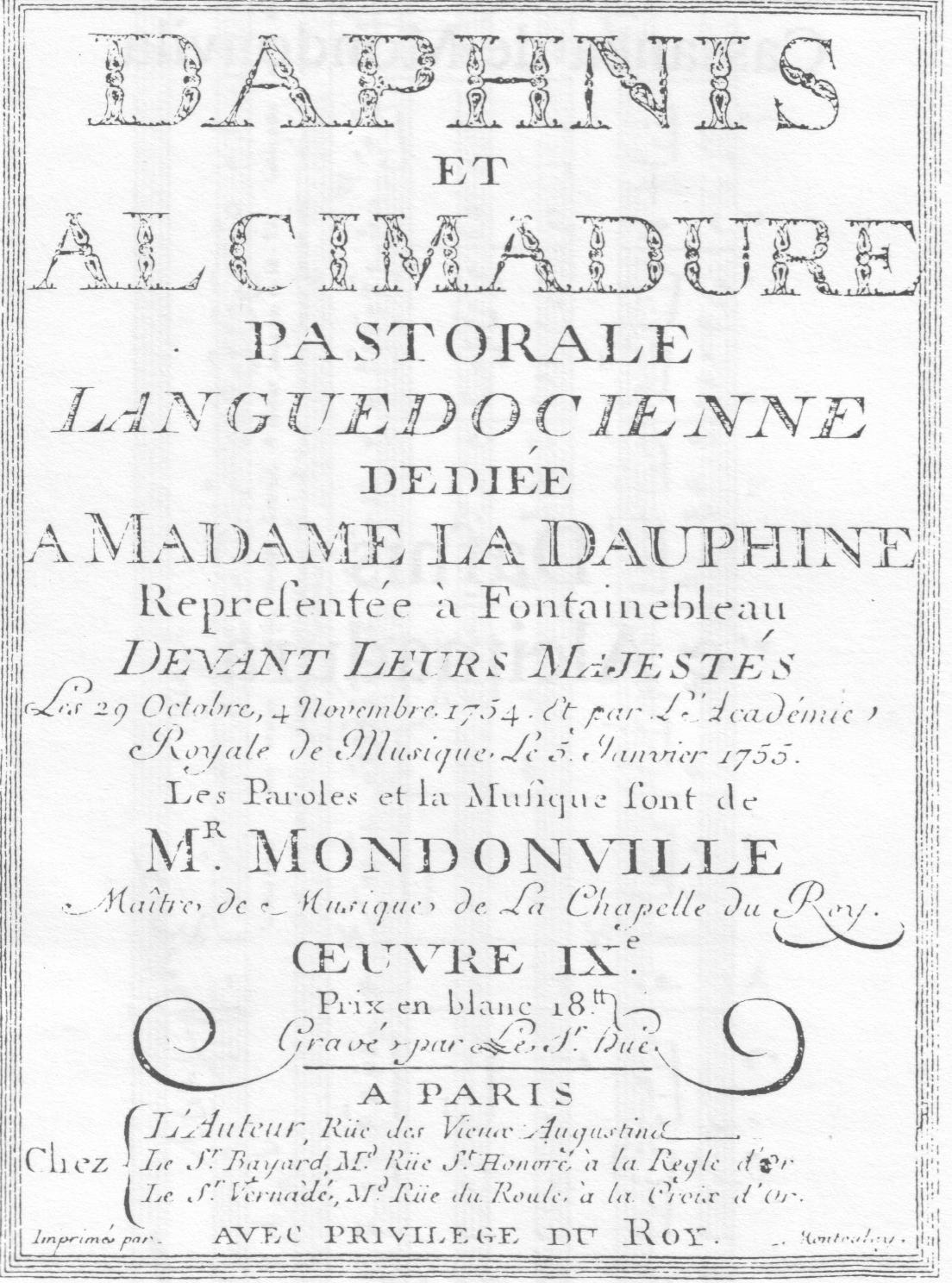
- Librettist: Mondonville and Claude-Henri de Fusée de Voisenon
- Language: Occitan language
- Based on: La Fontaine's fable
- Premiere: 29 October 1754; Palace of Fontainebleau

Daphnis et Alcimadure (in Occitan classical norm, Dafnís e Alcimadura, or according to the original libretto spelling, Daphnis e Alcimaduro) is an opera by the Baroque violinist, conductor and composer Jean-Joseph Cassanéa de Mondonville to a libretto in the Occitan language, written by the composer himself and loosely inspired by La Fontaine's fable bearing the same title. It takes the form of a pastorale in three acts and was later endowed with a prologue in French entitled Les jeux floraux, to a libretto by Claude-Henri de Fusée de Voisenon.

== History, criticism and interpretation ==
The opera was first staged on 29 October and 4 November 1754 at the Palace of Fontainebleau and performed before King Louis XV and his court. It was quite successful and the last act duet was repeated as an encore. Its public premiere was held by the Paris Opéra at the Théâtre du Palais-Royal on 29 December 1754, when the French prologue was added.

Mondonville asked two stars of the Paris Opéra to perform his work: the prima donna Marie Fel from Bordeaux and the primo uomo Pierre Jélyotte from Béarn. Both Bordeaux and Béarn are traditionally Occitan-speaking regions, though of Gascon and Béarnais dialects, whereas Mondonville wrote in the Languedocien dialect. The third role of the pastorale, Jeanet, was assigned to another tenor of the company, Jean-Paul Spesoller, generally known as Latour, who was born in Occitania as well, possibly at Carcassonne.

The opera was composed during the Querelle des Bouffons, an argument between partisans of French and Italian music. Mondonville supported the former, and according to Théodore Lajarte, he was prompted to employ his native Languedoc dialect because he intended to consolidate his leadership of the French faction. The German-born critic Melchior Grimm, a supporter of Italian music (and therefore not an admirer of Mondonville), approved the use of the Occitan language, as it was closer to Italian and thus partly able to camouflage the insipidity of Mondonville's work.

Daphnis et Alcimadure received a favourable review in the Mercure de France and the degree of its success may be gauged by the fact that it inspired several parodies: Jérôme et Fanchonnette ou Anacréon à la Grenouillère, "pastorale poissarde" (billingsgate pastorale) by Jean-Joseph Vadé (1719–1757), which was given at the Foire St Germain on 18 February 1755; Daphnis et Alcimadure performed in May 1756; Les Amours de Mathurine, "in two acts mêlés d'ariettes", by Jacques Lacombe (1724–1801), mounted at the Théatre Italien on 10 June 1756; and finally a work titled Alcimatendre, by Jean-François Mussot, called Arnould, (1734–1795), performed in 1773.

In 1762 the Paris Opéra considered reviving the opera, and, since all the Occitan-speaking first performers had retired from the company, Pierre Jéliotte, who was still active at Court (as was Marie Fel), was offered the considerable sum of 24,000 livres for 24 performances to be held at the Théâtre du Palais-Royal. The great tenor however was only waiting for the king's leave to retire permanently to his native region and refused the offer. The lack of native-speaking singers forced Mondonville to prepare a French translation of his opera, which, however, was not staged for the time being. On the contrary, two years later the original Occitan version was mounted again at Court, with Jéliotte and Fel singing the title roles and the newly engaged comic tenor of the Comédie-Italienne, Antoine Trial, who came from Avignon, replacing Latour as Jeanet. The French version had to wait until 1768 to be staged, but did not earn much applause. It was however revived again on 17 March 1773, "but it had lost its novelty, and it had to be dropped from the repertory after its 12th representation in French at the Opéra", thus following the fate awaiting shortly the generality of old pre-Gluckian repertoire. Dialect versions were performed on several occasions in the south of France, where the Occitan still was the predominant language with difference.

Mondonville's Occitan opera was again performed (with decors by Jean Hugo) in Montpellier in 1981 and recorded in a heavily abridged version for LP. It was later produced in 1994–1996 by the Festival Déodat de Séverac at Montauban and Saint Félix Lauragais. In 1999 some extracts were included in a CD reconding entitled Musiques aux États du Languedoc. The entirety of the opera was finally recorded in 2022 by the Orchestre Baroque de Montauban and Ensemble Les Passions in honour of the 250th anniversary of Mondonville's death, and released in 2023.

== Roles ==
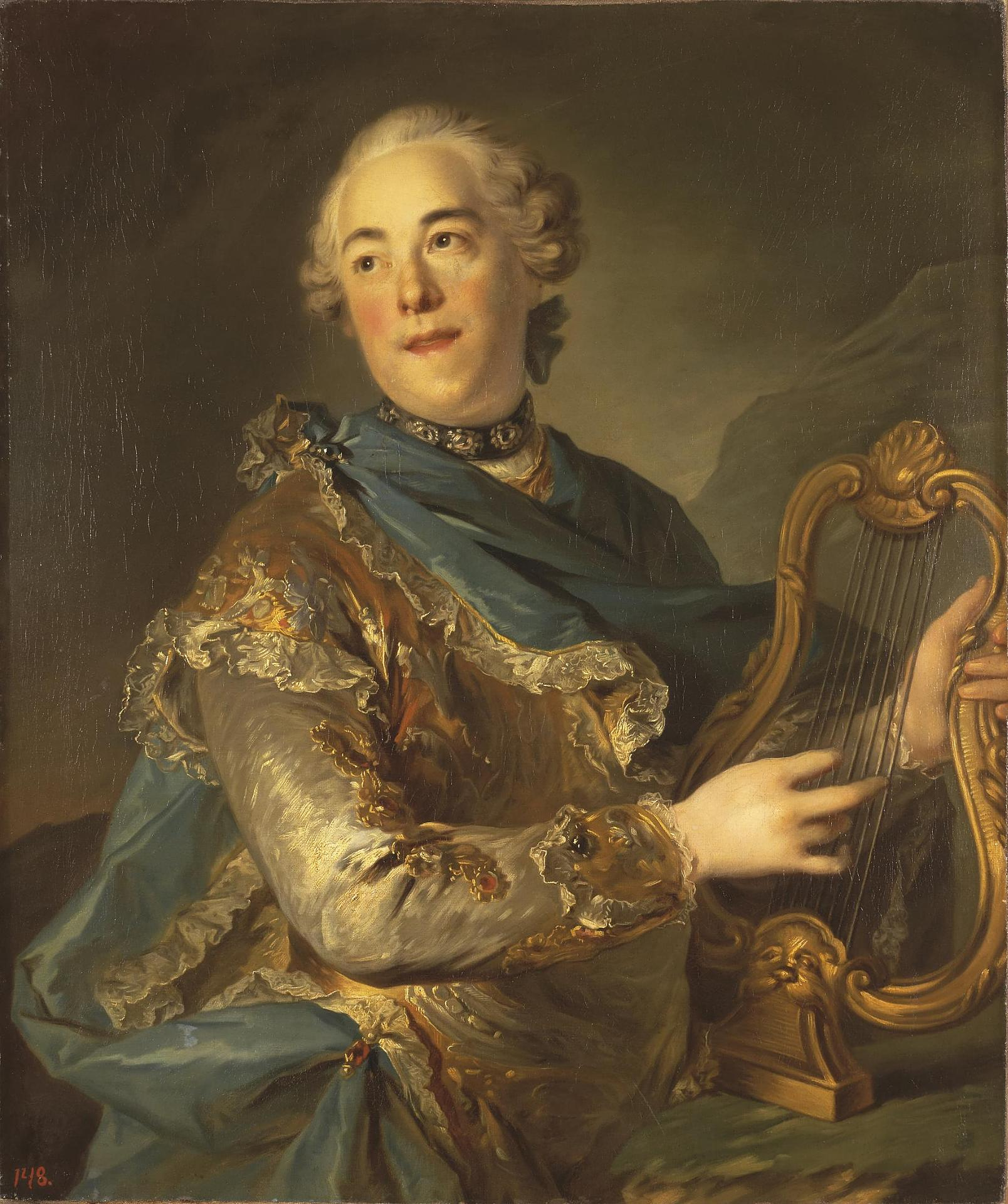
Pierre Jélyotte.

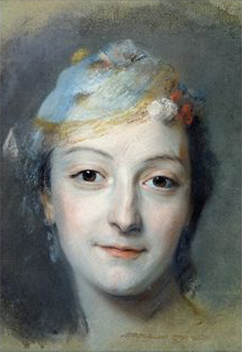
Marie Fel by Quentin de La Tour

Roles	Voice type	Premiere Cast
Prologue: "Les jeux floraux" ("Floral games"), first performed at the Paris Opéra premiere on 29 December 1754
Isaure	soprano	Marie-Jeanne Fesch, called "Mlle Chevalier"
Chorus: gardeners, commoners, nobles (of both sexes)
Soloist dancers: François-Robert Marcel, Marie-Françoise Lyonnois (gardeners), Gaétan Vestris, Mlle Riquet (commoners), Antoine Bandieri de Laval, M. Lyonnois, Louise-Madeleine Lany, Mlle Puvigné fille(nobles)
Pastorale: "Daphnis e Alcimaduro" ("Daphnis and Alcimadure") first performed at the Court premiere on 29 October 1754
Daphnis	haute-contre	Pierre Jélyotte
Alcimaduro/Alcimadure	soprano	Marie Fel
Jeanet	tenor	Jean-Paul Spesoller called (de) La Tour (or Latour)
Chorus: shepherds, shepherdesses, pastors, hunters, watermen, waterwomen
Soloist dancers: Mlle Puvigné fille (shepherdess - Act 1), Jean-Barthélemy Lany, G. Vestris, Marie-Françoise Lyonnois (pastors), Thérèse Vestris (shepherdess - Act 3), Jean-Barthélemy Lany and Louise-Madeleine Lany (bargees, pas de deux - Act 3)

== Synopsis ==
=== Prologue ===
The prologue, in French, invokes Clémence Isaure (the allegorical patroness of Occitan) as well as the Jeux Floraux as a way of evoking the idealised history of the Occitan language. After the prologue, the opera is wholly in Occitan.

=== Act 1 ===
Daphnis is a young shepherd in love with Alcimadure, but Alcimadure rejects him because she does not believe he is sincere. Jeanet, Alcimadure's brother, claims he can prove that Daphnis' love is true.

=== Act 2 ===
Jeanet disguises himself as a soldier and comes to find Daphnis. He boasts of his bravery in many battles and says he intends to marry Alcimadure as soon as he has killed a certain shepherd called Daphnis. Daphnis, far from being daunted, declares his love for the shepherdess. Just then, a scream is heard from Alcimadure. She is being chased by a wolf. Daphnis rushes to the rescue, kills the wolf and saves Alcimadure. Although she is grateful, Alcimadure still rejects his love.

=== Act 3 ===
Jeanet tries in vain to reason with Alcimadure. Daphnis, in despair, says he wants to die. When Jeanet tells his sister of Daphnis' death, she too says she no longer wants to live. She has secretly been in love with Daphnis. However, Daphnis' supposed death was just a ruse. He is still alive and the couple are now free to love one another.

== Selected recordings ==
- (Abridged), Ana-Miranda (Alcimadure), Alastair Thompson (Daphnis), Orchestre de Montpellier-Roussillon, Chœur du Théâtre De Montpellier -Roussillon, conducted by Louis Bertholon, 2 LP Ventadorn 1981 (enregistrement Live)
- (Extracts), Françoise Masset, La Symphonie du Marais, conducted by Hugo Reyne, Musique aux états du Languedoc, 1 CD Astrée, 1999.
- (First full recording), Élodie Fonnard (Alcimadure), François-Nicolas Geslot (Daphnis), Fabien Hyon (Janet), Hélène Le Corre (Clémence Isaure), Orchestre Baroque de Montauban, Ensemble Les Passions, conducted by Jean-Marc Andrieu, L'opéra occitan, 2 CD Ligia Digital 2023
