= Lajos Bárdos =

Hungarian musician (1899-1986)

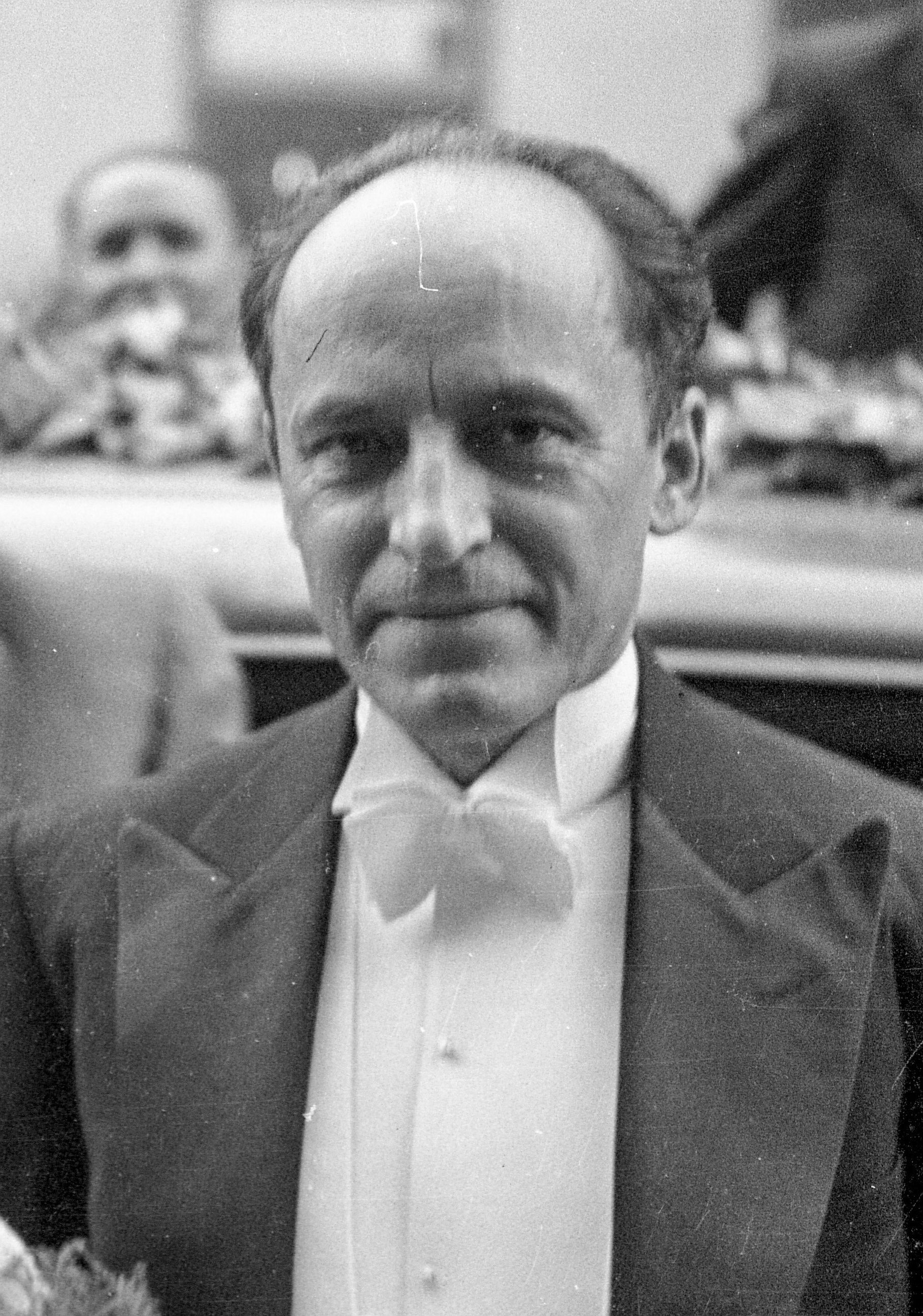
Lajos Bárdos in 1948

Lajos Bárdos (1 October 1899 – 18 November 1986) was a composer, conductor, music theorist, and professor of music at the Franz Liszt Academy of Music, in Budapest, Hungary, where he had previously studied under Albert Siklós and Zoltán Kodály. His younger brother, György Deák-Bárdos, was also a composer.

== Career ==
Together with Kodály, Bárdos laid the foundations of 20th-century Hungarian choral music. From 1928 to 1967 he was a professor at the Academy, where he reformed the syllabus––emphasizing the training of choral conductors, the teaching of church music history, and instruction in music theory and prosody. In 1931, along with György Kerényi and Gyula Kertész, he founded the publishing company Magyar Kórus (Hungarian Chorus), publishing 2,000 works of old masters and modern composers over the next 20 years, before being shut down by the communist regime in 1950. As the most active disseminator of sacred music in Hungary, Bárdos was targeted at the time with threatening criticism. (For example, one writer in the new journal Éneklö Nép (Singing People) proclaimed, "We must take care to eradicate men such as Lajos Bárdos as soon as possible!") The irony is that the rich supply of music provided by Magyar Kórus had allowed schools across Hungary to organize concerts based on those works. That same group of works also served as the basis for the "Singing Youth" movement, which Bárdos founded in 1934, and which encouraged young people across Hungary to join choral groups and learn the basics of music. And the impetus to promote choral music in the first place came largely from Kodály's observation––made when both he and Bárdos were young musicians––that whereas only a few of the elite had the privilege of having an education in instrumental music, on the other hand, "everybody has a voice".

Through his work as a conductor Bárdos raised the standards of Hungarian choral singing to the highest international level within decades. He directed several choirs and encouraged the development of choral activity in remote areas of the country. His repertory was pioneering: he included choral music from before Palestrina––especially that of Josquin––while also promoting new music (for instance, he directed the Palestrina Choir's performance of Stravinsky's Symphony of Psalms in 1932, to great success––and praises from Stravinsky). He also promoted new music in other ways. For example, in 1947 he invited Olivier Messiaen to Budapest, where he both lectured and performed for two weeks.

Bárdos' own compositions draw on Renaissance polyphony and Hungarian folk music, following in the tradition of Bartók and Kodály. In all, he composed some 800 pieces––including folk song arrangements, choral masses, motets, secular pieces based on poems, theatrical accompaniments, songs, and instrumental music.

Bárdos' work as a musicologist included major studies of Gregorian melody, modal and Romantic harmony, and the analysis of works by Liszt, Bartók, and Kodály. Well known papers include "The Modal Harmony in Liszt's Work", and "Heptatonia Secunda" (which is considered by some to be the best study of Kodály in all of musical literature). When the first essay of the volume Folk Rhythm in Bartók's Music was published, it inspired a younger generation to research Bartók further.

His lectures at the Academy were famous for their clarity and liveliness, and he had a full house at all times, regardless of the subject matter. His pupils at the Academy included György Kurtág, who decades later dedicated two compositions to him (Op. 11, song #2, and Op. 12). György Ligeti took the unusual step of regularly attending Bárdos' lectures while they were both teaching at the Academy. He later credited Bárdos' lectures with having an influence on his own early compositions.

Between the wars (for almost 20 years, until 1944) Bárdos composed the music for several large-scale "movement dramas" produced by the pioneering Hungarian modern dancer Valéria Dienes (herself a former student––and only authorized translator into Hungarian––of the French philosopher Henri Bergson, as well as being the founder of the first school of eurhythmics in Hungary).

The teaching methods that Bárdos developed contributed to what has since come to be known as the Kodály Method of musical training.

"Lajos Bárdos Music Week" has been an annual festival in Hungary since 1977.

== Filmography ==
Dalolva szép az élet (1950), directed by Márton Keleti.
