= János Viski =

Hungarian composer

János Viski (1906–1961) was a Hungarian composer, pianist and teacher.

János was born in Cluj-Napoca (at the time Kolozsvár, Hungary, now in Romania) on 10 June 1906. Despite his musical interest, it was necessary for him to go into farming. Soon however he was able to study violin, and then in 1927 he was admitted to the Franz Liszt Academy of Music where he became a student of Zoltán Kodály.

He died on 16 January 1961 in Budapest. His students included Erzsébet Szőnyi, István Láng, and Péter Eötvös.

His list of compositions includes several concertos and a symphonic poem among other works.
