= György Vashegyi =

Hungarian harpsichordist and conductor (born 1970)

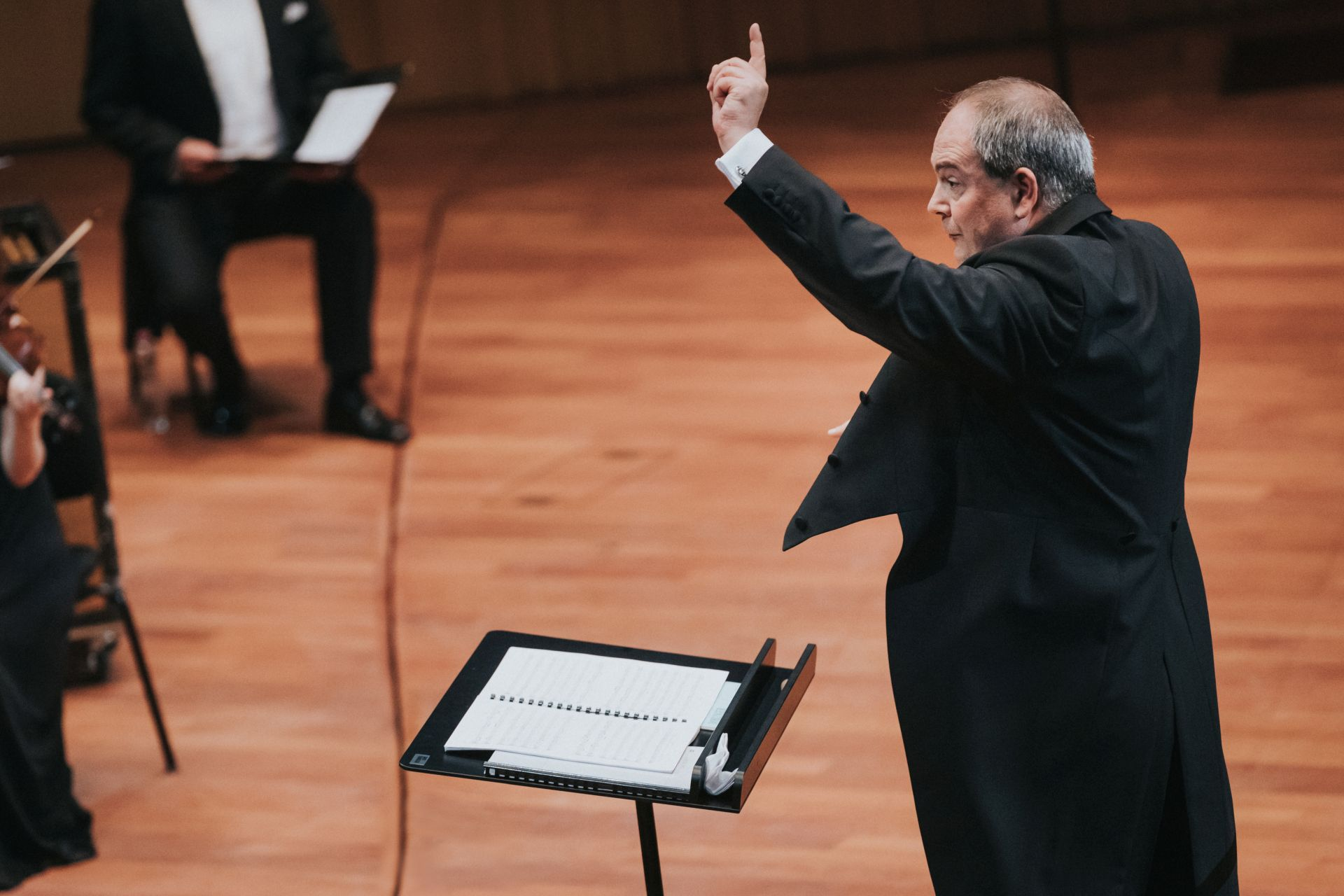
György Vashegyi, 2021

György Vashegyi (born 13 April 1970 in Budapest) is a Hungarian harpsichordist and conductor. He founded the Purcell Choir in 1990 for a performance of Dido and Aeneas. From November 2017 he was elected president of the Hungarian Academy of Arts (MMA, Magyar Művészeti Akadémia), founded in 1992.

== Selected recordings ==
- 2003: Marc-Antoine Charpentier – Messe à 8 voix et 8 violons et flûtes H.3, Domine salvum fac regem H.283, Motet pour les trépassés H.311, Purcell Choir, Orfeo Orchestra, conducted by György Vashegyi. CD Hungaroton classic.
- 2004: Marc-Antoine Charpentier – Messe des morts H.10, Salve Regina à trois choeurs H.24, Psaulmus Davidis H.207, Purcell Choir, Orfeo Orchestra, conducted by György Vashegyi. CD Hungaroton classic.
- 2014: Marc-Antoine Charpentier – Messe pour Mr Mauroy H.10, Domine salvum fac regem H.299, 5 Repons H.126, H.129, H.130, H.131, H.134, Purcell Choir, Orfeo Orchestra, conducted by György Vashegyi. CD Hungaroton classic.
- 2016: Jean-Joseph de Mondonville - Isbé, Katherine Watson, Isbé; Reinoud Van Mechelen, Coridon; Thomas Dolié, Adamas; Chantal Santon-Jeffery, Desire / Charite; Alain Buet, Iphis / Third hamadryad, Purcell Choir, Orfeo Orchestra, György Vashegyi, Glossa Records
- 2018: Jean-Philippe Rameau - Les Indes galantes, Chantal Santon-Jeffery (Hébé, Zima), Katherine Watson (Émilie), Véronique Gens (Phani), Reinoud Van Mechelen (DOM Carlos, Valère, Damon), Purcell Choir, Orfeo Orchestra, conducted By György Vashegyi. 2 CDs Glossa.
- 2019: Charles-Hubert Gervais – Hypermnestre, Katherine Watson (Hypermnestre), Mathias Vidal (Lyncée), Thomas Dolié (Danaüs), Philippe-Nicolas Martin (Arcas, ombre de Gélanor, le Nil), Chantal Santon-Jeffery (NaÏade, bergère, Coryphée), Juliette Mars (Isis, matelote), Manuel Munez Camelino (Grand Prêtre, Coryphée), Purcell Choir, Orfeo Orchestra, conducted by Giörgy Vashegyi. 2 CDs Glossa. Diapason d'Or
- 2019, Jean-Baptiste Lemoyne- Phèdre, Judith Van Wanroij (Phèdre), Julien Behr (Hippolyte), Tassis Christoyannism (Thésée), Purcell Choir, Orfeo, Orchestra, conducted by György Eashegy. 2 CD Bru Zane.
- 2020: Michel Pignolet de Montéclair- Jephté, Tassis Christoyannis (Jephté), Chantal Santon Jeffery (Iphise), Purcell Choir, Orfeo Orchestra, conducted by György Vashegy. 2 CDs Glossa.
- 2022: Charles-Hubert Gervais – Grand motets – Exaudi Deus, O filii et filiae, Judica me Deus, Uquequo Domine, Te Deum, Purcell Choir, Orfeo Orchestra, conducted by György Vashegyi. CD Glossa. Diapason d'Or
- 2023: Luigi Cherubini – Les Abencérages, Anaïs Constans, Edgaras Montvidas, Thomas Dolié, Orfeo Orchestra, Purcell Choir, György Vashegyi. 2 CDs Bru Zane BZ1050
- 2023: Jean Marie Leclair - Scylla et Glaucus, Judith van Wanroij (Scylla), Cyrille Dubois (Glaucus), Véronique Gens (Circé), Purcell Choir, Orfeo Orchestra, conducted by György Vashegyi. 2 CDs GLOSSA.
- 2024: Jean-Philippe Rameau - Les Boréades, Sabine Devieilhe (Alphise), Reinoud Van Mechelen (Albaris), Purcell Choir, Orfeo Orchestra, conductor György Vashegyi. 2 CDs Erato. Diapason d’or
