= György Deák-Bárdos =

György Deák-Bárdos (1905 in Budapest – 1991) was a Hungarian composer, organist, singer and music teacher. He was the younger brother of Lajos Bárdos.

== Works, editions and recordings ==
- 10 masses
- 70 cantatas, motets
- Parasceve Suite:
  - 1. Hymnus De Vanitate Mundi (1930)
  - 2. Tristis Est Anima Mea (1927)
  - 3. Crucifigatur, Pater! Dimitte Illis! (1928)
  - 4. Eli, Eli! (1928)
  - 5. Consummatum Est (1928)
