= László Halmos =

Hungarian composer and violinist

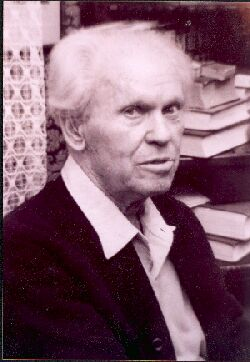
- Born: November 10, 1909; Nagyvárad, Austria-Hungary (now Oradea, Romania)
- Died: January 26, 1997 (aged 87); Győr, Hungary
- Occupations: Composer; choir director; violinist

László Halmos (10 November 1909, in Nagyvárad – 26 January 1997, in Győr) was a Hungarian composer, choir director and violinist.

He wrote choral works, songs, chamber music, oratorios, cantatas, masses, as well as works for orchestra and for the organ, totalling several hundred works. He was choir director of Gyór Cathedral and also held the position of professor at the Theological College and the State Conservatory. As a violinist, he was one of the early members of The New Hungarian Quartet.

== Works, editions and recordings ==
- Missa barbara
- Missa de Nativitate Domini
- Motets
