= Ferenc Kersch =

Hungarian composer

Ferenc Kersch (1853, in Bácsalmás – 1910, in Esztergom) was a Hungarian composer. He was a student of Liszt and teacher of Artúr Harmat.

== Works, editions and recordings ==
- Stabat Mater
- Te Deum
- Vespers

Recordings

- Dextera Domini on Musica Sacra Hungarica Budapest Monteverdi Choir, Eva Kollar
