= Péter Nógrádi =

Hungarian composer (born 1952)

Péter Nógrádi (born in Budapest in 1952) is a Hungarian composer. He studied with Pál Károlyi Pál, and at the Franz Liszt Academy of Music with József Soproni.
