= József Karai =

Hungarian composer

Jószef Karai (Budapest, 8 November 1927–7 September 2013) was a Hungarian composer. He studied composition with Ferenc Farkas at the Franz Liszt Academy.
