= Levente Gyöngyösi =

Romanian-born Hungarian composer (born 1975)

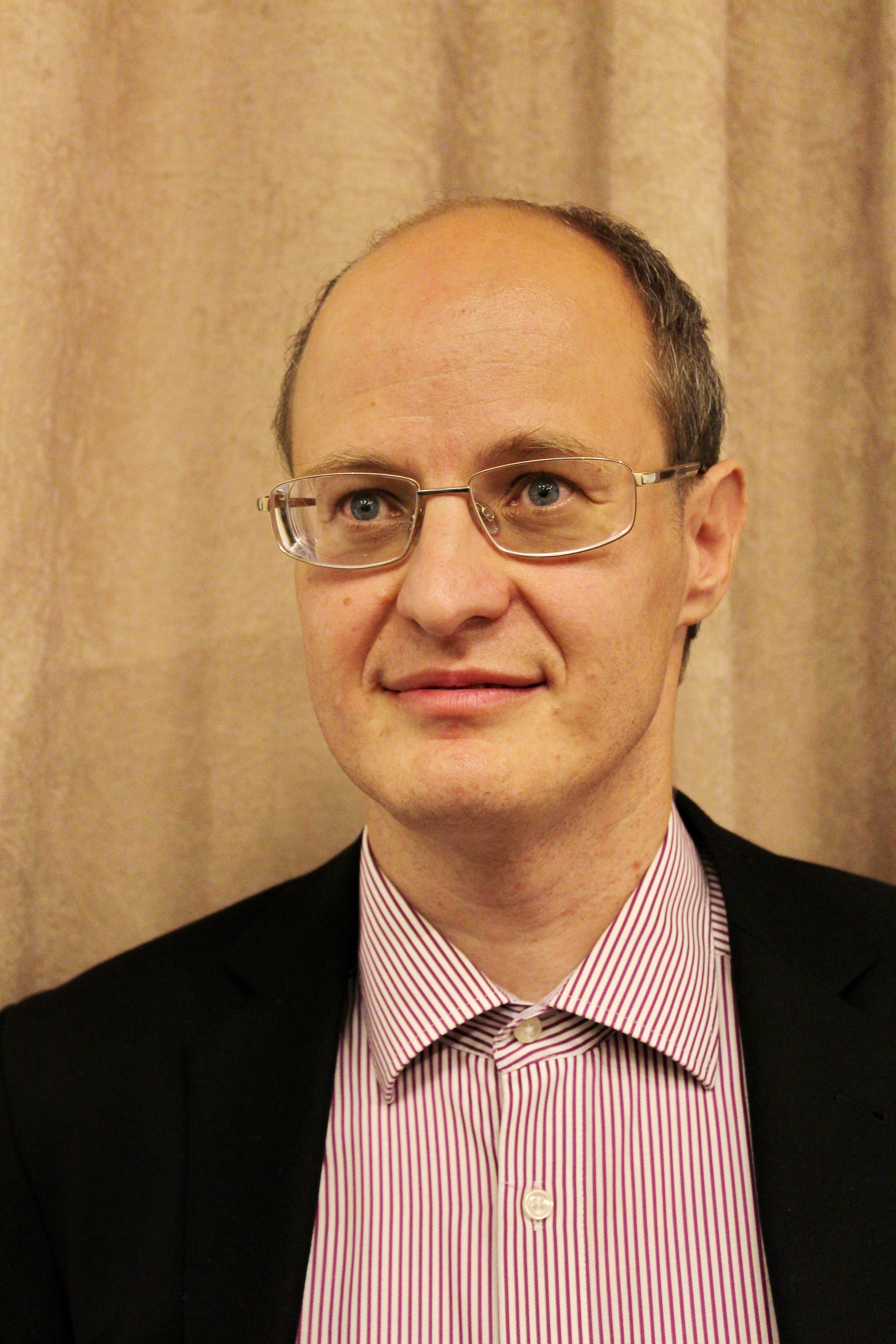
- Image: László Horváth

Background information
- Born: 1975 (age 50–51); Cluj-Napoca, Romania
- Occupations: Composer, Film composer

Levente Gyöngyösi (pronounced [ˈlɛvɛntɛ 'ɟønɟøʃi], born 1975, Cluj-Napoca, Romania) is a Romanian-born Hungarian composer. He moved to Hungary in 1989, when he was 14.

== Works, editions and recordings ==
- Opera A gólyakalifa (The Stork Caliph) after the novel of Mihály Babits. Hungarian State Opera, May 2005.
- Assumpta est Maria for mixed choirs
- Két keserû népdal ("two bitter folksongs") for mixed choir
- Salve Regina for soprano solo, female choir and two instruments
- Vanitatum vanitas for female chorus (2001)
- Missa Lux et Origo for female choirs (2004)
- Verkündigung ("Annunciation"), symphonic cycle in five movements (2003)
- oratorio Canticle of the Sun, Budapest Spring Festival (2004)
- Te lucis ante terminum
- Confitemini Domino for female choirs
- Dixit in corde suo for mixed choir and drum (2012)
- Concerto for Piccolo and Orchestra. Composed for, premiered, and recorded by Peter Verhoyen (2022)
- He also wrote 4 symphonies – the 3rd Symphony with soprano solo is named Birth; the 4th Symphony is named Az Illés szekerén ("On Elijah's Chariot", after a poem by Endre Ady) – and a Sinfonia Concertante for percussion group and orchestra.
