= János Vajda (composer) =

Hungarian composer (born 1949)

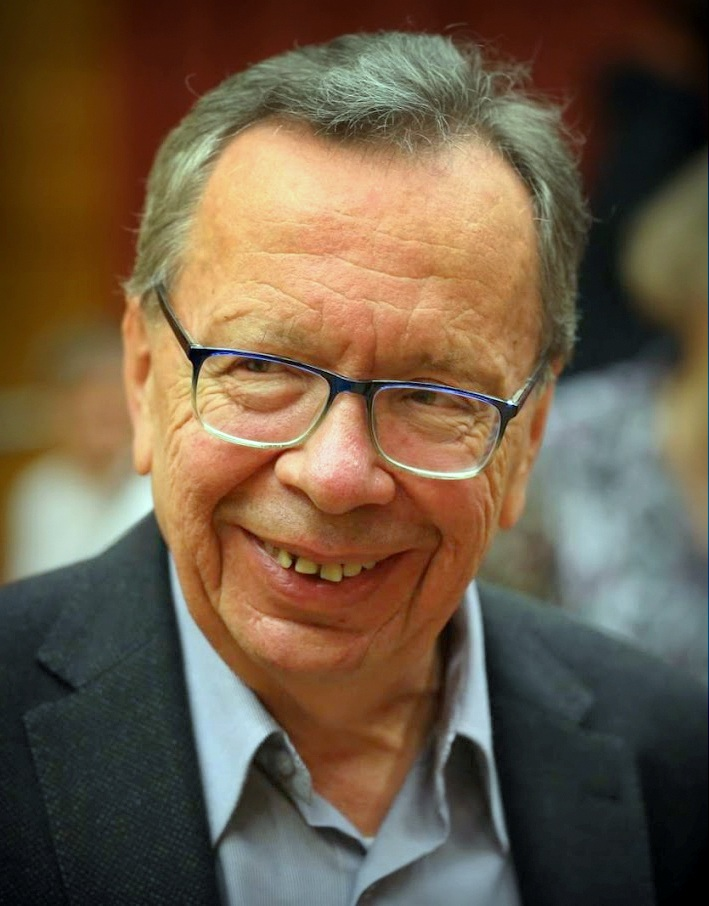

János Vajda (Hungarian pronunciation: [ˈvɒjdɒ ˈjaːnoʃ]; born 8 October 1949, in Miskolc) is a Hungarian composer.

== Works, editions, recordings ==
Operas

- Barabás (1977), opera after Frigyes Karinthy
- Márió és a varázsló (1988), after Thomas Mann's Mario and the Magician (1929)
- Leonce és Léna (1999), opera after Georg Büchner's Leonce and Lena (1836/1895), libretto: Szabolcs Várady
- Karnyóné (2004), opera after Mihály Csokonai Vitéz, libretto: Szabolcs Várady
- The Imaginary Invalid or the Cabal of Hypocrites (2021), opera after Molière (The Imaginary Invalid (1673)) and Mikhail Bulgakov (The Cabal of Hypocrites (1936)), libretto: Szabolcs Várady

Recordings

- Songs – Orbán Spanish songs. Songs to words by Sándor Weöres. János Vajda, Songs to words by Géza Szöcs: Andrea Meláth (mezzo-soprano), Emese Virág (piano). HCD31827 Hungaroton
- Missa in A, Orban: Missa prima HCD31929 Hungaroton
