= György Selmeczi =

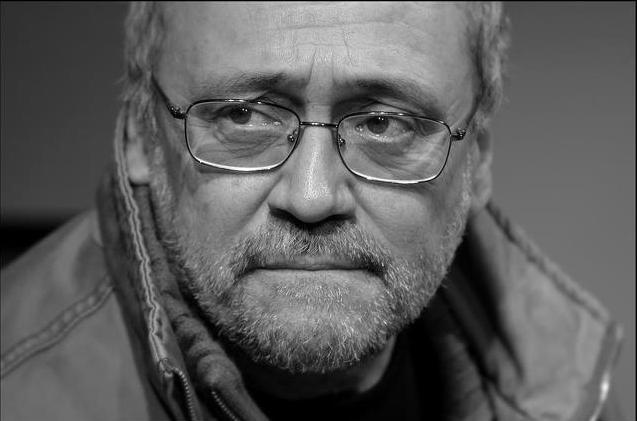

Background information
- Born: March 8, 1952 (age 73); Cluj, Romania
- Genres: film score; opera; contemporary classical
- Occupation(s): Composer, conductor, opera director, pianist
- Years active: 1976–present
- Website: selmeczi.hu

György Selmeczi (born March 8, 1952) is a Hungarian composer, conductor, opera director, and pianist.

== Biography ==
György Selmeczi was born in 1952 in Cluj, Romania, to Dr. János Selmecz, conductor of the Cluj Hungarian Opera, and Marcella Lokodi, a music teacher, into an ethnic Hungarian family. He emigrated to Hungary in 1976.

== Works, editions and recordings ==
- Spiritiszták (opera) - The Spiritists
- A Szirén (opera) - The Siren
- A függő város - The Suspending City
- Bizánc (opera) - Byzantium
