= Erzsébet Szőnyi =

Hungarian composer and music teacher (1924–2019)

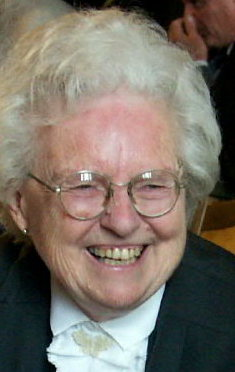
Erzsébet Szőnyi (2004)

Erzsébet Szőnyi (25 April 1924 – 28 December 2019), also Erzsébet Szilágyi, was a Hungarian composer and music teacher. Her works encompass symphonic compositions, chamber music works, art songs, and oratorios. She also wrote numerous stage works including eight operas.

== Biography ==
Born in Budapest on 25 April 1924, Erzsébet Szőnyi studied composition and piano at the Franz Liszt Academy of Music in Budapest with János Viski. She received a secondary school music teaching diploma. In Paris, she attended courses by Tony Aubin and Olivier Messiaen at the Conservatoire de Paris, obtained a prize for composition, and worked in private with Nadia Boulanger in 1947 and 1948. She was also a pupil of Zoltán Kodály, with whom she worked in close collaboration. Later, she taught at the Franz Liszt Academy of Music, providing classes in musical education and directing choirs. From 1964 onwards, Szőnyi was a member directing the International Society for Music Education (ISME). She was vice-president of ISME from 1970 to 1974. She died on 28 December 2019 in Budapest.

== Prizes ==
- 1947: Liszt-Preis
- 1959: Erkel Ferenc-díj
- 1995 and 2004: Bartók-Pásztory prize (Bartók Béla-Pásztory Ditta-díj)
- 2001: Kodály-Preis 2001.
- 2003: Kossuth Prize

Szőnyi had an honorary doctorate from Duquesne University in Pittsburgh. Since 1992 she was a member of the Széchenyi Academy of Arts ("Széchenyi Irodalmi és Művészeti Akadémia").

== Principal works ==
Piano:

- Little Chamber Music, for piano 4 mains (1950)
- La Princesse récalcitrante, suite for piano (1956)
- Toccatina, for piano (1965)

Organ:

- 6 pieces (1957)
- Concerto for organ (1958)
- Introduction, passacaille and fugue (1964)
- 5 Preludes (1965)

Chamber music:

- Serenade and danse, for violin and piano (1954)
- Sonatine, for violin and piano (1965)
- Duo, for violin and alto (1955)

Orchestral:

- Parlando and giusto (1947)
- Divertimento (1951)
- Intermezzo (1955)
- Musica festiva, suite (1965)

Vocal music:

- Songs, choral works, and oratorios

Operas:

- Dalma (1952)
- A makrancos királylány (1955)
- Firenzei tragédie (1957)
- Az aranyszárnyú méhecske (1974)
- A Gay Lament (1979)
- The Truth-telling Shepherd (1979)
- Break of Transmission (1980)
- Elfrida (1985)

== Sources ==
- Marc Honegger, Dictionnaire de la musique. Vol. 2, Les hommes et leurs œuvres, Bordas, p. 1224
- Werks of Erzsébet Szőnyi listed in the Catalogue of the Deutschen Nationalbibliothek
- Curriculum vitae of Erzsébet Szönyi at klassika.info
