= Mircea Diaconescu =

Romanian composer based in Germany

Mircea Valeriu Diaconescu (born 1929) is a Romanian composer based in Germany. He is working on a project for a Romanian psalter based on the model of Clément Marot and Théodore de Bèze.

== Works, editions and recordings ==
- Diaconescu: Lumina Lina on Ex Oriente Lux Bárdos, Eben, Gretchaninov, Karai, Nystedt, Orbán, Pärt, Penderecki, Popovici, Rachmaninov, Sisask, Tchaikovsky. Carmina Mundi Aachen, Harald Nickoll
