= Hungarian State Opera =

Opera house in Budapest, Hungary

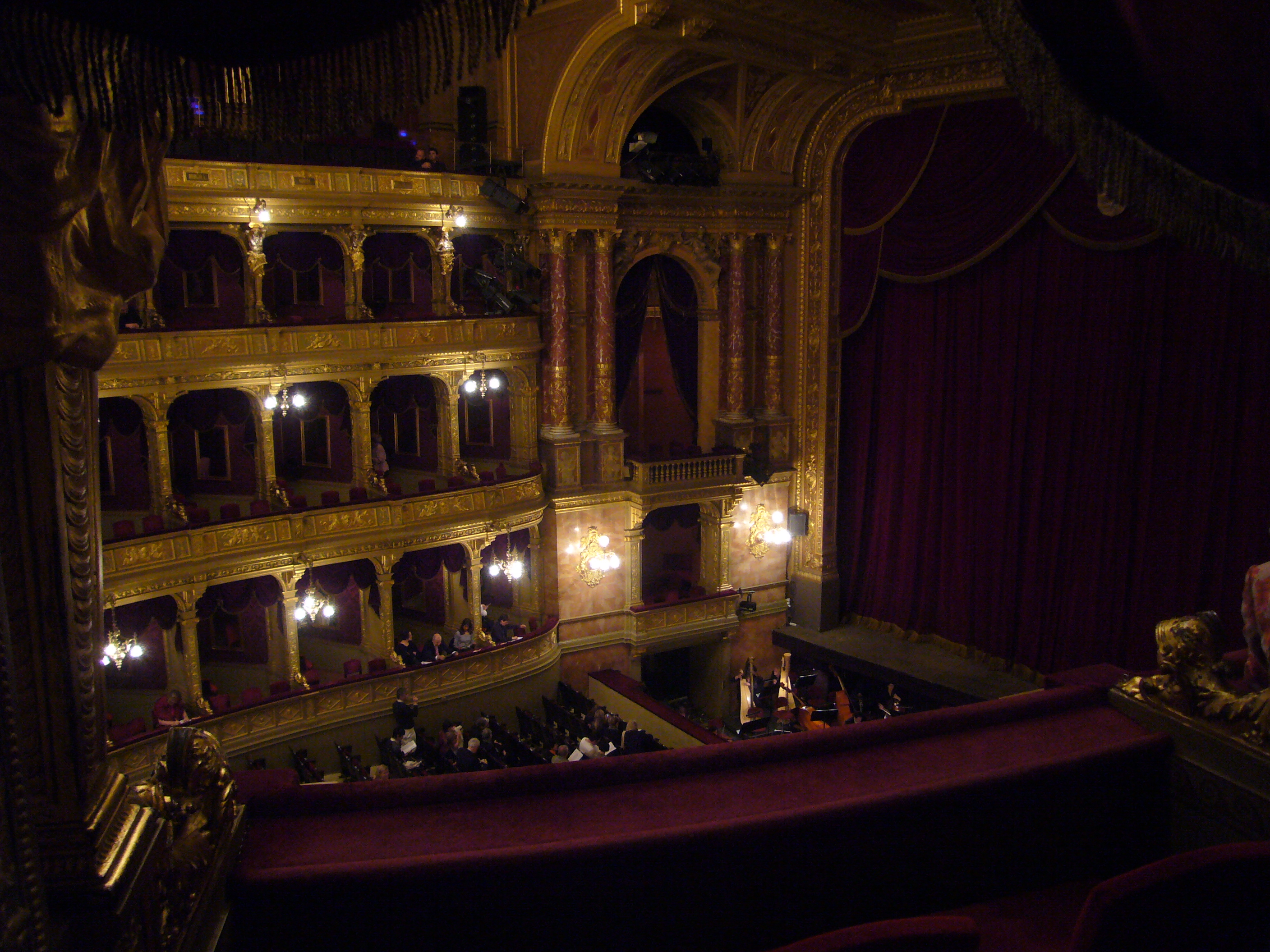
Hungarian State Opera House

The Hungarian State Opera is the national opera company of Hungary. Located in Budapest, it is a busy institution, with over 200 operas each calendar year, on top of extensive educational programs, ballet, and musical theatre. The company employs 150 singers, a 200-member orchestra, and a 200-member chorus. Performances take place in the Hungarian State Opera House and the Erkel Theatre.

In recent years, the company has also courted controversy, both in choices of casting, and in succumbing to public pressure to end scheduled productions early.

The year 2024 marked the 140th anniversary of its opening. In the same year, they announced the expansion of the “Opera Digitár” database which allows for the search of 60,000 performances, and the careers of more than 7,000 artists over the previous 139 seasons.

== History ==
=== Origin ===
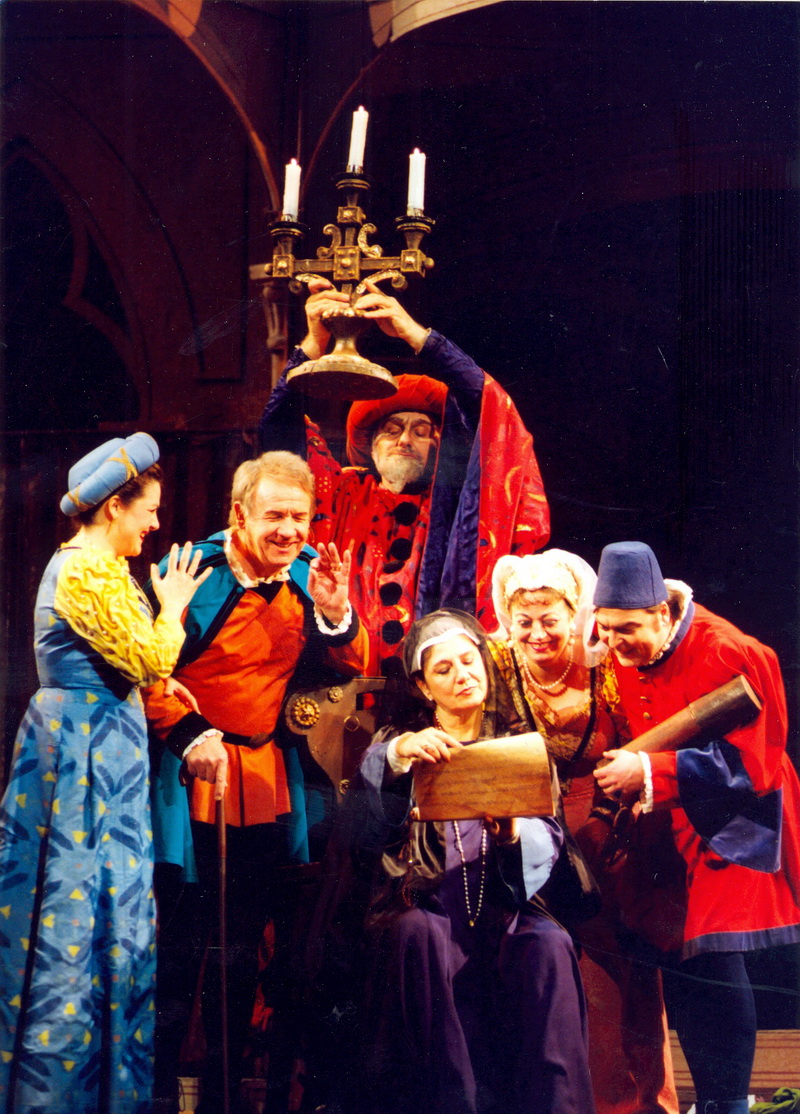
Gianni Schicchi (Hungarian State Opera House)

The Hungarian State Opera, or the Royal Hungarian Opera, as it was known until 1945, was founded in 1884 in Budapest. Its first director was Hungarian conductor and composer Ferenc Erkel, whose name now graces the second performance space that the company occupies.

The first performance of the company included the first act of Bánk bán by Erkel (considered to be an important, patriotic Hungarian opera), and the first act of Richard Wagner's Lohengrin.

From the beginning, the Hungarian State Opera was a large institution, initially employing a total of 475 people, including performers, orchestra players, and varying administrative staff. The Opera House itself, however, was undersized in terms of the number of seats, leading to a shortfall in operating income within the first few years of the company's existence. The shortfall was made up by a significant annual gift from the King. It is suggested that this gift led to the government having an outsized say in all matters related to company operations. Early audiences were made up of the aristocracy and other elites, who did not require excellence of the art on stage. Rather, it was considered a social club.

=== Gustav Mahler ===
In 1888, only four years after the company's founding, a 28-year-old Gustav Mahler became artistic director, at a time when the company was on shaky ground, financially, having laid off a quarter of its staff. It seemed an unlikely choice for a Hungarian company, being that Mahler was German, Jewish, with very little experience. Despite this, two of the purported goals under Mahler's leadership was to both make the company a national voice of Hungary, and also to eventually create a homegrown ensemble of Hungarian singers. Mahler did not complete these objectives in the two years he led the company. However, his short stint still led to the first period of acknowledged artistic excellence for the company. Further, it is acknowledged that Mahler's work in Budapest laid the groundwork for his best known post, that of leading the Vienna State Opera.

=== Bluebeard's Castle ===
Béla Bartók's Bluebeard's Castle is his most famous opera work. Initially entered into a Hungarian opera writing competition in 1911, it failed to gain popularity with the Hungarian music public. It is suggested that this is because its musical qualities were significantly different from the Italian and German opera that was at the center of Hungarian tastes, at the time. Nevertheless, Bluebeard's Castle eventually had its world premiere with the Hungarian State Opera Company in 1918, only to have the work banned in 1919 until the late 1930s, because of the forced exile of librettist Béla Balázs.

=== Modern day ===
The opera company today is guided under the leadership of Szilveszter Ókovács, who was appointed by Hungarian Prime Minister Viktor Orbán. The company has enjoyed significant investment from the Hungarian government in recent years, in the amount of hundreds of millions of dollars, including funds to renovate the Opera House for the first time since World War I. There has been much comparison drawn between the far right political leadership of Orban and Donald Trump in the United States, but one significant difference has been each of their approaches to governmental funding to cultural institutions. Whereas Trump attempted to significantly cut funding to the National Endowment for the Arts, Orban has both increased funding to cultural institutions, and also put in place handpicked leaders of those very institutions.

== Controversies ==
In recent years, there have been at least two instances of controversy surrounding productions of the Hungarian State Opera: a production of the musical Billy Elliott that was cut short, and shortly thereafter, an all-white casting of Porgy and Bess.

=== Billy Elliott ===
In June 2018, 15 performances of Billy Elliott were cancelled after a right-wing, pro-Orban website published an op-ed that Billy Elliot was targeting young people, and pushing pro-homosexual propaganda. The op-ed was promptly picked up by other right wing media members, and a short while later the performances were cancelled. The opera company, however, claimed the cancellations were caused by a drop in ticket sales caused by the negative publicity, not the publicity itself.

=== Porgy and Bess ===
Later in 2018, Hungarian State Opera generated controversy by the announcement of a mostly all-white production of Porgy and Bess, composed by George Gershwin. Porgy and Bess has been traditionally performed by an all-black ensemble, as its writers intended. Their production moved the story from Catfish Row in Charleston, South Carolina, to an airplane hangar, reframing it as a story about refugees. In order to perform the opera in the manner they did, Hungarian State Opera, as part of the agreement with Tams-Witmark, the licensor of the work, had to print "unauthorised [and] contrary to the requirements for the presentation of the work' on all of its marketing materials.

Some cultural critics saw the staging as part of an effort to drum up support for Viktor Orban, with the next Hungarian general election upcoming. Ádám Fischer, a prominent Hungarian conductor, described the production as being done in bad faith and political in its intent: "It's part of the whole election campaign against what they see as the double standards of the west and to allow them to say the west is racist and we are better than the west. Why else would Hungarian state opera stage a production of Porgy and Bess two months before the election?"

In opposition to these remarks, opera company director Ókovács said that the rumor that Viktor Orban was somehow connected to the production was false, and that he had not seen it. He described the controversy thusly: "There was really silly fake news about our Porgy production." While the production drew anger from foreign critics, Hungarian critics largely praised the work. An Orban-friendly website, Origo, said: "Only blacks used to be able to perform this opera because of racist restrictions." Another conservative columnist: "Political correctness is slowly devouring aesthetics."

Not all foreign critics saw the idea of a non-black Porgy and Bess as inherently bad. Years before the Hungarian production, Anthony Tommasini argued in The New York Times that opera has never been concerned with appearance to suggest authenticity - he notes that people were accepting of Luciano Pavarotti as a starving French artist. He goes on to quote African-American opera singer Simon Estes, who said, "This may sound extreme, but I think it's almost unconstitutional for Porgy and Bess to be performed only by black artists." He notes many casting choices where race was not part of the consideration. If what he calls "nontraditional casting" is going to be used at all, it has to be applied to all operas, even one with the specific kind of stipulations attached to it as Porgy and Bess has.

The Hungarian State Opera did Porgy and Bess for nearly 150 performances in the 1970s with a mostly white cast, performing in blackface.
