= Artúr Harmat =

Hungarian composer

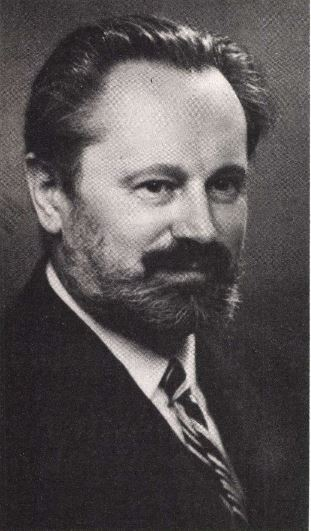
- Born: 27 June 1885; Bojná, Hungary
- Died: 26 April 1962 (aged 76); Budapest, Hungary
- Occupation: Composer

Artúr Harmat (27 June 1885 in Bojná – 26 April 1962 in Budapest) was a Hungarian composer. He was a student of Ferenc Kersch.

== Works, editions and recordings ==
- De Profundis on Musica Sacra Hungarica Budapest Monteverdi Choir, Eva Kollar
