= Miklós Kocsár =

Hungarian composer (1933–2019)

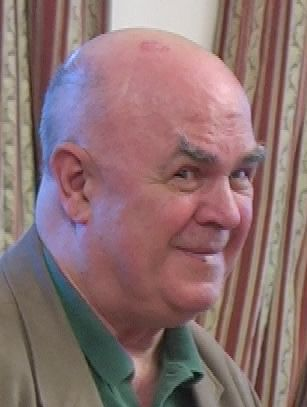
Miklós Kocsár in 2004

Miklós Kocsár (21 December 1933 – 29 August 2019) was a Hungarian composer.

== Biography ==
He was born in Debrecen, Hungary, (son of László Kocsár and Erzsébet Borsy) and studied composition at the Academy of Music in Budapest with Ferenc Farkas, graduating in 1959. After completing his studies, he took a position in 1972 as Professor at the Béla Bartók Conservatory in Budapest, teaching theory and composition.

From 1974–95, he worked in Hungarian Radio. In 1973 he won the Erkel Prize.

== Selected works ==
- Duó-Szerenád (Duo Serenade) for violin and viola (1955)
- String Quartet (1960)
- Szonáta szólóhegedűre (Sonata) for violin solo (1961–1991)
- Hét változat mélyhegedűre (7 Variations) for viola solo (1983)
- Concerto lirico for viola and orchestra (2000)

== Discography ==
Kocsár's works have been recorded an issued on media including:

- Miklós Kocsár: Choral Works Label: Hungaroton
- Miklós Kocsár: Concerto in memoriam Z.H. Label: Hungaroton
- Miklós Kocsár: Repliche Nos. 1–3 / Music of the Seasons / Songs on Poems by Lajos Kassak Label: Hungaroton
- Miklós Kocsár: Echos Nos. 1–4 / Hollos: Ciklus / Buyanovski: 4 Improvisations for horn solo Label: Hungaroton
- Horusitzky / Sugar, R. / Kosa / Balassa / Kocsar: Hungarian Contemporary Songs Label: Hungaroton
- Soproni / Farkas / Kocsar / Togobickij / Vajda: Violin Sonatas and Duets Label: Hungaroton
- Choral Works from the End of the Millennium Label: Hungaroton
- Hungarian Contemporary Works for Flute Duet Label: Hungaroton
- Jereb: Monography / Szekely: Rhapsody / Farkas, F.: Bucinata / Kocsar: Rhapsody / Victor: Viatrone Label: Hungaroton
- Hungarian Contemporary Choral Works Label: Hungaroton
- Choral Music Label: Hungaroton
- Hungarian Contemporary Choral Anthology Label: Hungaroton
- Cimbalom Music Label: Hungaroton
- Miklós Kocsár: Repliche No. 2 Label: Hungaroton

Kocsár has composed for film soundtracks including:

- Csodakarikás (TV movie), 1987
- Csontváry, 1980
- Napraforgó, 1974
- Az óriás, 1960
