= Leonardo García Alarcón =

Argentinian conductor

Leonardo García-Alarcón (born 5 August 1976 in La Plata) is an Argentinian conductor specializing in baroque music.

He studied harpsichord and organ and was assistant to Gabriel Garrido for several years, before founding the ensemble Cappella Mediterranea, with whom he has performed at many festivals, particularly the Festival d'Ambronay. Following a performance of Il diluvio universale by Michelangelo Falvetti (1642–1692), he received the médaille de citoyen d'honneur d'Ambronay. He teaches at the Geneva Conservatoire and carries out research into 17th century basso continuo playing.

He shares direction of the Ensemble Clematis with violinist Stéphanie de Failly. Since 2010 he is artistic director of the Chœur de chambre de Namur, and La Nouvelle Ménestrandie.

== Discography ==
- Mateo Romero - Romerico Florido Ensemble Clematis & Cappella Mediterranea, Leonardo García-Alarcón Ricercar - RIC308 2010
- Purcell - Dido and Aeneas La Nouvelle Ménestrandie & Cappella Mediterranea, Leonardo García-Alarcón Ambronay - AMY022
- Barbara Strozzi - Virtuosissima Compositrice Madrigals 1644 Cappella Mediterranea, Leonarda García-Alarcón - madrigals by Barbara Strozzi, Isabella Leonarda and Antonia Bembo. Ambronay - AMY020
- Frescobaldi - Il Regno d’Amore Ensemble Clematis, Leonardo García-Alarcón Ricercar - RIC300
- Handel - Judas Maccabaeus, HWV 63 recorded in the abbatial church of Ambronay, at the Ambronay Festival. Choeur de Chambre de Namur & Ensemble Les Agrémens, Leonardo García-Alarcón Ambronay - AMY024
- Farina - Capriccio Stravagante & Sonate. Stéphanie de Failly (violin) Ensemble Clematis, Leonardo García-Alarcón Ricercar - RIC285
- Peter Philips, Motets & Madrigals. Cappella Mediterranea, Leonardo García-Alarcón Ambronay - AMY015
- Antonio de Salazar, Felipe Madre de Deus - Maestros Andaluces en Nueva Espana Cappella Mediterranea, Leonardo García-Alarcón. Almaviva 2004
- Carolus Hacquart - Cantiones & Sonate Ensemble Clematis, Céline Scheen, soprano, Stephan Van Dyck, tenor, Dirk Snellings, bass. Leonardo García-Alarcón and Stéphanie de Failly, direction
- J. S. Bach, secular cantatas BWV 201 and BWV 205
- Giovanni Giorgi (d. 1762) Ave Maria
- Giuseppe Zamponi Ulisse nell' Isola de Circé (Brussels 1650)
- Michelangelo Falvetti – Nabucco (1683 oratorio), Alarcón, Cappella Mediterranea, Namur Chamber Choir
