= Giuseppe Zamponi =

Italian composer

Giuseppe Zamponi also Gioseffo Zamponi (or Zamboni, Samponi, c. 1615 – February 1662) was an Italian composer best remembered for his opera Ulisse all'isola di Circe performed in Brussels in 1650, which was the first opera performed in the Low Countries, at the time part of the Spanish ruled Southern Netherlands.

Zamponi was born in Rome, and was the organist at Nostra Signora del Sacro Cuore, then known as San Giacomo degli Spagnoli, in Rome's Piazza Navona, from 1629 to 1638, substituting for Paolo Tarditi (c.1580-1661). From 1638 to 1647 he was in the service of cardinal Pietro Maria Borghese (1599-1642). In 1648 he left Italy to join the court in Brussels of Archduke Leopold Wilhelm of Austria, who was governor of the Southern Netherlands on behalf of the King of Spain. He was appointed maestro di cappella in 1648, and died in 1662Brussels.

Ulisse all'isola di Circe was performed on 24 February 1650 in celebration of the October 1649 wedding of Philip IV of Spain and Mariana of Austria. It was staged again in 1655 at the occasion of the visit of Queen Christina from Sweden.

== Works, editions and recordings ==
- Dies irae per 5 voci e 3 strumenti
- Sonata per violino, viola da gamba e basso continuo
- Sonata per violino, viola e basso continuo
- Sonata per 2 violini e basso continuo
- Capriccio
- 2 arie
- Opera Ulisse all'isola di Circe. - Recording Leonardo García Alarcón 2012
