= Ambronay Festival =

Coordinates: 46.0064°N 5.3611°E

The Ambronay Festival is a French opera festival and early music festival.

The festival has been running in October for 30 years and previously produced recordings with labels such as the Auvidis label. 7 of 14 early recordings were with Jordi Savall. Since 2005, the Festival has been issuing recordings on its own label, Ambronay Éditions. More recently Leonardo García-Alarcón has been a regular performer and recording artist.

The main venue is the Benedictine Abbey Notre-Dame d'Ambronay of the village of Ambronay. The abbey has an exceptional acoustic. In the abbey performing spaces are: Tour Dauphine, Chapiteau, Abbatiale. Other venues include the Théâtre de Bourg-en-Bresse, Monastery of Brou, also at Bourg-en-Bresse, Théâtre des Augustins in Montluel, the Abbaye Saint-Martin d'Ainay, Lyon, and Belley Cathedral.

== Themes ==
There is a theme for the festival each year:

- 2005 - including premieres of works by Francisco António de Almeida and Pedro António Avondano Ensemble Divino Sospiro, dir. Enrico Onofri. Tonos, cantadas et xácaras du Baroque espagnol by Los Músicos de Su Alteza dir. Luis Antonio González
- 2006 - including Marco Marazzoli La Vita Humana Le Poème Harmonique dir. Vincent Dumestre.
- 2007 - including Robert Carver, Ludus Modalis, dir. Bruno Boterf
- 2008 - Women composers - including works by Johann Adolf Hasse, Akadêmia dir. Françoise Lasserre
- 2009 - celebrated 30 years by inviting the founders of the baroque movement. Including William Christie directing Handel's Susanna.
- 2010 - celebrated the younger generation: Marco Mencoboni and Cantar Lontano, Fabio Biondi, Manfredo Kraemer, Jean-Christophe Spinosi, and those still younger such as Geoffroy Jourdain and the Les Cris de Paris, Héloïse Gaillard and Ensemble Amarillis, Emmanuel Bardon and Canticum Novum, Sébastien d'Hérin (harpsichordist) and Leonardo García-Alarcón.
- 2011 - Passion Bach, with the Mass in B Minor conducted by Sigiswald Kuijken - and also Italian baroque; Caldara by Philippe Jaroussky, Vivaldi by Max Emanuel Cenčić and Porpora by Vivica Genaux.

== Discography ==
Recordings issued under the festival's own label, Ambronay Éditions include:

- Hasse: Serpentes ignei in deserto. Ensemble: Les Paladins. Conductor: Jérôme Correas (2006)
- Rossi and Marazzoli: Soleils Baroques. Ensemble: Les Paladins. Conductor: Jérôme Correas (2008)
