= Giovanni Giorgi (composer) =

Italian composer

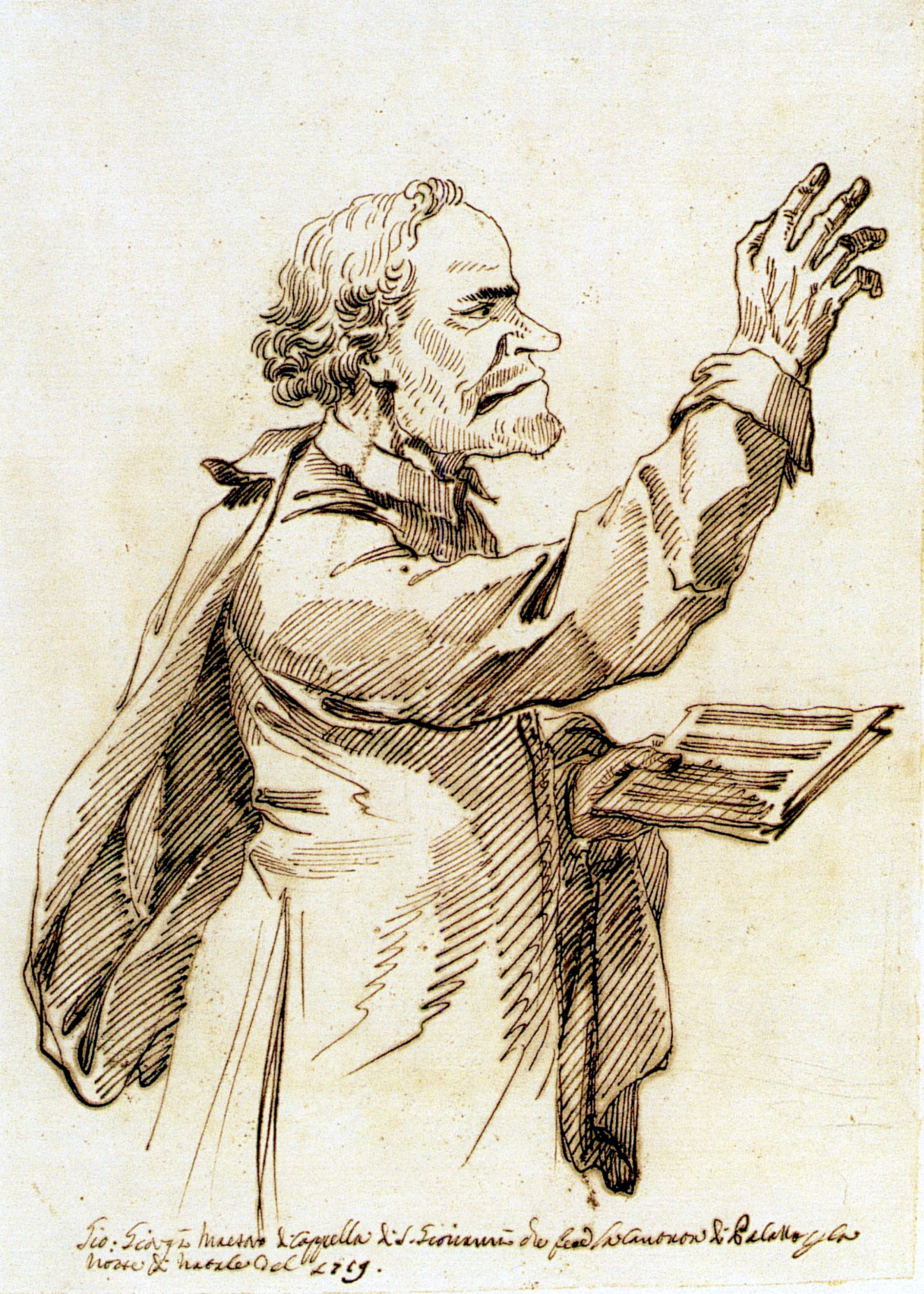
Giovanni Giorgi, caricature by Pier Leone Ghezzi, 1719

Giovanni Giorgi (late 17th or early 18th century – June 1762) (Latin: Joannis de Georgiis) was a priest and an Italian composer. His style of polychoral church compositions are influenced by earlier Roman School composers such as Orazio Benevoli, but also incorporate later Roman Baroque features and (after about 1758) some elements of early Classical style.

== Life ==
Giorgi is reputed to have originated from Venice, but few details of his life are known. In 1719, he was appointed maestro di cappella at the papal Basilica of St. John Lateran, Rome, and was the successor of Giuseppe Ottavio Pitoni. Many of Giorgi's early compositions were written during his time in Rome.

By January 1725, he was in Lisbon, where he took up the post of court mestre de capela. He died in Lisbon in 1762.

== Works ==
Many Portuguese records were lost in the 1755 Lisbon earthquake, but in Giorgi's case around 600 compositions have been preserved both in the Lateran archives in Rome and at Lisbon Cathedral. Most are vocal works and many are for liturgical use. Some—particularly the later works—incorporate concerted instrumental parts.

His extant works include:

- 162 motets, some for 2 to 4 voices; also some for 8 or 16 voices
- 33 mass settings for 2, 4, 8 and 16 voices; some with instrumental parts
- 145 gradual settings for 2, 4 and 8 voices; some with instruments
- 137 antiphons for 2 to 4 voices; some with instrumental parts
- 162 psalms for 4, 5 and 8 voices; some with organ parts
- 152 offertory settings for 8 voices; one with instruments
- 49 hymns for 4 voices
- 20 responsories for 4 or 8 voices
- Lamentations for 8 voices
- 5 cantatas for solo soprano and organ
- Madrigals for 5 voices

== Recordings ==
- Giovanni Giorgi: Motetos de Natal e Páscoa, Coro de Câmara da Universidade de Aveiro directed by Cristiana Spadaro. Published 2015 as MPMP / UA 1

Includes Motets n.º 24-27 and 48-52

- Giovanni Giorgi: Ave Maria, Choeur de Chambre de Namur, and Cappella Mediterranea directed by Leonardo García-Alarcón. Published June 2011 as Ricercar RIC 313.

The CD features eight works by Giorgi: Ave Maria (a 4); a mass setting, Messa a due Cori tutti piena, for the Capella Reale in Lisbon; and the offertory settings Angelus Domini descendit de cælo (a 8); Improperium expectavit cor meum (a 4); Dextera Domini (a 4); Tui sunt caeli (a 8); Ascendit Deus in jubilatione (a 8); and In omnem terram (a 8; in five sections).

- Roma Triumphans, Studio de musique ancienne de Montréal directed by Christopher Jackson. Published 2008 as Atma SACD 22507.

Includes three settings by Giorgi: Offertory Terra Tremuit and motets Haec Dies and Veni Sancte Spiritus. (Other pieces on this CD are by much earlier composers Marenzio, Victoria, Palestrina, Orazio Benevoli and Ugolini).
