= Saint-Rambert-en-Bugey station =

Railway station in Saint-Rambert-en-Bugey, France

Saint-Rambert-en-Bugey
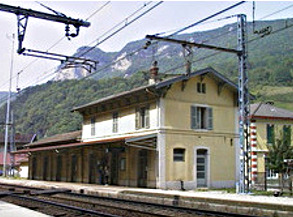

General information
- Location: Place des Anciens-Combattants, 01230 Saint-Rambert-en-Bugey, France
- Coordinates: 45°56′50″N 5°26′20″E
- Owner: SNCF
- Line: Lyon–Geneva railway
- Tracks: 2

Construction
- Parking: yes
- Cycle facilities: yes

Other information
- Station code: 87743740
- Website: Gare de Saint-Rambert-en-Bugey

History
- Opened: 7 May 1857; 169 years ago

Services
Preceding station	TER Auvergne-Rhône-Alpes	Following station
Ambérieu towards Lyon-Part-Dieu	35	Tenay-Hauteville towards Chambéry
Location

Saint-Rambert-en-Bugey station (French: Gare de Saint-Rambert-en-Bugey) is a railway station serving the town of Saint-Rambert-en-Bugey, in the Ain department in eastern France. It is situated on the Lyon–Geneva railway and served by TER Auvergne-Rhône-Alpes trains.

The station is located at the kilometric point (KP) 62.677 of the Lyon–Geneva railway, between Ambérieu and Tenay - Hauteville stations. It was brought into operation by the Compagnie du chemin de fer de Lyon à Genève on 7 May 1857. It is now owned by the SNCF.

The station has a bicycle parking area and a car park.

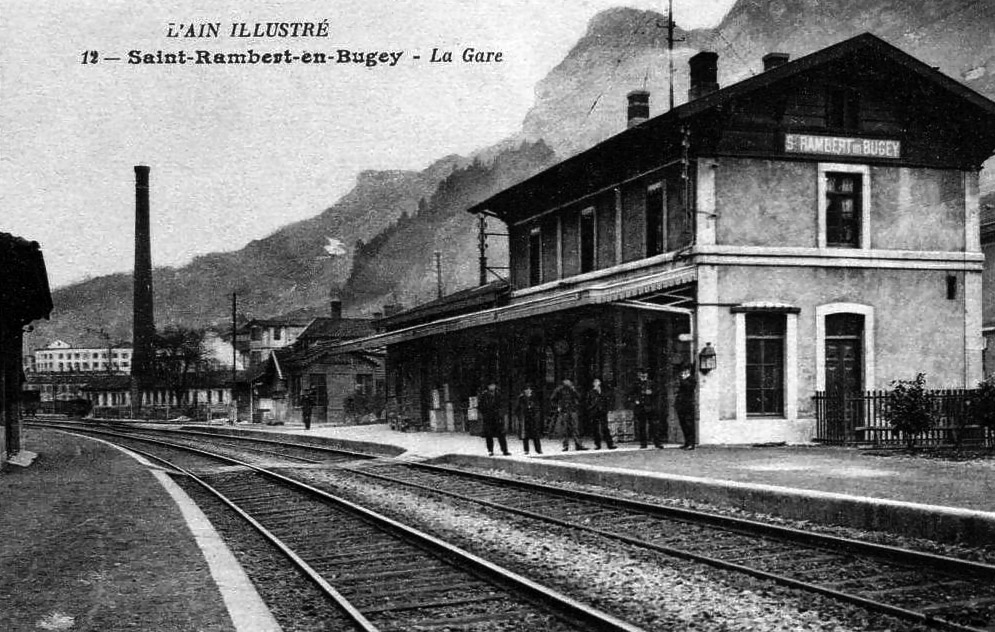
The station, ca. 1900

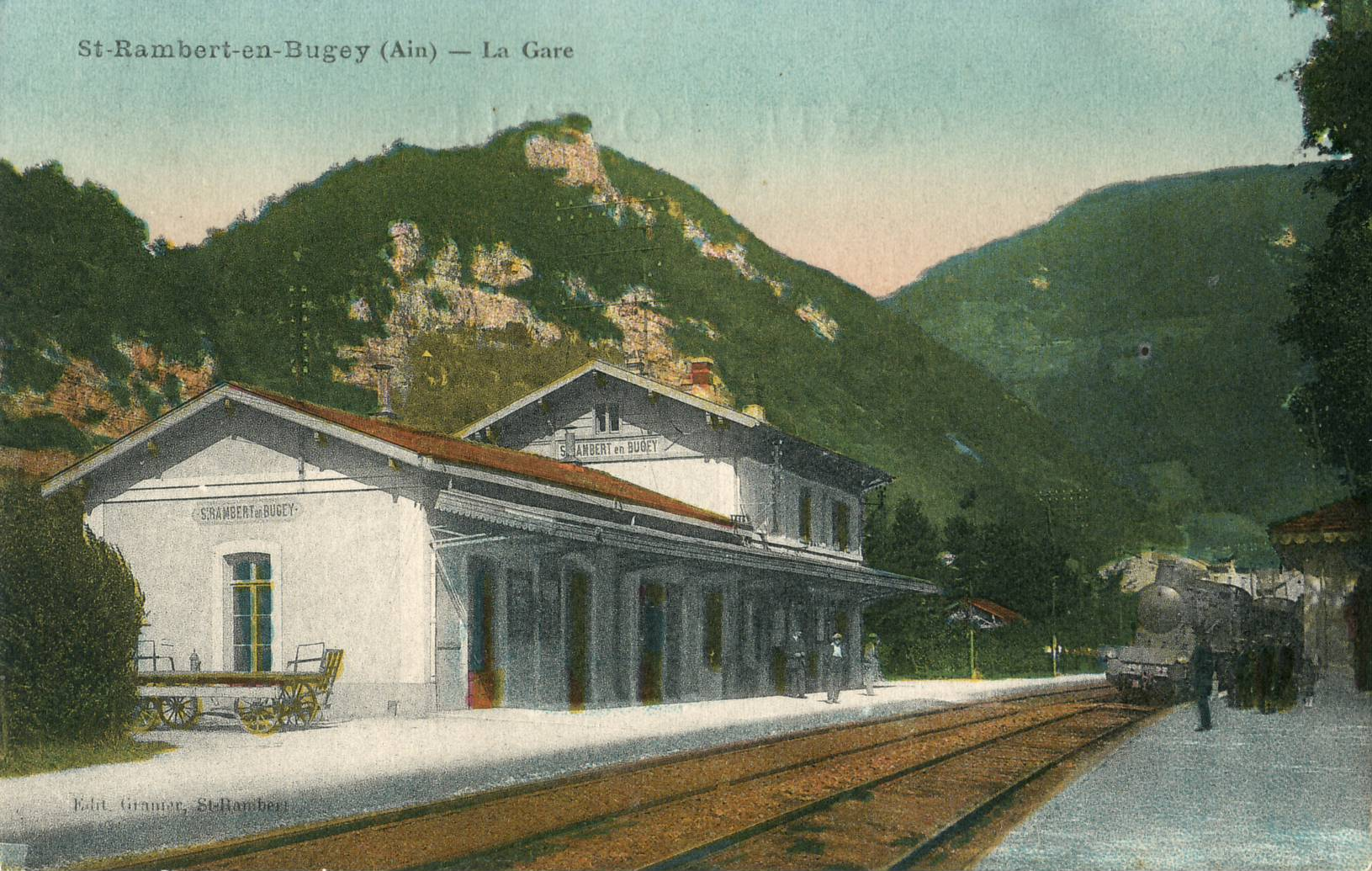
The station, ca. 1900

== See also ==
- List of SNCF stations in Auvergne-Rhône-Alpes
