= Filipe da Madre de Deus =

Portuguese composer

Frei Filipe da Madre de Deus (Lisbon, c. 1630 – Seville, c. 1688 or 1690) was a Portuguese Baroque composer.

== Life ==
Filipe da Madre de Deus was born in Lisbon, about 1630. Although he lacked a deep knowledge of music theory, he was a skilled composer and vihuelist at the court of Philip IV of Spain (Philip III of Portugal until 1640).

In 1654, John IV of Portugal heard about the notoriety of Madre de Deus and hired him for the Portuguese court. Two years later, John IV died and was succeeded by Afonso VI. Sometime between April 1660 and August 1661, Afonso VI nominated Madre de Deus as mestre da câmara de música real ("master of the royal chamber music").

In 1668, Peter II was appointed regent for Afonso VI, his insane brother, and all his former employees were taken off the royal payroll. Thus, Filipe da Madre de Deus had to return to Spain in 1668. He was succeeded by the renowned António Marques Lésbio as master of the royal chamber music of Portugal.

Madre de Deus retired to the monastery of the barefooted Mercedarians of San Laureano in Seville. He continued as chapel master of this monastery until at least 1688, the year of his last known work. He probably died there about 1688 or 1690.

== Works ==
Filipe da Madre de Deus composed mainly villancicos and tonos for several occasions and holidays, including an 18th-birthday salute to Afonso VI, Ostente aplausos festivos ("Ostentate joyous applause", 1661), and the famous negro villancico for Christmas, Antonya Flaciquia Gasipà. He also composed sacred choral works with continuo accompaniment.

== Recordings ==
The following recordings include works by Madre de Deus:

- 1994 - Canções, Vilancicos e Motetes Portugueses. Paul Van Nevel and Huelgas Ensemble. Sony Classical SK 66288. Track 12 "Antonya Flaciquia Gasipà".
- 2003 - Villancicos Y Danzas Criollas. Hespèrion XXI conducted by Jordi Savall. AV9834. Track 9 "Antonya Flaciquia Gasipà".
- 2004 - Maestros Andaluces en Nueva Espana. Cappella Mediterranea, Leonardo García-Alarcón. Almaviva 2004 - Track "Retire su valentia" instrumental.
- 2007 - Flores de Lisboa - Canções, vilancicos e romances portugueses. A Corte Musical and Rogério Gonçalves. Le Couvent K617195. Track 12 "Ostente aplausos festivos".
- 2008 - Vilancicos Negros do Século XVII. Coro Gulbenkian conducted by Jorge Matta. Portugaler 1016-2. Track 3 "Antonya, Flaciquia, Gasipà".
