= Meximieux–Pérouges station =

Railway station in Meximieux, France

Coordinates: 45°54′06″N 5°11′36″E

Meximieux–Pérouges
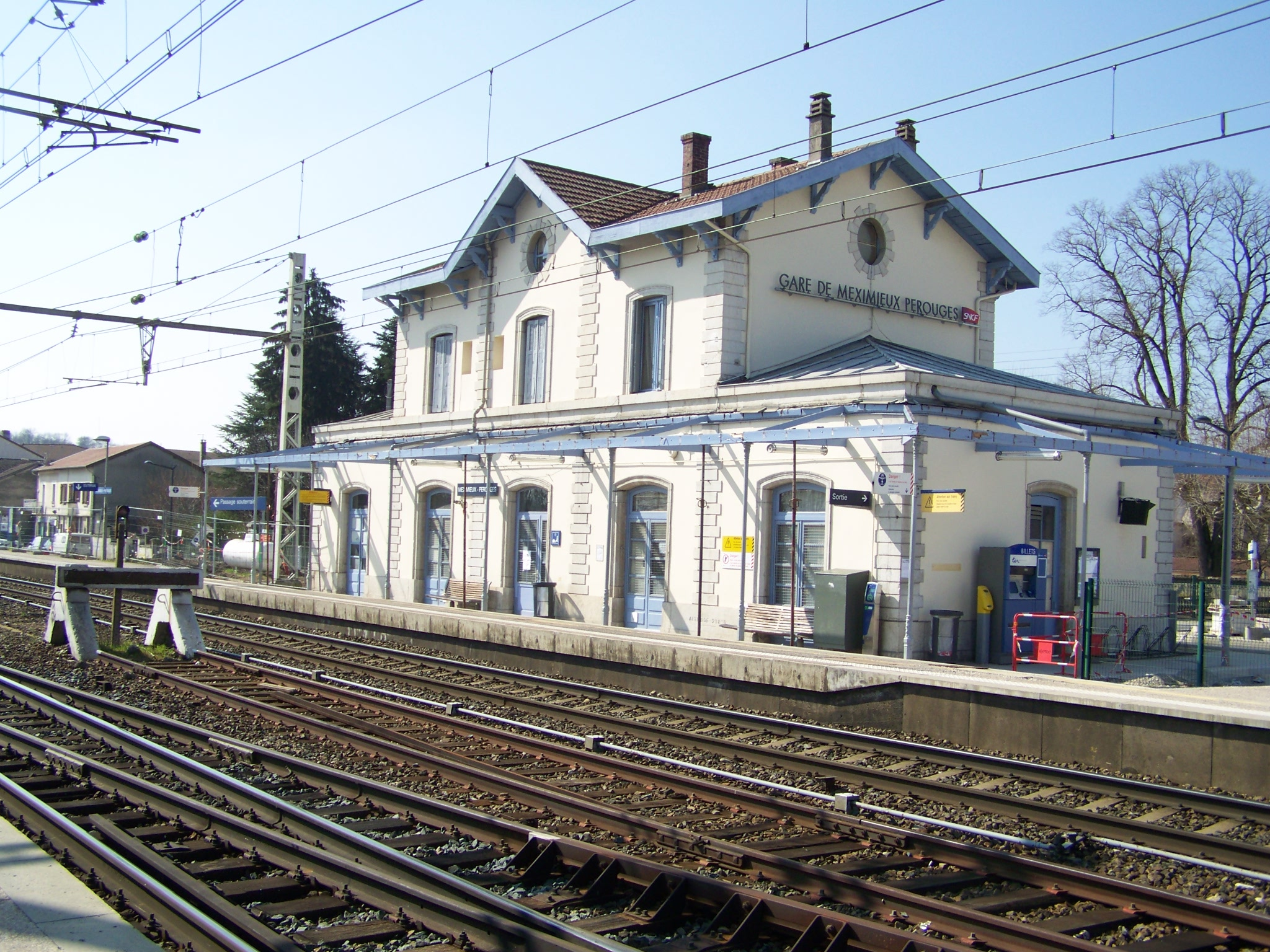
- View of the passenger building from opposing platform.

General information
- Location: 2 Avenue de Verdun; 01800 Meximieux; Ain; France
- Elevation: 218 m (715 ft)
- Owner: SNCF
- Operator: SNCF
- Line: Lyon–Geneva railway
- Distance: 38.393 km
- Platforms: 2
- Tracks: 2

Other information
- Fare zone: REAL
- Website: Station website

History
- Opened: 23 June 1856; 170 years ago

Passengers
- 2019: 719,403

Services
Preceding station	TER Auvergne-Rhône-Alpes	Following station
La Valbonne towards Lyon-Part-Dieu	35	Ambérieu towards Chambéry
Location

Meximieux–Pérouges station (French: Gare de Meximieux–Pérouges) is a railway station located in the commune of Meximieux, Ain department in the Auvergne-Rhône-Alpes region of France. As its name suggests the station is located within proximity of, and serves the nearby medieval era commune of Pérouges. It is located at kilometric point (KP) 38.393 on the Lyon–Geneva railway, between the stations of La Valbonne and Ambérieu-en-Bugey.

As of 2020, the station is owned and operated by the SNCF and served by TER Auvergne-Rhône-Alpes trains.

== History ==
The section of the Lyon—Geneva railway between Lyon and Ambérieu via Miribel was opened on 23 June 1856.

In 2019, the SNCF estimated that 719,403 passengers traveled through the station.

== Services ==
=== Passenger services ===
Owned and operated by the SNCF, the station is equipped with automatic ticket dispensing machines.

=== Train services ===
As of 2021, the station is served by the following services:

- Regional services (TER Auvergne-Rhône-Alpes 35) Chambéry ... Culoz ... Ambérieu ... Lyon.

=== Intermodality ===
In addition to a parking lot for passengers, the station is equipped with secure bicycle storage facilities.

== See also ==
- List of SNCF stations in Auvergne-Rhône-Alpes
