= Scylla et Glaucus =

1746 tragédie en musique by Jean-Marie Leclair

- Tragédie en musique by Jean-Marie Leclair
- Librettist: d'Albaret
- Language: French
- Based on: Metamorphoses by Ovid
- Premiere: 4 October 1746; Académie Royale de Musique, Paris, France

Scylla et Glaucus (Scylla and Glaucus) is a tragédie en musique with a prologue and five acts, the only surviving full-length opera by Jean-Marie Leclair. The French-language libretto by d'Albaret is based on Ovid's Metamorphoses, books 10, 13 and 14. It was first performed at the Académie Royale de Musique in Paris on 4 October 1746.

== Background ==
The quality of the vocal writing in Scylla et Glaucus came as a surprise to many, given that Leclair was much better known for composing instrumental music, and therefore had little experience in opera. By the time the Scylla was performed in 1746, Leclair was already known for his forty-eight violin sonatas, his trios, and his concertos. He received much of his musical training in Italy, where he was exposed to the influence of Pietro Locatelli and other Italian composers of the time. This is why the writing of Scylla, while remaining recognisably in French, is full of italianisms.

Leclair dedicated the work to Marie-Anne-Françoise de Noailles, Countess of La Mark (or La Marck), an accomplished musician who sang and played the harpsichord. Madame de La Mark often enjoyed having operas performed in her home. (Note: Marie-Anne-Françoise de Noailles (1719–1793), daughter of Françoise Charlotte d'Aubigné and Adrien Maurice de Noailles, 3rd Duke of Noailles)

== Roles ==
Roles, voice types, premiere cast
Role	Voice type	Premiere cast, 4 October 1746
Prologue
The chief of the peoples of Amathus	bass-baritone (basse-taille)	Person
A Propoetide	tenor (taille)	Louis-Antoine Cuvillier
Vénus	soprano	Mlle Romainville
L'Amour (Cupid)	soprano	Mlle Cazeau
Chorus: peoples of Amathus, Propoetides. Ballet: peoples d'Amathus
Tragédie (Acts 1–5)
Scylla, a nymph	soprano	Marie Fel
Témire, Scylla's confidante	soprano	Marie-Angélique Coupé (or Couppé)
Glaucus, a sea god	haute-contre	Pierre Jélyotte
Circé, a sorceress	soprano	Marie-Jeanne Fesch "Mlle Chevalier"
Dorine, Circé's confidante	soprano	Louise Jacquet
Licas, Glaucus's friend	bass-baritone	de La Mare (also spelled Lamare or Lamarre)
Divertissements
A shepherd, attracted to Scylla	haute-contre	Jean-Paul Spesoller called La Tour or Latour
A sylvan, attracted to Scylla	bass-baritone	Albert
A coriphée of Circé's followers	soprano	Mlle Cazeau
Hécate	taille	Albert
Chorus: shepherds and sylvans, attendants of Circe, sea gods, underworld gods, peoples of Sicily; Ballet: sylvans and shepherdesses (act 1); attendants of Circe, in pleasant shapes (act 2); sea gods (act 3); demons (act 4); peoples of Sicily (act 5)

== Synopsis ==
=== Prologue ===
A temple of Venus where the people of Amathus celebrate a festival in honour of the goddess, the laws to which even the dreaded Mars himself yields. The party is interrupted by Propoetides (the daughters of Propoetus from the city of Amathus on the island of Cyprus), who are jealous of the presence of Venus; they abhor religion and deny the divinity of the goddess. The goddess descends to punish them by way of petrification; "woe to those who despise the pleasures over which she presides". Through her son Amour, she promises happiness and prosperity to those who revere her.

=== Act 1 ===
The setting is Sicily. On one side, there is a forest, on the other, a vast countryside. The nymph Scylla is equally cold to all of her lovers, including Glaucus, a young prophetic sea-god in Neptune's court, born mortal and turned immortal upon eating a magical herb. It was believed that he commonly came to the rescue of sailors and fishermen in storms, having once been one himself. He is in love with Scylla, and led to despair by the hardness of Scylla's heart, goes to seek help from Circe, the sorceress.

=== Act 2 ===
Circe is in her palace, and she confesses that she cannot live without love. Inevitably, she goes mad with love for Glaucus when she first sees him. Glaucus asks for assistance in arousing Scylla, but it's for herself that Circe goes to work, devising a spell to make Glaucus fall in love with her instead. A lavish party follows, during which Circe's henchmen attempt to seduce Glaucus. The spell is successful; Glaucus falls at Circe's feet and Scylla is quickly forgotten. A close friend of Glaucus comes to inform him that Scylla complained of his absence, and Scylla's name proves to be enough to break the spell. Glaucus leaves hurriedly to go to his mistress, and Circe, furious, swears revenge.

=== Act 3 ===
The setting is the edge of the sea. Scylla realises that despite everything, she is in love with Glaucus. The lovers reunite, which leads, naturally, to a party. Glaucus calls upon all of the sea gods and urges them to sing his victory. The party is disturbed by Circe, who comes down to the scene in a cloud. She ends the act with an anger-filled monologue.

=== Act 4 ===
The setting is wild, with Mount Etna erupting in the background. Circe makes vain efforts to take back Glaucus. Scylla arrives at the scene, and her presence ignites the jealous wrath of Circe. Circe pretends to be softened by Glaucus's tears, but only to more surely destroy her rival. The moment the two lovers leave, she embarks upon magic incantations to take revenge on Scylla. The Moon descends from heaven, transforms into Hecate, and from out of the Underworld brings to Circe "the most deadly poison that the Phlegethon River has ever produced from its shores". It is the poison that will be the instrument of Circe's vengeance.

=== Act 5 ===
The setting is a place prepared for a party. Glaucus and Scylla exchange tender embraces as well as fears. The memory of Circe concerns Scylla, and Glaucus's only task becomes to reassure his lover. The people of Sicily come to celebrate the anniversary of the liberation of their country, which had for years been subject to the tyrannical empire of the Cyclops. Seeing the fountain Circe poisoned, Glaucus exclaims: "It is in this fountain that I saw your beautiful eyes the first time." Scylla looks into the fountain and the poison takes effect. Scylla succumbs to Circe's cruel revenge and runs into the sea. She dies and turns into a rock in the shape of a woman. Circe triumphs, and she finds satisfaction in Glaucus's misery.

== Arias ==
Setting	Situation	Scene/singer/solo aria	Main effect
Forest and landscape	After a divertissement intended as a tempting gift, Scylla rejects Glaucus	I.1: Scylla, "Non, je ne cesserai jamais" (monologue), D major.	Scylla will continue to avoid Love
Circe's palace	Without a current lover, Circe welcomes Glaucus, promising to help subdue Scylla's objections. But her own divertissement almost seduces him – Licas enters just in time. Circe is outraged.	II.2: Circe, "Circe, sensible" (en scéne with Glaucus), B-flat major, ABB' form. II.5: Circe, "Il me fuit, hélas" (en scéne with her ministers), D minor.	Circe's apparent sincerity in helping Glaucus; Circe's emotional desolation
Seashore	Scylla's emotions have been stirred. Glaucus convinces her of his love. Circe interrupts the celebrations. All flee, leaving her jealous and confused.	III.1: Scylla, "Serments trompeurs" (en scéne with her confidante), G minor. III.3: Scylla, "Ta gloire en ces lieux" (en scéne with all celebrants), E major.	Regret, mixed with ironic acceptance Acceptance of Love
Barren hillside with Mount Etna, shooting flames	Circe puts an ultimatum to Glaucus: he must love Circe only. Scylla's unexpected arrival intensifies his agony, yet he persuades Circe to free them. But later, Circe obtains poison from Hecate.	IV.1: Circe, "Reviens, ingrat" (en scéne with Glaucus), B major. IV. 4: Circe, "Noites devinities" (monologue), E-flat major, with fast 'B' section.	Fragile-sounding appeal for Glaucus' return Invocation to hellish gods
A place of pastoral celebration	Sicilians celebrate freedom from the Cyclops, joined by a happy Scylla and Glaucus. Scylla looks into her favorite fountain; it has been poisoned by Circe. Dying, she is watched by Circe from a flying dragon, and then metamorphosed into a rock surrounded by baying monsters.	V.2: Glaucus, ariette, "Chantez l'amour" (en scéne with Sicilians, who join in the recapitulation), F major.	Unsuspecting praise of love

== Performance history ==
Though the opera was not widely acclaimed, it had a successful eighteen-performance run. The first was on 4 October 1746, at the Académie royale de musique. After the eighth performance, a ballet-pantomime, a genre that was then very popular, was added at the end of the tragedy. It was called Un Jardinier et une Jardinière, or "A Gardener and a Planter". In 1747, Jean-Marie Leclair the Younger, brother of the composer, showed the opera at the Academy of Fine Arts in Lyon, directing the orchestra. It was performed in this same way in 1750 and in 1755.

=== Modern performances ===
- London – 14 November 1979 (First revival of the opera)
- Lyon – Opéra Nouvel – February 1986 (First revival in opera in France): Five performances with other performances at the Bath Festival and the Göttingen International Handel Festival
- Versailles – Opéra Royal, 27 and 29 September 2005
- Lyon – Auditorium, 1 December 2005
- Amsterdam – The Royal Concertgebouw, 3 December 2005
- Budapest – Béla Bartók National Concert Hall, 16 May 2013
- Kiel – Ballet Kiel, 6 May 2017

Scylla is not very widely known today and, for that reason, is rarely performed. Neal Zaslaw, an American musicologist, attributes its lack of revival to three specific aspects of the opera: Hecate's terrifying magic powers, a "thoroughly Baroque" musical style, and a tragic ending, viz. the petrification of the heroine and the desolation of the hero.

== Form ==
The opera is cast in the traditional tragédie en musique form developed by Jean-Baptiste Lully in the seventeenth century: a prologue followed by five acts. By the time Scylla's first performance was given, the form was already becoming outdated, threatened by both the newly evolving form of opéra-ballet and the increasingly popular Italian comic opera. However, while the form of the opera might have been old-fashioned, the music was not.

== Recordings ==
- Scylla et Glaucus, Marie McLaughlin (Scylla), Jean-Claude Orliac (Glaucus), Jennifer Smith (Circé), Monteverdi Choir and English Baroque Soloists conducted by John Eliot Gardiner — live in London, 1979, BBC public recording
- Scylla et Glaucus, Donna Brown (Scylla), Howard Crook (Glaucus), Rachel Yakar (Circé), Monteverdi Choir and English Baroque Soloists conducted by John Eliot Gardiner — studio recording, Church of St Giles, Cripplegate, 1–28 Feb 1986, Erato
- Scylla et Glaucus, Emöke Barath (Scylla), Anders J. Dahlin (Glaucus), Caroline Mutel (Circé), Les Nouveaux Caractères conducted by Sébastien d'Hérin — studio recording, Opéra Royal, Versailles, 29 Oct to 4 November 2014, Alpha Classics cat. Alpha 960
- Scylla et Glaucus, Chiara Skerath (Scylla), Mathias Vidal (Glaucus), Florine Valiquette (Circé), Il Giardino d’Amore conducted by Stefan Plewniak — studio recording, S2, Warsaw Polish Radio, 12–17 April 2021, Château de Versailles label
- Scylla et Glaucus, Judith van Wanroij (Scylla), Cyrille Dubois (Glaucus), Véronique Gens (Circé), Purcell Choir, Orfeo Orchestra, conducted by György Vashegyi — studio recording, Grand Hall, Liszt Academy, Budapest, 24–26 March 2022, Glossa label

== Notes and references ==
Notes
