= Meximieux =

Commune in Auvergne-Rhône-Alpes, France

Meximieux Mèssemiox (Arpitan)
- Commune
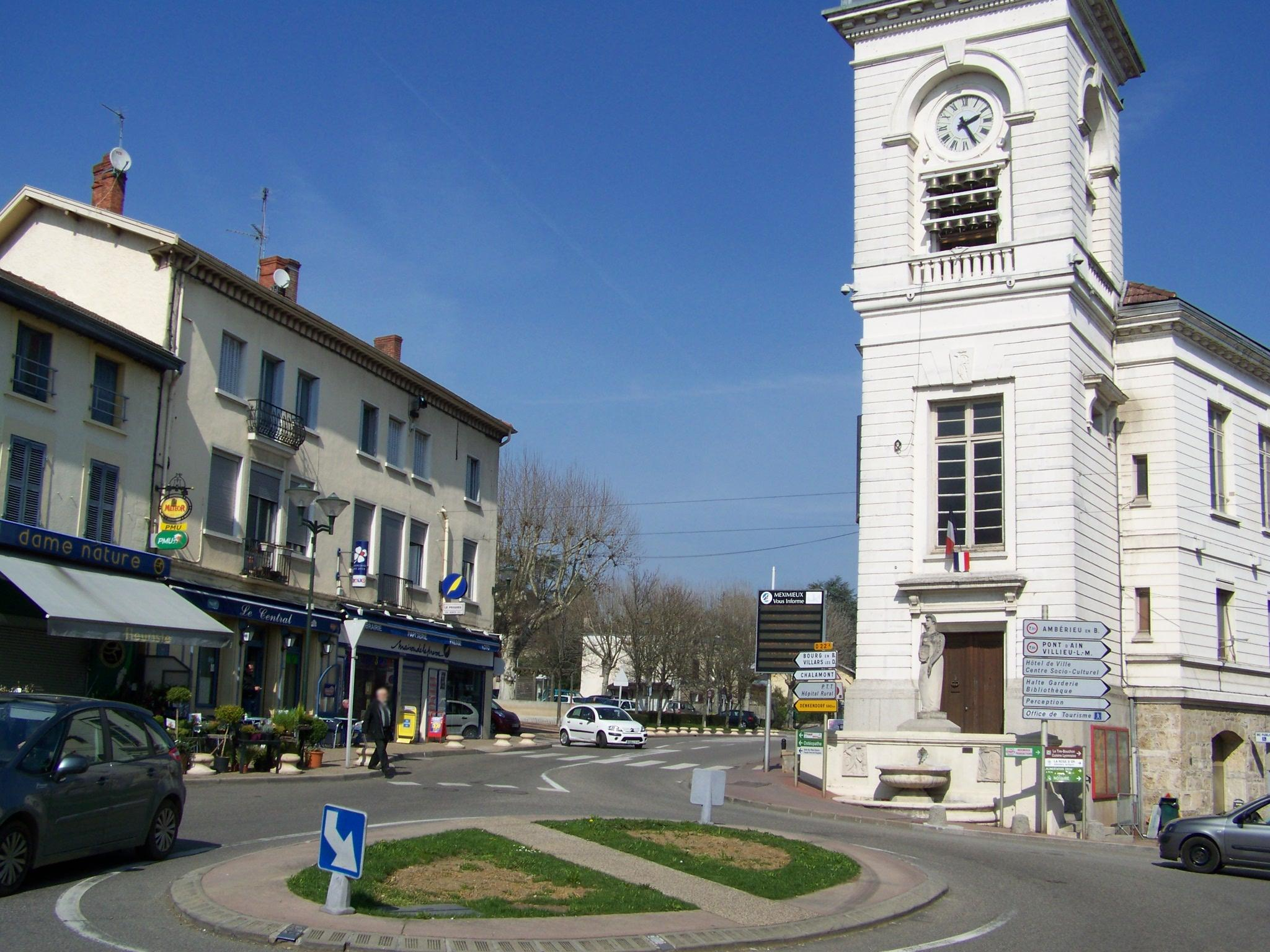

- Coat of arms
- Location of Meximieux
- Location within France Location within Auvergne-Rhône-Alpes
- Coordinates: 45°54′19″N 5°11′43″E
- Country: France
- Region: Auvergne-Rhône-Alpes
- Department: Ain
- Arrondissement: Belley
- Canton: Meximieux
- Intercommunality: Plaine de l'Ain

Government
  - Mayor (2020–2026): Jean-Luc Ramel
- Area^{1}: 13.80 km^{2} (5.33 sq mi)
- Elevation: 226 m (741 ft)
- Highest elevation: 310 m (1,020 ft)
- Lowest elevation: 206 m (676 ft)
- Population (2023): 8,247
  - Density: 597.6/km^{2} (1,548/sq mi)
- Time zone: UTC+01:00 (CET)
  - Summer (DST): UTC+02:00 (CEST)
- INSEE/Postal code: 01244 /01800
- ^{1} French Land Register data, which excludes lakes, ponds, glaciers > 1 km^{2} (0.386 sq mi or 247 acres) and river estuaries.

Meximieux (French pronunciation: [mɛksimjø]; Arpitan: Mèssemiox [mɛs.ˈmjy]) is a commune in the Ain department in eastern France.

== Geography ==
Located 35 km north east of Lyon and 10 km south west Ambérieu-en-Bugey, the town is where the Dombes plateau meets the plain of the river Ain. Historically, Meximieux was part of the former province of Bresse. Over the centuries, its importance has developed from its location on the main route between Lyon and Geneva, and it now lies on the Autoroute 42 from Lyon. Meximieux—Pérouges station has rail connections to Lyon, Ambérieu-en-Bugey and Chambéry.

== History ==
Records of Meximieux date back to Roman times when it home to a small farming settlement called Maximiacus.

== Population ==
Historical population

Year	Pop.	±% p.a.
1793	1,565	—
1800	1,691	+1.11%
1806	1,805	+1.09%
1821	1,765	−0.15%
1831	1,997	+1.24%
1836	2,065	+0.67%
1841	2,086	+0.20%
1846	2,286	+1.85%
1851	2,473	+1.58%
1856	2,439	−0.28%
1861	2,552	+0.91%
1866	2,559	+0.05%
1872	2,387	−1.15%
1876	2,363	−0.25%
1881	2,276	−0.75%
1886	2,250	−0.23%
1891	2,137	−1.03%
1896	2,138	+0.01%
1901	2,340	+1.82%

Year	Pop.	±% p.a.
1906	2,104	−2.10%
1911	1,858	−2.46%
1921	1,796	−0.34%
1926	1,895	+1.08%
1931	2,037	+1.46%
1936	2,044	+0.07%
1946	2,089	+0.22%
1954	2,132	+0.26%
1962	2,392	+1.45%
1968	2,669	+1.84%
1975	3,457	+3.76%
1982	4,253	+3.00%
1990	6,230	+4.89%
1999	6,840	+1.04%
2007	7,383	+0.96%
2012	7,304	−0.21%
2017	7,743	+1.17%
2023	8,247	+1.06%

Source: EHESS and INSEE (1968-2023)

Its inhabitants are known as Meximiards in French.

== International relations ==
The commune has developed a twin town agreement with:

- Denkendorf, Germany since 1986. Located in the German state of Baden-Württemberg.

== Personalities ==
The town was the birthplace of Claude Favre de Vaugelas, a 17th-century grammarian and man of letters.

== Resistance ==
Meximieux is one of the 17 French cities to be awarded with the medal of resistance (Médaille de la Résistance). The French resistants of Meximieux fought with the allies in an outstanding collaboration with the U.S. army. This resulted in the victory against a German counter offensive on Meximieux the 1 and 2 September 1944. U.S. Army General, Michael S. Davison, became an honorary citizen of Meximieux.

== See also ==
- Communes of the Ain department
