= Ambérieu station =

Railway station in Ambérieu-en-Bugey, France

Ambérieu-en-Bugey
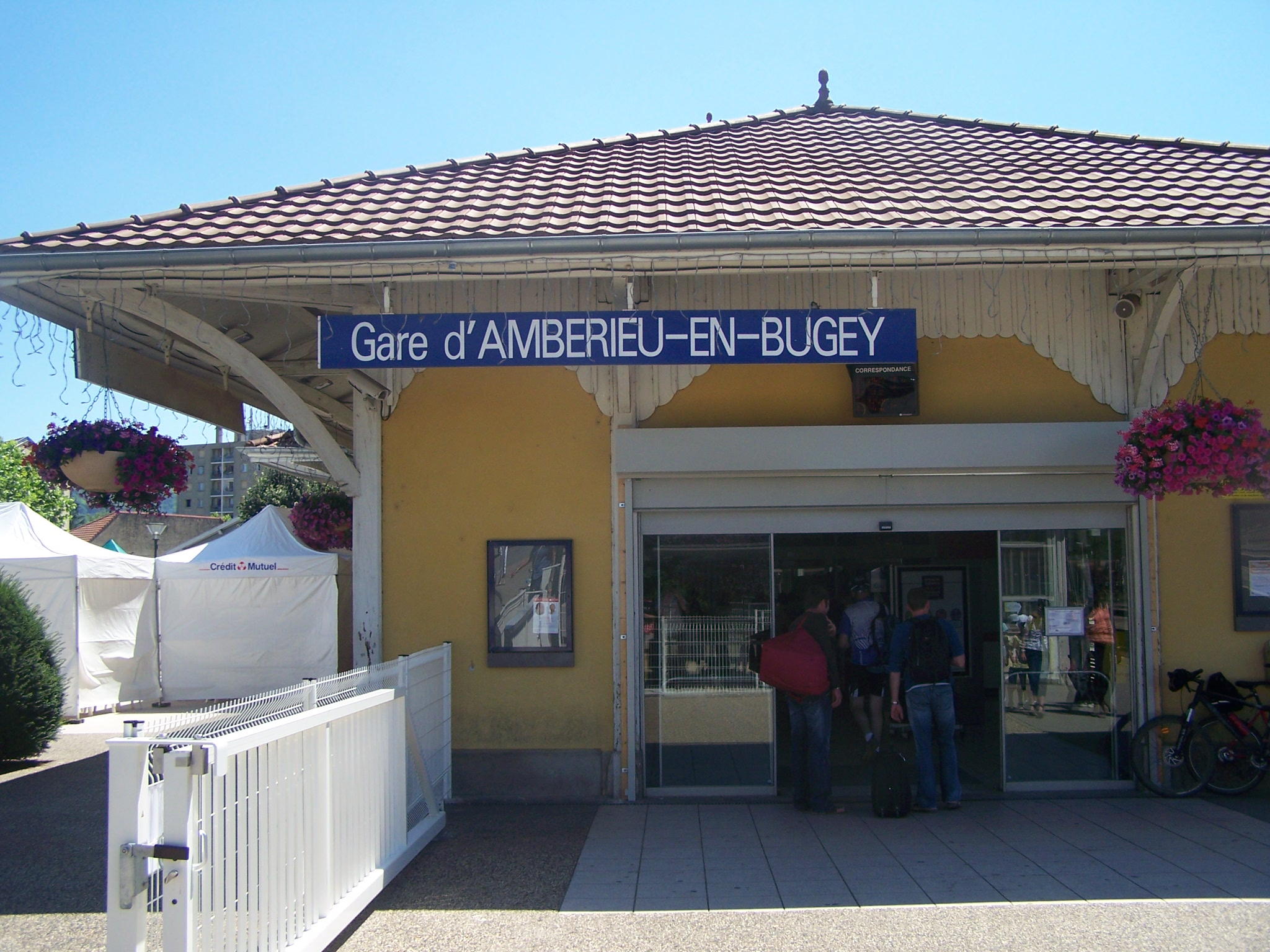
- Gare de Ambérieu

General information
- Location: Ambérieu-en-Bugey, Ain; Auvergne-Rhône-Alpes, France
- Coordinates: 45°57′14″N 5°20′33″E
- Elevation: 247 m (810 ft)
- Lines: Lyon–Geneva railway Mâcon–Ambérieu railway Ambérieu-Montalieu-Vercieu railway
- Platforms: 5
- Tracks: 3

Other information
- Station code: 87743716

History
- Opened: 1856; 170 years ago

Passengers
- 2024: 1,527,121

Services
Preceding station	TER Auvergne-Rhône-Alpes	Following station
Lyon-Part-Dieu Terminus	3	Tenay-Hauteville towards Saint-Gervais, Geneva or Évian-les-Bains
Lyon-Part-Dieu Terminus	4	Aix-les-Bains-Le Revard towards Annecy
Ambronay—Priay towards Mâcon	30	Terminus
Meximieux—Pérouges towards Lyon-Part-Dieu	35	Saint-Rambert-en-Bugey towards Chambéry
Location

Ambérieu station or Ambérieu-en-Bugey station (French: Gare d'Ambérieu or Gare d'Ambérieu-en-Bugey) is a railway station serving the town Ambérieu-en-Bugey, Ain department, eastern France. It is situated on the Lyon–Geneva railway, Mâcon–Ambérieu railway and Ambérieu-Montalieu-Vercieu railway. The train services are operated by SNCF.

== Train services ==
The station is served by regional trains towards Lyon, Bourg-en-Bresse, Geneva, Annecy and Chambéry.

- Regional service (TER Auvergne-Rhône-Alpes) Lyon - Ambérieu - Bellegarde - Genéve
- Regional service (TER Auvergne-Rhône-Alpes) Lyon - Ambérieu - Bellegarde - Annemasse - St Gervais-les-Bains
- Regional service (TER Auvergne-Rhône-Alpes) Lyon - Ambérieu - Bellegarde - Annemasse - Evian-les-Bains
- Regional service (TER Auvergne-Rhône-Alpes) Lyon - Ambérieu - Aix-les-Bains - Annecy
- Local service (TER Auvergne-Rhône-Alpes) Ambérieu - Bourg-en-Bresse - Mâcon
- Local service (TER Auvergne-Rhône-Alpes) (Lyon -) Ambérieu - Aix-les-Bains - Chambéry

== See also ==
- List of SNCF stations in Auvergne-Rhône-Alpes
