= Michelangelo Falvetti =

17th-century Italian composer

Michelangelo Falvetti (29 December 1642 – May or June 1697) was an Italian Baroque composer as well as a Catholic priest.

Falvetti was born in Melicuccà in Calabria, Kingdom of Naples on 29 December 1642, but spent most of his life and musical career in the Kingdom of Sicily. In 1670, he became Maestro di Cappella in Palermo, and in 1679 founded the 'Unione dei Musici' in that city. In or around 1682, he moved to Messina, where he was named Maestro di Cappella by the Senate of Messina. Little is known about Falvetti's life after he gave up his post of Maestro di Cappella in 1695. He most likely died in Messina in May or June 1697.

== Works, editions and recordings ==
Works written in Palermo:

- Abel figura dell'agnello eucaristico (1676)
- La spada di Gedeone (1678)
- La Giuditta (1680)
- Il trionfo dell'anima (16??)

Works written in Messina:

- Il diluvio universale (1682) - includes sung parts for Noah, Rad, Water, Death, Divine Justice, God, Human Nature, - recording Leonardo García-Alarcón, La Cappella Mediterranea, Choeur de chambre de Namur. Ambronay 2011
- Il Nabucco (1683) - recording Leonardo García-Alarcón, La Cappella Mediterranea, Choeur de chambre de Namur. Ambronay 2013
- Il sole fermato da Giosuè (1692)
