= Ambronay–Priay station =

Railway station in Ambronay, France

Coordinates: 46.0116°N 5.3383°E

Ambronay–Priay
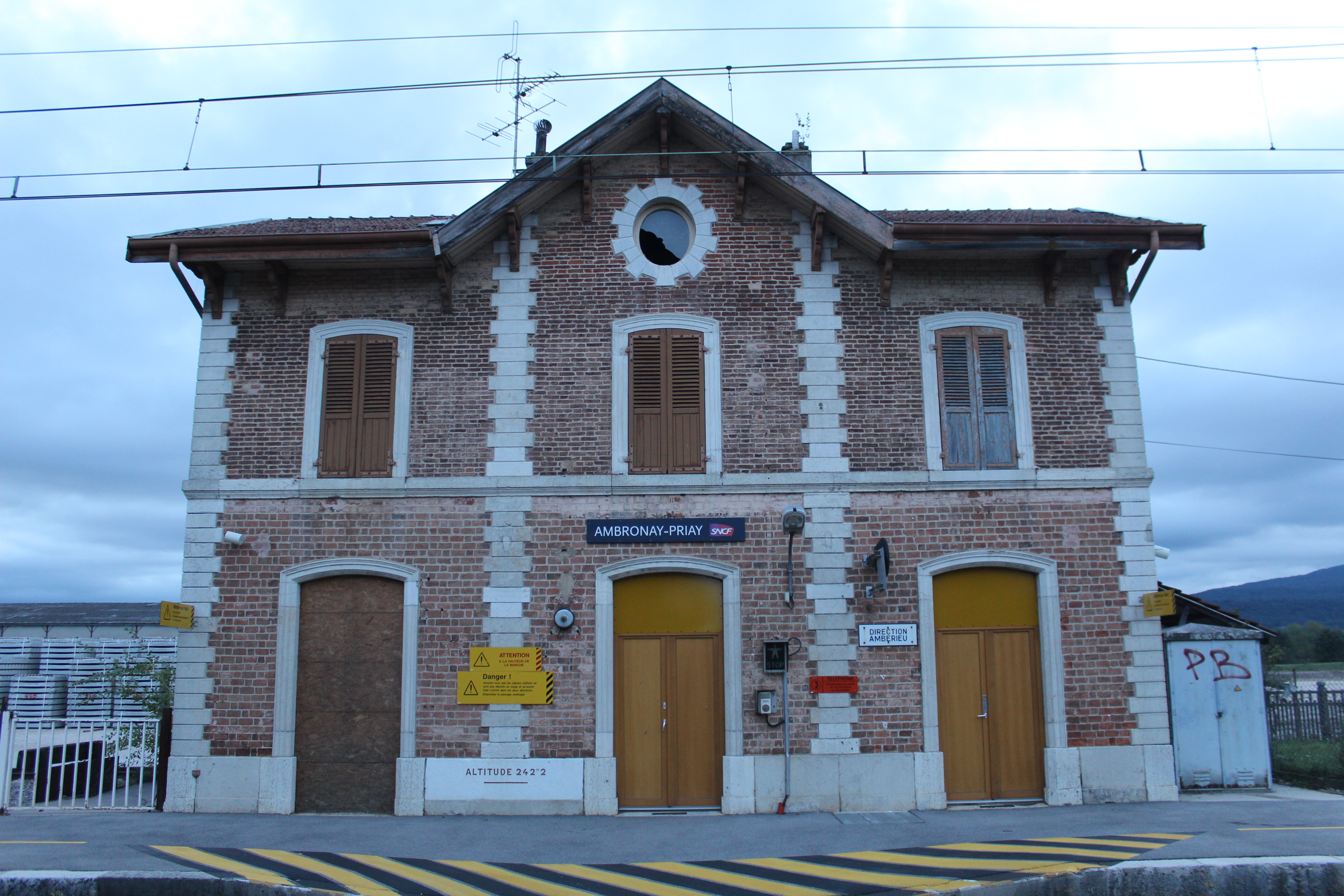
- Station building in 2017.

General information
- Location: Rue de la Gare; 01500 Ambronay
- Elevation: 252 m (827 ft)
- Owner: SNCF
- Operator: SNCF
- Line: Mâcon—Ambérieu railway
- Distance: 61.274 km
- Platforms: 2
- Tracks: 2

History
- Opened: 23 June 1856; 170 years ago

Passengers
- 2019: 9,145

Services
| Preceding station | TER Auvergne-Rhône-Alpes | Following station |
|---|---|---|
| Pont-d'Ain towards Mâcon | 30 | Ambérieu Terminus |
Location

Ambronay–Priay station (French: Gare de Abronay–Priay) is a French railway station located in commune of Ambronay, Ain department in the Auvergne-Rhône-Alpes region. As its name suggests, the station also serves the nearby commune of Priay. It is located at kilometric point (KP) 61.274 on the Mâcon—Ambérieu railway.

The station was opened in 1856 by the Compagnie des chemins de fer de Paris à Lyon et à la Méditerranée (PLM).

As of 2020, the station is owned and operated by the SNCF and served by TER Auvergne-Rhône-Alpes trains.

== History ==
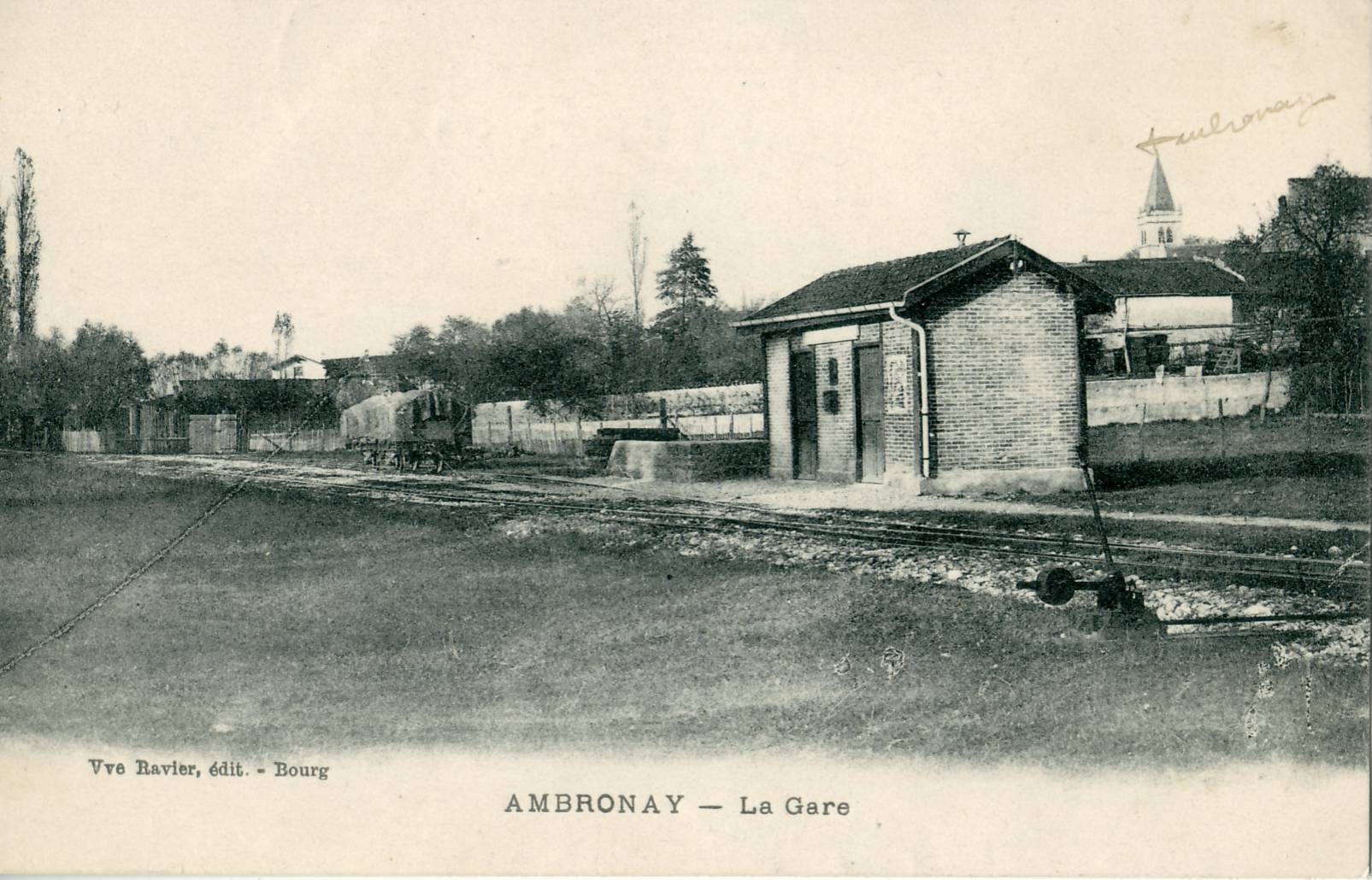
Original station building.

In 2019, the SNCF estimated that 9,145 passengers traveled through the station.

== Services ==
=== Passenger services ===
Classified as a PANG (point d'accès non géré), the station is unstaffed without any passenger services.

=== Train services ===
As of 2020, the station is served by TER Auvergne-Rhône-Alpes line 30 trains between Mâcon and Ambérieu.

=== Intermodality ===
In addition to passenger vehicle parking, the station is equipped with storage racks and facilities for bicycles.

The station is also served by TER bus and car service in addition to trains.

== See also ==
- List of SNCF stations in Auvergne-Rhône-Alpes
