= Ambronay Abbey =

- Abbey of Our Lady, Ambronay; Abbaye Notre-Dame d'Ambronay
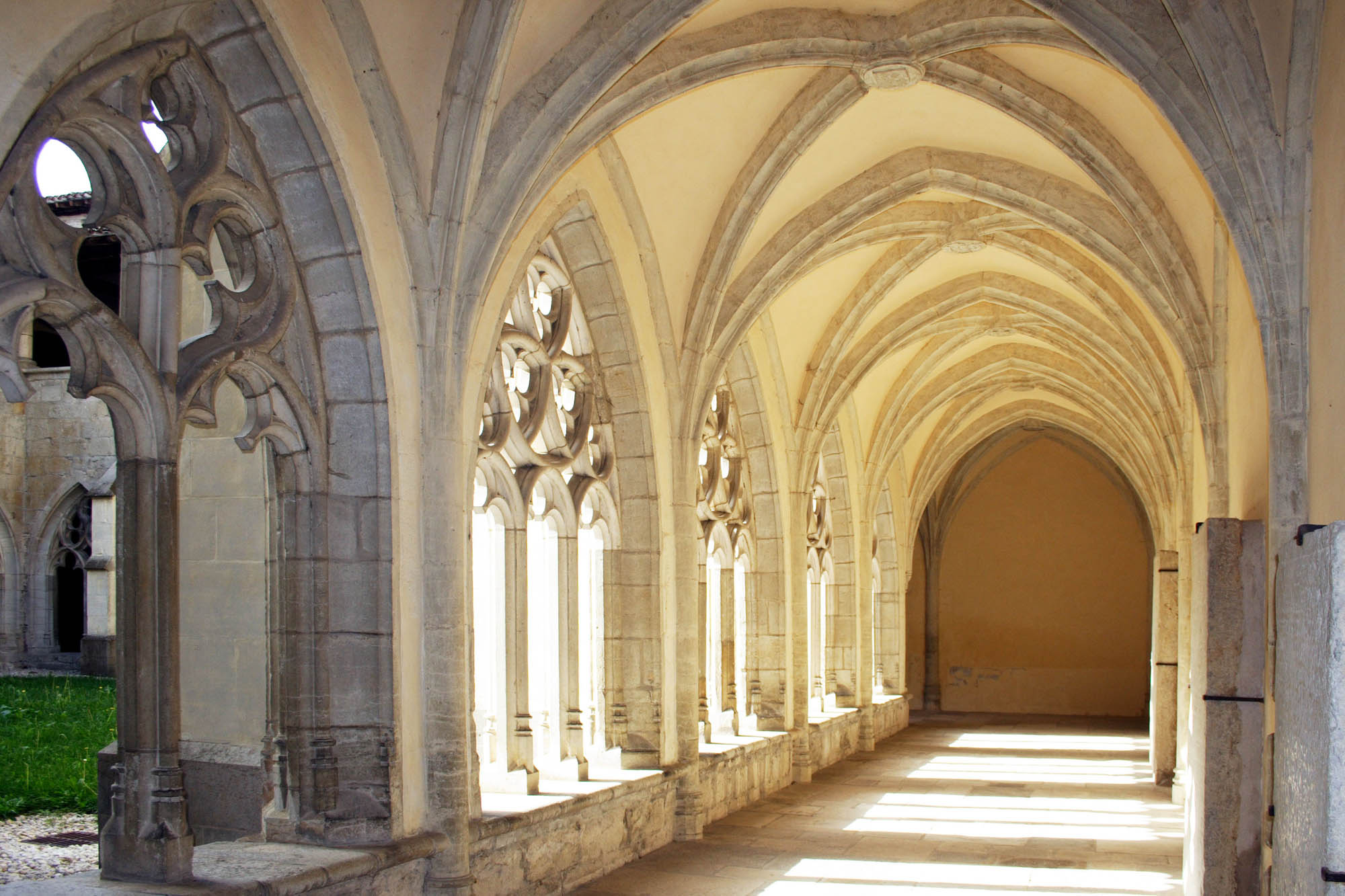
- Cloister of Ambronay Abbey

- Location in France
- 46.00656°N 5.36179°E
- Location: Ambronay, Ain
- Country: France
- Denomination: Roman Catholic

Ambronay Abbey (French: Abbaye Notre-Dame d'Ambronay; Abbey of Our Lady, Ambronay) is a Benedictine abbey, founded in the 11th century by Barnard de Romans, which stands in the commune of Ambronay in the Ain department, in the Auvergne-Rhône-Alpes region.

== History ==
A church was founded on the site by hermits in the 7th century, but this was destroyed by Saracens. A monastery was built here in around 803 by Saint Bernard of Vienne, the first abbot.

Most of the abbey was destroyed during the French Revolution in 1793 but the church, although converted into stables, survived and is once again a place of worship.

== Description ==
The surviving structures comprise a cloister and some buildings surrounding it, and the former abbey church, now the parish church of Ambronay. It is principally a Gothic building of the mid-13th century, with 15th-century additions, although the façade of one of the naves dates from the 9th century.

The church is regarded as a sanctuary of the Blessed Virgin Mary.

Its excellent acoustics have led to its hosting the Ambronay Festival, an international festival of Baroque music.
