= Chœur de chambre de Namur =

The Choeur de Chambre de Namur (founded 1987) is a choir based in Namur, which is sponsored by the Communauté française de Belgique. Since 2010 the artistic director has been Leonardo García Alarcón and conductor of the instrumental ensemble is Guy Van Waas.

The choir has worked with many visiting conductors: Louis Devos, Eric Ericson, Marc Minkowski, Pierre Cao, Jean-Claude Malgoire, Simon Halsey, Sigiswald Kuijken, Jean Tubéry, Roy Goodman, Michael Schneider, Philippe Herreweghe, Peter Phillips, Jordi Savall, Christophe Rousset, and Eduardo López Banzo.

The choir has a baroque instrumental ensemble, Les Agrémens which works exclusively in session under the direction of invited conductors or the current chief conductor Guy Van Waas.
