= Paolo Tarditi =

Italian baroque composer and organist

Paolo Tarditi (c. 1580 – 1661) was an Italian baroque composer and organist active in Rome. He substituted violin and cornet for the soprano voices in two of his choral works.
