= Sébastien d'Hérin =

French harpsichordist and conductor

Sébastien d'Hérin is a French harpsichordist and conductor. As a harpsichordist he studied under Gustav Leonhardt, Pierre Hantaï, Bob van Asperen, Kenneth Gilbert and Christophe Rousset. He founded his own ensemble, Les Nouveaux Caractères in 2006 with which he has led performances of operas including works of Purcell, Sisyphe amoureux d'Égine from Les Fêtes de Thétis by Colin de Blamont (second act Titon et l'Aurore by Bernard de Bury), and Philémon et Baucis by Haydn.

== Discography ==
- Rameau: Les surprises de l'Amour (3 CDs, Glossa, 2013)
- Leclair: Scylla et Glaucus (3 CDs, Alpha, 2015)
