= Ambronay =

Commune in Auvergne-Rhône-Alpes, France

- Commune
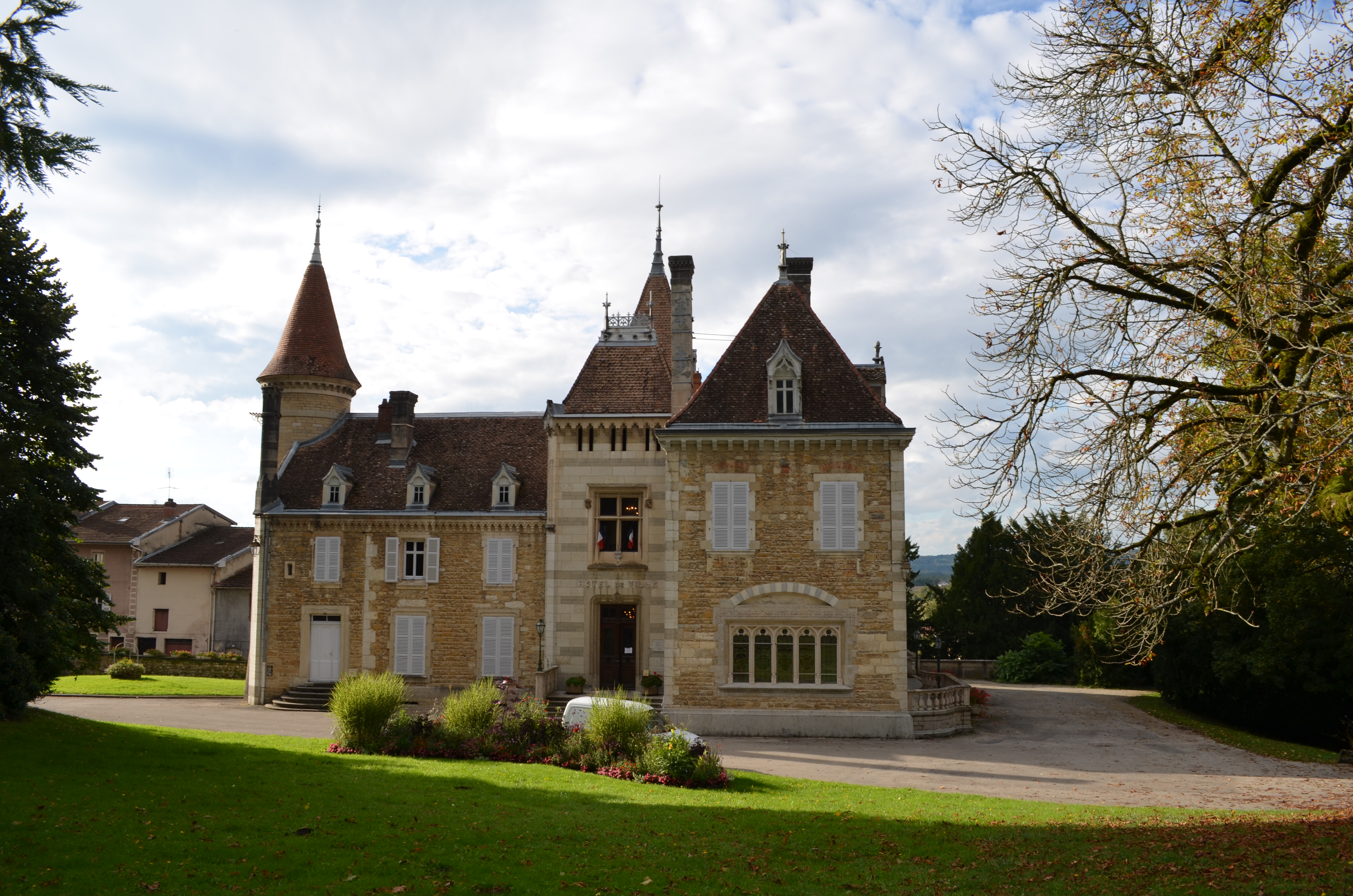
- Town hall

- Coat of arms
- Location of Ambronay
- Location within France Location within Auvergne-Rhône-Alpes
- Coordinates: 46°00′23″N 5°21′40″E
- Country: France
- Region: Auvergne-Rhône-Alpes
- Department: Ain
- Arrondissement: Belley
- Canton: Ambérieu-en-Bugey
- Intercommunality: La Plaine de l'Ain

Government
  - Mayor (2026–32): Vincent Mancuso
- Area^{1}: 33.55 km^{2} (12.95 sq mi)
- Elevation: 246 m (807 ft)
- Highest elevation: 765 m (2,510 ft)
- Lowest elevation: 225 m (738 ft)
- Population (2023): 2,841
  - Density: 84.68/km^{2} (219.3/sq mi)
- Time zone: UTC+01:00 (CET)
  - Summer (DST): UTC+02:00 (CEST)
- INSEE/Postal code: 01007 /01500
- Website: https://www.ambronay.fr/
- ^{1} French Land Register data, which excludes lakes, ponds, glaciers > 1 km^{2} (0.386 sq mi or 247 acres) and river estuaries.

Ambronay (French pronunciation: [ɑ̃bʁɔnɛ]) is a commune in the Ain department in the Auvergne-Rhône-Alpes region of eastern France.

The commune covers an area of 33.55 km^{2} (12.95 sq mi).

== Geography ==
The commune of Ambronay is at the centre of a semicircle of mountains at the foot of the westernmost foothills of the Jura Mountains and is bordered in the west by the river Ain.

Ambronay is located some 50 km west of Annecy and some 50 km north-east of Lyon. The A42 autoroute (E611) traverses the western part of the commune from north to south with an exit to the D12 near the hamlet of Genoud. The D1075 road runs parallel to and east of the Autoroute from Pont-d'Ain in the north to Saint-Denis-en-Bugey in the south. The D12 and D12A road runs from Priay in the west through the commune to the village. The D36 road also runs north-east from the D1075 from the southern border of the commune to the village and continues north-east to Saint-Jean-le-Vieux. there are also numerous local roads covering the whole commune. A railway line runs from Pont d'Ain in the north to Amberieu-en-Bugey in the south parallel to and near the D1075 road. There is a railway station (Ambronay—Priay) in the commune west of the village just north of the D12A road.

It is a rural commune with a land area of 3,355 hectares of which 720 are wooded - mostly in the east.

There are a number of hamlets in the commune. These are:

- Championnierre
- Chenavieux
- Coutelieu
- Genoud
- Les Ambrines
- Longeville
- Malafan
- Merland
- Vorgey

The highest point is at a place called le Morimont which rises to 643m; on the plain the lowest point is 299m near the hamlet of Genoud.

The Ain river flows to the south just west of the commune and a number of streams flow from the commune to this river including the Cozance and the Seymard. There are a number of small lakes to the north of the village.

== Toponymy ==
The name Ambronay may come from one of the Germanic and Celtic tribes, the Ambrones, that fought the Roman Republic and its allies in the Cimbrian War (113–101 BCE). The tribal alliance fought at least three major battles against Roman forces in southern Gaul.

== History ==
Roman remains are evidence of the distant origins of Ambronay. An Irish monk initially founded an abbey of women. Then in 800 Saint Barnard, an officer of the court of Charlemagne, undertook the restoration of the original buildings and installed a monastery which followed the rule of Saint Benedict. He obtained full independence for the abbey and, over the centuries, it became increasingly powerful. In a papal bull of 1051 Pope Leo IX attested to that independence. Greed and many wars, however, led to the Abbey asking the Savoyards for protection in 1282. Ambronay was then fortified.

In 1470 the city had its current coat of arms and in 1601 it was attached to the kingdom of France by the Treaty of Lyon. Biron levelled the Dauphine tower and the decline of the Abbey continued until 1652 when it was attached to the rich congregation of monks of Saint Maur. Large restoration works were undertaken.

The French Revolution removed all religious orders on 12 July 1790 and everything from Ambronay was scattered. The cloister was converted into a prison. In 1793 Albitte pulled down the abbey tower. It was not until 21 December 1889 that Canon Garcin and MP Alexandre Bérard obtained the beginning of the classification as a historical monument of the Abbey, followed in 1905 by the cloister. The town has had its present form since 1762. The main street was then famous but then lost its covered walkway, the northern quarter, and two of its three gates. Only the Gargouille gate has been preserved.

Ambronay appears as Ambronay on the 1750 Cassini Map and the same on the 1790 version.

A military camp was located on the plain in 1916 to provide bread to soldiers at the front during the First World War. It finally closed in June 2008.

The International Baroque Music Festival was created in 1980. In 2003 the Cultural Encounter Centre of Ambronay was opened.

The restoration of old buildings continues and was a part of the French government project 1000 Projets in 2009.

=== Heraldry ===
Arms of Aigrefeuille d'Aunis	Blazon: Gules, charged with 13 lictor's rods Tawny radiant with ears of wheat the same tied in Or.

== Administration ==
List of mayors of Ambronay

From	To	Name	Party
1971	1983	François Beau	
1983	2001	Daniel Benassy	DVG
2001	2008	Gabriel Fournier	UDF
2008	2014	Robert Greffet	
2014	2020	Gisèle Levrat	DVG
2020	2023	Marie-Christine Barillot	
2023		Vincent Mancuso	

== Population ==
Historical population
Year	Pop.	±% p.a.
1968	1,193	—
1975	1,270	+0.90%
1982	1,862	+5.62%
1990	1,996	+0.87%
1999	2,146	+0.81%
2007	2,263	+0.67%
2012	2,437	+1.49%
2017	2,726	+2.27%
2023	2,841	+0.69%
Source: INSEE

== Economy ==
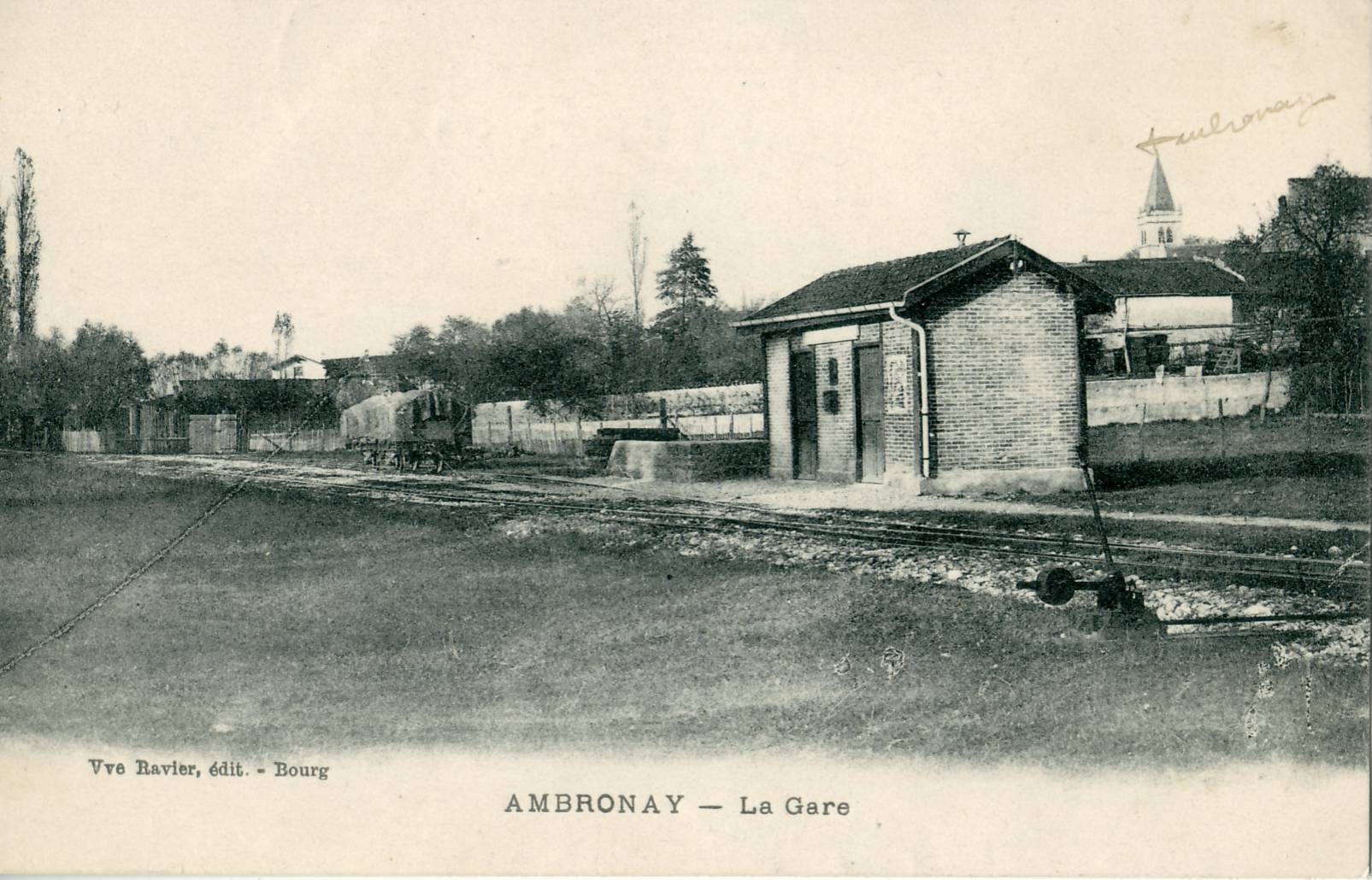
The Ambronay—Priay Station at the beginning of the 20th century

=== Financial year 2008 ===
Elements of calculation

- Total population DGF = 2,316
- Potential 4 taxes = 1,250,326
- Financial potential = 1,533,145
- Financial potential by population DGF = ~ 661.98
- Financial potential per capita stratum = ~ 727.92

Main financial resources

- Buildings (before capping) = 255,016
- Undeveloped land (before capping) = 30,713
- Housing tax (before capping) = 200,943
- Block grant = 499,653
- assets of Urban solidarity (DSU) = 6,776
- Total assets (Lump - DSU - DSR - DNP) = 506,429

Total per population by DGF = ~ 218.66

The commune of Ambronay has a total of about 800 households, whose average income (in 2004) was around €16,200 / year. More than half of households had two vehicles (average of less than one third nationally).

The working population is about 1,000 with an unemployment rate above 9%. The commune has 82 business enterprises with core businesses being trades, construction, and particularly services.

== Culture and heritage ==
=== Civil heritage ===
The commune has a number of sites that are registered as historical monuments:

- Fort Sarrazin (1323)
- The Chateau of Silans Park
- The Town Hall Park. The Town Hall is an old chateau from the 16th century and was rebuilt in the 19th century.
- The Chateau of Saint-Gras Park

=== Religious heritage ===
The commune has two religious sites that are registered as historical monuments:

- The old Abbey of Our Lady of Ambronay (13th century)
- The Cloister Garden
- The former abbey church, Church of Our Lady of the Assumption, contains a large number of items that are registered as historical objects.

Picture Gallery of the Abbey

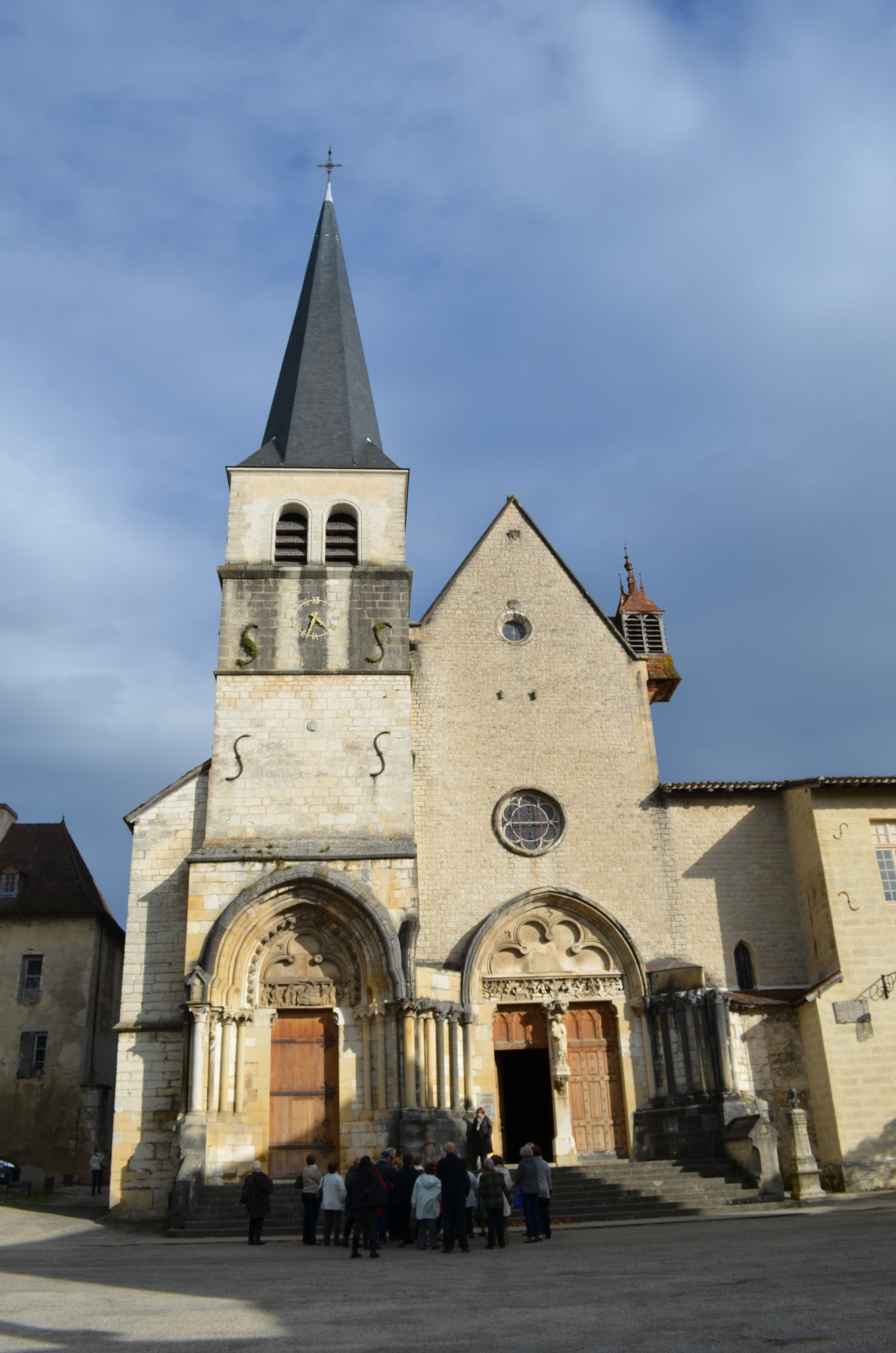
Exterior of the Abbey

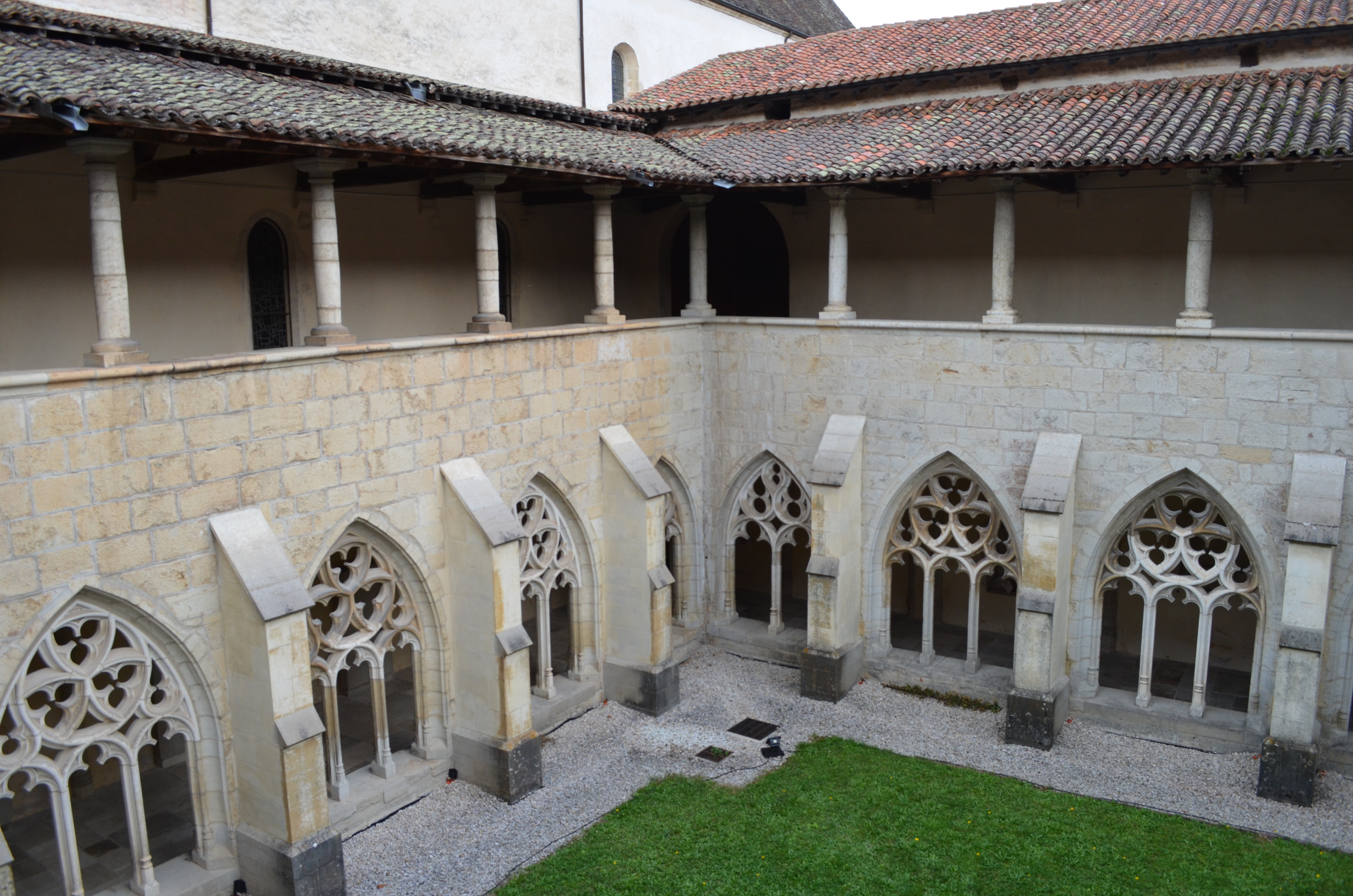
Cloister of the Abbey

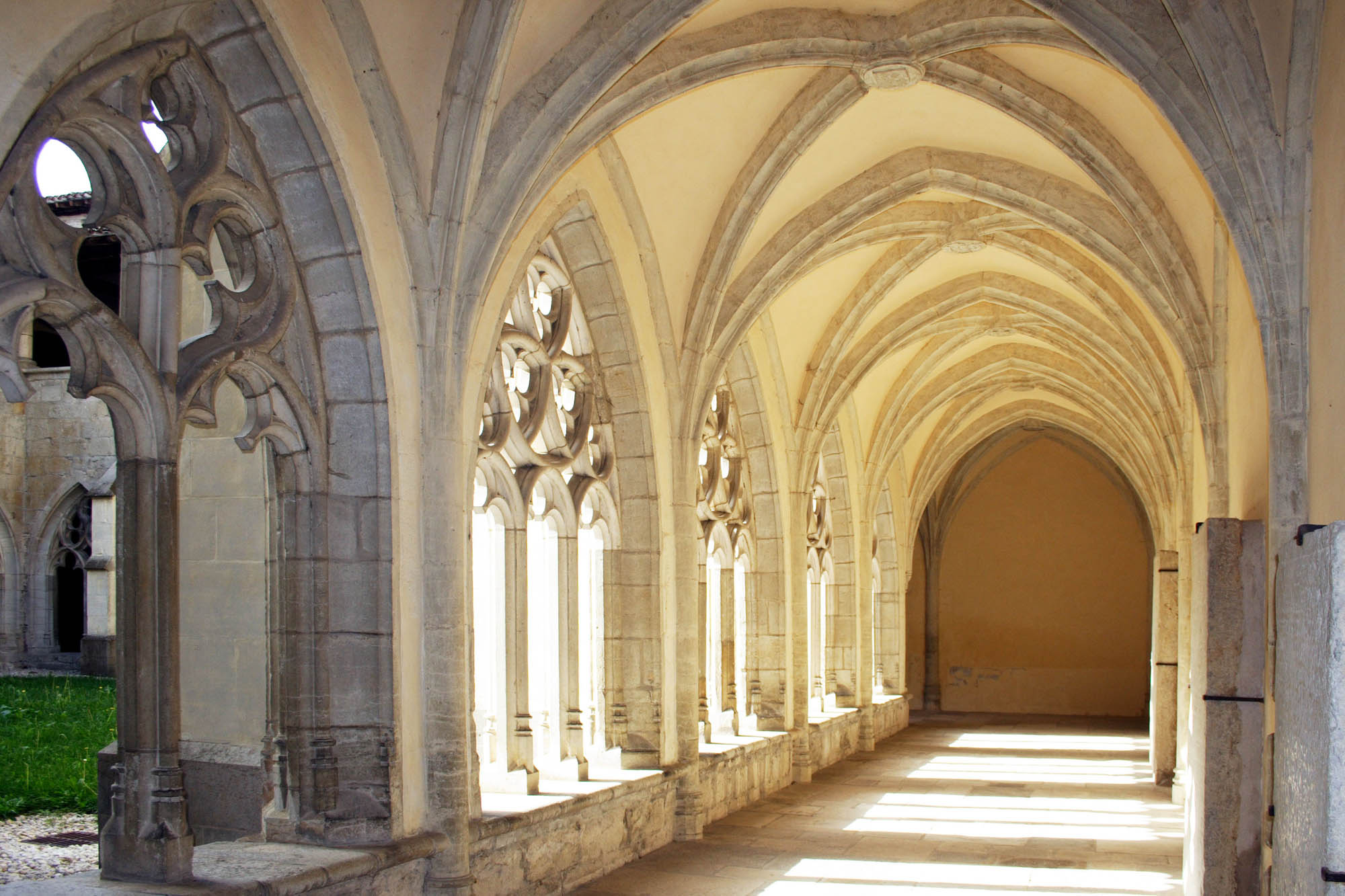
Inside a cloister

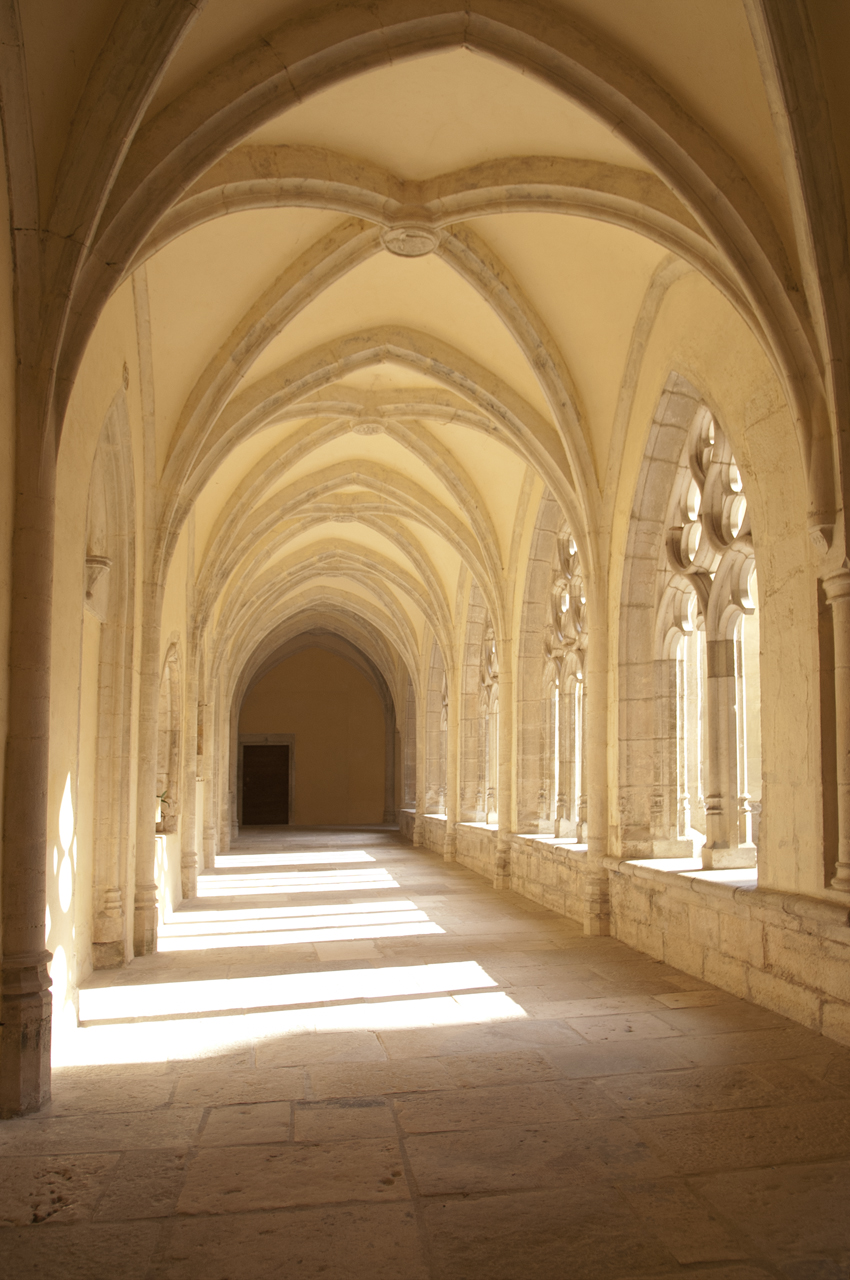
View of the cloister

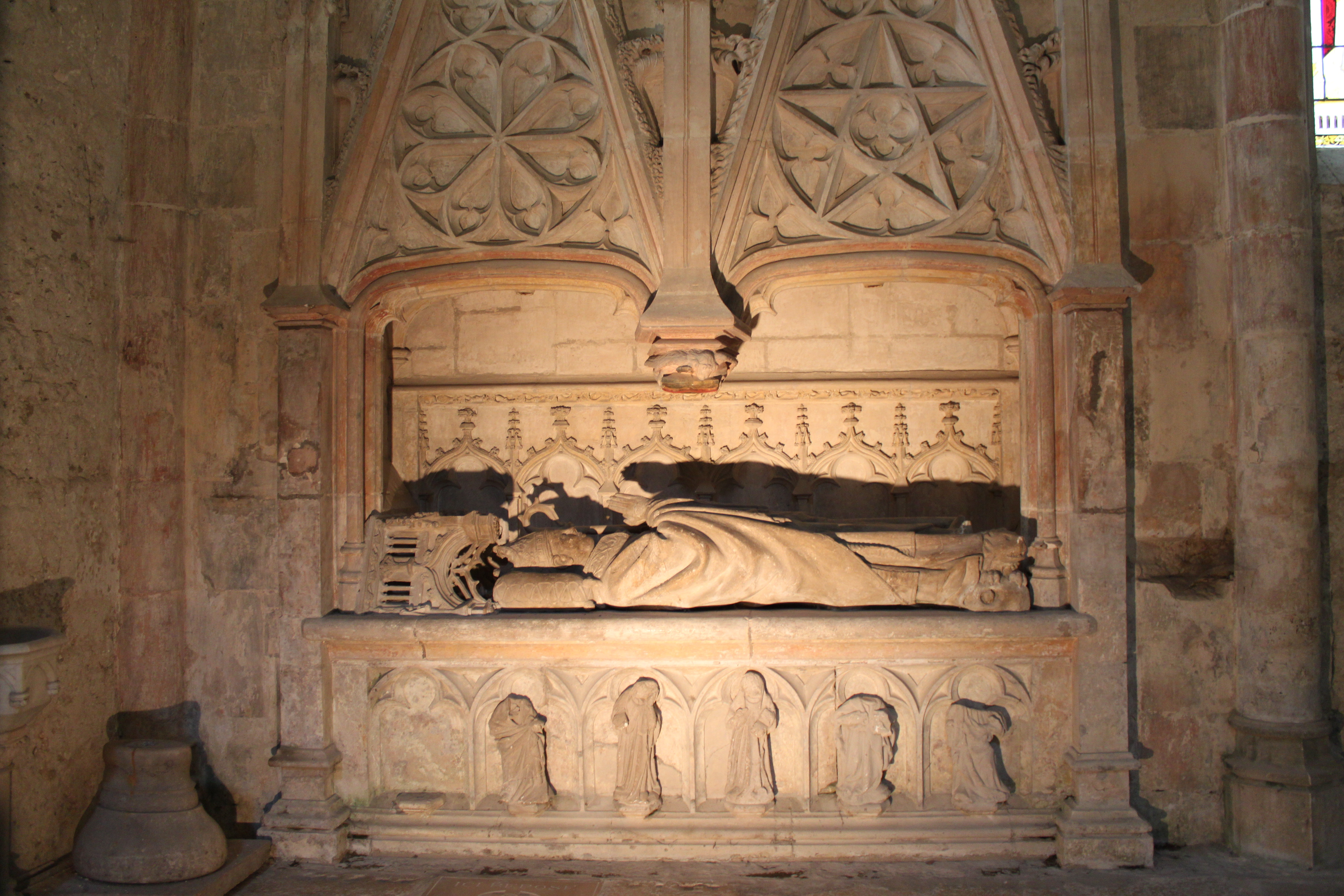
Recumbent Statue of Jacques de Mauvoisin, Abbot of Ambronay from 1425 to 1437, 15th century

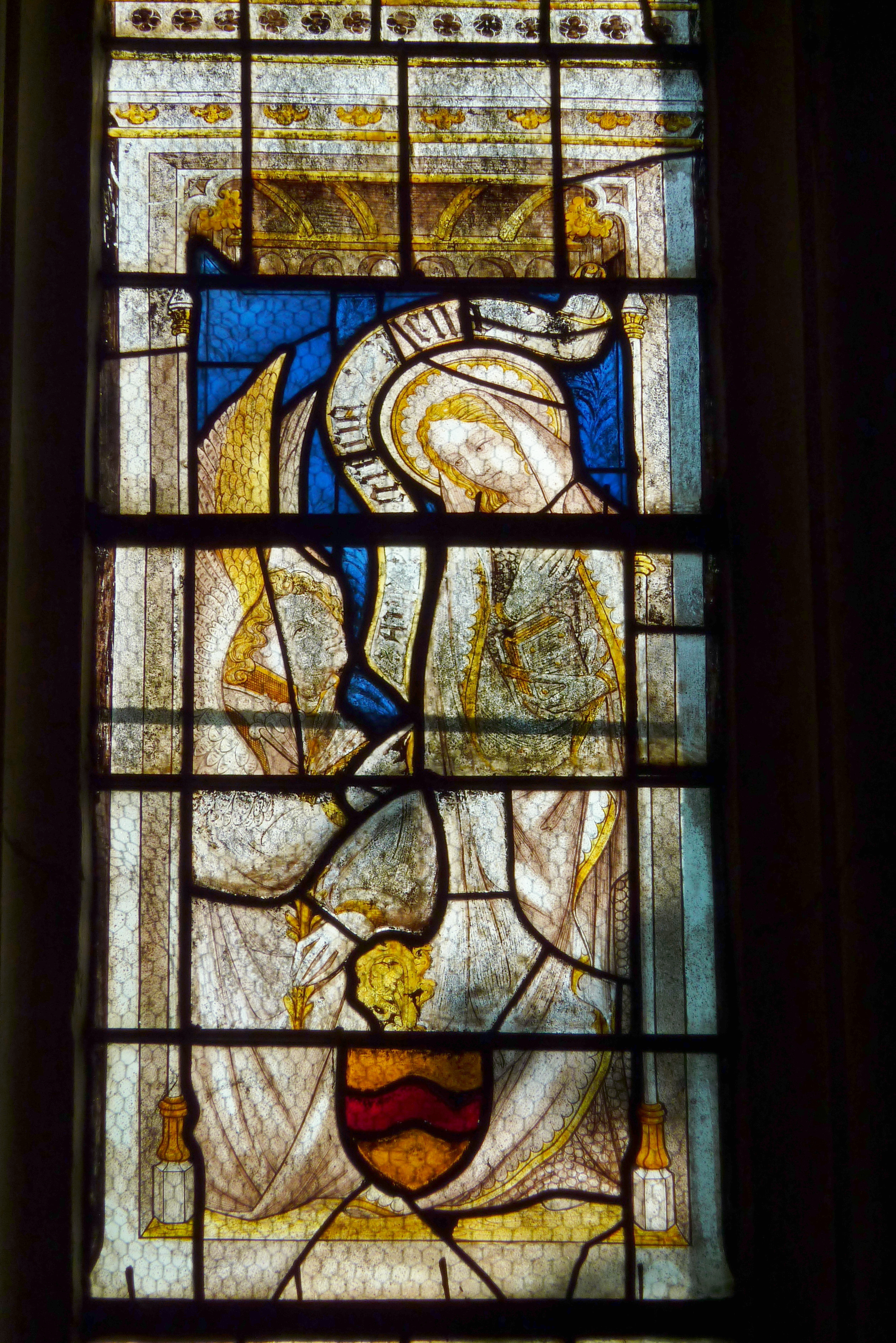
Stained Glass in the abbey

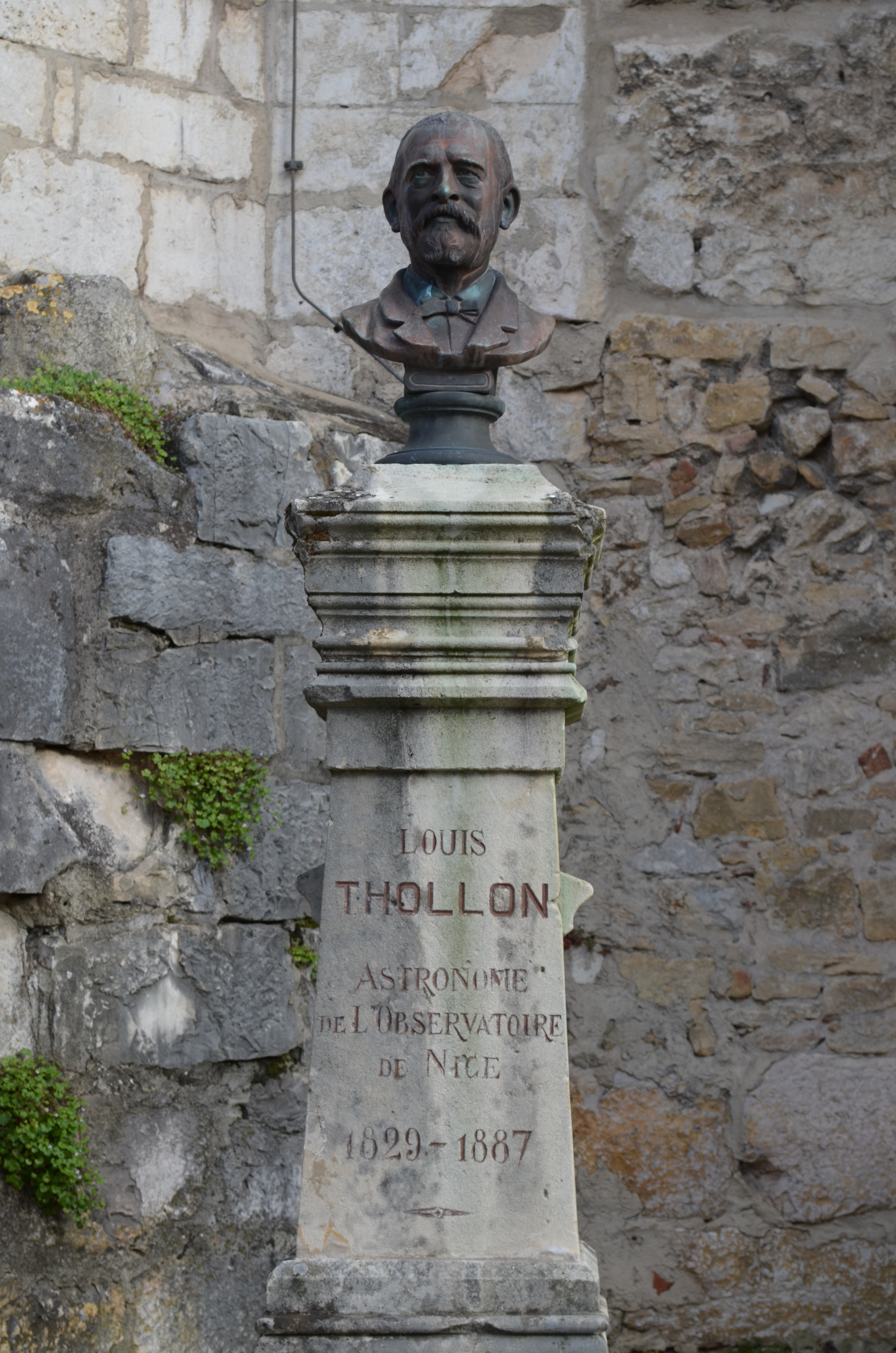
Bust of Louis Thallon

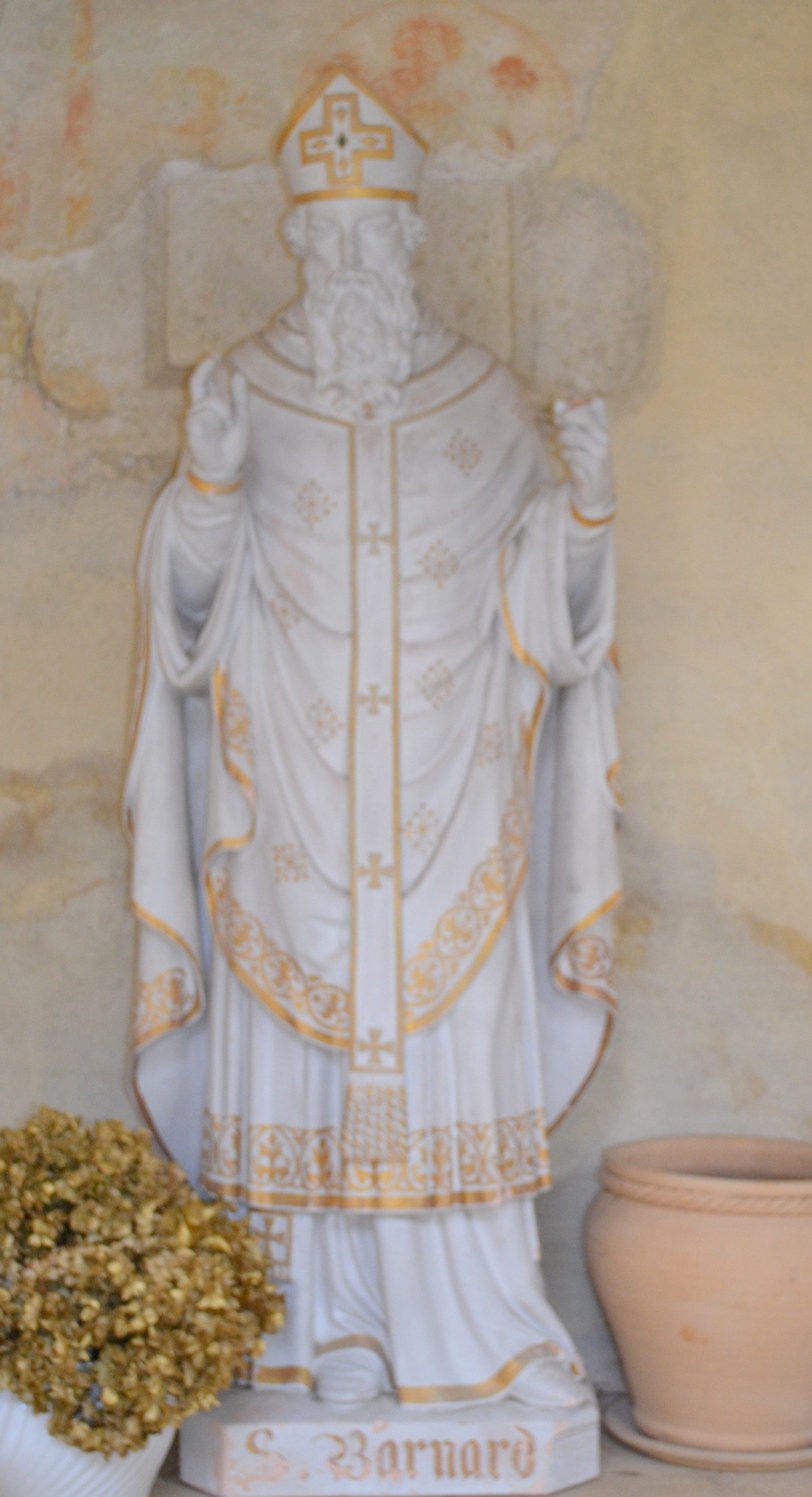
Statue of Saint Bernard

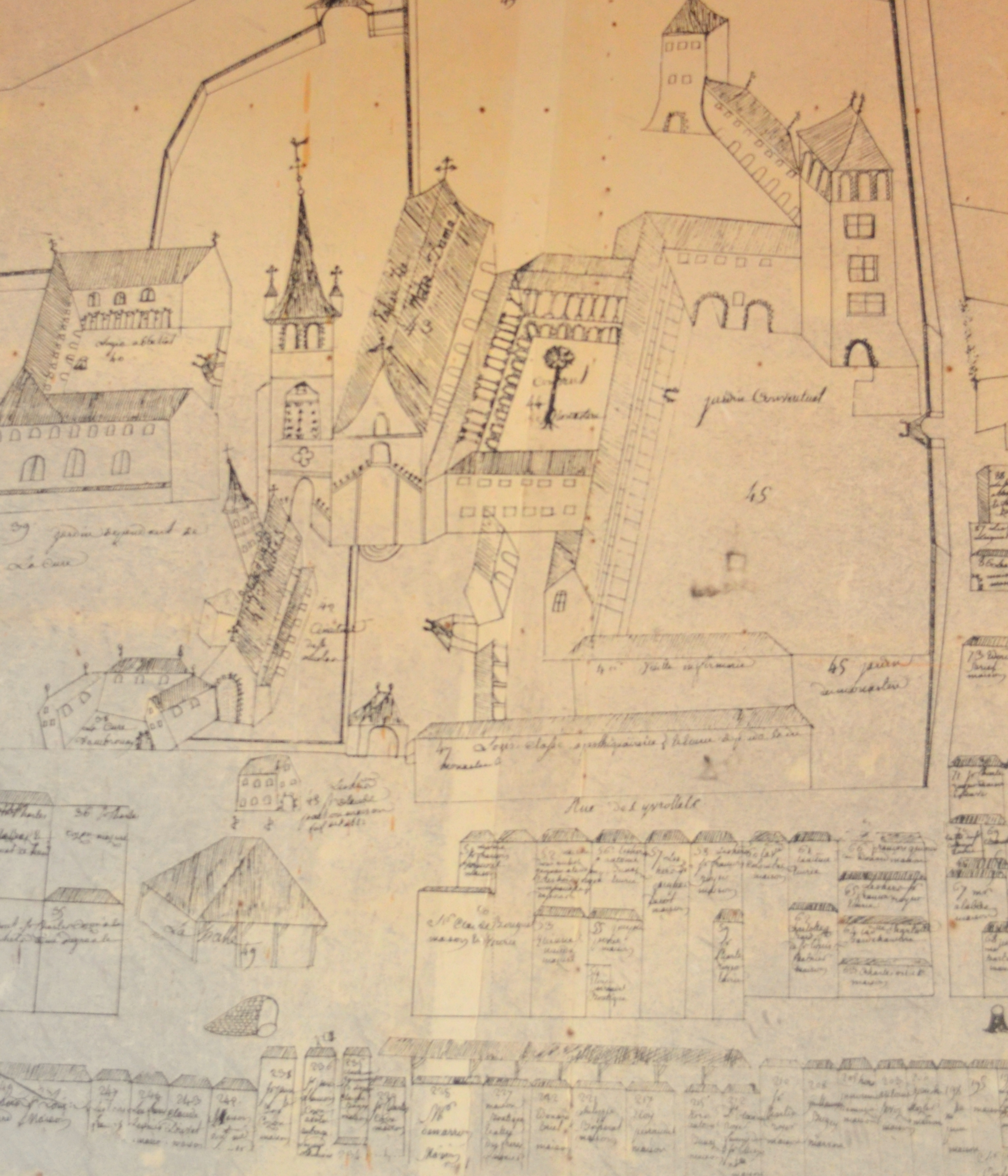
Village Plan in the stairs in the old library

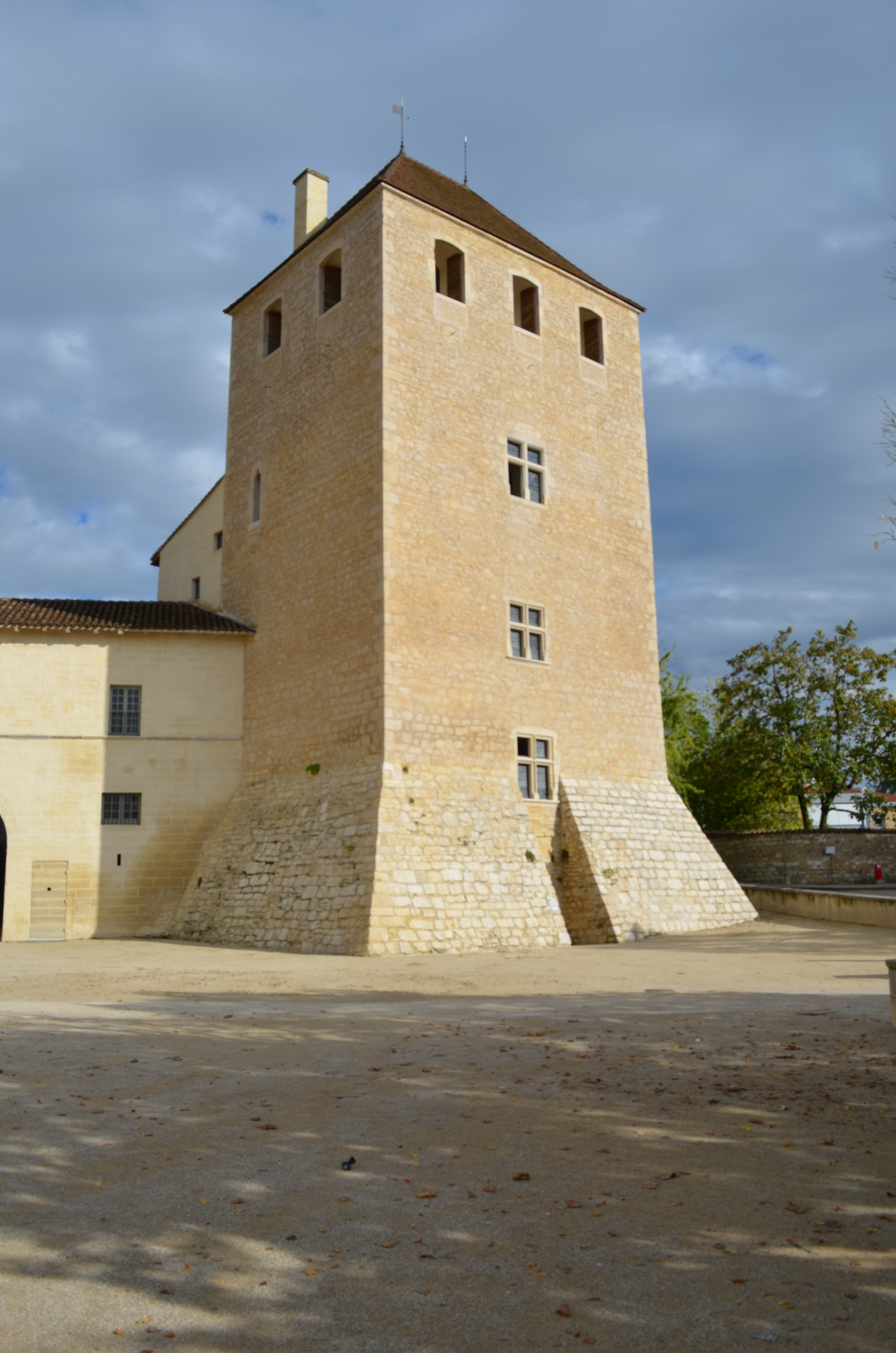
The Archives Tower of the Abbey

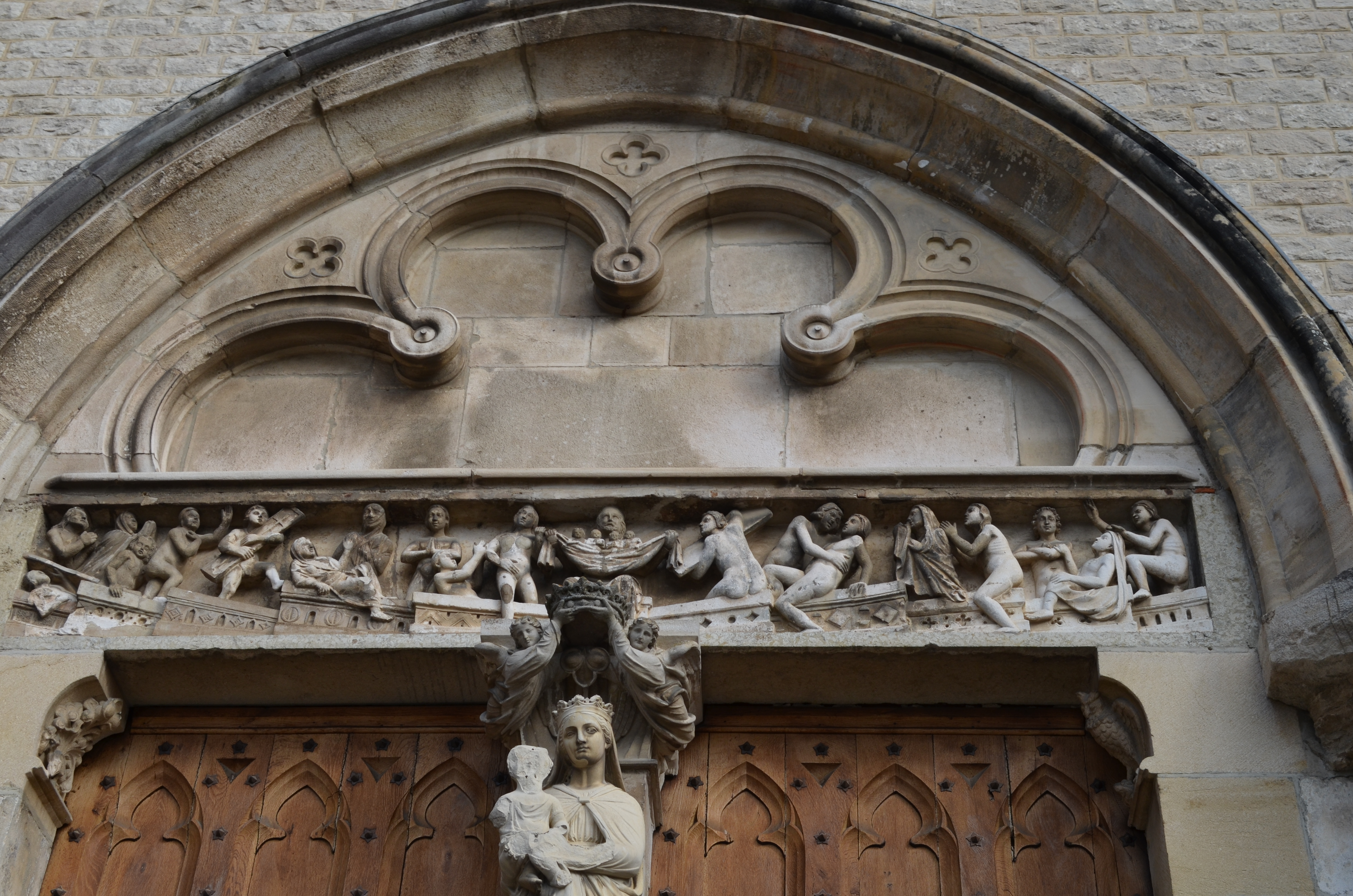
Detail above a door to the Abbey

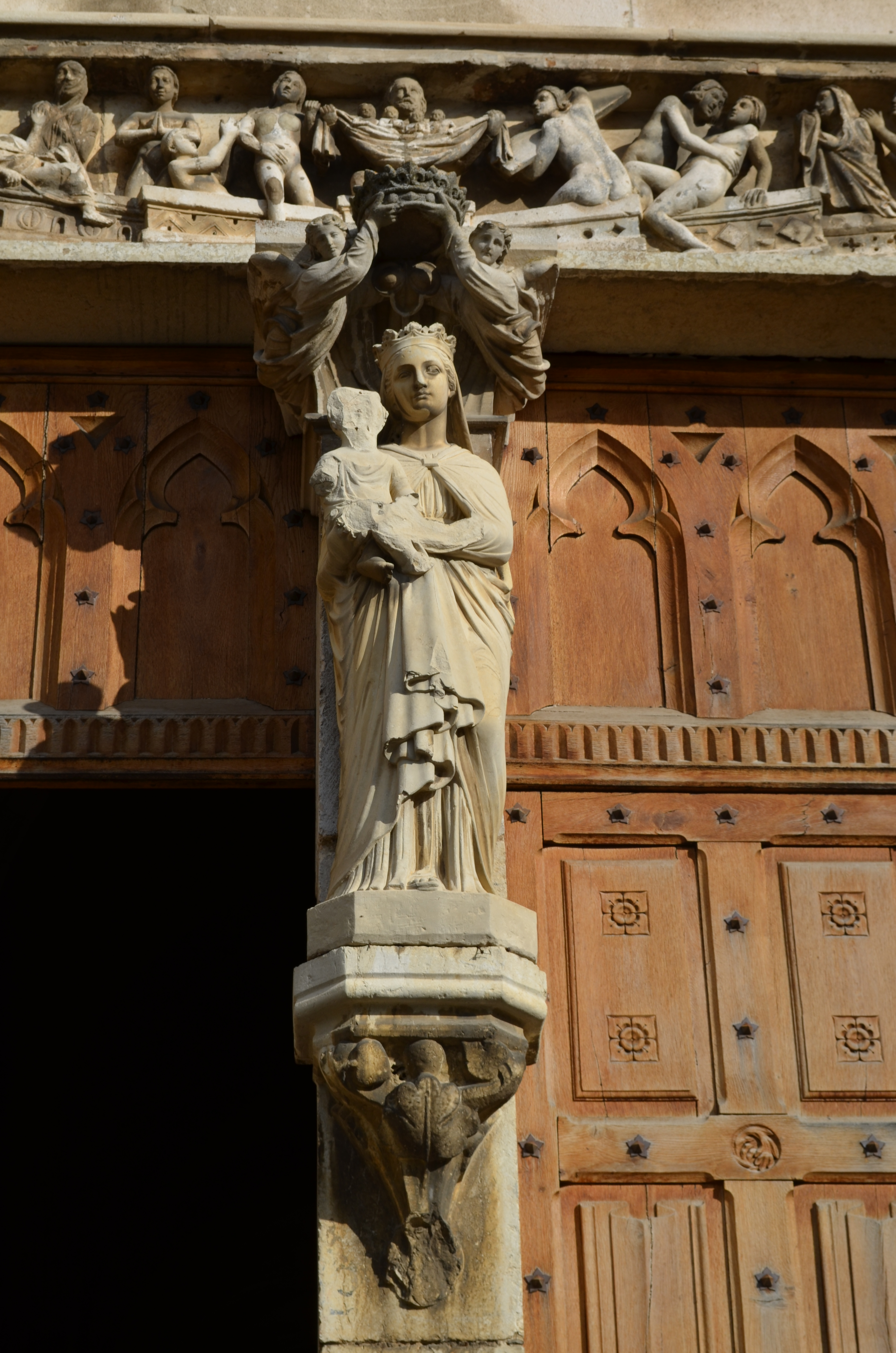
Statue on the exterior of the Abbey

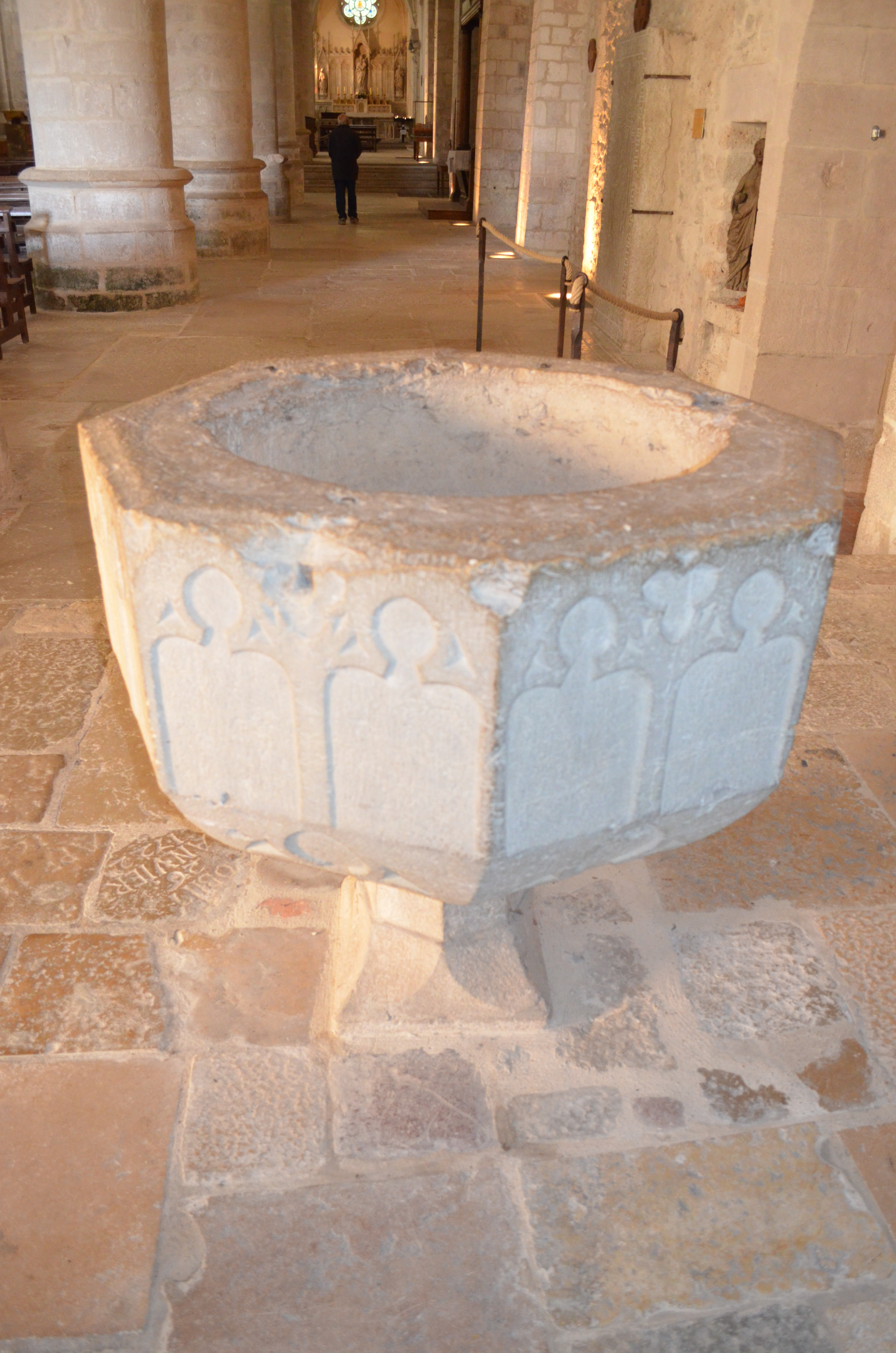
Baptismal Font in the Abbey

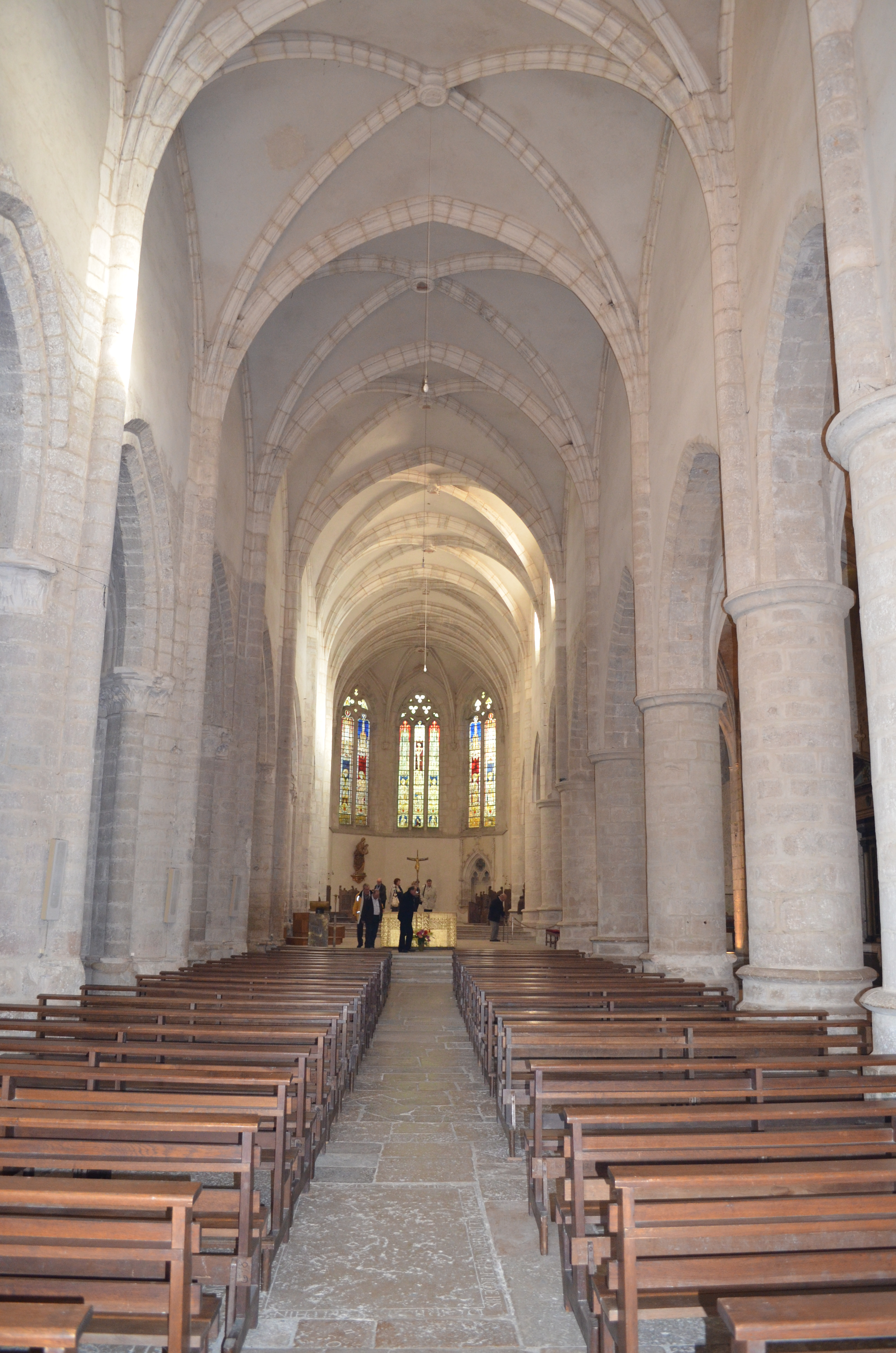
The Nave

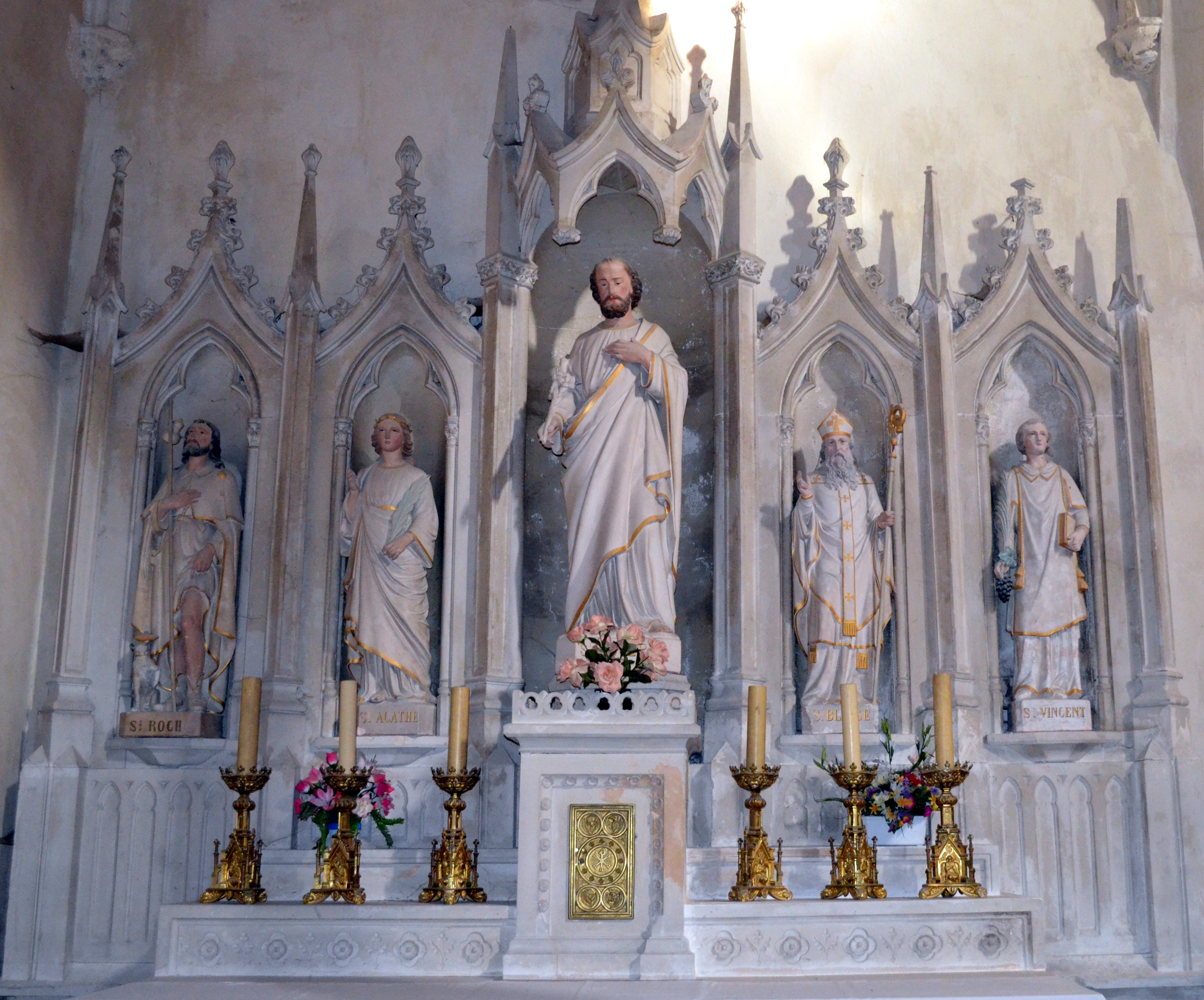
Interior of the Abbey

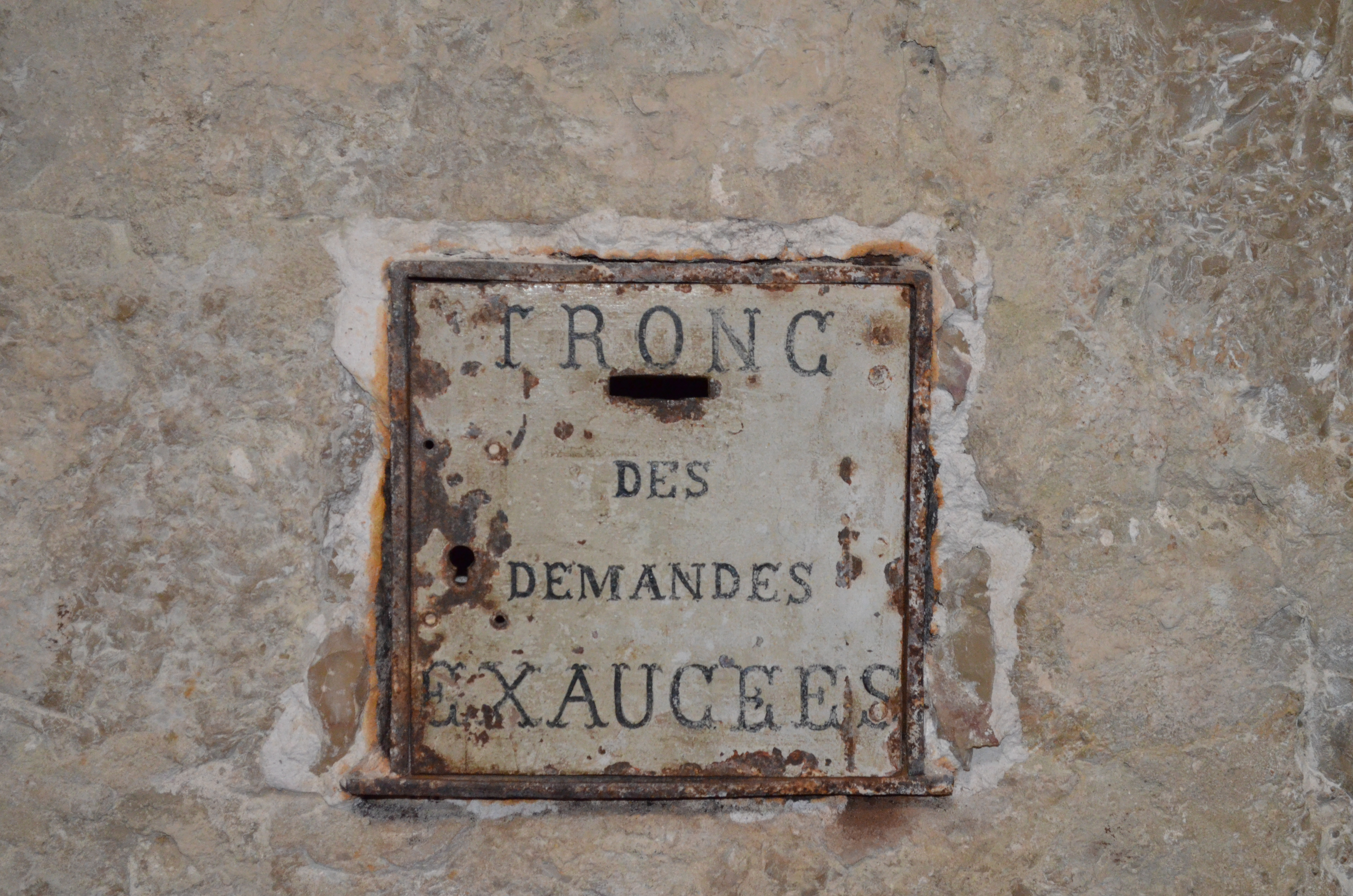
Detail in the interior of the Abbey

== Cultural events ==
Ambronay has been labelled as a Cultural Encounter Centre since 2003.

For students and young musicians, the European Baroque Academy offers master classes with many international projects and professional development.

For young people, Ambronay offers artistic and educational courses "a la carte" for, among other things, hosting cultural classes.

For amateurs, the Ambronay Festival brings together between thirty and forty renowned singers every year. Around its artistic reflection and its theme of "sacred music", the centre of research at Ambronay chooses to deploy researchers and designers in different directions working together to explore the social, intellectual, human, and artistic ramifications. Continuing its ambition to improve the employability of young musicians and researchers, Ambronay will expand its productions to enable the emerging talent of tomorrow.

Finally, the Ambronay Label has been distributed by Harmonia Mundi since 2005. With the support of institutional partners, a new phase of restoration and enhancement of its heritage is opening.

== Personalities ==
- Louis Tholon, inventor of the direct vision spectroscope, was born in the town in 1875.

== See also ==
- Communes of the Ain department
