= Boissieu =

Boissieu (or Boissieux) is a French proper name originating in middle and eastern France (Auvergne, Lyon, Alpes), probably meaning "woody place" ("bois" means wood in French).

== Families ==
Several French noble families bear the name Boissieu, including:

- The family de Boissieu or Boissieu du Forez, originally from Forez, near Lyon, in the 16th century
- The family Boissieu d'Auvergne or Boissieu de la Geneste, originating from La Chapelle-Geneste (Haute-Loire) in 1316
- The family Perrin de Boissieu or Boissieu-Perrin, later called Salvaing de Boissieu, originally from the Dauphiné. A line of this family later settled in Aunis (18th century) and Normandy (19th century).

== People ==
- Jean-Jacques de Boissieu (1736–1810), the French artist and engraver
- Henri Louis Augustin de Boissieu (1741–1795), French general
- Joseph Hugues Boissieu La Martinière (1758–1788), French doctor of medicine, botanist and biologist
- Claude Victor de Boissieu (1783–1868), the French artist and local politician
- Henri de Boissieu (1871–1912), French botanist, see Astilbe
- Alain de Boissieu (1914–2006), general son-in-law of the general Charles de Gaulle
- Pierre de Boissieu (born 1945), French diplomat and former French ambassador to the European Union
- Christian de Boissieu (born 1947), professor of economics at Paris I Panthéon-Sorbonne university
