= Suzanne Tenand =

French historian (1909–2005)

Suzanne Tenand (born on August 21, 1909 in Serrières-de-Briord; died on August 2, 2005 in Jujurieux in the Ain) is a journalist, historian and critic of French art.

After the Second World War, alongside her critical art activities, she became involved in the local history of the department of Ain, and especially in Bugey, in his native land. She devoted the last forty years of her life to the preservation of the Château des Allymes (a 14th-century medieval fortress) in Ambérieu-en-Bugey.

== Biography ==
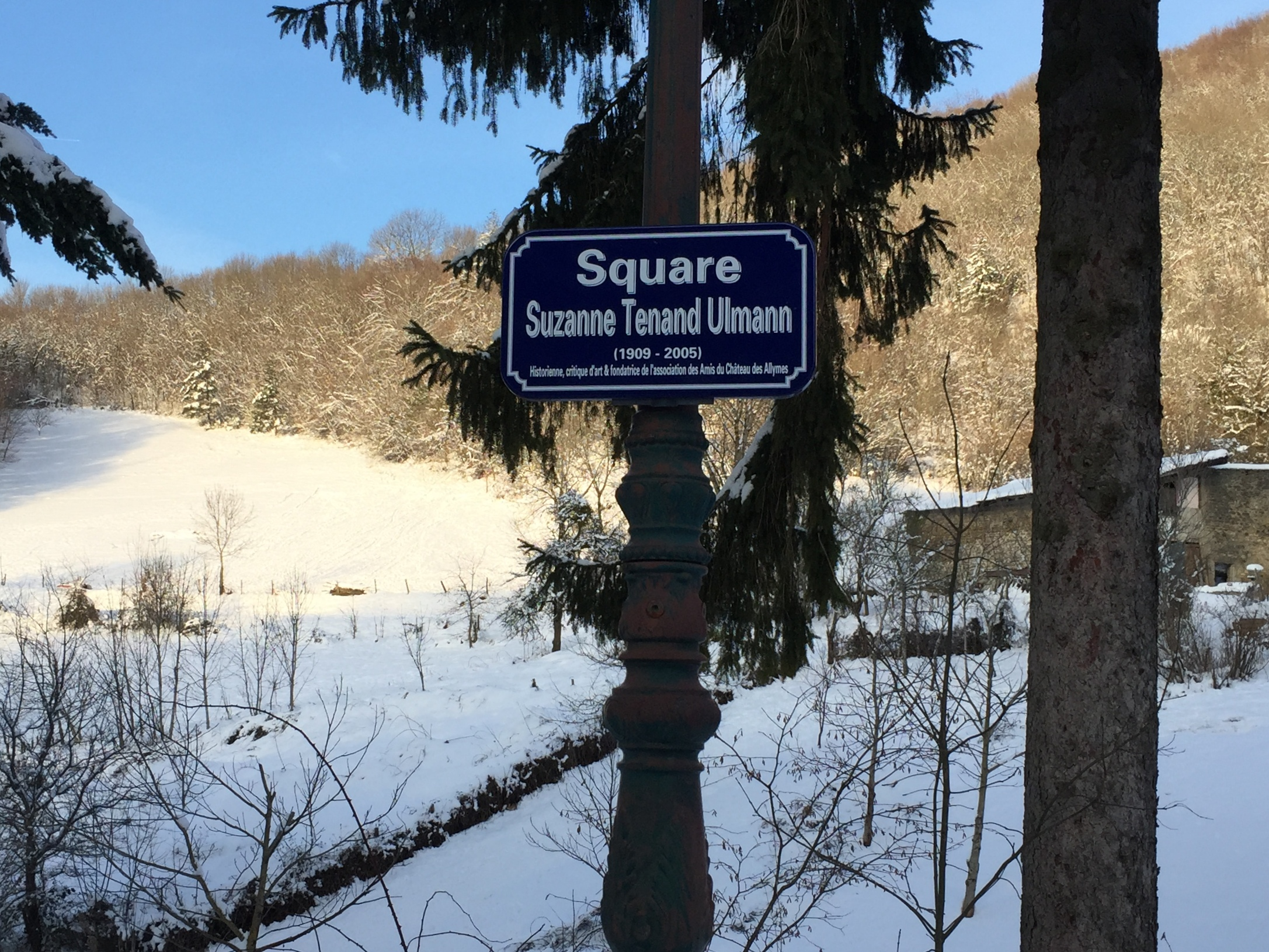
Square Suzanne-Tenand-Ulmann in Brey de Vent (Ambérieu-en-Bugey).

Suzanne Tenand attended the École du Louvre and the École pratique des hautes études, where she obtained a diploma in Egyptology. She participated in the anti-fascist movements of the 1930s and met André Ulmann, whom she married in December 1937. She left Paris in 1940 to move in with her son to the Allymes house.

In 1960, she founded, with Prince Jean-Louis de Faucigny-Lucinge, the Association "Friends of René de Lucinge and the Château des Allymes". Their aim was firstly to safeguard and preserve the seigneurial castle and to disseminate the work of the Prince and to have it recognized at its true value.

The following year, Suzanne Tenand-Ulmann gathered considerable documentation in a fictionalized biography dedicated to the lord of Allymes, René de Lucinge and the annexation of Bugey to France in 1601, which helped to make the writer better known. She would thus contribute to the periodic publication of archaeological, historical, and cultural articles of interest to regional history and works devoted to the lord of Allymes and his work.

After her husband's death, she was appointed mission officer by the Ministry of Foreign Affairs to the Center for Documentation and Studies of Ancient Egypt.

She created, with Michel Goldschmidt, the association Les Amis d’André Ulmann: this association published the book with a preface by Maurice Schumann, André Ulmann ou le juste combat, which pays tribute to the resistance fighter, deported to Mauthausen.

Suzanne Tenand-Ulmann made her house in Allymes available to her friend, the writer Roger Vailland, who lived there during the 1950s with his future wife Élisabeth. He was to write one of his most famous novels there, Beau Masque, the story of which is set nearby in the Albarine valley.
