= Alphonse de Cailleux =

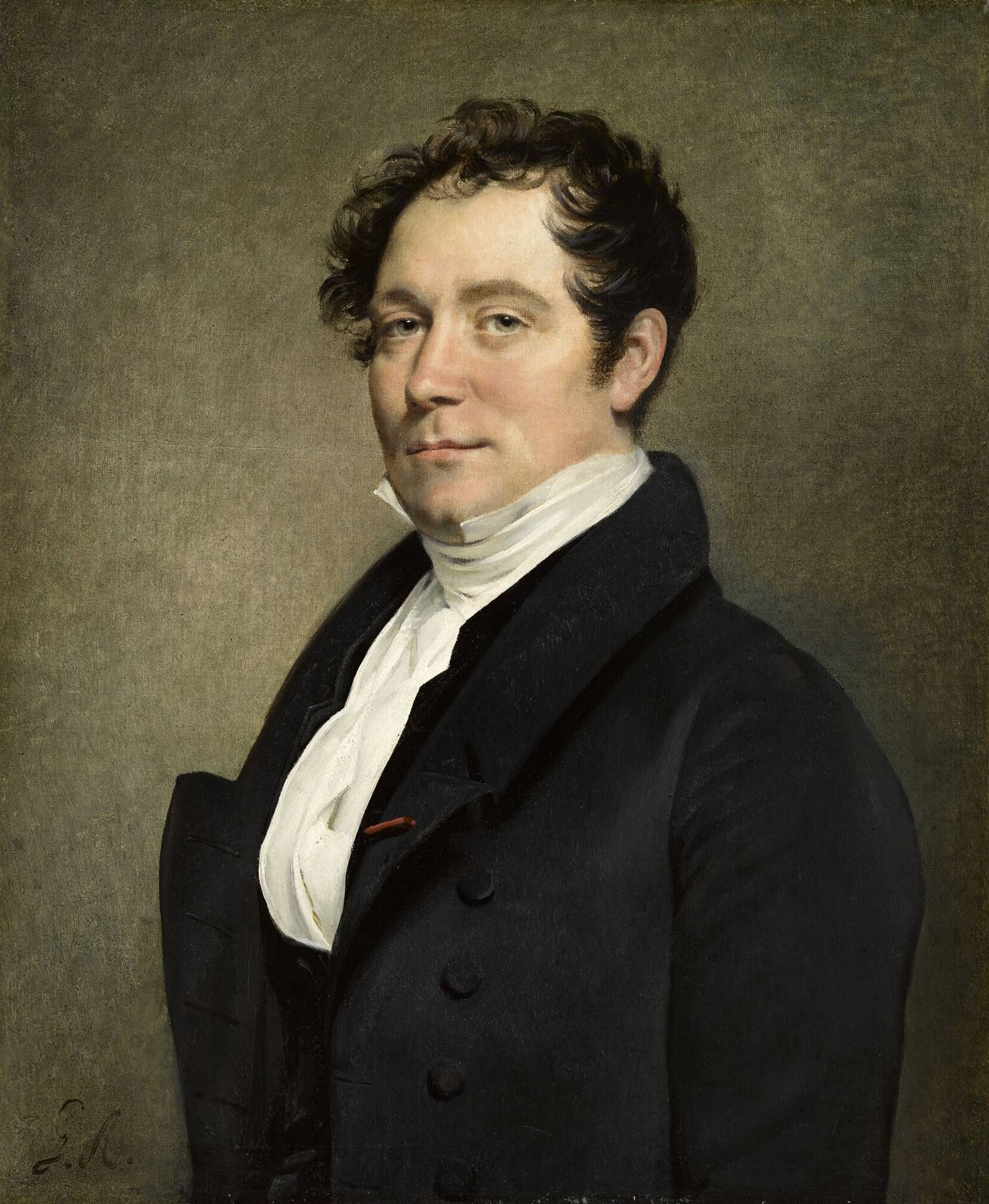
- Portrait by Georges Rouget, 1841–1848
- Born: Alexandre Achille Alphonse de Cailleux; 31 December 1788; Rouen, Kingdom of France
- Died: 24 May 1876 (aged 87); Paris, French Republic
- Occupation: Museum Director
- Awards: Legion of Honour - Knight Legion of Honour - Officer (1826)

Alphonse de Cailleux, in full Alexandre Achille Alphonse de Cailleux but numerous variations exist (31 December 1788 – 24 May 1876) was a French painter, curator and arts administrator who became director of the Musée du Louvre and all the royal museums of France. He was attached to the reconstituted royal household (maison du roi) under the Bourbon Restoration.

== Biography ==
Cailleux was born on 31 December 1788 in Rouen, Normandy. As secrétaire général des Musées royaux, he shared a carriage with Charles Nodier, Jean Alaux and Victor Hugo at the coronation of Charles X in 1825. In 1836, he was appointed directeur adjoint at the Louvre, where he assisted the increasingly debilitated Louis Nicolas Philippe Auguste de Forbin. Upon Forbin's death he was appointed directeur général des beaux-arts, a precursor of the position of Minister of Fine Arts.

In 1845, he was elected a membre libre (not being an artist himself) of the Académie des Beaux-Arts of the Institut de France. As the French Revolution of 1848 erupted and Louis Philippe abdicated in February 1848, Cailleux, a staunch royalist, resigned his posts. He died on 24 May 1876 in Paris, Île-de-France.

== Awards ==
He was a Knight of the Legion of Honour, but was promoted to Officer by decree on 17 May 1826. His portrait, attributed to Georges Rouget, is at the Musée de Versailles.
