= Saint-Uze culture =

Neolithic archaeological culture

Saint-Uze group
- Alternative names: Saint-Uze culture
- Geographical range: Western Switzerland, Valais, eastern France
- Period: Neolithic
- Dates: c. 4500–4250 BC
- Type site: Grotte du Gardon, Ambérieu-en-Bugey, Ain, France
- Major sites: Saint-Léonard - Sur-le-Grand-Pré

The Saint-Uze culture (or Saint-Uze group) is an archaeological culture that appeared in Western Switzerland, Valais, and eastern France during the second half of the 5th millennium BC (approximately 4500-4250 BC). The term Saint-Uze, introduced in 1997, groups together several cultural phenomena previously known under various names attributed to the Middle Neolithic I (Pre-Chasséen, Early Chasséen, Proto-Cortaillod, Early Cortaillod, Early Valaisan Cortaillod).

== Definition and chronology ==
The Saint-Uze style was defined on the basis of pottery found in layers 53 to 48 of the Grotte du Gardon at Ambérieu-en-Bugey, in the Ain department, France. Carbon-14 dating places these layers between approximately 4500 and 4200 BC. Regional differences are probable but difficult to determine due to the small number of finds. In Switzerland, only the complex of Saint-Léonard - Sur-le-Grand-Pré, important but likely chronologically heterogeneous, has been discovered to date.

== Material culture ==
=== Ceramics ===
Typical vessels of the Saint-Uze group include rounded jars with straight walls, ribbon handles below the rim, and sometimes knobs on the lip. Other characteristic forms are tall bowls with horizontally perforated handles featuring a slight central depression, and carinated bowls with rounded bases. Four-lobed rim bowls (Zipfelschalen) and vessels with pairs of handles are also found. Bottles, very common in the Egolzwil culture, are absent. The surface of the ceramics was not decorated but smoothed.

The barrel-shaped jars with rounded bases and ribbon handles are close to the Egolzwil-style ceramics of the central Swiss Plateau, although the Saint-Uze ribbon handles appear more flattened in cross-section. The typology of Saint-Uze ceramics compared to that of Egolzwil is notable for its greater variety.

=== Projectile points ===
The arrowheads of the Saint-Uze group are characterized by trapezoidal points, while those of the Egolzwil culture are triangular.

=== Burial practices ===
In the distribution area of Saint-Uze ceramics, the deceased were buried in cist tombs of the Chamblandes type. These are also present in the central Swiss Plateau in connection with the Egolzwil culture, although most necropolises of this type are found in the Lake Geneva region and Valais, in an intermediate zone between the areas of influence of these two cultures.

== Cultural connections ==
Despite regional differences (ceramics, arrowheads), Saint-Uze and Egolzwil appear to rest on a common southwestern substrate of Mediterranean origin. The greater typological variety of Saint-Uze ceramics and the differences in projectile point styles suggest distinct regional developments within a broader cultural framework.

== Bibliography ==
- Beeching, Alain; Nicod, Pierre-Yves et al.: «Le Saint-Uze, un style céramique non-chasséen du cinquième millénaire dans le bassin rhodanien», in: Constantin, Claude; Mordant, Daniel; Simonin, Daniel (éd.): La Culture de Cerny. Nouvelle économie, nouvelle société au Néolithique. Actes du colloque international de Nemours 9-10-11 mai 1994, 1997, pp. 575-592.
- Stöckli, Werner E.: Chronologie und Regionalität des jüngeren Neolithikums (4300-2400 v.Chr.) im Schweizer Mittelland, in Süddeutschland und in Ostfrankreich aufgrund der Keramik und der absoluten Datierungen, ausgehend von den Forschungen in den Feuchtbodensiedlungen der Schweiz, 2009.
- Voruz, Jean-Louis (dir.): La Grotte du Gardon (Ain), vol. 1: Le site et la séquence néolithique des couches 60 à 47, 2009.
- Denaire, Anthony; Doppler, Thomas et al.: «Espaces culturels, frontières et interactions au 5ème millénaire entre la plaine du Rhin supérieur et les rivages de la Méditerranée», in: Annuaire d'archéologie suisse, 94, 2011, pp. 21-59.
