= Ambérieu-en-Bugey =

Commune in Auvergne-Rhône-Alpes, France

Ambérieu-en-Bugey Ambèriô (Arpitan)
- Commune
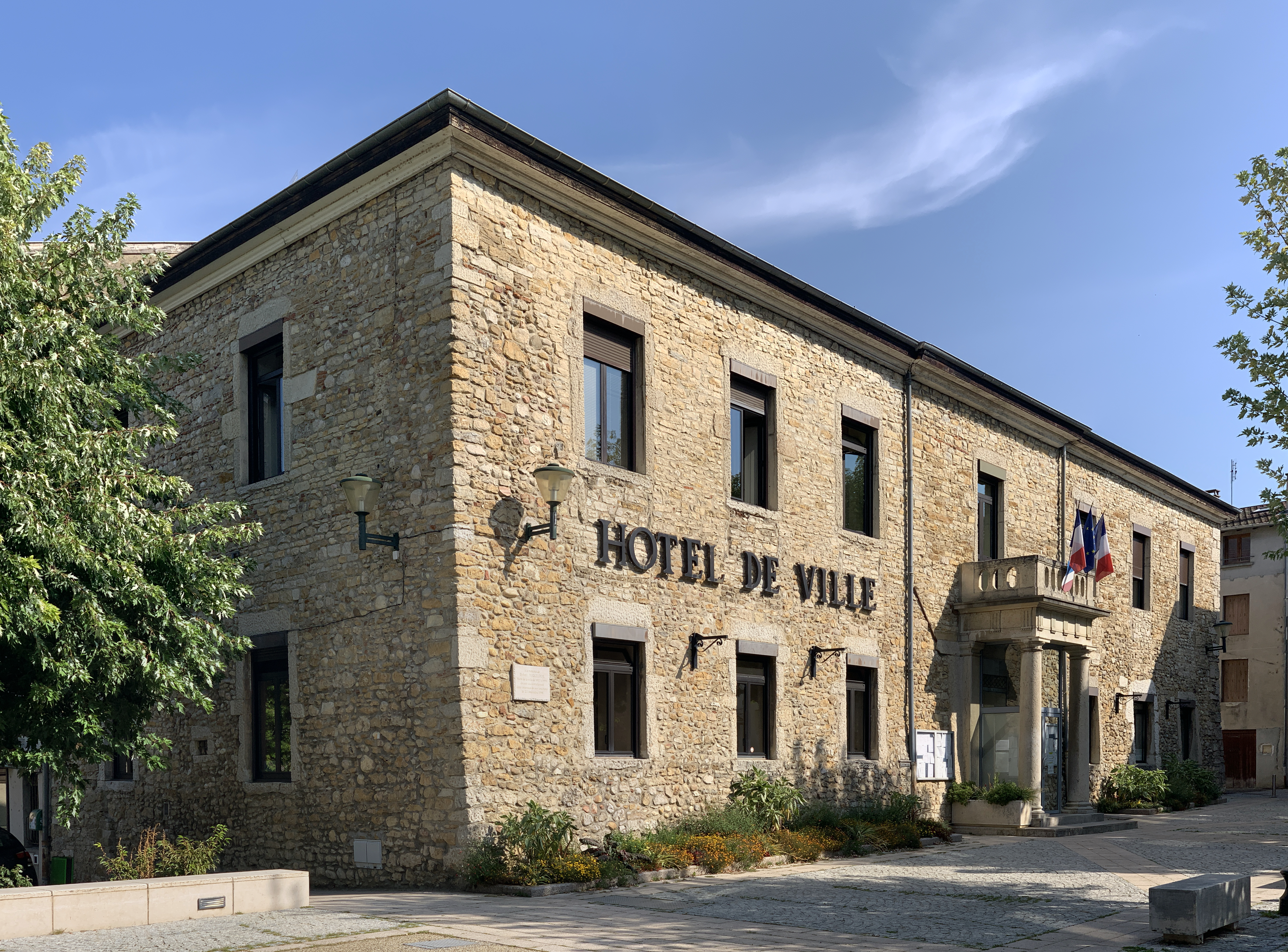
- Ambérieu-en-Bugey Town Hall

- Coat of arms
- Location of Ambérieu-en-Bugey
- Location within France Location within Auvergne-Rhône-Alpes
- Coordinates: 45°57′47″N 5°21′15″E
- Country: France
- Region: Auvergne-Rhône-Alpes
- Department: Ain
- Arrondissement: Belley
- Canton: Ambérieu-en-Bugey
- Intercommunality: Plaine de l'Ain

Government
  - Mayor (2026–32): Daniel Fabre
- Area^{1}: 24.6 km^{2} (9.5 sq mi)
- Elevation: 247 m (810 ft)
- Highest elevation: 753 m (2,470 ft)
- Lowest elevation: 237 m (778 ft)
- Population (2023): 15,934
  - Density: 648/km^{2} (1,680/sq mi)
- Demonym: Ambarrois
- Time zone: UTC+01:00 (CET)
  - Summer (DST): UTC+02:00 (CEST)
- INSEE/Postal code: 01004 /01500
- Website: ville-amberieuenbugey.fr
- ^{1} French Land Register data, which excludes lakes, ponds, glaciers > 1 km^{2} (0.386 sq mi or 247 acres) and river estuaries.

Ambérieu-en-Bugey (French pronunciation: [ɑ̃beʁjø ɑ̃ byʒɛ, byʒe]; Arpitan: Ambèriô) is a commune in the Ain department, Auvergne-Rhône-Alpes region, France. With 14,288 inhabitants (2020), it is one of the largest towns of the historical region of Bugey.

It is the largest town in the arrondissement of Belley and the seat of the canton of Ambérieu-en-Bugey which consists of 18 communes. Its urban area has 17,301 inhabitants (2020). The town was officially simply called Ambérieu until 31 March 1955 when it became Ambérieu-en-Bugey.

The town is known for being an important railway junction (around Ambérieu station), but also for winning the Croix de guerre 1939-1945 with citation at the Liberation.

== Geography ==
=== Location ===
Ambérieu-en-Bugey is 50 km northeast of Lyon, 30 km south of Bourg-en-Bresse, 73 km northwest of Aix-les-Bains, 76 km southeast of Mâcon and 104 km west of Geneva, Switzerland.

The town is in the commune's western part, on the right bank of the river Albarine, which forms most of the commune's southern border. It is surrounded by the communes of Saint-Denis-en-Bugey, and Bettant. Its expansion is due to demographic expansion with two new housing areas on the eastern side of the town where there is plenty of land (near Bettant).

Ambérieu-en-Bugey is located at the foot of the western foothills of the Jura Mountains of Bugey and opens onto the plain of Ain at the mouth of the gorge of Albarine.

=== Climate ===
Ambérieu features an "oceanic climate" (Cfb) under the Köppen system.

However, the city contains significant seasonal differences between the warm to hot summers and the cool to cold winters. Both temperatures above 30 °C (86 °F) for the summer months and winter air frosts are common.

Its record low of −26.9 °C (−16.4 °F) decisively indicates its continental influence, as well as its record high of 41.2 °C (106.2 °F).

Comparison of local Meteorological data with other cities in France
Town	Sunshine (hours/yr)	Rain (mm/yr)	Snow (days/yr)	Storm (days/yr)	Fog (days/yr)
National average	1,973	770	14	22	40
Ambérieu-en-Bugey	1,948.3	1,134.4	19	30	52
Paris	1,661	637	12	18	10
Nice	2,724	767	1	29	1
Strasbourg	1,693	665	29	29	56
Brest	1,605	1,211	7	12	75

Weather Data for Ambérieu-en-Bugey

Climate data for Ambérieu-en-Bugey (1991–2020 averages, extremes 1941–present)
Month	Jan	Feb	Mar	Apr	May	Jun	Jul	Aug	Sep	Oct	Nov	Dec	Year
Record high °C (°F)	18.7 (65.7)	22.9 (73.2)	26.6 (79.9)	29.7 (85.5)	34.4 (93.9)	38.1 (100.6)	40.2 (104.4)	41.2 (106.2)	35.4 (95.7)	29.9 (85.8)	23.2 (73.8)	21.3 (70.3)	41.2 (106.2)
Mean daily maximum °C (°F)	6.5 (43.7)	8.4 (47.1)	13.5 (56.3)	17.1 (62.8)	20.9 (69.6)	25.0 (77.0)	27.5 (81.5)	27.3 (81.1)	22.4 (72.3)	17.1 (62.8)	10.8 (51.4)	7.0 (44.6)	17.0 (62.6)
Daily mean °C (°F)	3.2 (37.8)	4.2 (39.6)	8.0 (46.4)	11.3 (52.3)	15.2 (59.4)	19.0 (66.2)	21.1 (70.0)	20.9 (69.6)	16.7 (62.1)	12.6 (54.7)	7.1 (44.8)	3.9 (39.0)	11.9 (53.4)
Mean daily minimum °C (°F)	−0.1 (31.8)	0.0 (32.0)	2.6 (36.7)	5.5 (41.9)	9.5 (49.1)	13.0 (55.4)	14.7 (58.5)	14.4 (57.9)	10.9 (51.6)	8.1 (46.6)	3.5 (38.3)	0.8 (33.4)	6.9 (44.4)
Record low °C (°F)	−26.9 (−16.4)	−20.8 (−5.4)	−15.5 (4.1)	−6.1 (21.0)	−3.3 (26.1)	1.3 (34.3)	3.6 (38.5)	3.0 (37.4)	−1.2 (29.8)	−7.2 (19.0)	−10.0 (14.0)	−17.3 (0.9)	−26.9 (−16.4)
Average precipitation mm (inches)	84.9 (3.34)	70.0 (2.76)	75.0 (2.95)	87.2 (3.43)	106.4 (4.19)	88.8 (3.50)	86.0 (3.39)	83.0 (3.27)	106.1 (4.18)	117.7 (4.63)	117.9 (4.64)	94.5 (3.72)	1,117.5 (44.00)
Average precipitation days (≥ 1.0 mm)	11.0	9.5	10.0	9.5	10.9	9.5	8.1	8.1	8.6	11.1	11.4	11.9	119.8
Mean monthly sunshine hours	67.9	98.4	170.0	193.6	220.3	251.9	287.8	261.1	188.9	121.6	72.8	54.9	1,989
Source 1: Météo-France
Source 2: Météociel, Ambérieu-en-Bugey

=== Topography and geology ===
The commune is at an altitude between 237 m and 753 m.

The sub-soil has been an important economic activity in the Ambérieu region in the 19th century until the first half of the 20th century. For example, the extraction of lignite (used in particular for heating) was an important activity in Ambérieu during the First World War.

Ambérieu-en-Bugey reflects the characteristics of Bugey in geological terms: the region is composed of a folded mountain relief, partly karstified, which is the southern extension of the Jura Mountains. The dating of the limestone of Bugey is between the Jurassic (for the anticlines) and the Cretaceous (for the synclines). The folds are easily visible in outcrops and cliffs.

=== Hydrography ===
There are several rivers in Ambérieu-en-Bugey. Besides the Albarine which flows through Ambérieu-en-Bugey, two streams which are themselves tributaries of the Albarine flow into the commune: the Seymard (15.5 km long and the Foulon (3.4 km long).

=== Channels of communication and transport ===
==== Rail ====
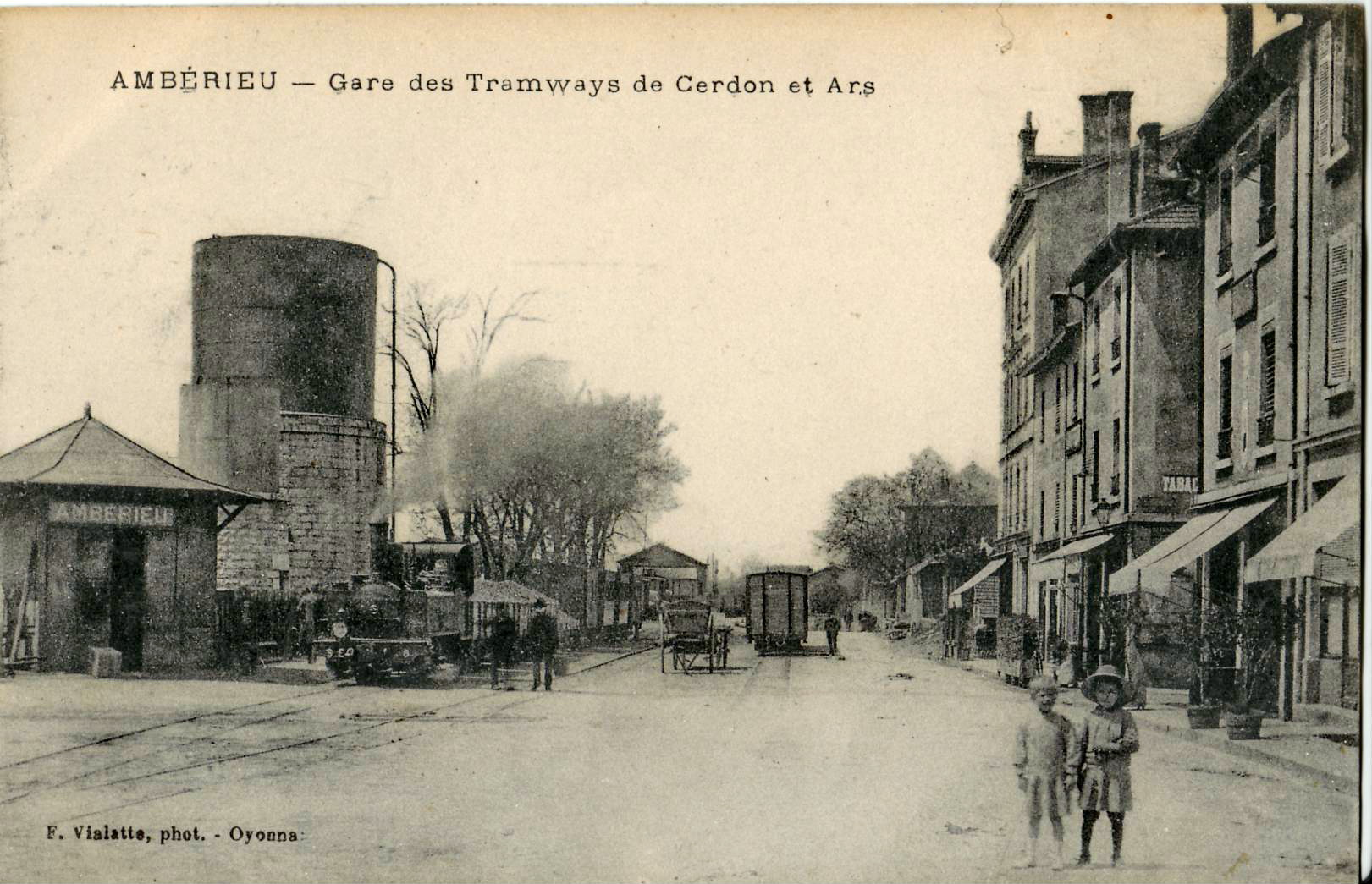
From 1897 to 1951 the town was served by the Tramways of Ain, a metric gauge light railway linking it to Cerdon and Ars-sur-Formans. Here can be seen the station.

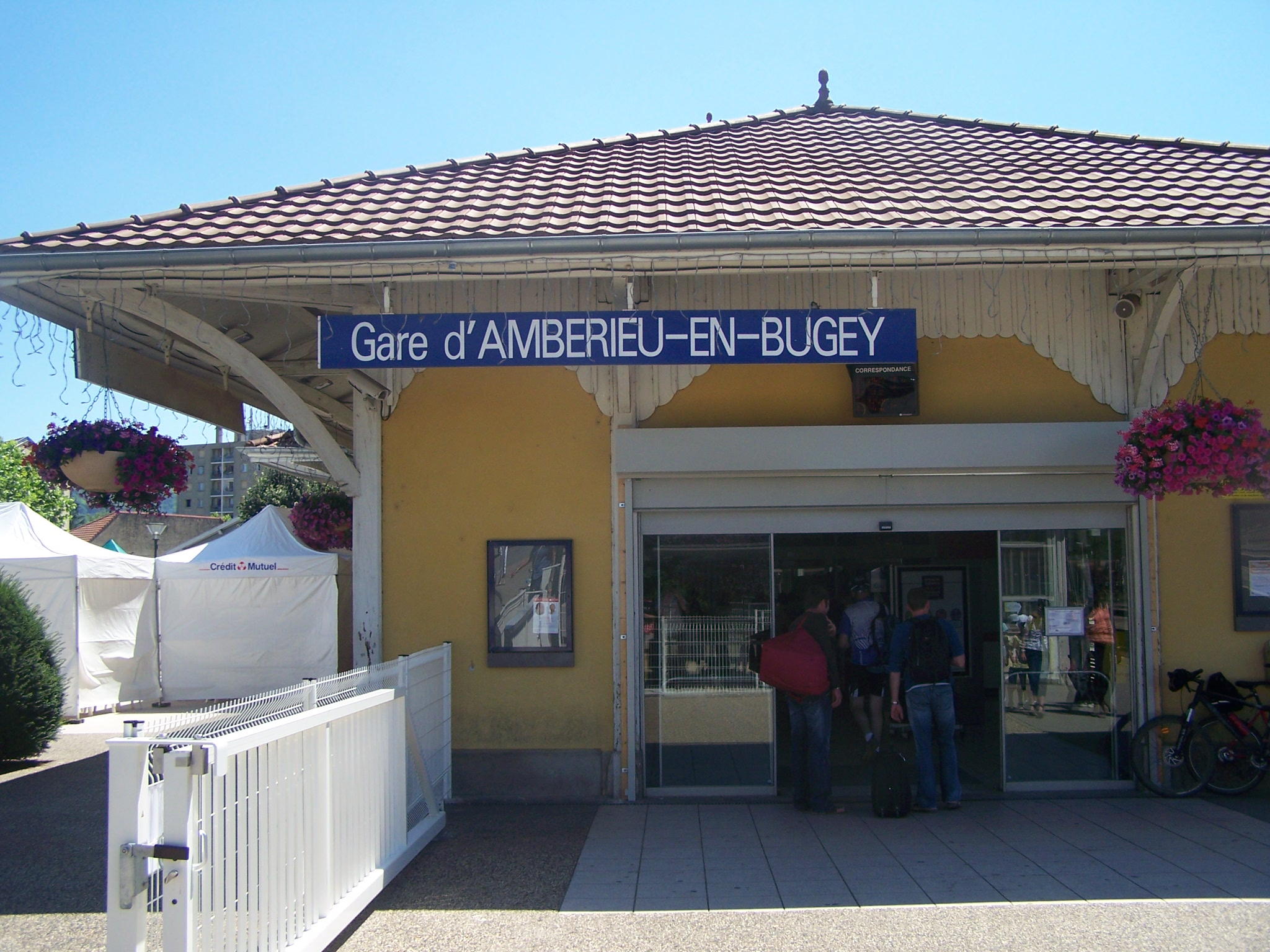
Entry to Ambérieu station.

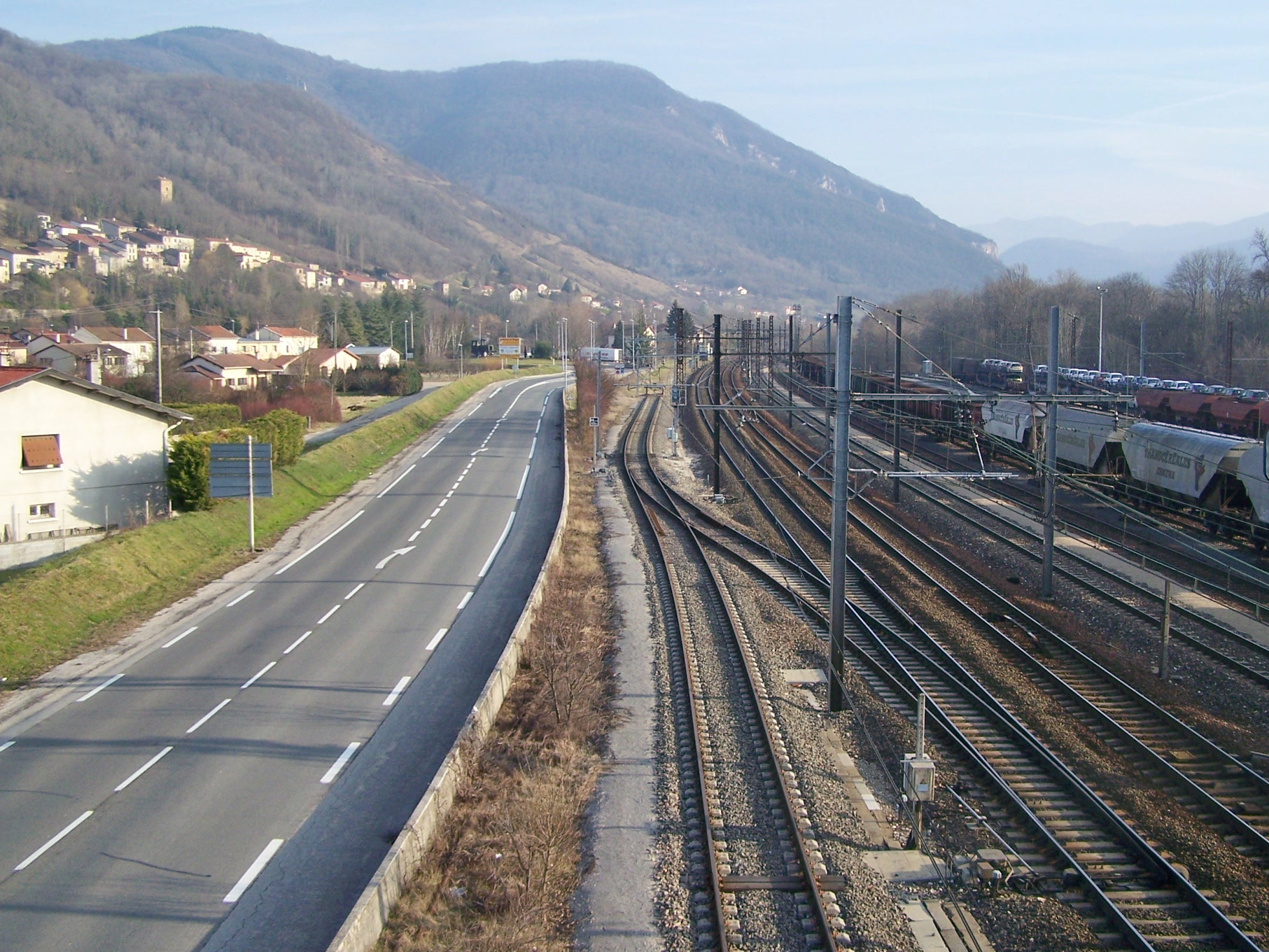
The D1504 road and the railway line from Lyon to Geneva

Ambérieu station is located at the junction of the Mâcon-Ambérieu line and the Lyon-Geneva line and is served by many TER trains to Lyon, Bourg-en-Bresse, Mâcon, Dijon, Besançon, Strasbourg, Culoz, Geneva, Aix-les-Bains, and Chambery.

==== Railway history ====
The railway has served the commune since 1856, making the town an important railway junction and the railway station, "one of the largest connection centres in France". Some lines which are now extinct (e.g. the Ambérieu-Montalieu-Vercieu line) created a great deal of rail activity at Ambérieu-en-Bugey; these activities have been illustrated in the collections of the Railway Museum since 1987.

In the 1930s the railway junction, sometimes called the "Ambérieu Star" had 247 locomotives stationed at the depot. The town then had about 6,500 inhabitants and the compagnie des chemins de fer de Paris à Lyon et à la Méditerranée employed about 2,150 railway workers.

On 7 June 1944 an operation was organized by resistance railway workers and maquisards to disable 52 locomotives and much other equipment. This action reduced the capacity of this strategic site and reduced the communications of the German army so avoiding bombing by the Allies on the site. A monument near the Ambérieu-en-Bugey station recalls this feat of arms.

==== Air transport ====
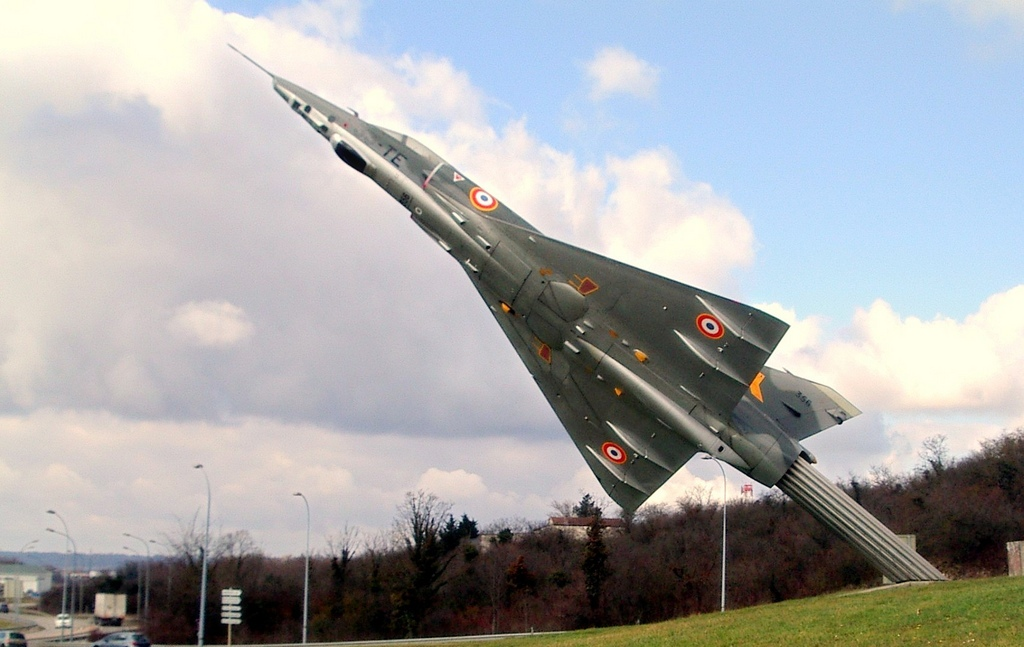
Representation of a Dassault Mirage III in Ambérieu-en-Bugey

Aerial activity has been present in Ambérieu-en-Bugey since the beginning of the 20th century. For example, Antoine de Saint-Exupéry made his first flight in July 1912 at the civil aerodrome of Bellievre.

Ambérieu-en-Bugey Air Base was built during the Second World War as a temporary airfield by the United States Air Force XII Engineer Command in August 1944. Named the "Colonel Chambonnet Base", today it is a supply and repair centre for electronic equipment aboard aircraft, ground communications detection equipment, navigation aids, and a manufacturing centre for simple equipment.

There is also a civilian aerodrome near Ambérieu-en-Bugey called the Ambérieu aerodrome but it is located in the neighbouring communes of Château-Gaillard and Ambronay.

==== Air history ====
Many flight schools have been located at Ambérieu-en-Bugey: the Bressane Aviation School, founded in 1909 by Mignot and Harding, which was associated with the Société Aérienne de Lyon-Bron. In 1912 it took the name Deperdussin-SPAD and was directed by the pilot René Vidart. There is also the Louis-Mouthier flight school which was opened in 1911. In 1915 the Military flight school of Ambérieu was established. Finally, in 1928, the Caudron flight school moved from Le Crotoy in the Somme to Ambérieu-en-Bugey. This school trained Jean Mermoz and René Fonck.

==== Road transport ====
The commune is traversed by the A42 autoroute. The exit for the commune is: No. 8 Ambérieu-en-Bugey in the direction of Geneva.

In addition, several departmental roads serve the commune: the D1075 (formerly National Highway 75) which connects Bourg-en-Bresse to Sisteron, the D1504 (the old national road 504) which connects Ambérieu-en-Bugey to the commune of Le Bourget-du-Lac, and the D904 (the old road known as the "Valley of the Saone").

In 2017 there were 6,403 households in Ambérieu-en-Bugey; 84.8% of households owned at least one car and 31.8% of all households had at least two cars.

==== Buses ====
Since 4 January 2010, a network of three bus lines has been established to replace the Ambar'bus service. The new network is called TAM (Transport Network Ambarrois) and links its timetables to the schedules of TER Auvergne-Rhône-Alpes. The network operates from 5:40 a.m. to 8:46 p.m. and carries 208 passengers per day.

=== Housing ===
In 2017 the total number of dwellings in the municipality was 7,217 (against 5,949 in 2007). Among these units, 88.7% were primary residences, second homes 1.7%, and 9.6% were vacant housing.

These units were split between 42.9% houses and 56.7% apartments. The proportion of residents owning their own homes was 42.7%.

=== Toponymy ===
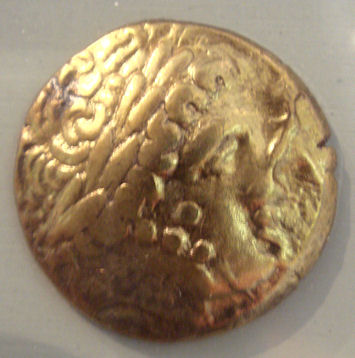
Gold coin of Ambarri, Gallic people occupied the territory of today's department of Ain and their name explains the toponym Ambérieu-en-Bugey

Ambérieu is mentioned in the form Ambariacus in 843 then Ambayreu in 1240.

The second element -acus represents a suffix of Gallic origin *-āko(n) which is usually written as acum in Latin. This is a locative suffix which later will designate villae in Gallo-Roman. It has generally evolved phonetically as -ieu in the region. The first element designates the Gauls ( Celtic people ) of Ambarri whose name meant "living on both (*amb) sides of the Saone (Arar, the Saône)" or was a Gallic anthroponym Ambarrius. Ambérieux-en-Dombes, Ambérieux, Ambérac, and Ambeyrac are similar topographical formations.

== History ==
=== Toponymy ===
The name Ambérieu derives from the Ambarri tribe who inhabited the modern day Ain department.

=== Antiquity ===
A number of archaeological discoveries relating to antiquity have been made in Ambérieu-en-Bugey:

- in 1839 or 1840 a child's sarcophagus was found in the commune;
- a document dated 1856 reports the discovery of numerous coins dating from the Roman Empire;
- the remains of a villa were unearthed in 1940 in the Saint-Germain district;
- in the same neighbourhood, in the area of the ruins of the castle of Saint-Germain, an archaeological level was uncovered which contained barbarian tombs and also a chapel dating from the Middle Ages.

=== Middle Ages ===
In the Middle Ages Ambérieu belonged to Bugey which, like Vaud, was acquired by Amadeus VI of Savoy, after signing the Treaty of Paris with France in 1355 which set the limits of the Duchy of Savoy and the Dauphiné. The city lay on the line of defence against France of the Duchy of Savoy. A series of fortifications were built to protect Savoy. Allymes Castle, the fortification of Brédevent, the Saint-Germain Castle, and the tower of Saint-Denis were parts of this line of defence in the Bugey possessions of the Duke of Savoy. Pérouges, a city of Savoy located on the plains played a commercial role at the border with France until the Treaty of Lyon.

=== Renaissance ===
Related article: Treaty of Lyon (1601).

On 17 January 1601 the Treaty of Lyon rejoined Bugey and therefore Ambérieu to France. This treaty between the Duke Charles Emmanuel I of Savoy and King Henry IV of France also unified France with Bresse, Bugey (at the time explicitly distinguished from Valromey), and the Pays de Gex.

=== World War II ===
==== Marcel Demia and the Resistance of Ain ====
In late 1941 Henri Romans-Petit was engaged in the French Hope network in Saint-Etienne. During Christmas an independent resistance fighter, Marcel Demia a Market gardener and Horticulturalist from the Ambérieu-en-Bugey commune went there to visit his parents. The two men meet and exchanged views on the situation. Their shared commitment motivated Henri Romans-Petit to create a Resistance organization in the department of Ain. Marcel Demia spoke of some young resistance fighters who he placed on isolated farms and the difficulties encountered in his organization. Henri Romans-Petit arrived in Ain in 1942 and began to help the resistance fighters of the STO and his host. Ambérieu-en-Bugey today has a street called Marcel Demia.

==== Liberation of the town ====
The town was liberated on 3 September 1944 by troops who landed in Provence. Known for the actions of its resistance, particularly from the Maquis de l'Ain et du Haut-Jura the town was nicknamed "The Rebel Ambérieu" and was decorated with the Croix de guerre 1939-1945 with citation.

=== New name ===
On 31 March 1955 Ambérieu was renamed Ambérieu-en-Bugey.

=== Heraldry ===
Arms of Ambérieu-en-Bugey	The status of the official emblem is to be determined. Blazon: Party per fess, the first counter compony Or and Azure; the second gules; over all a lion ermine..

== Politics and administration ==
The town has between 10,000 and 20,000 inhabitants and the town council is composed of 33 members: the mayor, nine deputies, and 23 councilors.

Since 2014, Daniel Fabre has been the mayor of Ambérieu-en-Bugey. He was re-elected in the 2020 municipal elections for the 2020-2026 tenure, and again in the 2026 Ain municipal elections.

List of successive mayors of Ambérieu-en-Bugey

From	To	Name	Party	Position
1852	1856	Claude Victor de Boissieu		Justice, General Counsel of Ain
1856	1860	Antoine Vicaire		Notary
1879	1884	Jules Pellaudin		
1884	1888	Clément Sapin		Trader
1888	1892	Henri Vicaire		Notary
1892	1896	Joseph Dojat-Ringuet		
1896	1910	Claude Aguétant		Notary
1910	1914	Jean-Louis Truchon		Doctor
1914	1919	Édouard Déléaz		
1919	1934	Émile Bravet	PRS	
1934	1935	Louis Vachez		
1935	1941	Émile Bravet	PRS	MP
1941 (Note: Named by préfectoral order.)	1944	Théodore Tiller		Cafe Owner
1944	1965	Léon Tournier-Billon	SFIO	
1965	1971	Paul Combier		
1971	1977	Antoine Buy	DVG	
1977	1991	Robert Marcelpoil (Note: Died accidentally on 22 December 1991.)	DVD	
1992	1995	Gilles Bolliet	DVD	
1995	2008	Gilles Piralla	DVD	
2008	2014	Josiane Exposito	PS	Regional Councilor
2014	Incumbent	Daniel Fabre	UDI	

=== Political environment ===
The commune, at the instigation of Saint-Vulbas and Pérouges has been experimenting with a weed control plan that does not involve the use of chemicals

=== Air quality ===
An integral part of the Community of communes of the plain of Ain, Ambérieu-en-Bugey commune participates in actions such as air quality control as quality is potentially undermined by the proximity of the industrial park of the Plain of Ain.

=== Shale gas ===
The geological sub-structure of the Ambérieu-en-Bugey region contains Shale gas. The potential exploitation of these deposits has caused some hostility which has been expressed in local politics. Advocacy undertaken by opposition movements are varied: broadcasts, a documentary called Gasland - in June 2011, and demonstrations at Blyes the main town in the region concerned.

== Twin towns – sister cities ==
Ambérieu-en-Bugey is twinned with:

- Mering, Germany (1973)

== Population and society ==
=== Population ===
Its inhabitants are known as Ambarrois (masculine) and Ambarroises (feminine) in French.

Historical population

Year	Pop.	±% p.a.
1793	2,915	—
1800	2,850	−0.32%
1806	2,892	+0.24%
1821	2,657	−0.56%
1831	2,647	−0.04%
1836	2,800	+1.13%
1841	2,677	−0.89%
1846	2,521	−1.19%
1851	2,458	−0.50%
1856	2,472	+0.11%
1861	2,782	+2.39%
1866	3,047	+1.84%
1872	2,954	−0.52%
1876	3,427	+3.78%
1881	3,396	−0.18%
1886	3,618	+1.27%
1891	3,635	+0.09%
1896	3,548	−0.48%
1901	4,023	+2.54%

Year	Pop.	±% p.a.
1906	4,100	+0.38%
1911	4,334	+1.12%
1921	4,796	+1.02%
1926	5,705	+3.53%
1931	6,794	+3.56%
1936	6,846	+0.15%
1946	7,142	+0.42%
1954	7,159	+0.03%
1962	7,748	+0.99%
1968	8,949	+2.43%
1975	9,550	+0.93%
1982	9,737	+0.28%
1990	10,455	+0.89%
1999	11,436	+1.00%
2007	12,696	+1.32%
2012	14,233	+2.31%
2017	14,035	−0.28%
2023	15,934	+2.14%

Source: EHESS (1793–1999) and INSEE

=== Distribution of age groups ===
The population of the town is slightly younger than the departmental average.

Population by age of Ambérieu-en-Bugey, 2023 (%)

80+	5.1
65–79	12.4
55–64	11.4
40–54	17.7
25–39	20.7
15–24	13.1
0–14	19.5

Total: 99.9

male

female

Source: INSEE

Population by age of Ain, 2023 (%)

90+	5.2
75–89	13.8
60–74	12.7
45–59	20.5
30–44	18.4
15–29	10.4
0–14	19.1

Total: 100.1

male

female

Source: INSEE

=== Education ===
==== Public education ====
Ambérieu-en-Bugey is located in the Academy of Lyon area. The town administers several kindergartens and communal elementary schools.

List of public schools

Type	Public school
Kindergarten and primary	(*) Jules-Ferry; Jean-de-Paris*; Jean-Jaurès
College	Antoine-de-Saint-Exupéry
High school	Lycée professionnel Alexandre-Bérard Lycée général de la Plaine de l'Ain (Note: The school is nicknamed Solar School because of the solar panels which cover the roof. On 10 March 2006 a mini-tornado moved and overturned many vehicles and slightly damaged the school however without any injuries.)

* Solely kindergarten.

==== Private education ====
The Sainte-Marie school brings together a kindergarten, a primary school, and a college.

==== Other education ====
A GRETA - an organization specialising in continuing education for adults - is based in Ambérieu-en-Bugey. A Bernard Palissy training centre for apprentices is also based in the commune.

=== Cultural events and festivals ===
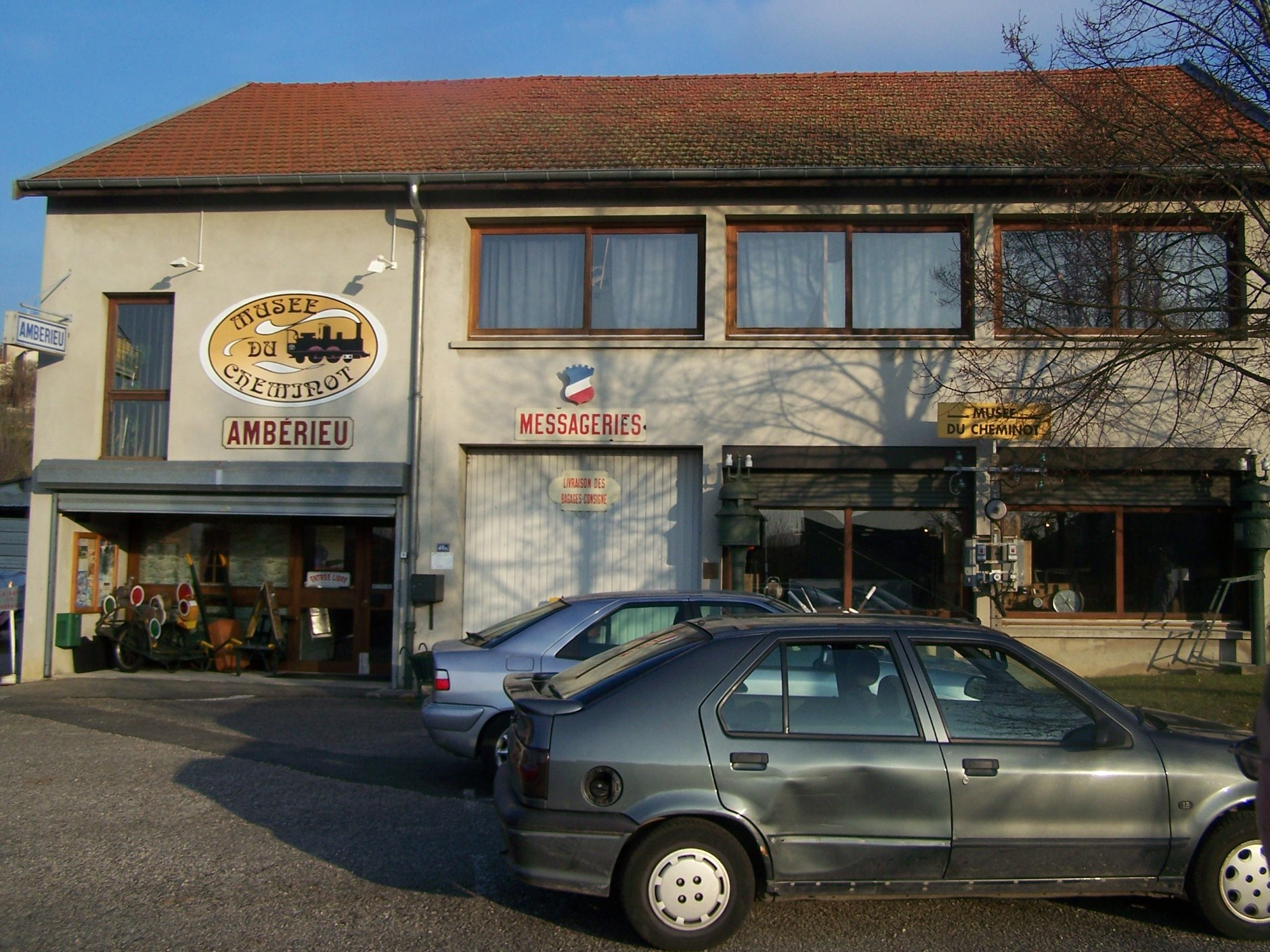
The Railway Museum

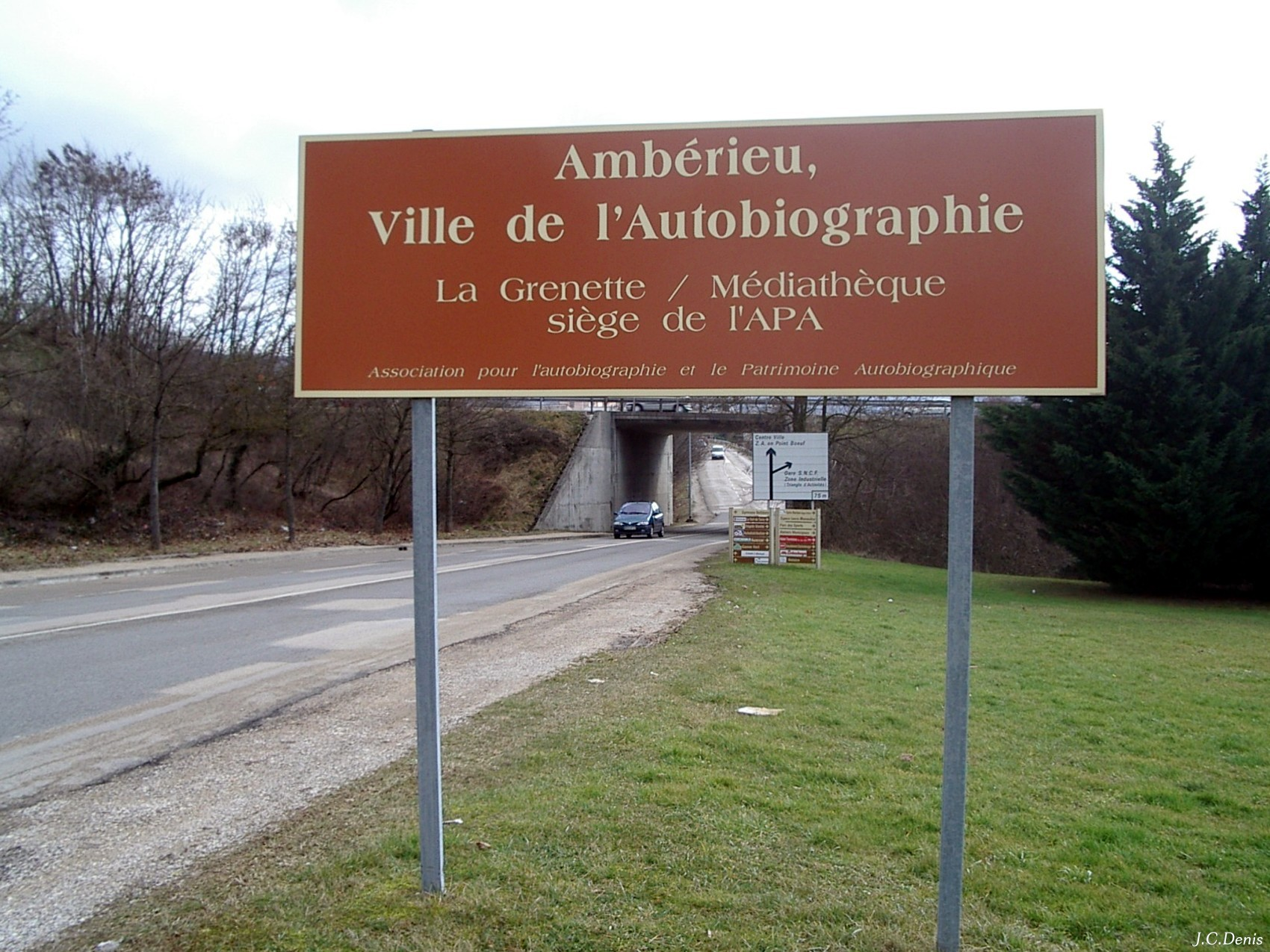
Sign "Town of autobiography"

In addition to the railway, as shown by the creation of the Railway Museum railway in 1987, Ambérieu-en-Bugey also developed around its library with an interest in autobiographical heritage including hosting the headquarters of the Association For Autobiography (APA). In addition, the town has provided a house for associations.

There have been two notable events in the town:

The first, the festival Jazz in the Park was a festival of jazz that took place in the Parc des Échelles in July. The 13th and last edition was held in 2006.

The second, the Salon du Gourmet is held each year in November with dozens of exhibitors from all over France to show their crafts. The Association for autobiography and autobiographical heritage located in Ambérieu-en-Bugey also organizes ad hoc cultural events.

=== Health ===
Several medical centres are based in Ambérieu-en-Bugey: other than the mutual clinic there is a maternity unit in the town, a medical practice at Allymes, the Paul-Mourlon centre for early medico-social action, and the specialized home care service also named Paul-Mourlon.

=== Sports ===
==== Infrastructure ====
The town has several sports facilities: the Cordier, Bellievre, Saint-Exupéry, and Plaine de l'Ain gyms. There is also a nautical centre called Laure Manaudou, the Theo-Tillier (Note: The stadium bears the name of the Mayor who succeeded Émile Bravet in 1940.) stadium, and the skatepark.

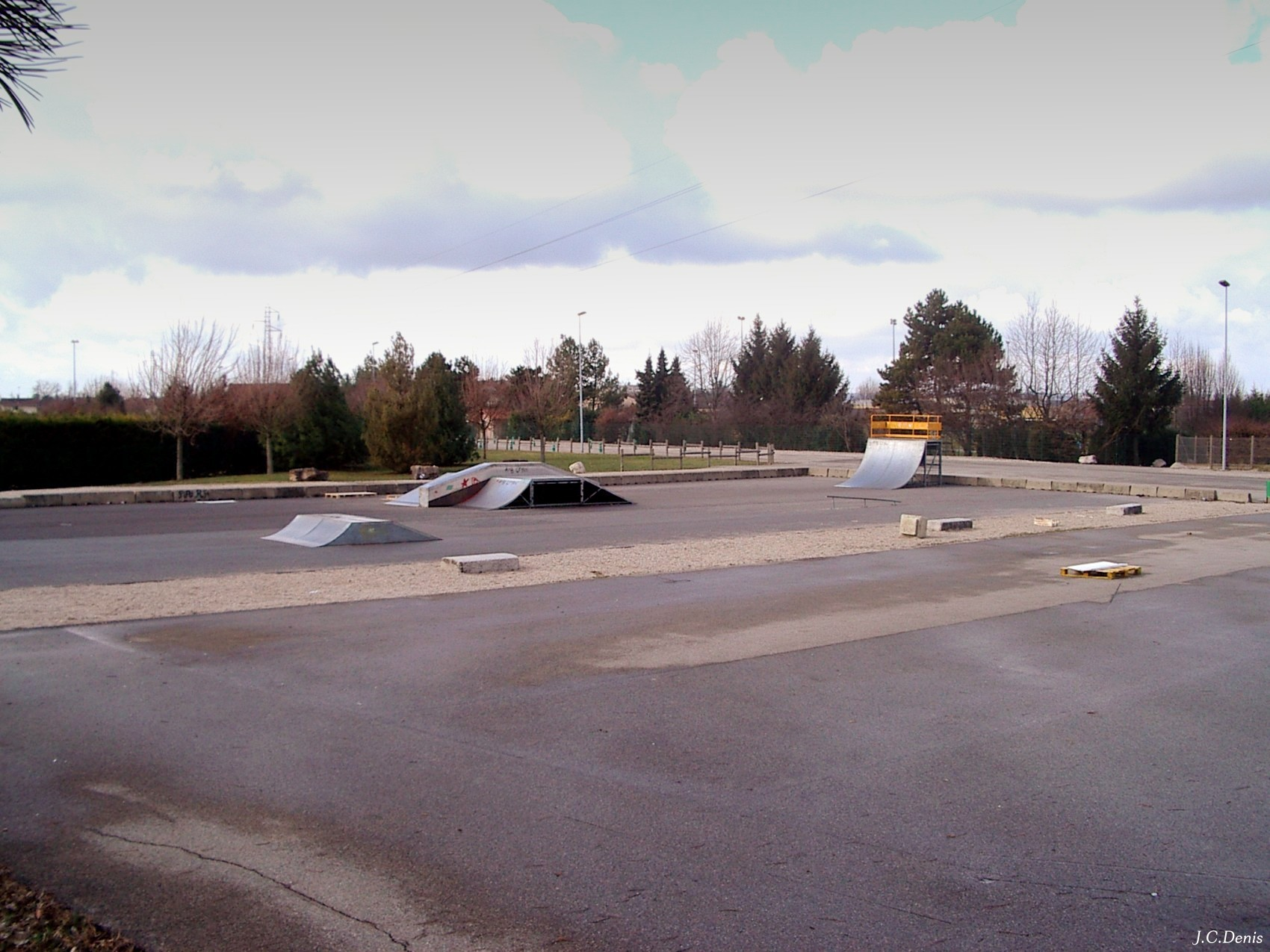
Ambérieu-en-Bugey Skatepark

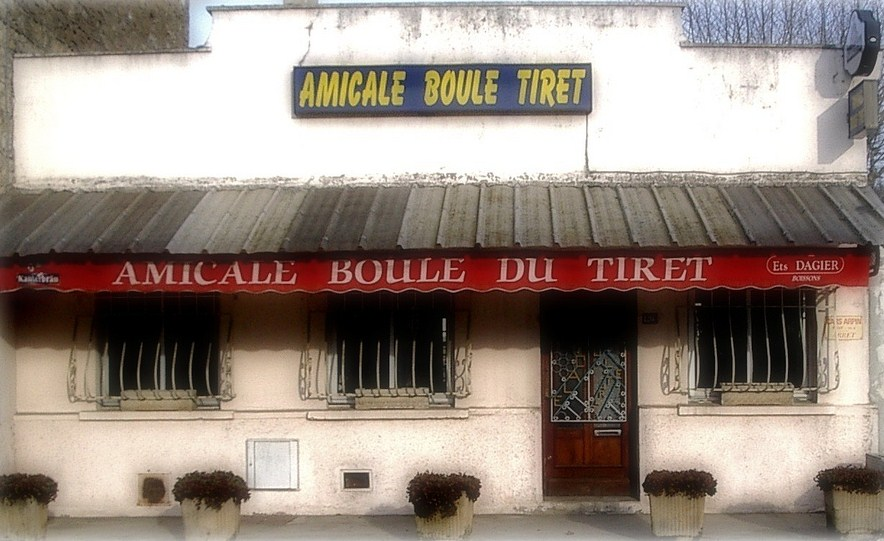
Friendly bowls at Tiret

List of sports associations in Ambérieu-en-Bugey in 2011

- Club Aéronautique du Bugey
- Ambérieu Karate Club
- Judo Kodokan Ambérieu
- Cercle de jade - tai chi
- Académie de Taekwondo et Olympique Ambérieu
- Ambérieu Athlétic Club
- Ambérieu Marathon
- Fous du Volant Ambarrois
- Ambérieu Basket Ball
- ASCA Boules
- Boule de Tiret
- Boule du Gardon
- Secteur Bouliste Plaine de l'Ain
- Amicale Chasse
- Groupement des pêcheurs sportifs
- Pêcheurs à la Ligne de l'Ain
- Vélo Club d'Ambérieu
- Ambar'rock
- Alegria
- Cercle d'échec
- ASC Ambérieu escrime
- Ambérieu Football Club
- Gym Aquatique et Grossesse
- ALJF Gymnastique sportive
- ASC Ambérieu Gym d'entretien
- Handball Club Ambérieu
- Moto Club d'Ambérieu
- Ambérieu Natation
- Color's Paintball
- ASC Ambérieu Pétanque
- Sportif Ambarrois de Plongée et de Spéléologie
- Club Aquatique Subaquatique Ambarrois
- Club Spéléo Canyon Ambarrois
- Ambérieu Rugby Club
- Ski Club Régional de l'Ain
- ALJF gym d'entretien
- Savate forme
- Racing Team Ambarrois
- Tout Terrain Ambarrois
- AinTerr'Actif 4x4
- Club Ambarrois de Tennis
- ASC Ambérieu Tennis de Table
- Tir Sportif du Bugey
- Compagnie des Archers Bugistes
- Compagnie des Archers du Roy
- Triathlon Ambérieu
- Ambérieu Volley Ball
- Association de yoga d'Ambérieu

=== Media ===
==== Printing press ====
The newspaper le Progrès offers a daily edition dedicated to the region of Bugey. Voix de l'Ain is a weekly publication offering local information for different regions of the department. Le Journal du Bugey is a weekly publication more focused on information for the Ambérieu-en-Bugey area and its surroundings.

==== Television ====
France 3 Rhône-Alpes Auvergne' is available in the region.

==== Radio ====
A local radio station broadcasts the Fréquence Côtière from Montluel. Since the 2000s, the name has evolved into the station FC radio, the essential.

=== Religion ===
==== Catholic worship ====
There are six churches for Catholic worship in the parish of Ambérieu-en-Bugey: Saint Symphorien, Saint Jean-Marie Vianney, Notre Dame des Neiges, Sainte Foy, Saint Maurice, and Saint Denis. This parish is in the parish grouping of "Ambérieu-en-Bugey" which depends on the diocese of Belley-Ars in the Archdiocese of Lyon.

==== Protestant worship ====
An evangelical Protestant church is located at 31 rue de la Resistance.

==== Muslim worship ====
Two prayer halls of the Muslim Faith are located in Ambérieu-en-Bugey: the first is for the Union of Maghreb people of Ain and is located on the rue de la Resistance. The second is run by the Union of Muslim Associations for the Lyon Area and is located on Avenue Paul Painlevé. A building permit has been approved by the town council to build a mosque

==== Freemasonry ====
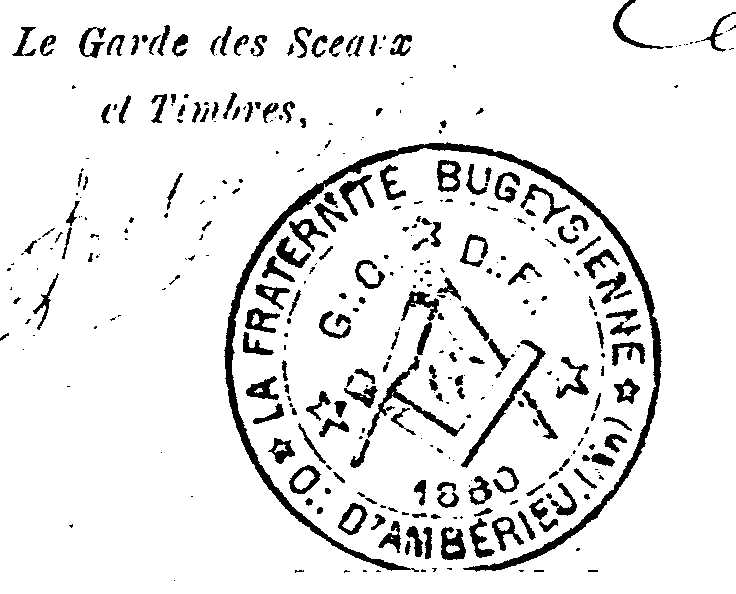
Stamp of the Masonic Lodge

A Masonic lodge, the Brotherhood bugeysienne is based in Ambérieu-en-Bugey. They also have a Masonic temple in the commune of Saint-Denis-en-Bugey. It is affiliated to the Grand Orient of France.

== Economy ==
=== Incomes of the population and tax ===
In 2017 according to the INSEE survey, the median net income per household was €19,860 per year. 49% of the commune's households were then taxable.

=== Employment ===
In 2017 the population of Ambérieu-en-Bugey aged between 15 and 64 was distributed as follows: 76.2% of active people, 11.3% unemployed, 9.5% student or trainee, and 6.1% of retirees.

An employment centre is located in the town.

Distribution of employees by zone of activity in 2017
	Agricultural	Craftsmen, shopkeepers, business owners	Professionals and intellectuals	Intermediate professions	Employees	Workers
Ambérieu-en-Bugey	0.1%	5.1%	11.9%	29.0%	30.1%	23.8%
Source: INSEE

=== Businesses and shops ===
At 31 December 2015, Ambérieu-en-Bugey had 1,337 business establishments: 52 were specialized in industrial activity, 131 in construction, 907 in trade, 7 in agriculture, and 142 were in public administration, education, health and social work.

In 2018, 114 new companies were established in the territory of which 80 are under the auto-entrepreneur rules.

== Culture and heritage ==
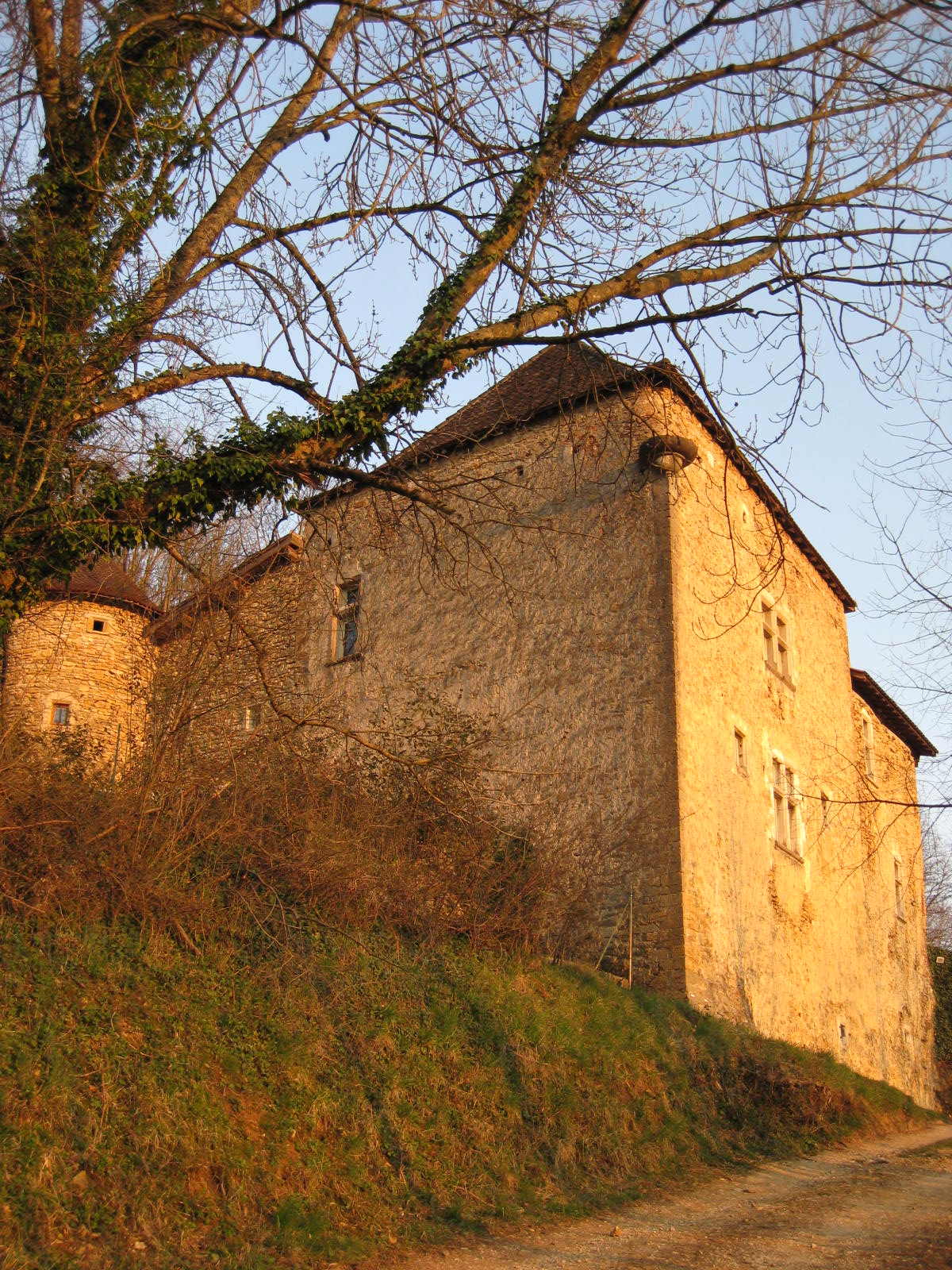
The Gy Tower

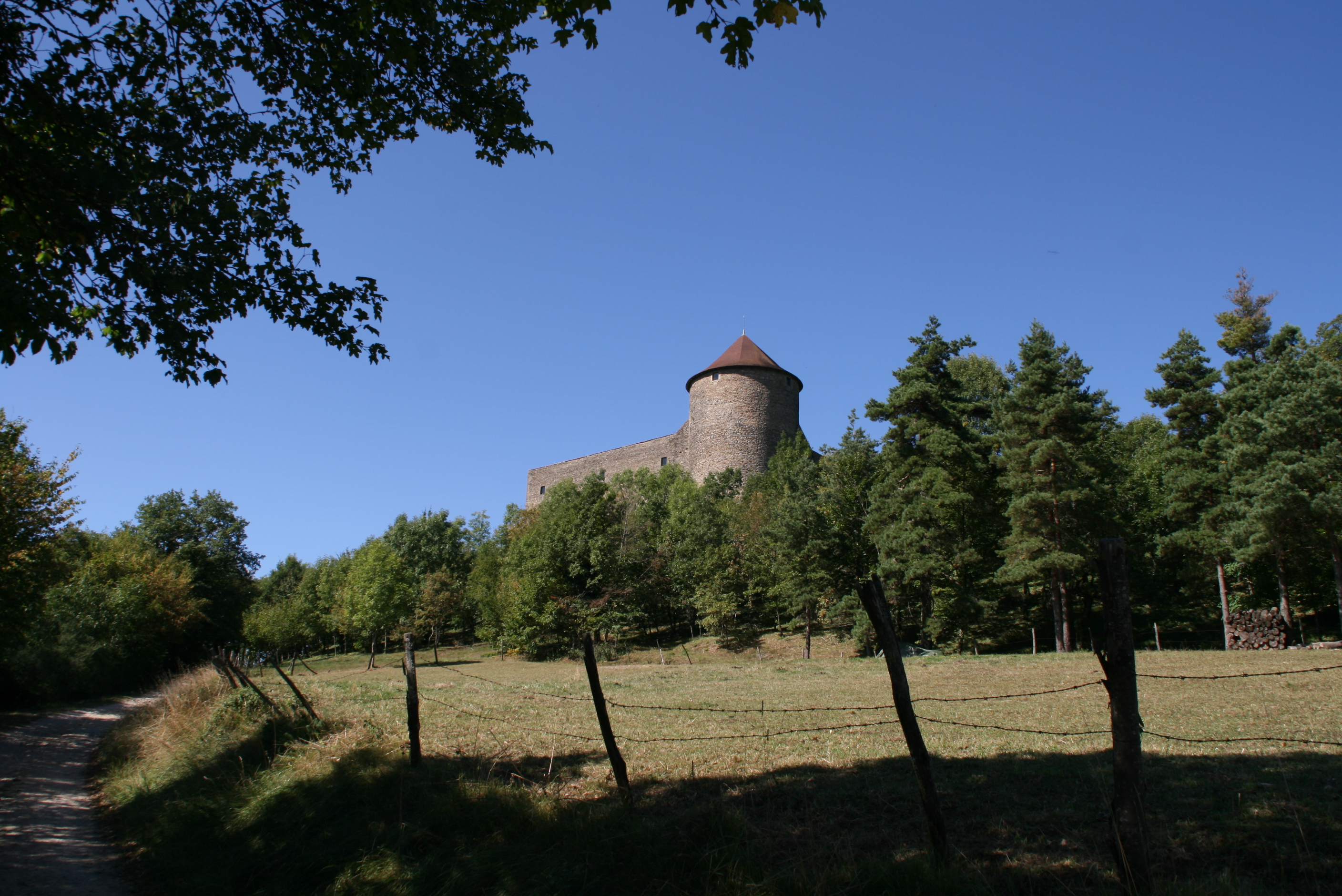
Château des Allymes

=== Civil monuments ===
There are three sites in the commune that are registered as historical monuments:

- The Tour de Gy Fortified house of Saint Germain (14th century), including the tower, fireplace and spiral staircase.
- The Gothic Château des Allymes (1351) mainly built by François Nicod.

Other sites of interest

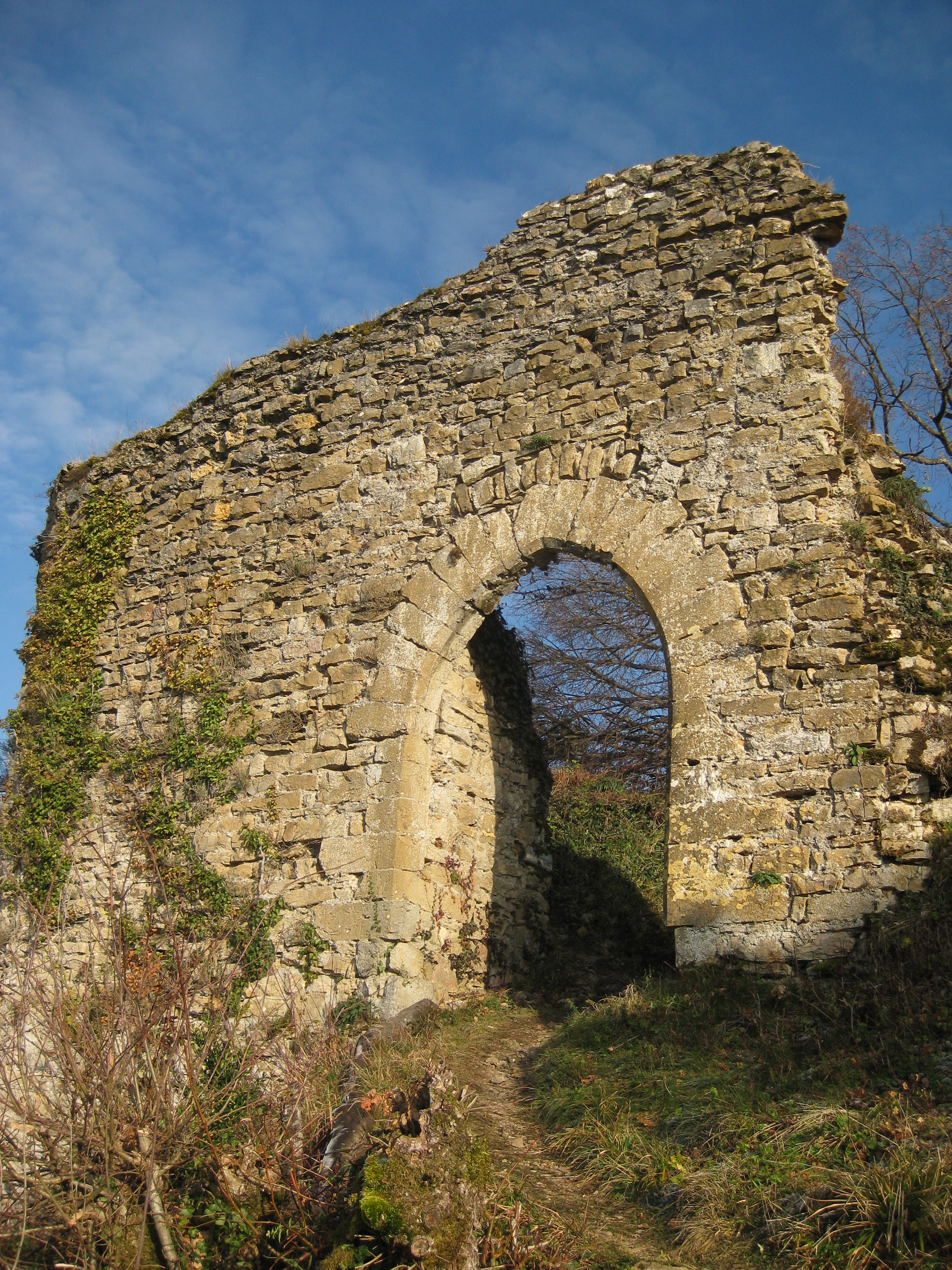
Gothic gate of the castle of Saint-Germain

- The Château des Echelles (19th century) in the Vareille district.
- The remains of the Chateau of Saint-Germain, a medieval castle which overlooked the Tour de Gy

=== Religious monuments ===
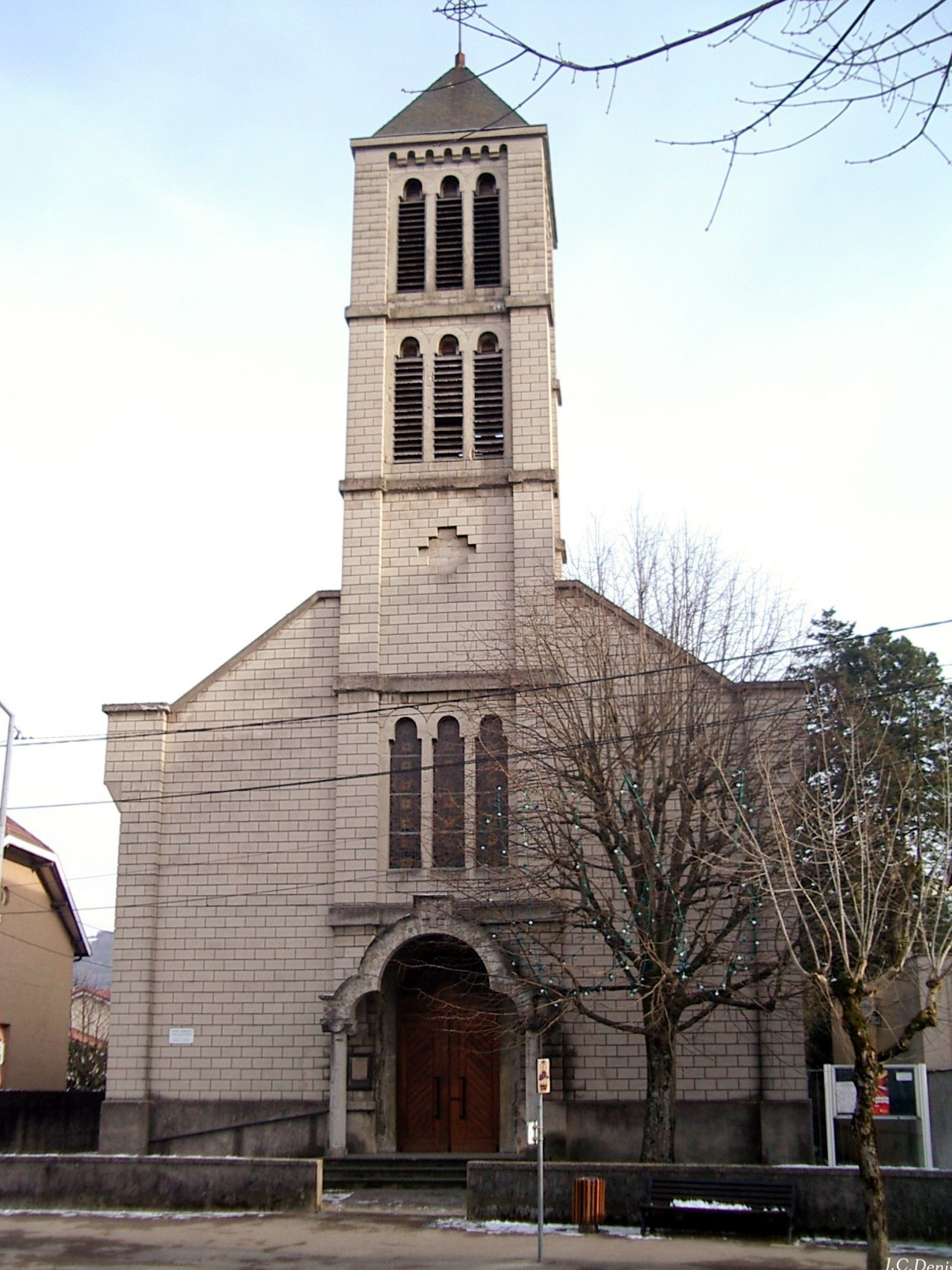
The church of Saint-Jean-Marie-Vianney

- The Chapel of Our Lady of the Coast (18th century) at Saint-Germain. The Chapel contains two items which are registered as historical objects:
  - A polychrome wooden Retable (16th century) depicting scenes from the life of the Blessed Virgin in 7 panels
  - A Painting: Virgin of the Rosary with several Saints (1606)
- The Chapel of Allymes
- The Church of Saint-Symphorien (19th century) in the town centre.
- The Church dedicated to Saint Jean-Marie Vianney (20th century) in the railway station district.
- The Temple of the Reformed Church, in the Place Marcelpoil.

=== Environmental heritage ===
The commune has several parks:

- The Blue Lake in the Vareilles district;
- The Château des Echelles Park is ranked as a Remarkable Garden of France where the Jazz in the Park festival used to be held each year;
- The Parc du Grand Dunois

Ambérieu-en-Bugey was awarded one flower in the Concours des villes et villages fleuris (Competition for Towns and Villages in bloom) competition in 2005 and second in 2008. In 2014 the commune was awarded two flowers.

=== In popular culture ===
Several films were partially shot in Ambérieu-en-Bugey:

- 2001: L'Emploi du temps by Laurent Cantet
- 2004: Cause toujours! by Jeanne Labrune

== Notable people ==
- Claude Victor de Boissieu (1784–1868), painter and mayor of Ambérieu
- Louis-Gabriel-Charles Vicaire (1848–1900), poet, lived here during his early years
- Roger Vailland (1907–1965), writer, lived in the hamlet of Allymes
- Denise Perrier (born 1935), actress and Miss World 1953
- Alexandre Vincendet (born 1983), politician, born here
- Laure Manaudou (born 1986), swimmer, Olympic champion, grew up here and the nautical centre bears her name
- Florent Manaudou (born 1990), swimmer, Olympic champion, grew up here

== Gallery ==
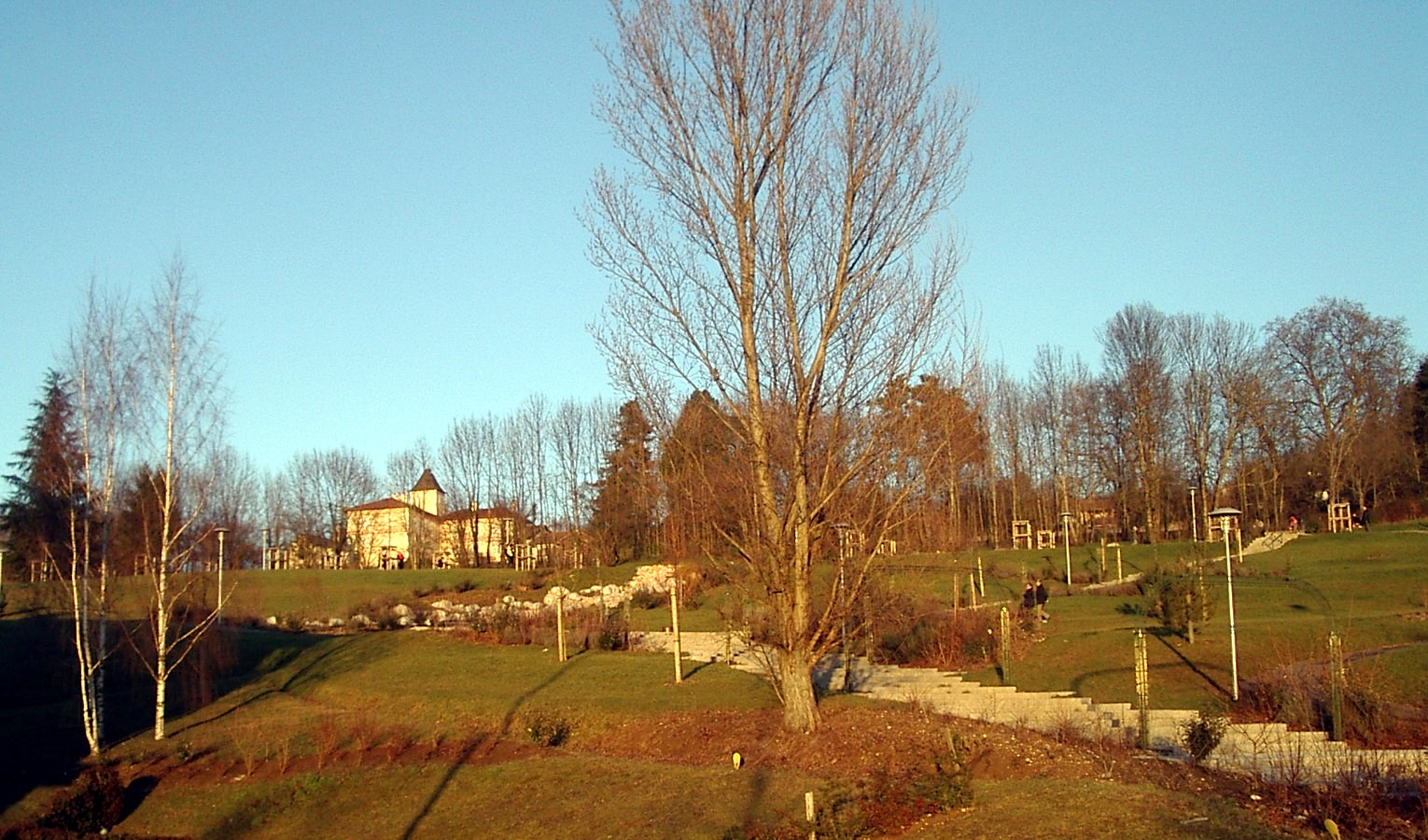
View of the Grand Dunois Park

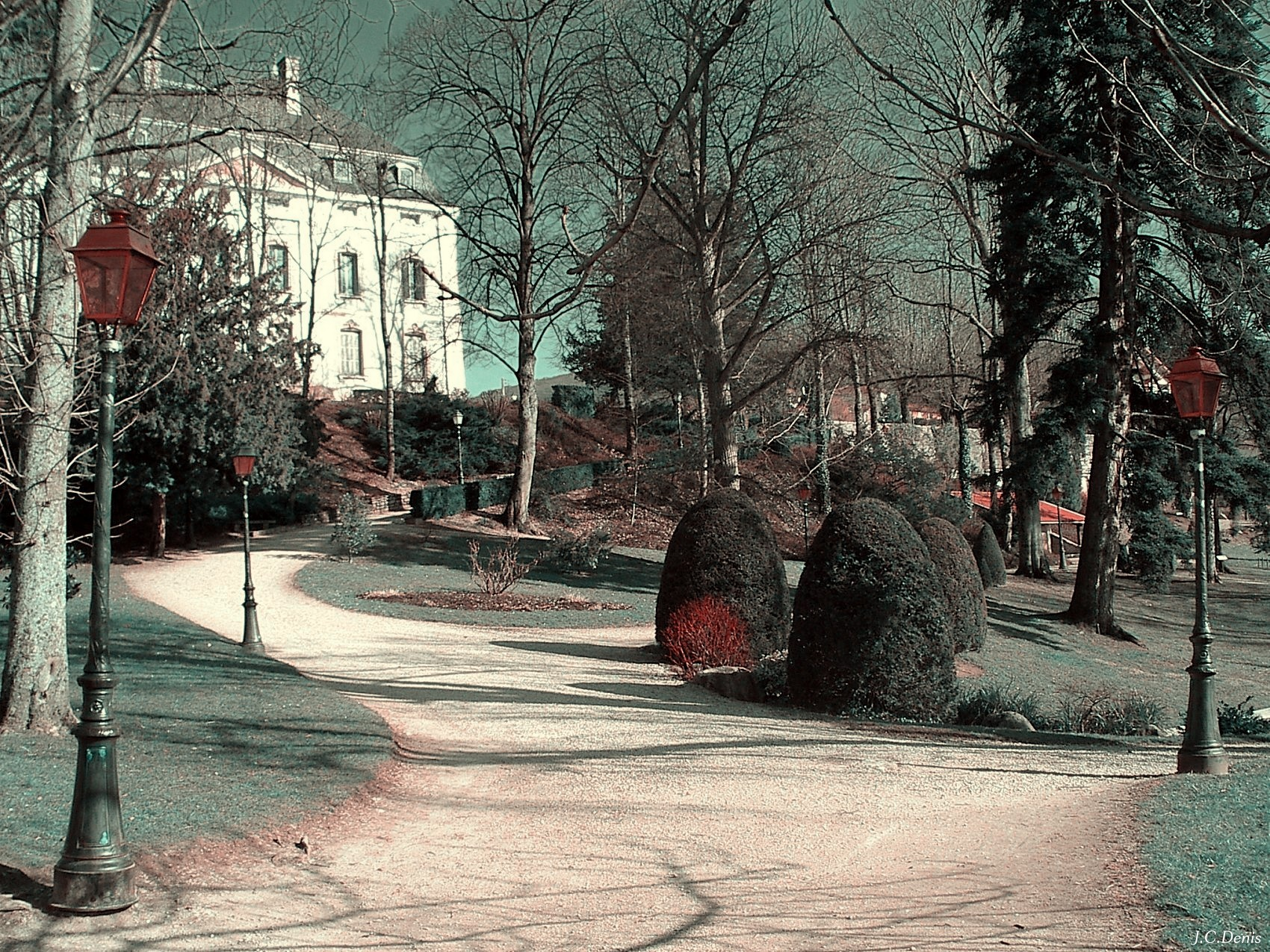
View of the Park of Échelles

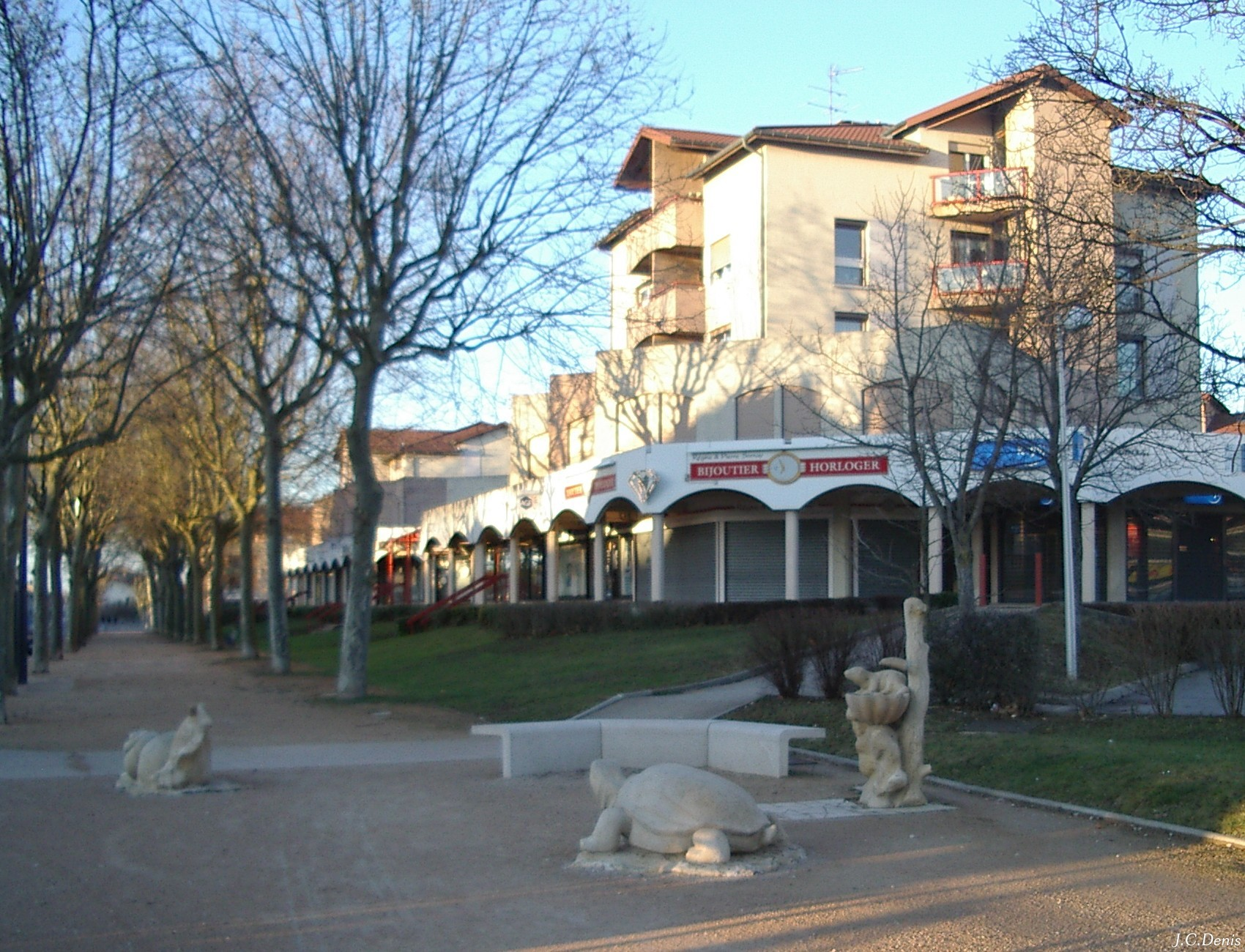
View of the arcade shops

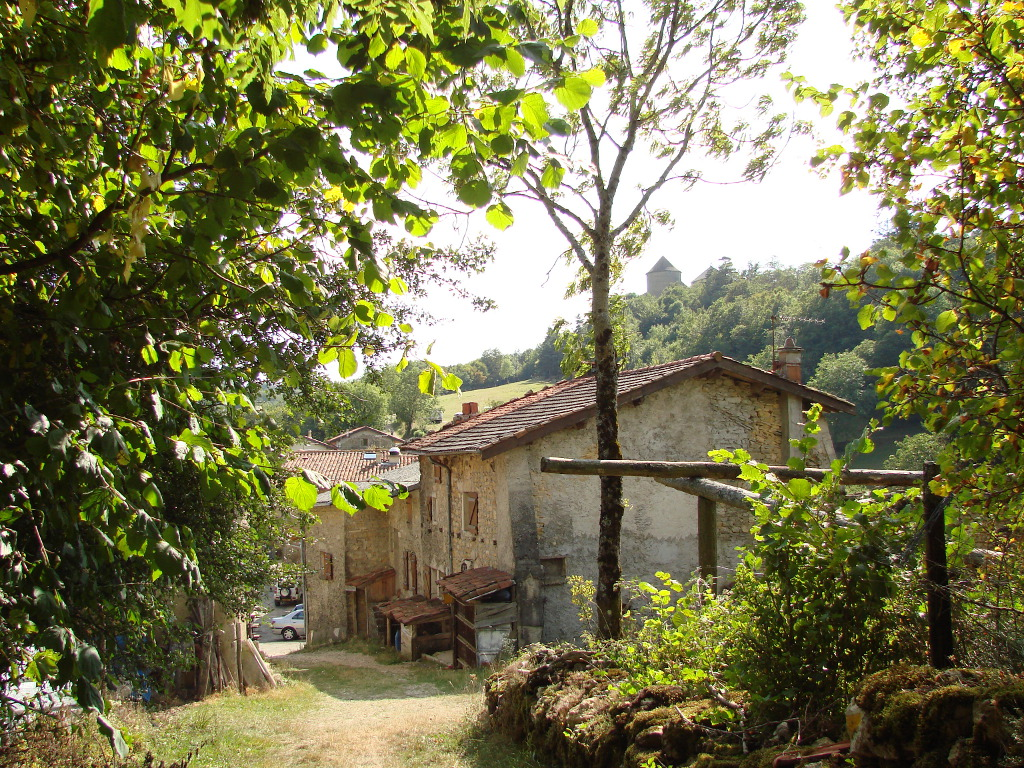
View of Bredevent and the Chateau of Allymes

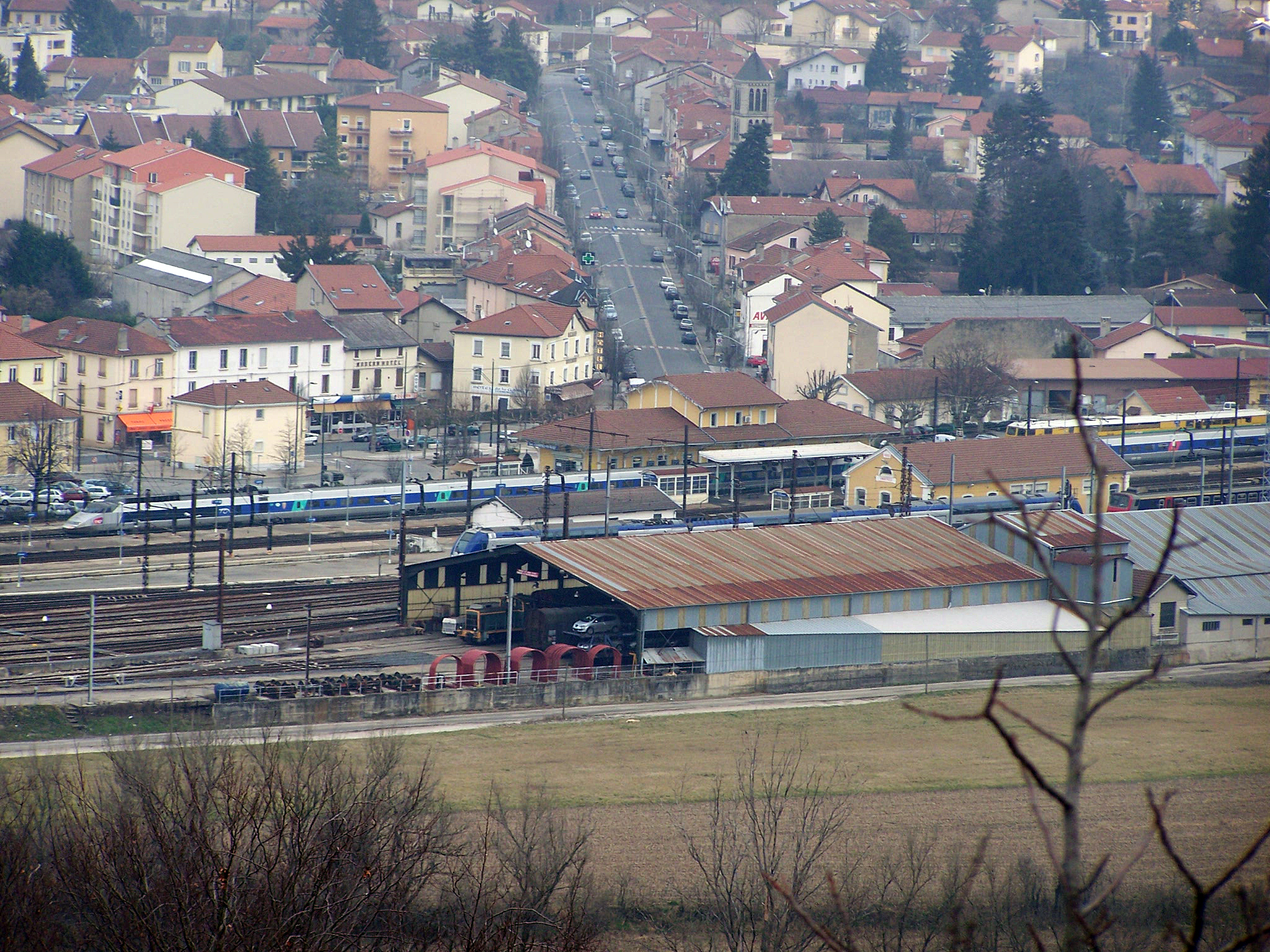
Aerial view of the station

== See also ==
- Communes of the Ain department
- Saint-Uze culture (archeology)

=== Bibliography ===
- Alphonse Vicaire, Observations on the placement of the church of Ambérieu-en-Bugey, 1867, Read on line: . (Note: Alphonse Vicaire was the father of Gabriel Vicaire.)
- André Buisson,Archaeological Map of Gaul: 01 Ain, Académie des Inscriptions et Belles-Lettres, 1990, ISBN 2877540103, (in French)
