= Ambarri =

Gallic tribe

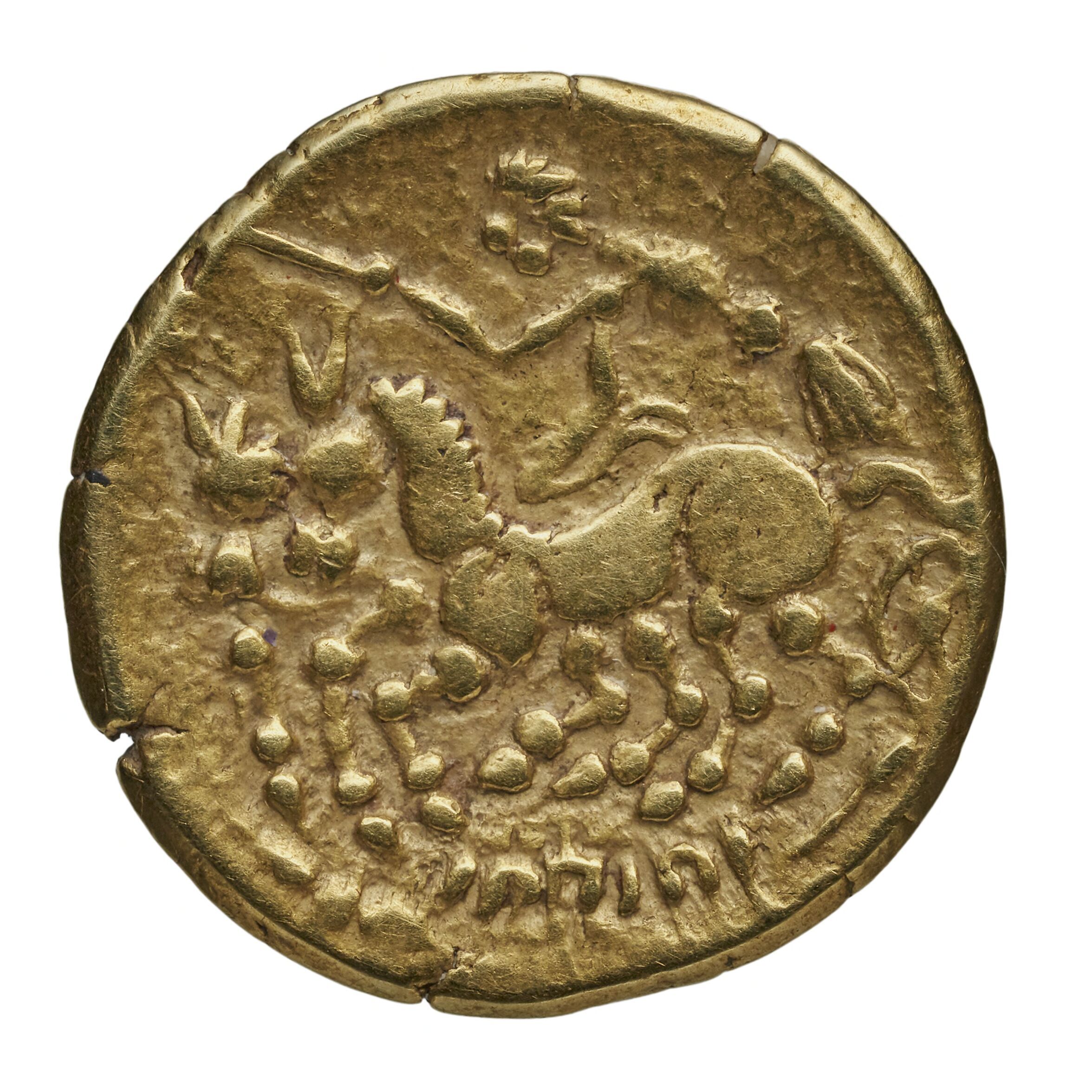
Ambarrian gold coin

The Ambarri were a Gallic people dwelling in the modern Ain department during the Iron Age and the Roman period.

== Name ==
The name is given as Ambarri by Julius Caesar (mid-1st c. BC), and by Livy (late-1st c. BC).

The Gaulish ethnonym Ambarri could mean 'on both sides of the Saône river', stemming from the Gaulish suffix amb- ('around') attached to the pre-Celtic name of the Saône river, Arar.

It has also been interpreted as a contraction of Ambi-barii ('the very-angry'), formed with the intensifying Gaulish suffix ambi- attached to bar(i)o- ('wrath, fury, passion'; cf. Welsh am-far 'mad rage', Old Irish barae 'fury, anger').

The place names of Ambérieu-en-Bugey, attested ca. 853 as Ambariacus (Ambayreu in 1240), Ambérieux-en-Dombes, attested in 501 as Ambariaco (Ambaireu in 1226), and Ambérieux, attested in 892 as Ambariacum, are named after the tribe. They originally derive from a form Ambarria attached to the suffix -acos.

== Geography ==
The Ambarri occupied a tract in the valley of the Rhône, probably in the angle between the Saône and the Rhône; and their neighbors on the east were the Allobroges. They were among the seven Gaulish tribes that according to Livy settled in Cisalpine Gaul around 600 BC in the time of Tarquinius Priscus.

They were clients of the Aedui.

== History ==
According to the Roman historian Livy, the Ambarri joined Bellovesus' legendary migrations ca. 600 BC towards Italy:

... but to Bellovesus the gods proposed a far pleasanter road, into Italy. Taking out with him the surplus population of his tribes, the Bituriges, Arverni, Senones, Haedui, Ambarri, Carnutes, and Aulerci, he marched with vast numbers of infantry and cavalry into the country of the Tricastini.

— Livy, Ab Urbe Condita Libri. 5:34:5. trans. B. O. Foster (Loeb, 1924).

Caesar does not mention them among the clientes of the Aedui (B. G. vii. 75.) but calls them close allies and kinsmen:

At the same time the [Aedui] Ambarri, close allies and kinsmen of the Aedui, informed Caesar that their lands had been laid waste, and that they could not easily safeguard their towns from the violence of the enemy.

— Livy, Commentarii de Bello Gallico. 1:11. trans. H. J. Edwards (Loeb, 1917).

They are also mentioned by Caesar along with the Aedui and the Allobroges:

And even if he [Caesar] were willing to forget an old affront, could he banish the memory of recent outrages—their [the Helvetii] attempts to march by force against his will through the Province, their ill-treatment of the Aedui, the Ambarri, the Allobroges?

— Livy, Commentarii de Bello Gallico. 1:14. trans. H. J. Edwards (Loeb, 1917).
