= Louis Nicolas Philippe Auguste de Forbin =

French painter and museum curator

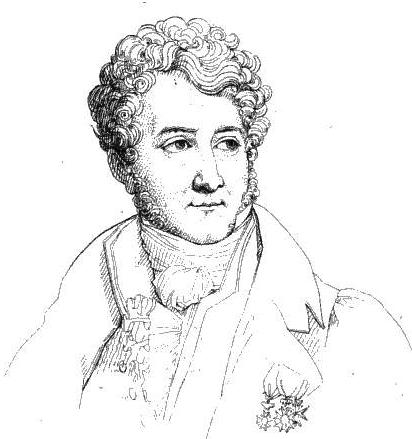
Louis Nicolas Philippe Auguste de Forbin engraved by J.M.N. Frémy after a portrait by Paulin Guérin, 1817

Louis Nicolas Philippe Auguste, comte de Forbin (19 August 1777 in La Roque-d'Anthéron, Bouches-du-Rhône – 23 February 1841 in Paris) was the French painter and antiquary who succeeded Vivant Denon as curator of the Musée du Louvre and the other museums of France.

== Biography ==
=== Early life ===
Born at his family's château, La Roque-d'Anthéron, and a Chevallier of the Order of Malta from birth, he drew before he learned to write. In his earliest training he formed a friendship with François Marius Granet that lasted through life. In the counter-revolutionary insurrection at Lyon in 1793, where he was getting instruction from Jean-Jacques de Boissieu, he lost his father, the marquis de Pont-à-Mousson, and his uncle, and was saved only by his youth. The marquise withdrew with her children quietly to Vienne and then to Provence, weathering the extreme phases of the Revolution, while Forbin and Granet developed their art by drawing in the countryside. With the Directoire, it was secure for him to go to Paris, where his good looks and easy, elegant manner recommended him as well as his art. He called Granet to join him, and both entered the large studio of Jacques-Louis David, virtually a neoclassical academy, where they matured their taste. Forbin's first submissions to the Paris Salon were in 1796, 1799 and 1800.

=== Army ===
He was conscripted into the army, married an heiress, Mlle de Dortan, then gained leave from his regiment in 1802 to travel to Rome with Granet, where he fell into the facile manner of a highly accomplished dilettante, as he was received by the best of Francophile Roman society; in 1804 he was given the post of chamberlain to Emperor Napoleon Bonaparte's sister Princess Pauline Borghese. They were lovers from 1805 to 1807, living together at the Place Forbin, Cours Mirabeau, Aix-en-Provence, from May to October 1807.

Rejoining the army, he served with distinction under Junot in Portugal, and received the Croix d'honneur, then served in the Austrian campaign of 1809, returning to Italy after the peace of Schönbrunn. Here he produced his history paintings, Inês de Castro and The Taking of Granada as well as a sentimental novel, Charles Barimore (published anonymously, Paris 1810).

=== Museum career ===
With the Bourbon Restoration, he was welcome in Paris to assume the post vacated by Vivant-Denon, too indelibly stamped with Napoleonic connections; the comte de Forbin was appointed Director-General of Royal Museums at the Musée Royal (the Louvre) and Musée du Luxembourg, which were suddenly denuded of their Napoleonic trophies, which were returned to Italy. The Borghese collection of antiquities purchased from Prince Camillo helped fill the void, and the former Cabinet du Roi and works of art in storage at Versailles. The suites of paintings by Rubens and Le Sueur from the Palais du Luxembourg now came to the Louvre, and the remnants of the Revolutionary and Napoleonic musée des Augustins, as the works that had been sequestered from churches were returned to them.

The Institut de France was now reorganized, and in the Académie des Beaux-Arts the comte de Forbin received a seat, by royal order, 16 April 1816. Forbin was made a commander of the Legion of Honor and an honorary Gentleman of the King's Bedchamber.

==== Travel in the Levant ====
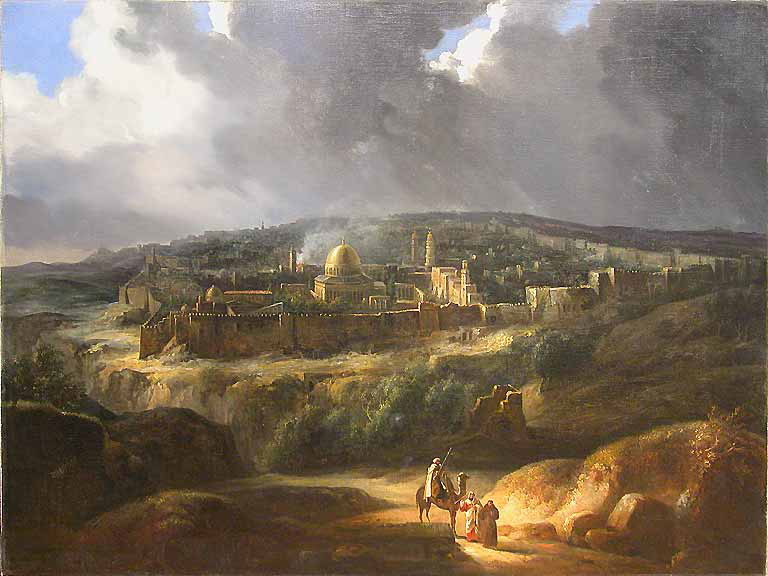
Forbin's painting "Vue de Jérusalem près de la vallée de Josaphat"

Forbin boarded the frigate Cléopâtra for an expedition to the Levant to purchase Greek and Roman works of art. The company, which departed from Toulon 22 August 1817, was composed of Forbin, his cousin, abbé Charles-Marie-Auguste-Joseph de Forbin-Janson, later Bishop of Nancy, the architect Jean-Nicolas Huyot, the painter Pierre Prévost, later known for his landscape panoramas, and a young painter, Cochereau, Prévost's nephew, who was taken on to provide architectural drawings and renditions of sites, but succumbed before the expedition reached Athens; almost unnoticed was a young man who swiftly took Cochereau's place, Louis Maurice Adolphe Linant de Bellefonds, destined for a career in Egypt. The party visited Melos, where Huyot had the misfortune to break his leg and could not join the company at Athens, Constantinople, Smyrna, Ephesus, Acre, Syria, Caesarea, Ascalon on the coast of Palestine, with a side trip to Jerusalem the Dead Sea and the River Jordan, and finally Egypt. After the 13-day journey from the port of Jaffa "which had been one continued series of privations and disagreeable incidents of every kind", Forbin observed of Damietta,

The streets are narrow and unpaved, and the houses made of bricks, but the whole are half destroyed. You cannot walk in the town, without being under apprehensions of some worm-eaten post or projecting part of a building falling on you: the whole surface is covered with dust and rottenness; the mosques have lost their gates, and the minarets threaten to crush the passenger with dilapidated and half broken down arches.

They returned by the Nile to Cairo, where they disembarked in December 1818. Forbin provided a detailed illustration of Giovanni Belzoni's plans for penetration of the "second pyramid". The Voyage dans le Levant was published in 1819, with 80 plates. Another result was Forbin's modestly titled account of the voyage, illustrated with lithographs from his drawings, Livre de croquis d'un voyageur ("Sketchbook of a Traveller").

==== Career in museums ====
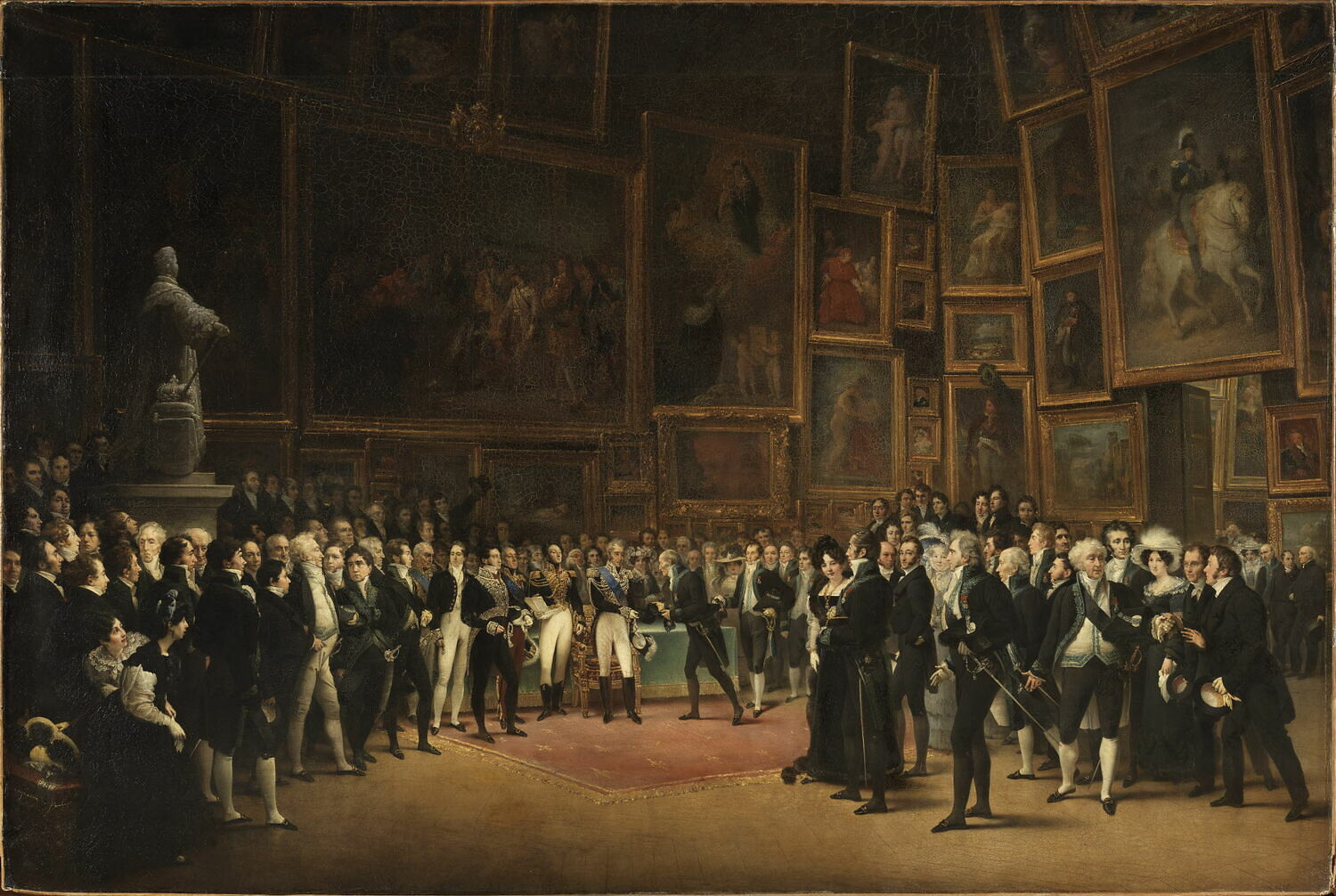
Charles X Distributing Awards to Artists by François Joseph Heim. Forbin is shown close to Charles X at the 1824 Salon.

Some remnants of Antiquity from the tour entered the Louvre, but the coup was the acquisition of the Venus de Milo, discovered in 1820. The Director-General of Royal Museums was able to get Louis XVIII to set aside political distaste and authorize the purchase of David's Intervention of the Sabine Women and Thermopyle for the Louvre, and, even more daring Théodore Géricault's The Raft of the Medusa, which Forbin had been pressing as a royal purchase, and which was eventually bought from the painter's heirs in 1824.

Under his guidance post-Renaissance sculptures were brought together and exhibited as the musée d'Angoulême, from the rooms that had served Napoleon's Council of State were exorcised new decorative paintings and allegorical ceilings by the most current painters (1825–1827), and a musée Charles X opened in 1827 to display Etruscan and Egyptian antiquities. The palais du Luxembourg was opened as a museum of contemporary art purchased by the State. Plaster casts of antique sculptures, designed to inspire students, were actively sought.

=== Decline ===
At the end of 1828, the comte de Forbin suffered a partial stroke, from which he never fully recovered. His intellectual faculties were affected, and his memory. He withdrew into a studious solitude, retouching — and spoiling — the paintings of his youth. Louis-Philippe extended to him the position of director of the royal museums, but Alphonse de Cailleux, who had been his administrative assistant for some time, was actually in charge. A second attack, 12 February 1841, left him paralysed and he died soon afterwards. Cailleux succeeded him in his Louvre post.

A commemorative Portefeuille of forty-five his drawings, with an appreciative text by his brother-in-law M. de Marcellus, was published in 1843.

== Bibliography ==
Un Mois à Venise, 1825

- l'Éruption du Vésuve
- la Mort de Pline
- la Vision d'Ossian
- la Procession des Pénitents noirs
- une Scène de l'Inquisition
- Inès de Castro
- le Campo Santode Pise
- le Cloître de Santa Maria Novella à Florence

== See also ==
- Jean-Jacques de Boissieu
