= Claude Victor de Boissieu =

French painter

Claude Victor de Boissieu (28 November 1784 – 23 November 1868) was a French artist and local politician.

Boissieu was born in Ambérieu-en-Bugey, Ain. He first studied art under his uncle, the engraver Jean-Jacques de Boissieu (1736–1810). After working at court during the restoration of the monarchy after 1815, de Boissieu served as Mayor of Ambérieu-en-Bugey, Justice of the Peace, and Councillor for Ain.

== Works ==
- Flora of Europe (Published between 1804 and 1823 by Bruyset, Lyon).
- Second picturesque journey through parts of Bugey, Savoy and Switzerland in July–August 1811
- Diverse other works including Portrait Of My Uncle Lieutenant Camille-Marie de Valous; The Door To The Park (1806).

== Sources ==
- Bénézit Dictionary of Artists, Ed. Gründ.
- Dictionary of French Biography
