= Château des Allymes =

Castle in Ambérieu-en-Bugey, Ain, France

- Part of Rhône-Alpes region
- South-eastern France
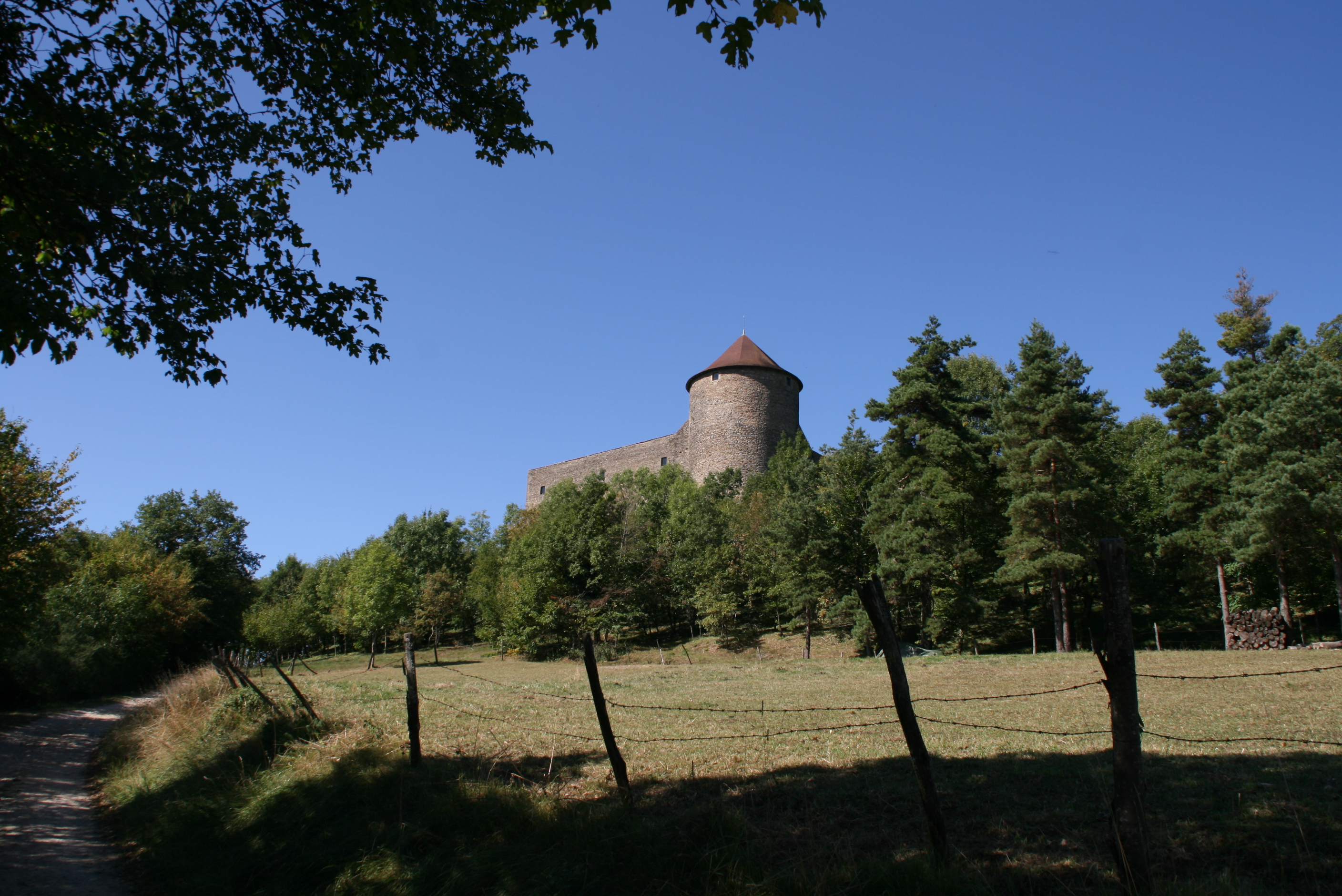
- Château des Allymes

Site information
- Type: Fortified castle

Location
- Coordinates: 45.9737°N 5.4102°E

Site history
- Built: 13th century
- Materials: Stone
- Events: Delphino-Savoyard War

Garrison information
- Occupants: French, Savoyard

The Château des Allymes is a thirteenth-century castle which was rebuilt in the sixteenth century and restored in the nineteenth. It is located in the hamlet of Les Allymes, in the Ambérieu-en-Bugey commune in the Ain department of France, in the Rhône-Alpes region.

The castle was built by the Dauphin of Viennois to protect the people from attacks that were ravaging the country. It is approached by the hamlet of Brey-de-Vent, and is the only example of a medieval fortress in Bugey.

On 20 July 1960 the Château des Allymes was classed a monument historique.

== Location ==
The location of the castle gives it an exceptional view of the plain of Bresse and the Dombes. The castle overlooks the plain of Ain from a height of some 800 m, and is to the south-west of Mount Luisandre. It commands a view of the Ambérieu-en-Bugey commune, to which it has belonged since 1984.

== History ==
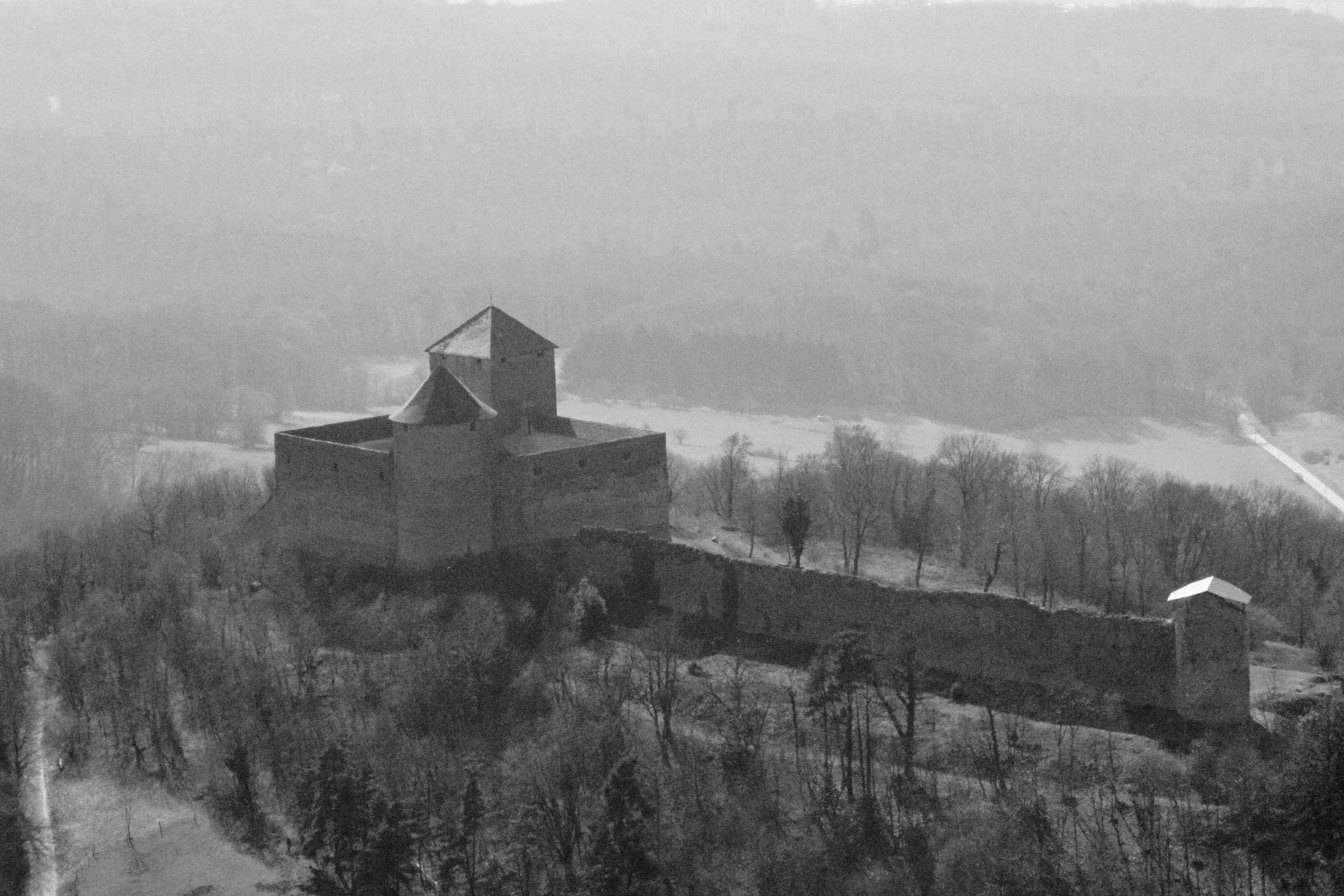
The Château des Allymes

The Château des Allymes became French by the Treaty of Lyon in 1601 when Henri IV succeeded in reuniting Bugey to the Kingdom of France. At the time it was in a strategic military position as it was near the border with Savoy, which was then an independent state.

First conquered by the counts of Savoy, the castle passed to René de Lucinge, the Savoyard ambassador to the French king. Lucinge, a man of letters and historian, left records about his life and his work on the surrounding wall of the castle.

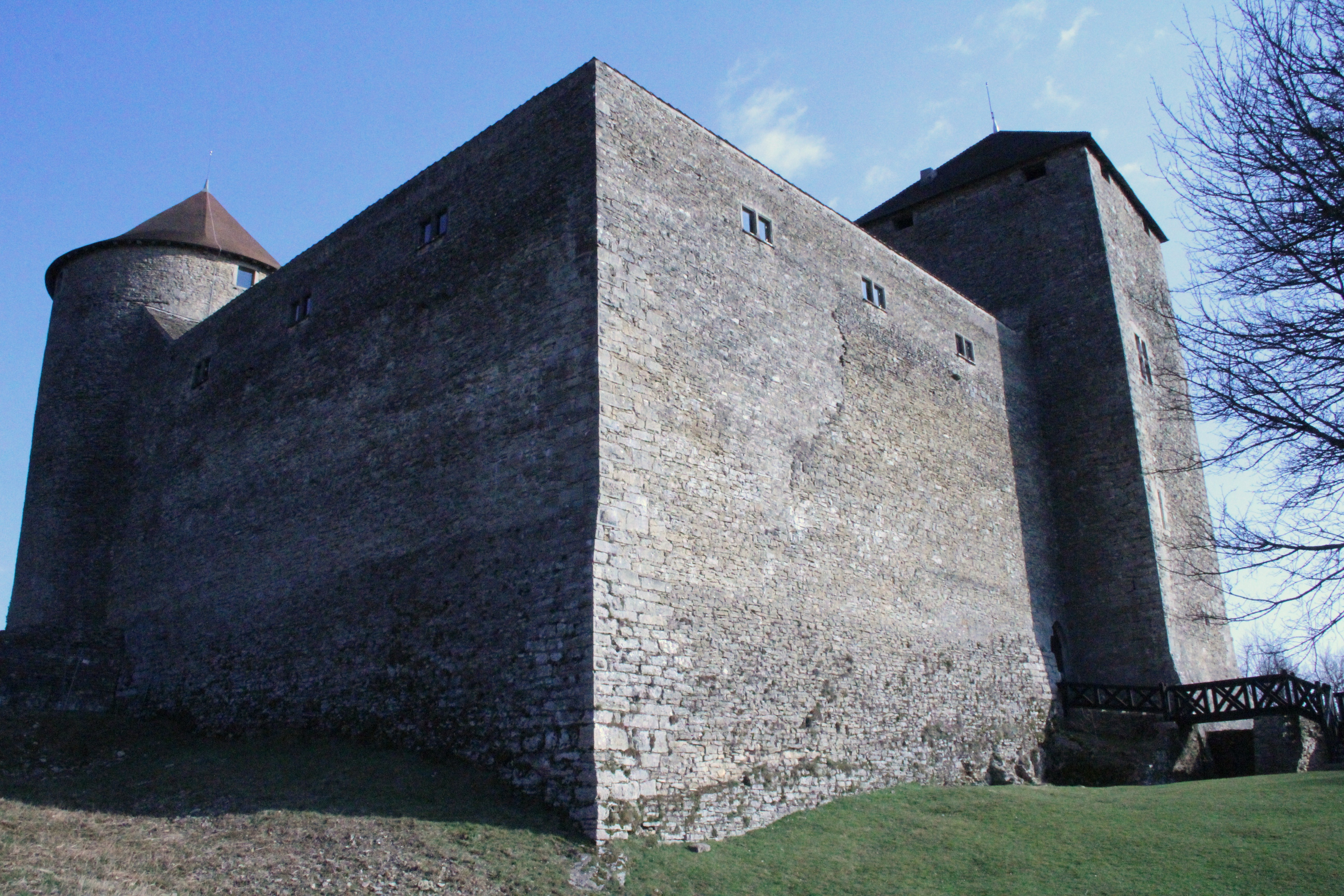
The Château des Allymes

The castle was built around 1310 to fight the Savoyard influence. It was initially built principally of earth and wood. A few years later, a truce between the two parties forbade the building of new structures. The truce was little respected, however, and each side hurried to build stone castles. The masters of this work in Allymes were the master-masons "Peronner" and "Guillemet d'Hières".

The Delphino-Savoyard war was finished in 1335 by the transfer of the Château des Allymes, commanded by the châtelain "Guy de Lutin", to the count of Savoy. The king of France John the Good; his son Charles, dauphin of Viennois; and the count Amadeus VI of Savoy ratified the definitive peace treaty of the 5th of January 1335, signed in Paris. The frontier was thenceforward moved to the banks of the Rhône which relegated the Château des Allymes to the interior of the kingdom, losing it its strategic value. The count of Savoy, Amadeus VI split the seigneury of Saint-Germain and restored the stronghold to François Nicod in 1354, who thus became the owner of the castle. On the 16th of September 1477, Claudine François married d'Humbert de Lucinge, and the Lucinge family took possession of the fortress.

When the castle again became French in 1601, René de Lucinge swore allegiance to the French king Henri IV. The castle passed successively to the Suduyraud, and Etienne families, and finally the Dujat family, the last proprietors before the Revolution. The castle fell into disrepair until a descendant of the Dujats, Adolphe de Tricaud d'Ambérieu, undertook its restoration in 1847. The curtain walls were rebuilt and re-equipped with a covered way, and the round tower was recovered.

In 1959, the De Tricaud family sold the castle to Mr Peyre before its classification as a historical monument in 1960. In 1964, a first phase of work restored the keep and the Gothic quarters. The roof and frame of the round tower were restored in 1977, the four curtain walls in 1984 and finally the barbican at the main entrance in 1991. The castle has been the object of many excavation and restoration programs.

The castle has been the property of the village of Ambérieu-en-Bugey since 1984, and is managed and maintained by an association of friends of the castle.

== Description ==
The Château des Allymes is representative of the medieval stone castle—a large ancient stronghold, firmly built on the side of a hill and commanding the plain below. It also has two towers, connected by curtain walls. The exterior consists of a large wall 90 metres (300 ft) long terminating in a lookout tower that once protected an adjoining town.

The quadrangular enclosure of the castle is flanked by a large cylindrical donjon of the Roman type and by a round tower connected by four curtain walls. This section dates from 1351.

The inside is also not without interest, including Gothic living quarters, the donjon, beautiful halls with well-preserved woodwork, and a restored barbican defending the entrance.

== See also ==
List of castles in France
