= Jean-Jacques de Boissieu =

Self-portrait by Jean-Jacques de Boissieu

Jean-Jacques de Boissieu (Lyon 30 November 1736 – 1 March 1810 Lyon) was a French draughtsman, etcher, and engraver.

== Biography ==
Boissieu was born at Lyon and studied at the École Gratuite de Dessin in his hometown but was mostly self-taught. He began making prints in the period 1758–64, then went to Italy in the retinue of the ambassador Louis Alexandre, Duc de la Rochefoucauld d'Enville (1743–1792); he met Voltaire on his way, and returned with a collection of landscape drawings.

Jean-Jacques de Boissieu realised some plates for the Diderot-d'Alembert Encyclopédie.

He continued to produce prints in Lyon, which earned him a reputation as the last representative of the older etching tradition. Boissieu made many etchings of the Roman and Dutch countryside, as well as the countryside around Lyon. He was also sought after as a reproductive engraver.

His pupils included Louis Nicolas Philippe Auguste de Forbin and his nephew Claude Victor de Boissieu.
