= Henri Louis Augustin de Boissieu =

French general

Henri Louis Augustin de Boissieu du Bois-Noir (18 July 1741 - 1795) was a French general.

== Biography ==
Boissieu was born in Bois-Noir on 18 July 1741. He graduated from military school in 1757 with the rank of second lieutenant of artillery.

In 1784, Boissieu was promoted to brigadier general of infantry; he was made maréchal de camp in 1791.
