= List of works by Carlo Goldoni =

The following is a list of works by Venetian playwright and librettist Carlo Goldoni (1707–1793).

== Tragedies ==
- Amalasunta, burned by Goldoni after its premiere (1733)
- Belisario (1734)
- Rosmonda (1734)
- Griselda (1734)
- Enrico re di Sicilia (1736)
- Gli amori di Alessandro Magno (1759)
- Enea nel Lazio (1760)
- Nerone (1760)
- Artemisia (never performed)

== Tragicomedies ==
- Belisario (1734)
- Don Giovanni Tenorio o sia Il dissoluto, "The Dissolute" (1735)
- Rinaldo di Montalbano (1736)
- Giustino (17??)
- La sposa persiana, "The Persian Wife", in verse (1753)
- Ircana in Julfa, "Ircana in Jaffa" (17??)
- Ircana in Ispaan, "Ircana in Isfahan" (17??)
- La peruviana, "The Peruvian Woman" (17??)
- La bella selvaggia, "The Savage Beauty" (17??)
- La dalmatina, "The Dalmatian Woman" (1758)
- Gli amori di Alessandro Magno, "The Loves of Alexander the Great" (17??)
- Artemisia, "Artemisia" (17??)
- Enea nel Lazio, "Aeneas in Latium" (17??)
- Zoroastro, "Zoroaster" (17??)
- La bella giorgiana, "The Georgian Beauty" (1761)

== Comedies ==
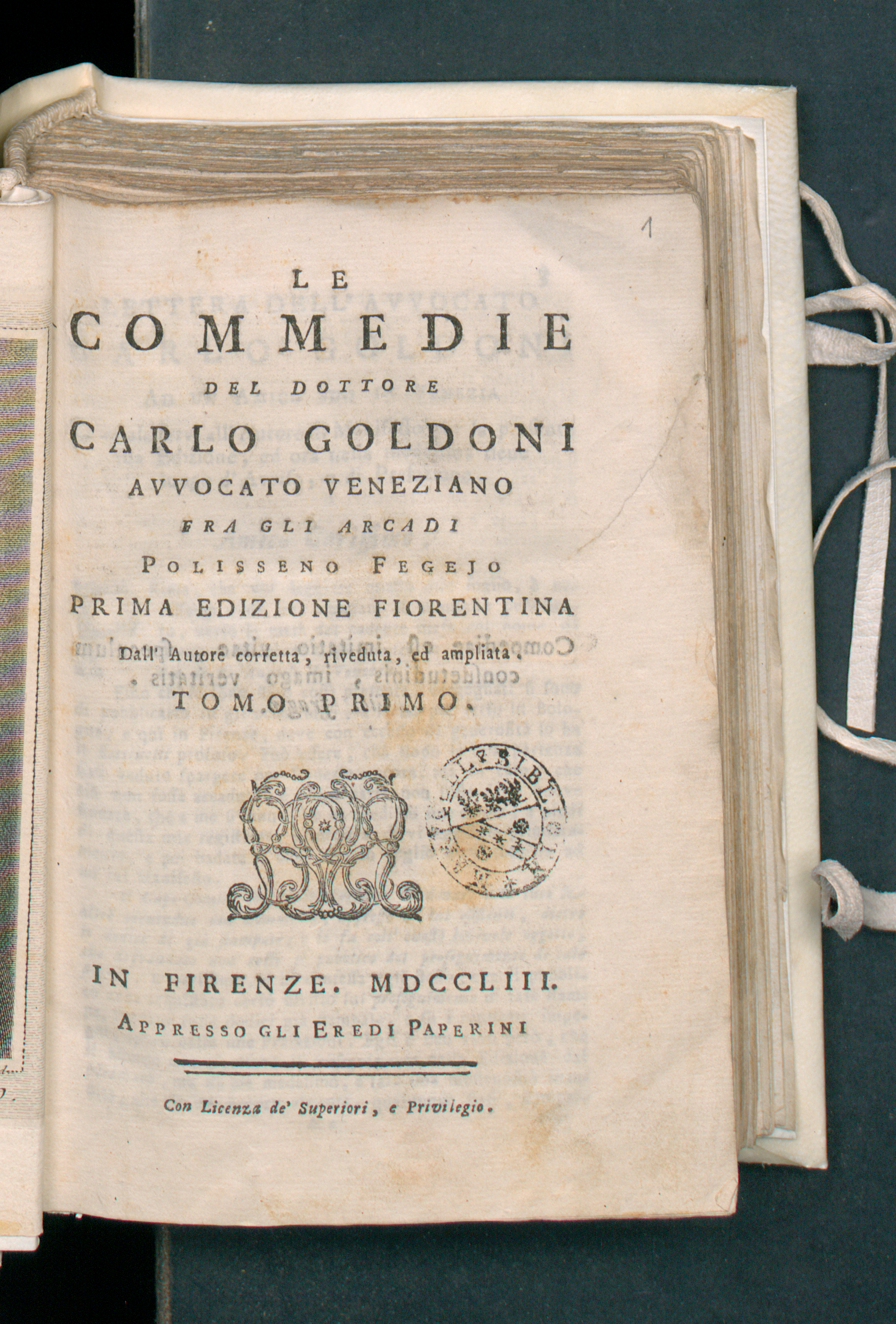
Commedie del dottore Carlo Goldoni (1753)

- Un curioso accidente, "A Curious Mishap" (1760)
- L'uomo di mondo, "The Man of the World" (17??)
- Il prodigo, "The Prodigal Man" (17??)
- Il Momolo cortesan, partly written, partly improvised (1738), "Momolo the Court Man"
- Il mercante fallito o sia La bancarotta, "The Bankrupted Merchant" or "The Bankruptcy" (1741)
- La donna di garbo (1743), "The Fashionable Woman"
- Il servitore di due padroni, (1745) "The Servant of Two Masters" (now often retitled Arlecchino servitore di due padroni "Harlequin Servant of two Masters")
- Il frappatore (17??)"The deceiver"
- I due gemelli veneziani, "The Two Venetian Twins" (1745)
- L'uomo prudente, "The Prudent Man" (17??)
- La vedova scaltra, "The Shrewd Widow" (1748)
- La putta onorata, "The Honorable Maid" (1749)
- La buona moglie, "The Good Wife" (1749)
- Il cavaliere e la dama, "The Gentleman and the Lady" (1749)
- L'avvocato veneziano, "The Venetian Lawyer" (17??)
- Il padre di famiglia, "The Father of the Family" (17??)
- La famiglia dell'antiquario, "The Antiquarian's Family" (1750)
- L'erede fortunata, "The Lucky Heiress" (1750)
- Il teatro comico, "The Comical Theatre" (1750–1751)
- Le femmine puntigliose, "The Obstinate Women" (1750–1751)
- La bottega del caffè, "The Coffee Shop" (1750–1751)
- Il bugiardo, "The Liar" (1750–1751)
- L'adulatore, "The Flatterer" (17??)
- Il poeta fanatico, "The Fanatical Poet" (1750)
- La Pamela, "Pamela" (17??)
- Il cavaliere di buon gusto, "The Gentleman with Good Taste" (17??)
- Il giuocatore, "The Gambler" (1750)
- Il vero amico, "The True Friend" (1750) translated by Anna Cuffaro
- La finta ammalata, "The Fake Patient Woman" (1750–1751)
- La dama prudente, "The Prudent Lady" (17??)
- L'incognita, "The Unknown Woman" (17??)
- L'avventuriere onorato, "The Honorable Scoundrel" (1750–1751)
- I pettegolezzi delle donne, "Women's Gossip" (1750–1751)
- La locandiera, "The Mistress of the Inn" (1751)
- Il Molière, "Molière" (17??)
- La castalda (17??)"The Female Administrator"
- L'amante militare, "The Military Lover" (17??)
- Il tutore, "The Guardian" (17??)
- La moglie saggia, "The Wise Wife" (1752)
- Il feudatario "The Feudal Lord" (1752)
- Le donne gelose, "The Jealous Women" (1752)
- La serva amorosa, "The Loving Maid" (1752)
- I puntigli domestici, "The Domestic Squabbles" (17??)
- La figlia obbediente, "The Obedient Daughter" (17??)
- I mercatanti, "The Merchants" (17??)
- Le donne curiose, "The Curious Women" (1753)
- Il contrattempo o sia Il chiacchierone imprudente, "The Unwelcome Event" or "The Careless Chatterbox" (17??)
- La donna vendicativa, "The Vengeful Woman" (17??)
- Opening sketch for the Teatro Comico di San Luca, 7 October 1753
- Il geloso avaro, "The Jealous Miser" (17??)
- La donna di testa debole, "The Feebleminded Woman" (17??)
- La cameriera brillante, "The Brilliant Maidservant" (17??)
- Il filosofo inglese, "The English Philosopher" (17??)
- Il vecchio bizzarro, "The Bizarre Old Man" (17??)
- Il festino, "The Banquet" (17??)
- L'impostore, "The Impostor" (17??)
- Opening sketch for the Teatro Comico di San Luca, fall season 1754
- La madre amorosa, "The Loving Mother" (17??)
- Terenzio, "Terentio" (17??)
- Torquato Tasso, "Torquato Tasso" (17??)
- Il cavaliere giocondo, "The Merry Gentleman" (17??)
- Le massere (1755)"The Servant Girls"
- I malcontenti, "The Unsatisfied Men" (17??)
- Opening sketch for the Teatro Comico di San Luca, fall season, 1755
- La buona famiglia, "The Good Family" (17??)
- Le donne de casa soa, "The Women from His Own Home"(1755)
- La villeggiatura, "The Vacation" (1761)
- La donna stravagante, "The Extravagant Woman" (17??)
- Il campiello (1756) "The Little Square"
- L'avaro, "The Miser" (17??)
- L'amante di se medesimo, "The Lover of Himself" (17??)
- Il medico olandese, "The Dutch Doctor" (17??)
- La donna sola, "The Lone Woman" (17??)
- La pupilla, "The Female Ward" (1734)
- Il cavaliere di spirito o sia La donna di testa debole, "The Witty Gentleman" or "The Feebleminded Woman" (17??)
- La vedova spiritosa, "The Witty Widow" (17??)
- Il padre per amore, "The Father for Love" (17??)
- Lo spirito di contraddizione, "The Spirit of Contradiction" (17??)
- Il ricco insidiato, "The Sought After Rich man" (17??)
- Le morbinose
- Le donne di buon umore, "The Good Humored Women" (17??)
- L'apatista o sia L'indifferente, "The Apathic Man" or "The Indifferent Man" (17??)
- La donna bizzarra, "The Bizarre Woman" (17??)
- La sposa sagace, "The Clever Wife" (17??)
- La donna di governo (17??)"The Government Woman"
- La donna forte, "The Strong Woman" (17??)
- I morbinosi (1759)?
- La scuola di ballo, "The Dance School" (17??)
- Gl'innamorati, "The Lovers" (1759)
- Pamela maritata, "Pamela Married" (17??)
- L'impresario delle Smirne, "Director of the Opera at Smyrna" (1759)
- La guerra, "The War" (17??)
- I rusteghi, "The Boors" (1760)
- Il curioso accidente, "The Curious Incident" (1760)
- La donna di maneggio (17??)"The Woman in Charge"
- La casa nova, "The New House" (1760)
- La buona madre, "The Good Mother" (1761)
- Le smanie per la villeggiatura, "Pining for Vacation" (1761)
- Le avventure della villeggiatura, "Holiday Adventures" (1761)
- Il ritorno dalla villeggiatura, "Back from Vacation" (1761)
- Lo scozzese, "The Scotsman" (17??)
- Il buon compatriotto, "The Good Compatriot" (17??)
- Il sior Todero brontolon o sia Il vecchio fastidioso, "Grumpy Mr. Todero or the Annoying Old Man" (1762)
- Le baruffe chiozzotte (1762)"The Chioggia Scuffles"
- Una delle ultime sere di carnevale, "One of the Last Carnival Evenings" (1762)
- L'osteria della posta, "The Tavern at the Mail Station" (17??)
- L'amore paterno o sia La serva riconoscente, "Paternal Love" or "The Grateful Maidservant" (17??)
- Il matrimonio per concorso, "Marriage by Contest" (17??)
- Les amours d'Arlequin et de Camille, "The Love of Harlequin And Camilla" (1763)
- La jalousie d'Arlequin, "Harlequin's Jealousy" (1763)
- Les inquiétudes de Camille, "Camilla's Worries" (1763)
- Gli amori di Zelinda e Lindoro, "The Love of Zelinda and Lindoro" (1764)
- La gelosia di Lindoro, "Lindoro's Jealousy" (17??)
- L'inquietudini di Zelinda, "Zelinda's Worries" (17??)
- Gli amanti timidi o sia L'imbroglio de' due ritratti, "The Shy Lovers" or "The Affair of the Two Portraits" (17??)
- Il ventaglio, "The Fan" (1765)
- La burla retrocessa nel contraccambio (17??)"The returned joke"
- Chi la fa l'aspetti o sia I chiassetti del carneval (17??)"What goes around comes around" or "The Carnival Lanes"
- Il genio buono e il genio cattivo, "The Good Nature and the Bad Nature" (17??)
- Le bourru bienfaisant (1771)"The Benevolent Curmudgeon" (17??)
- L'avare fastueux (1776)"The Ostentatious Miser"

== Opera seria libretti ==
- Amalasunta (1732)
- Gustavo primo, re di Svezia (c. 1738)
- Oronte, re de' Sciti (1740)
- Statira (c. 1740)

== Opera buffa libretti ==
- La fondazione di Venezia (1734)
- La contessina (The Young Countess) by Maccari (1743)
- La favola dei tre gobbi (1748)
- L'Arcadia in Brenta (The Arcadia in Brenta) by Galuppi (1749)
- Il filosofo di campagna (The Country Philosopher) by Galuppi (1754)
- Il mercato di Malmantile (The Malmantile Market) by Fischietti (1757)
- La buona figliuola (The Good Girl) by Niccolò Piccinni (1760)
- La buona figliuola maritata by Piccinni (1761)
- La bella verità by Piccinni (1762)
- Lo speziale (The Apothecary) by Joseph Haydn (1768)
- La notte critica by Piccinni (1767)
- La finta semplice (The Fake Innocent) by Wolfgang Amadeus Mozart (1769)
- Le pescatrici (The Fisherwomen) by Haydn (1770)
- Il mondo della luna (The World on the Moon) by Haydn (1777)
- Vittorina by Piccinni (1777)
- Il festino
- I viaggiatori ridicoli
- Vittorina
- Il re alla caccia
- La bouillotte
- I volponi
- Gli uccellatori
- Arcifanfano, Re de' matti
- L'isola disabitata
- La calamita de' cuori
- Il negligente
- I bagni d'Abano
- Le virtuose ridicole
- Il finto principe
- L'astuzia felice
- Bertoldo, Bertoldino e Cascasenno
- I portentosi effetti della madre natura
- Lucrezia romana
- Il mondo alla rovescia
- Buovo d'Antona
- Il paese delle cuccagna
- La mascherata
- Il conte Caramella
- La donna di governo
- La fiera di Sinigaglia

== Intermezzo libretti ==
- Il buon padre, "The Good Father" (1729)
- La cantatrice, "The Singer" (1729)
- Il gondoliere veneziano o sia Gli sdegni amorosi, The Venetian Gondoliere or the Lover's Scorn (1733)
- La pupilla (1734)
- La birba (1734)
- Il quartiere fortunato (1734–44)
- Amor fa l'uomo cieco (uncertain date)
- Il disinganno (uncertain date)
- Le donne vendicate, "The Revenge of the Women" (1751)

== Cantatas and serenades ==
- La ninfa saggia, "The Wise Nymph" (1739)
- Gli amanti felici, "The Happy Lovers" (1739)
- Le quattro stagioni, "The Four Seasons" (1739)
- Il coro delle muse, "The Choir of the Muses" (1740)
- La pace consolata, "Peace Comforted" (17??)
- L'amor della patria, "Love for the Country" (17??)
- L'oracolo del Vaticano, "The Vatican's Oracle" (17??)

== Oratorios ==
- Magdalena conversio, "The Conversion of Magdalene" (17??)

== Religious plays ==
- L'unione del reale profeta Davide, "The Marriage of Royal Prophet David" (17??)

== Performances ==
- La metempsicosi o sia La pitagorica trasmigrazione, "The Metempsychosis" or "The Pythagorean Transmigration" (17??)
- Il disinganno in corte, "The Disappointment at the Court" (17??)

== Poetry ==
- Il colosso, a satire against Pavia girls which led to Goldoni being expelled from Collegio Ghislieri (1725)
- Il quaresimale in epilogo (1725–1726)

== Books ==
- Nuovo teatro comico, "New Comic Theater", plays. Pitteri, Venice (1757)
- Mémoires, "Memoirs". Paris (1787)
- Goldoni's collected works. Zalta, Venice (1788–1795)

== Translations ==
- La storia di Miss Jenny, "The Story of Miss Jenny" of Riccoboni, into French
