= 1750 in literature =

This article contains information about the literary events and publications of 1750.

== Events ==
- March – The Rambler is founded by Edward Cave; it lasts for 208 issues, and is mostly written by Samuel Johnson.
- March 5 – Shakespeare's Richard II (in Colley Cibber's version) is presented at their theatre on Nassau Street (Manhattan) by Walter Murray and Thomas Kean, the earliest known significant professional performance of Shakespeare in North America.
- unknown dates
  - Weekly meetings for contributors to the Encyclopédie begin, at the salon of Baron d'Holbach.
  - Jean-Jacques Rousseau wins the prize of the Academy of Dijon for his Discourse on the Arts and Sciences.
  - London theatres wage "the Romeo and Juliet war" – competing productions appear with David Garrick and Anne Bellamy at the Theatre Royal, Drury Lane and with Spranger Barry and Susannah Cibber at the Royal Opera House in Covent Garden.
  - Old Orchard Street Theatre opens in Bath (England) under the management of John Palmer, with a performance of Shakespeare's Henry IV, Part 2.
  - Carlo Goldoni commits himself to writing a comedy for each week of the 1750–1751 seasons at Gerolamo Medebach's Teatro San Angelo in Venice – 16 plays.
- After taking an M.D. at Aberdeen, Tobias Smollett travels in France, collecting material for The Adventures of Peregrine Pickle.

== New books ==
=== Fiction ===
- Anonymous
  - The Adventures of Mr. Loveill, interspers'd with many real amours of the modern polite world
  - The Nominal Husband, or, Distress'd Innocence
  - Revived Fugitive: a novel, translated from the French
- Henry Brooke – A New Collection of Fairy Tales
- John Cleland – Fanny Hill (official and expurgated)
- Sarah Fielding (attributed) – The History of Charlotte Summers
- Edward Kimber – The Life and Adventures of Joe Thompson
- Charlotte Lennox – The Life of Harriot Stuart
- Robert Paltock – The Life and Adventures of Peter Wilkins
- Sarah Scott – The History of Cornelia

=== Drama ===
- Kitty Clive – The Rehearsal, or, Bays in Petticoats
- Carlo Goldoni
  - La Bottega di Caffe (The Coffee Shop)
  - Il bugiardo (The Liar)
  - I pettegolezzi delle donne (Women's Gossip)
  - Il teatro comico (The comic theatre)
  - Il vero amico (The True Friend)
- William Shirley – Edward the Black Prince
- Voltaire – Oreste
- William Whitehead – The Roman Father

=== Poetry ===
- William Collins – The Passions
- Thomas Cooke – An Ode on Martial Virtue
- Robert Dodsley – The Oeconomy of Human Life
- Mary Jones – Miscellanies
- Thomas Warton – The Triumph of Isis
- Edward Young – The Complaint (a.k.a. Night Thoughts)

=== Non-fiction ===
- John Barrow – Navigatio Britannica
- William Blackstone – An Essay on Collateral Consanguinity
- Samuel Bownas – A Description of the Qualifications Necessary to a Gospel Minister
- John Campbell – The Present State of Europe
- Zachary Grey – A Free and Familiar Letter to William Warburton
- Eliza Haywood – A Present for Women Addicted to Drinking (on the Gin crisis)
- Francis Hutcheson – Reflections Upon Laughter (philosophy of humor)
- Jean-Jacques Rousseau – Discourse on the Arts and Sciences
- George Savile, 1st Marquess of Halifax (died 1695), edited by Alexander Pope – A Character of King Charles the Second: and political, moral and miscellaneous thoughts and reflections
- Laurence Sterne – The Abuses of Conscience
- Madeleine de Puisieux – La Femme n’est pas inférieure à l'homme (Woman is not inferior to man)

== Births ==
- January 7 – Robert Anderson, Scottish critic (died 1803)
- June 13 – James Burney, English rear-admiral and naval writer (died 1821)
- September 5 – Robert Fergusson, Scottish poet writing in Braid Scots (died 1774)
- October 21 – Juraj Fándly, Slovak non-fiction writer, entomologist and priest (died 1811)
- October 31 – Leonor de Almeida Portugal, 4th Marquise of Alorna, Portuguese noblewoman, painter, and poet (died 1839)
- unknown date – Henrietta Maria Bowdler, English author and expurgator (died 1830)

== Deaths ==
- February 8 – Aaron Hill, English dramatist (born 1685)
- May 3 – John Willison, Scottish Christian writer (born 1680)
- June 15 – Marguerite De Launay, Baronne Staal, French writer (born 1684)
- November 11 – Apostolo Zeno, Venetian poet and journalist (born 1668)
- November 18 – Susanna Highmore, English poet (born 1690)
