= Luigi Vestri =

Italian dramatic actor

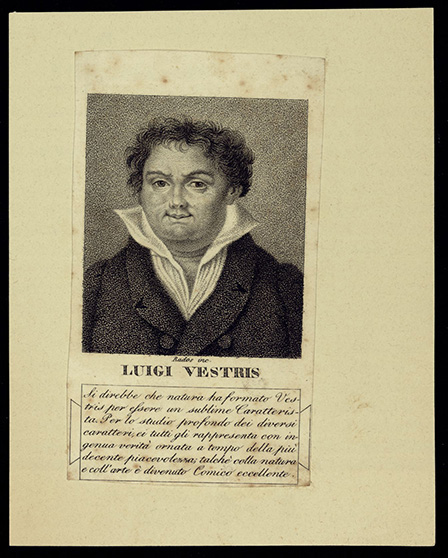
Portrait, in Archivio Storico Ricordi

Luigi Vestri (25 April 1781 – 19 August 1842) was an Italian dramatic actor.

== Biography ==
He was born in Florence to a civil servant, Cancelliere Gaetano Vestri, who intended for his son to follow him in his career. He was educated by the Calasanzi fathers. But Luigi was neither interested in administrative or medical trades. He gained acclaim in Florence for reciting dramatic roles. In the turbulent era of Napoleonic invasions, Luigi was briefly jailed, and fled from Florence. By age 21 he had joined the theatrical company of Consoli e Zuccato, which included the actor Giovanni Angelo Canova. In 1806, this theatrical company moved to that of Andrea Bianchi, for which one of the actors was it:Giuseppe De Marini. The company moved from Ferrara to Venice, playing in the theater of San Benedetto. The Bianchi company moved to join that of the Dorati, which included Paolo Belli Blanes. In 1816, they moved to Rome to perform in the Teatro Valle. Over the next decade, Vestri performed in Naples, Turin and Bologna with various artistic companies. Among the works he performed in were Il Burbero Benefico and Il vero amico by Carlo Goldoni; and L'ajo nell'imbarazzo later adapted by Donezetti into an opera.

He died in Bologna, and was memorialized by a marble bust by Lorenzo Bartolini in the Certosa. He was survived by five children.

== Bibliography ==
- Simoncini, Francesca (2020). "VESTRI, Luigi". Dizionario Biografico degli Italiani (in Italian). Vol. 99: Verrazzano–Vittorio Amedeo. Rome: Istituto dell'Enciclopedia Italiana. ISBN 978-88-12-00032-6.
