= Il mondo della luna (Avondano) =

Opera by Pedro António Avondano

Il mondo della luna is a 1765 opera by Pedro António Avondano, which was the first opera by a Portuguese composer to be performed in the Portuguese court. The libretto by Carlo Goldoni had been written originally for a setting by Galuppi in 1750.

== Recording ==
- Avondano: Il mondo della luna - Artistic directors: Marta Araújo, Marcos Magalhães; Os Músicos do Tejo, Teatro Nacional de São Carlos, Lisbon 1994; Naxos CD: 8.660487-88
