= Os Músicos do Tejo =

Os Músicos do Tejo (The Musicians of the River Tagus) are a Portuguese early music group founded in 2005. The ensemble's co-founders and regular conductors are Marcos Magalhães (harpsichord and musical director) and Marta Araújo (harpsichord and production director). The ensemble's programmes include «Foi Por Mim», «As Árias de Luísa Todi» and «Sementes do Fado».

== Discography ==
- Francisco António de Almeida. La Spinalba ovvero il Vecchio Matto (Dramma comico, Lisbon 1739). Naxos 8.66031921 (3 CDs, November 2012).
- Il mondo della luna (Avondano) 2020
