= Vestri =

Vestri may refer to:

- Austri, Vestri, Norðri and Suðri, dwarfs in Nordic mythology
- Íþróttafélagið Vestri, an Icelandic sports club
  - Vestri (football club)
  - Vestri men's basketball

People with the surname:

- Archimede Vestri, Italian patriot and architect of the 19th century
- Luigi Vestri (1781 – 1842), Italian dramatic actor
- René Vestri (1938–2013), French politician

== See also ==
- Vestris (disambiguation)
- Vestry
