= Pedro António Avondano =

Portuguese composer

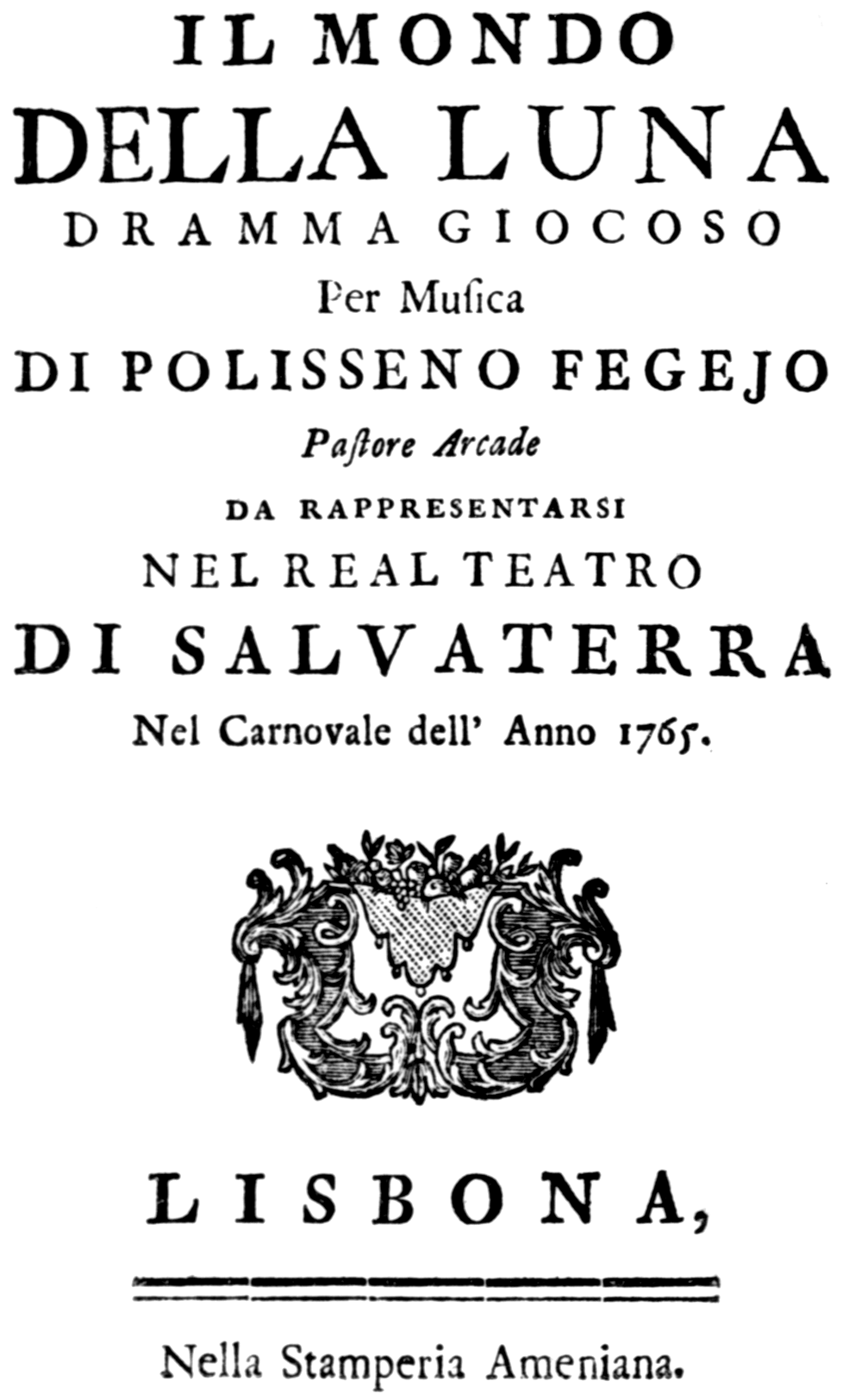
Pedro Avondano - Il mondo della luna - title page of the libretto - Lisboa 1765

Pedro António Avondano (16 April 1714 - 1782) was a Portuguese composer of Italian parentage.

Pedro António was born and died in Lisbon. His father Pietro Giorgio Avondano of Genoa, was a violinist at the court of João V, one of many Italian musicians at the Portuguese court.

Pedro António Avondano is mainly noted, like Domenico Scarlatti, for his harpsichord sonatas and sacred music.

== Works, editions and recordings ==
- comic opera Il mondo della luna, with libretto by Carlo Goldoni
- oratorio Il voto di Jefte
- oratorio Adamo ed Eva
- sacred works, inc. Tantum ergo
- sinfonie

Editions

- Forty-nine Lisbon minuets by Pedro Antonio Avondano ed. Mary Farrar Hatchette, Tulane University of Louisiana, 1971 - 334 pages.

Recordings

- Avondano. Sonata in C major. Sousa Carvalho. Toccata in G minor, Allegro in D major. Ruggero Gerlin (harpsichord). Philips © 835769I.Y LP, 1967
- Harpsichord works. Rosana Lanzelotte. Portugaler, 2006.
- Il mondo della luna, Naxos, 2020
- La Morte d'Abel, Presto Music, 2023

Some of Avondano's works were revived at the Festival d'Ambronay in 2006.
