= Le pescatrici =

Opera (dramma giocoso) by Joseph Haydn

- dramma giocoso by Joseph Haydn
- Portrait of the composer by Thomas Hardy, in 1791
- Translation: The Fisherwomen
- Librettist: Carlo Goldoni
- Language: Italian
- Premiere: 16 September 1770; Eszterháza

Le pescatrici (The Fisherwomen) Hob. 28/4, is an opera (dramma giocoso) in three acts by Joseph Haydn set to a libretto by Carlo Goldoni. Originally composed as part of the wedding celebrations of Maria Theresa Countess Lamberg, the opera was first performed on 16 September 1770 in the court theatre at Eszterháza.

== Background and performance history ==
Le pescatrici was the second of the three Goldoni libretti that Haydn set to music — the other two were Lo speziale (1768) and Il mondo della luna (1777). However, Haydn was not the first to use Goldoni's libretto. It had previously been used for operas by Ferdinando Bertoni (Venice, 1751) and Niccolò Piccinni (Rome 1766) and was later used by Florian Leopold Gassmann (Vienna, 1771). Haydn composed Le pescatrici as part of the lavish celebrations for the marriage of Prince Nikolaus Esterházy's niece, Maria Theresa Countess Lamberg to Alois Count Poggi at Eszterháza where the opera was first performed on 16 September 1770. The roles of Lesbina and Frisellino were first sung by Maria Magdalena Spangler and her husband, Carl Friberth, two prominent court singers at Eszterháza. Carl Friberth may also have had a hand in adapting Goldoni's libretto for Haydn.

A third of the original score was then destroyed in a fire at Esterháza in 1779. It was later reconstructed in 1965 by the Haydn scholar by H.C. Robbins Landon and the composer Karl Heinz Füssl. Since then the opera has had occasional revivals, most notably in Amsterdam on 15 June 1965; in Paris on 29 June 1967 when it received its first radio broadcast; in Metz on 1 February 1985; and at Garsington Opera in June 1997.

The bicentenary of Haydn's death in 2009 saw several performances of the work. In February 2009, it was performed at the Vienna Kammeroper. It was also performed by Bampton Classical Opera in English translation in July of that year, followed by performances in London's Wigmore Hall in September. The opera received its US premiere in New Brunswick, New Jersey at the Rutgers University Nicholas Music Center on 30 October 2009.

== Roles ==
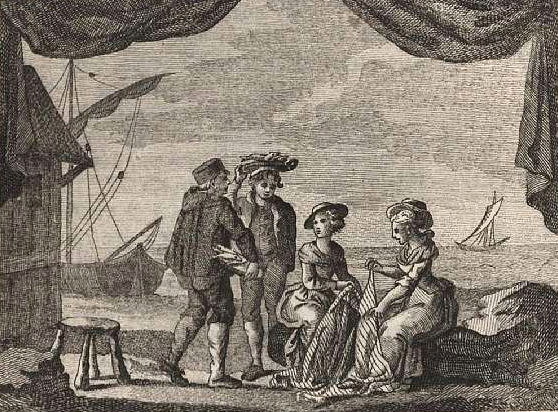
Illustration of Act 1, Scene 1 from Carlo Goldoni's libretto for Le pescatrici

Role	Voice type	Premiere cast 16 September 1770
Lesbina, a fisherwoman, Burlotto's sister and Frisellino's girlfriend	soprano	Maria Magdalena Spangler
Nerina, a fisherwoman, Frisellino's sister and Burlotto's girlfriend	soprano	Barbara Fux-Dichtler
Burlotto, a young fisherman	tenor	Leopold Dichter
Frisellino, a young fisherman	tenor	Carl Friberth
Eurilda, believed to be the daughter of Mastricco	contralto	Gertruda Cellini
Mastricco, an old fisherman	bass	Giacomo Lambertini
Lindoro, Prince of Sorrento	bass	Christian Specht

== Synopsis ==
The story is set in Taranto and concerns the Prince of Sorrento's search for Prince Casimiro's rightful heir who had been taken to Taranto as a baby after her father's murder. Two young fisherwomen in the village, Lesbina and Nerina, each believe they might be the missing princess. Although they are engaged to each other's brother (also fishermen), they both dream of marrying a wealthy man and set their caps for Prince Lindoro. The real princess turns out to be the dignified Eurilda, whom everyone had thought was the daughter of the elderly fisherman, Mastriccio. Upon discovering this, Lindoro asks for her hand in marriage and departs for Sorrento with Eurilda and her adopted father. The squabbling pairs of lovers, Lesbina and Frisellino and Nerina and Burlotto are eventually reunited but not before Frisellino and Burlotto embarrass Lesbina and Nerina by disguising themselves as cousins of Prince Lindoro and persuading them to elope.

== Recordings ==
A complete recording of Le pescatrici using the reconstructed score by H.C. Robbins Landon with Olga Geczy conducting the Lithuanian Opera Orchestra was released on the Hungaroton label in July 2009.

== Sources ==
- Bampton Classical Opera, Le Pescatrici. Accessed 4 November 2009.
- Casaglia, Gherardo (2005). "Le pescatrici". L'Almanacco di Gherardo Casaglia (in Italian).
- Federal Chancellery of Austria, "Haydn-Jahr 09: 'Le pescatrici – The Fisher Girls' at Vienna Chamber Opera House", 16 February 2009. Accessed 4 November 2009.
- Green, Rebecca, "Representing the Aristocracy: The Operatic Haydn and Le pescatrici" in Elaine Rochelle Sisman (ed.), Haydn and his World, Princeton University Press, 1997, pp 154-200. ISBN 0-691-05799-0
- Hunter, Mary, "Friberth, Carl", Grove Music Online ed. L. Macy (Accessed 3 November 2009), Accessed 4 November 2009 via subscription).
- Kennedy, Michael, "Garden guerrillas declare war", Daily Telegraph, 21 June 1997. Accessed 4 November 2009.
- Reich, Ronni, "Rutgers stages 'reconstructed' version of Haydn's 'Le Pescatrici' with Musica Raritana", New Jersey Star-Ledger, 2 November 2009. Accessed 4 November 2009.
- Webster, James, "Haydn, (Franz) Joseph", Grove Music Online ed. L. Macy. Accessed 4 November 2009 via subscription)
