= Il trionfo d'amore (Almeida) =

Il Trionfo d'Amore is a scherzo pastorale by Francisco António de Almeida written to celebrate one of the two Saint name-days of King João V. The serenata was first performed on 27 December 1729 at the Ribeira Palace, on the feast of St John the Baptist. The plot concerns the wedding arrangements for Nerina to Adraste, which the gods’ frustrate because of her greater love for Arsindo.

== Recording ==
- Quintans, C. Mena, Seara, Voces Caelestes, Os Músicos do Tejo, Magalhães, Naxos
