= La Spinalba =

La Spinalba (Spinalba, ovvero Il vecchio matto, in English Spinalba or The Mad Old Man) is an opera (dramma comico) in three acts, with music by Francisco António de Almeida to an Italian-language libretto whose author is unknown. It was premiered in the Portuguese Carnival season of 1739 at the Palácio da Ribeira, Lisbon.

== Background ==
Almeida studied in Rome during the 1720s before returning to Lisbon.The opera, the only one of the three composed by him that survives intact, shows the influence of Giovanni Battista Pergolesi, whose La serva padrona was written six years earlier. His orchestra was similar to that of Alessandro Scarlatti, and, unusually for the time, none of the male roles in the opera were sung by castrati.

The opera, along with other works by the composer, was thought to have been lost in the 1755 Lisbon earthquake, but it was rediscovered in the 1960s.

== Performance history ==
After the rediscovery of the opera, the first modern performance took place at the Teatro Nacional de São Carlos, Lisbon, on 26 May 1965. It has since been performed in a number of other Portuguese towns and cities, including Porto in 2004, Lisbon, at the Centro Cultural de Belém in 2008 and Vigo in 2009. The first performance in Britain, by Phoenix Opera, took place at the Collegiate Theatre, London, on 28 March 1978, and performances were given by students of the Guildhall School of Music and Drama in 2010. A new studio recording of the complete opera by Os Músicos do Tejo was released by Naxos in 2012.

== Roles ==
Role	Voice type	Premiere Cast, Carnival, 1739 (Conductor: )
Spinalba, a young Florentine girl	soprano	
Arsenio, her father, a Florentine merchant	bass	
Dianora, her stepmother	mezzo-soprano	
Ippolito, a young Florentine, Spinalba's unfaithful lover	tenor	
Elisa, Arsenio's niece and Spinalba's cousin	soprano	
Leandro, a young nobleman, Elisa's lover and Ippolito's rival	tenor	
Vespina, Elisa's servant	soprano	
Togno, a gondolier and Leandro's servant	bass	

== Synopsis ==
Place: Rome
Time: The 18th century

=== Act 1 ===
Scene 1: Arsenio's house

Dianora asks Spinalba to explain why she had dressed up as a man and left home for two weeks. Spinalba's reply is that she wanted to spy on Ippolito, whom she had met in Florence but is now in Rome. She still loves him, but he has forgotten and abandoned her, and has fallen for her cousin Elisa. Dianora is apprehensive about the possible reaction of Arsenio when he hears Spinalba's story. Aria (Spinalba): "Con quante lusinghe l'infido incostante". She departs.

When Arsenio arrives, Dianora tells him that her daughter was visiting Elisa on her own, and had disguised herself as a man to protect herself. Arsenio is angry - Spinalba has brought shame on the family and it is Dianora's fault. Aria (Dianora): "Quando m'avrai perduta". Dianora leaves. Elisa arrives with Vespina, and denies that Spinalba had recently visited her, whether or not in disguise. Aria (Arsenio): "Eh, t'accheta, t'accheta". He leaves.

Elisa now confesses to Vespina that she is passionate about Florindo (Spinalba in disguise) and that she feels nothing for either Ippolito or Leandro. Ippolito reaffirms his love for Elisa and tries to make Vespina an ally, but the maid refuses to do anything to help him. Aria (Vespina): "Siete voi della Signora". She departs, leaving Ippolito alone. Aria (Ippolito): "Lieve fiamma, che semplice e cheta".

Scene 2: Elisa's garden

Leandro and Togno arrive by boat. Duet (Leandro and Togno): "Dicea la Madre di me zelosa/Poscia la nonna, la vecchia accorta". Leandro, nervous about courting Elisa, instructs Togno to take a message to her. He leaves. Aria (Leandro): "Dille che'l primo oggetto fu".

Dianora arrives and asks Togno whether he has recently seen a girl dressed as a man. No, he hasn't. She leaves and Arsenio appears, asking exactly the same question. This time, Togno pretends that he has, to Arsenio's bewilderment. After Arsenio has left, Vespina arrives and Togno tells her about the trick that he has played on Arsenio. They laugh so much that Togno forgets what he was supposed to say to Elisa.

Ippolito appears, takes Togno to be a rival suitor of Elisa and challenges him. Now Spinalba (disguised as Florindo) arrives in time to save Togno, and he escapes. Recitative and Aria (Togno): "E vuoi ammazzarmi, Signor, e perché?". "Florindo" tries to convince Ippolito that Elisa is not for him - how can she love him if she discovers that he has abandoned Spinalba? Duet (Spinalba and Ippolito): "Son questi i giuramenti?".

=== Act 2 ===
Scene 1: Elisa's garden

Dianora describes Arsenio's madness to Elisa and Vespina: the loss of his daughter has led him to go away with only some food wrapped in a handkerchief. She asks Elisa to convince Arsenio that Spinalba will return soon. Aria (Dianora): "Tu'l consola, tu l'invola del sentier". Elisa asks Vespina to help, but she has nothing to say.

Leandro and Ippolito challenge each other to a duel over Elisa, but she appears and calms them down. Aria (Elisa): "Sia ver che si desti frà voi tal cimento?". Ippolito departs. Aria (Ippolito): "Volle talor per gioco". Togno joins Leandro and tries to tell him that Arsenio is coming, but Leandro ignores him and goes away. Aria (Leandro): "Detesto il momento, in cui la mirai".

Arsenio, increasingly upset, confuses Togno with Charon, the mythological boatman who transports the souls of the dead across the Styx. He goes off to dress for the journey, first drawing a magic circle around Togno to stop him running away - if he does, he will be pursued by demons. Aria (Arsenio): "Re di Cocito, grave e severo". Togno, mesmerised, thinks that Vespina, who now arrives, is one of the Furies. Aria and recitative (Togno and Vespina): "Và sprofonda nell'inferno". He asks her to help him to escape from the circle, but she makes fun of him. However, she takes pity on him, and they arrange to meet in the garden in the evening.

Arsenio, still deluded, returns dressed as a sailor, and confuses Vespina with Calliope, a muse who will accompany him to the underworld. Aria (Vespina): "Tu sei'l desio di questo petto". Aria (Togno): "Come gira a gonfie viele".

Scene 2: the same

Elisa naively declares her love for "Florindo". The disguised Spinalba dare not reveal her secret, and urges Elisa to return to Leandro. Aria (Elisa): "Se tanto t'adoro". She departs. Aria (Spinalba): "Un cor, ch'ha per costume".

Night falls. Vespina, waiting for Togno, meets Dianora, who is looking for her husband. They hide as Togno and Arsenio arrive. Arsenio, now completely demented, mistakes Dianora for Proserpina, the goddess of the underworld. Quartet (Dianora, Vespina, Togno, Arsenio): "Non fuggirmi, o sposo amato".

=== Act 3 ===
Scene 1

Spinalba sends a message via Togno to ask Leandro not to leave the city. In due course, she will be compelled to reveal her true identity, and then Elisa will need her real suitor. Aria (Spinalba): "Quello sdegno, ch'è figlio d'amore".

Dianora, Elisa and Togno agree that the latter, disguised as a doctor, will try to cure Arsenio. Aria (Togno): "Basta porsi la gogniglia".

Elisa is still enamoured of "Florindo", but Dianora finally reveals that not only is he Spinalba in disguise but also that Spinalba loves Ippolito. Elisa decides to return to Leandro. Aria (Elisa): "Con innocente abbraccio vò stringerla al mio petto".

Ippolito and Leandro, agitated, ask Dianora about Elisa's intentions. Dianora tells them that one of them will be happy. Aria (Ippolito): "Veggio ben' io, per mia sventura". Leandro is in despair. Aria (Leandro): "M'accenni ch'io speri, mi scemi l'affanno".

Scene 2

Arsenio imagines that he is surrounded by a storm. When Togno and Dianora appear, he thinks that Togno, now disguised as a doctor, is Pluto and angrily refuses to take any medicine. Togno throws it in his face and Arsenio flees.

Vespina pretends not to recognise the disguised Togno and starts flirting with him, then tells him that Togno does not love her. Togno throws off his disguise, and a furious row develops. Duet (Vespina and Togno): "Perché così sdegnato, se l'amor mio tu sei?".

Dianora finds Arsenio and tells him that his daughter will soon arrive. Aria (Dianora): "Io farò ch'ai piedi tuoi". Togno and Vespina are reconciled. Aria (Vespina): "Io bramo il cor contento".

In the final scene, Arsenio gradually returns to his senses, and when Spinalba removes her disguise and apologises to him, he becomes his old self. Leandro is taken back by Elisa, Ippolito asks Spinalba to forgive him, and Vespina accepts Togno's marriage proposal. Ensemble (All): "Fugga il duol, regni la pace".

== Recording ==
Year	Cast: (Spinalba, Elisa, Dianora, Vespina, Ippolito, Leandro, Arsenio, Togno)	Conductor, Orchestra, Chorus	Label
1969	Lidia Marimpietri, Laura Zannini, Rena Garazioti, Romana Righetti, Ugo Benelli, Fernando Serafin, Otello Borgonovo, Teodoro Rivetta	Gianfranco Rivoli, Orchestra da Camera Gulbenkian	3 LPs: Philips
2011	Ana Quintans, Inês Madeira, Cátia Moreso, Joana Seara, Fernando Guimarães, Mário Alves, Luís Rodrigues, João Fernandes	Marcos Magalhães, Os Músicos do Tejo	3 CDs: Naxos Records
