= The Boors =

Comedy by Carlo Goldoni

The Boors, also known as The Cantankerous Men (Venetian: I rusteghi), is a comedy by Carlo Goldoni. It was first performed at the San Luca theatre of Venice towards the end of the Carnival in 1760. It was published in 1762. The boors are four merchants of Venice, who represent the old conservative, puritanical tradition of the Venetian middle classes, who are pitted against Venice's "new frivolity".

== Bibliography ==
- Holme, Timothy (1976). A Servant of Many Masters: The Life and Times of Carlo Goldoni. London: Jupiter. ISBN 0-904041-61-1.
