= Il mondo della luna (Galuppi) =

Opera by Baldassare Galuppi

- Opera by Baldassare Galuppi
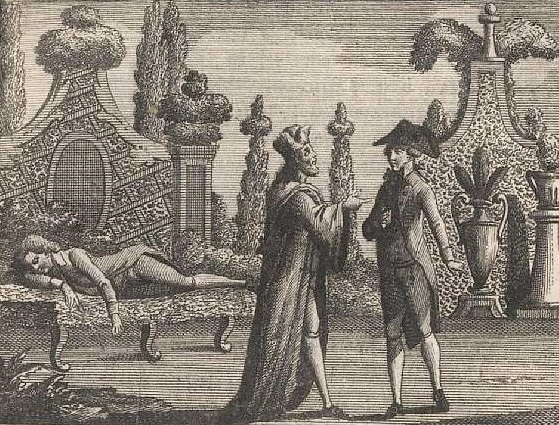
- Illustration from the 1794 publication of Goldoni's libretto
- Librettist: Carlo Goldoni
- Language: Italian
- Premiere: 29 January 1750; Teatro San Moisè, Venice

Il mondo della luna (The World of the Moon) is an opera (dramma giocoso) in 3 acts by Baldassare Galuppi. The Italian-language libretto was by Carlo Goldoni. It premiered on 29 January 1750 at the Teatro San Moisè, Venice.

The music has been described as "clear, with expressivity obtained through melodic and textural changes." Galuppi's music exploits "the capacity of the music to illustrate and portray the text," with special attention for Buonafede, credulous old man who is the central character of the plot.

The opera by Galuppi is the first based on Goldoni's libretto. The same libretto was later also set by several other composers, such as Pedro António Avondano (1765), Giovanni Paisiello (1774 under the title Il credulo deluso, 1783), Gennaro Astarita (1774), Joseph Haydn (1777), Michele Neri Bondi (1790, libretto revised by Domenico Somigli), and Marcos Portugal (1791, in Portuguese, under the title O lunático iludido). Paisiello composed four different versions of operas based on this libretto (one of them, 1783, was a reduction in two acts by Marco Coltellini; another, 1774, was performed as Il credulo deluso).

== Roles ==
Roles, voice types, premiere cast
Role	Voice type	Premiere cast, 29 January 1750 (Conductor: – )
Ecclitico, a would-be astrologer	bass	Alessandro Renda
Buonafede, credulous man	bass	Francesco Baglioni
Flaminia, daughter of Buonafede	soprano	Dionisia Lepri
Clarice, another daughter of Buonafede	contralto	Serafina Penni
Lisetta, maid	soprano	Costanza Russignuoli
Ernesto	soprano (breeches role)	Berenice Penni
Cecco, servant of Ernesto	bass	Francesco Carrattoli

== Synopsis ==
See synopsis in Haydn's Il mondo della luna.

== Recordings ==
1997: Franco Piva, Intermusica Ensemble, Bongiovanni Cat: 2217/19

Ecclittico: Giorgio Gatti
Buonafede: Gastone Sarti
Flaminia: Paola Antonucci
Clarice: Barbara di Castri

Lisetta: Patrizia Cigna
Ernesto: Enrico Pacini
Cecco: Claudio Ottino
