= The Liar (Goldoni play) =

Comedy by Carlo Goldoni

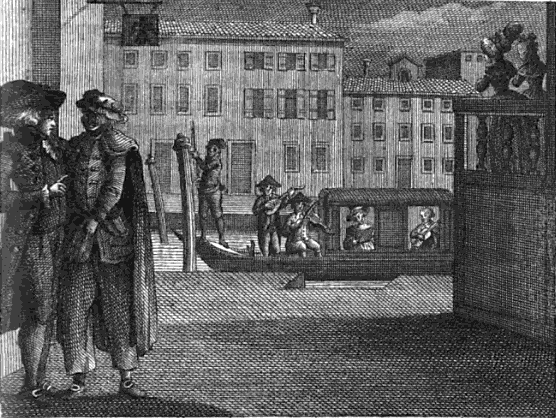
- Opening scene of The Liar
- Original language: Venetian
- Written by: Carlo Goldoni
- Characters: Lelio, the Liar; Arlecchino, his servant Pantalone, his father Doctor Balanzone; Rosaura and Beatrice, his daughters Columbina, their maidservant Florindo, assistant to Balanzone, in love with Rosaura; Brighella, his friend, in love with Colombina; Ottavio, in love with Beatrice

Premiere
- Date: 1750-51
- Place: Teatro Sant' Angelo in Venice

The Liar (Italian: Il bugiardo) is a comedy by Carlo Goldoni. It was written as part of Goldoni's fulfilment of a boast that he had inserted into the epilogue to one of his plays that for the next season he would write sixteen comedies. The Liar, along with the fifteen other comedies, was staged in the 1750–51 season at the Teatro San Angelo in Venice. It draws on commedia dell'arte conventions and stock characters.

== Plot ==
Lelio, a Venetian who has spent years away from home, returns to Venice. He courts the two daughters of Doctor Balanzone, Beatrice and Rosaura, without telling them which one he really loves. Meanwhile, each girl has another suitor, Florindo for Rosaura and Ottavio for Beatrice. Florindo is shy, however, and will not tell Rosaura that he loves her. This allows Lelio to concoct fabulous lies and convince Rosaura that he wishes to marry her. Meanwhile, Lelio's servant Arlecchino tries to woo the Doctor's servant Columbina away from Brighella, Florindo's friend.

Lelio's lies get him into deeper and deeper trouble with the girls, their father, and his own father Pantalone. At the end, it is revealed that while in Rome he married a Roman lady, Cleonice Anselmi. He departs to go to her, leaving Rosaura and Beatrice free to marry Florindo and Ottavio, and Columbina free to marry Brighella.

== Bibliography ==
- Holme, Timothy (1976). A Servant of Many Masters: The Life and Times of Carlo Goldoni. London: Jupiter. ISBN 0-904041-61-1.
