= Francisco António de Almeida =

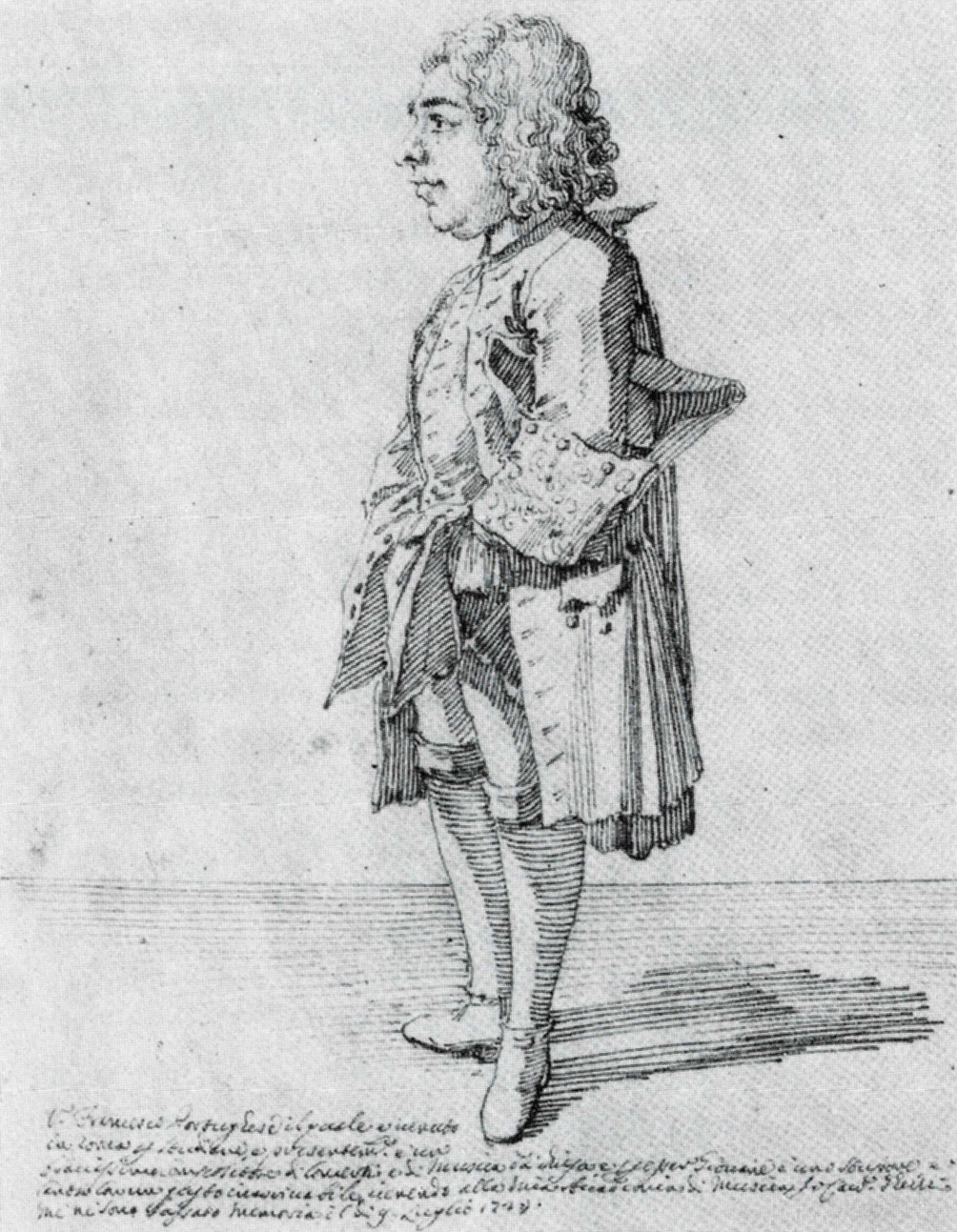
- Born: 1702
- Died: 1754 (aged 51–52); Sacavém, Portugal
- Occupations: composer, organist
- Notable work: La Spinalba
- Style: Baroque music

Francisco António de Almeida (c. 1702–1754) was a Portuguese composer and organist, standing as one of the greatest names in Portuguese Baroque music.

== Career ==
From 1722 to 1726 he was a royal scholar in Rome. In 1724, Pier Leone Ghezzi drew his caricature, describing him as "a young but excellent composer of concertos and church music who sang with extreme taste". He returned to Portugal in 1726, where he became organist of the Royal and Patriarchal Chapel.

In 1728, the first of his serenatas, Il trionfo della virtù, was performed in Lisbon at the palace of Cardinal João da Mota e Silva. The serenata for six voices, Il Trionfo d’Amore, was first performed at the Ribeira Palace on 27th December 1729, the feast of St. John the Baptist, with King John V in attendance. His comic opera, La pazienza di Socrate, was performed at the royal palace in 1733 and it was the first Italian opera in Portugal.

He was hired by the King to teach the harpsichord to the young Infanta Barbara of Portugal.

A contemporary diarist states that Almeida composed music for the popular performances of presépios (Nativity scenes) in the Mouraria quarter of Lisbon.

== Death ==
Despite claims of him dying in the Lisbon earthquake of 1755, the composer actually died a year earlier on the 3rd of October in Sacavém, and was buried in the Hermitage of Our Lady of Victory.

== Selected works ==
- Il pentimento di Davidde (componimento sacro), 1722
- La Giuditta (oratorio), 1726 (first modern performances were in 1990, and it was described as a masterpiece.
- Il trionfo della virtù (componimento poetico), 1728
- Il trionfo d'amore (Almeida) (scherzo pastorale), 1729
- Gl'incanti d'Alcina (dramma per musica da cantarsi), 1730
- La Spinalba, ovvero Il vecchio matto (dramma comico), 1739
- L’Ippolito (serenata), 1752

== Bibliography ==
- Manuel Carlos de Brito: Almeida, Francisco António de, Grove Music Online ed. L. Macy (Retrieved 2007-05-05), Grove Music Online
- Manuel Carlos de Brito: Opera in Portugal in the Eighteenth Century (Cambridge, 1989)

== See also ==
- Carlos Seixas
- António Teixeira
