= Discourse on the Arts and Sciences =

Essay by Jean-Jacques Rousseau

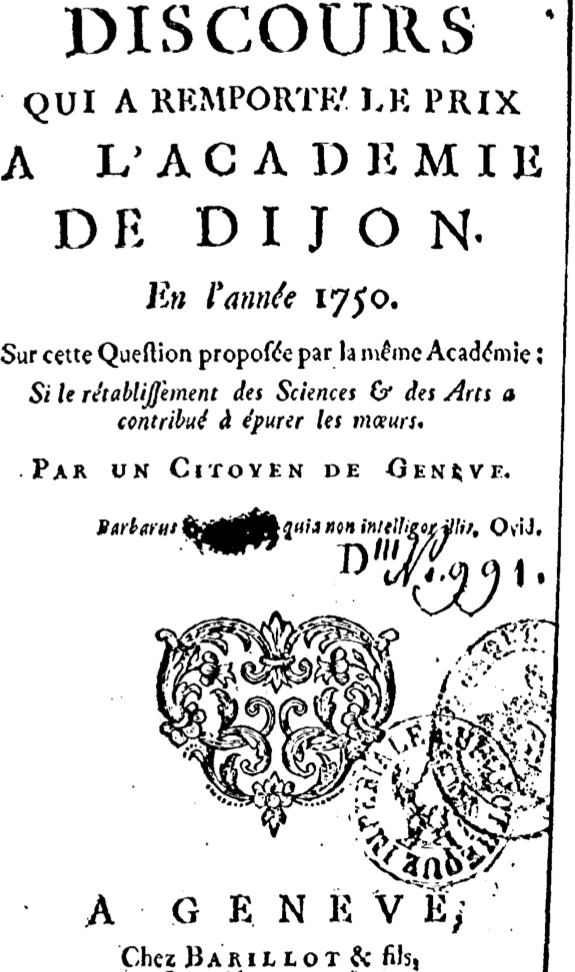
- Original edition
- Author: Jean-Jacques Rousseau
- Original title: Discours sur les sciences et les arts
- Language: French
- Publisher: Geneva, Barillot & fils [i. e. Paris, Noël-Jacques Pissot]
- Publication date: 1750
- Publication place: France
- English publication date: London, W. Owen, 1751

A Discourse on the Moral Effects of the Arts and Sciences (1750), also known as Discourse on the Sciences and Arts (French: Discours sur les sciences et les arts) and commonly referred to as The First Discourse, is an essay by Genevan philosopher Jean-Jacques Rousseau which argued that the arts and sciences corrupt human morality. It was Rousseau's first successfully published philosophical work, and it was the first expression of his influential views about nature vs. society, to which he would dedicate the rest of his intellectual life. This work is considered one of his most important works.

== Topic of the essay ==
Rousseau wrote Discourse in response to an advertisement that appeared in the October 1749 issue of Mercure de France, in which the Academy of Dijon set a prize for an essay responding to the question: "Has the restoration of the sciences and arts contributed to the purification of morals?" According to Rousseau in his Confessions, "Within an instant of reading this [advertisement], I saw another universe and became another man." Rousseau had found the idea to which he would passionately dedicate the rest of his intellectual life: the destructive influence of civilization on human beings. Rousseau felt a sudden and overwhelming inspiration "that man is naturally good, and that it is from these institutions alone that men become wicked". Rousseau was able to retain only some of the thoughts, the "crowd of truths", that flowed from that idea—these eventually found their way into his Discourses and his novel Émile. Rousseau's First Discourse drew inspiration, from a variety of sources, and even copied passages from other works without inspiration. Some of these sources include Montesquieu's Spirit of the Laws and Plutarch's Lives. The line with which Rousseau opens the discourse is a quote in Latin from Horace's On the Art of Poetry (line 25), which translates into: "We are deceived by the appearance of right."

According to Rousseau, the arts and sciences were accompanied by the corruption of morals. Before civilisation, humans lived "rustic but natural" lives untainted by the "perfidious veil of politeness", and by "all those vicious ornaments" of fashion. Using examples from Athens, Sparta, and Rome, Rousseau wrote that the arts and sciences sap humans of their virtue and ability to defend against invasion. Rousseau argued that human civilisation has become decadent as a result of their own cultural progress. However, Rousseau did not provide a clear account of how cultural progress had led to this decline.

In his work Rousseau, Judge of Jean-Jacques, Rousseau used a fictional Frenchman as a literary device to lay out his intent in the Discourse on the Arts and Sciences and his other systematic works. The character explains that Rousseau was showing the "great principle that nature made man happy and good, but that society depraves him and makes him miserable....vice and error, foreign to his constitution, enter it from outside and insensibly change him." The character describes the Discourse on the Arts and Sciences as an effort "to destroy that magical illusion which gives us a stupid admiration for the instruments of our misfortunes and [an attempt] to correct that deceptive assessment that makes us honor pernicious talents and scorn useful virtues. Throughout he makes us see the human race as better, wiser, and happier in its primitive constitution; blind, miserable, and wicked to the degree that it moves away from it. His goal is to rectify the error of our judgements in order to delay the progress of our vices, and to show us that where we seek glory and renown, we in fact find only error and miseries".

An example of one of "those metaphysical subtleties" that Rousseau may have been referring to was the consideration of materialism or Epicureanism. Scholar Victor Gourevitch, examining Rousseau's Letter to Voltaire, notes: "Although he returns to the problem of materialism throughout his life, Rousseau does not ever discuss it at any length. He chooses to write from the perspective of the ordinary course of things, and philosophical materialism breaks with the ordinary course of things. It is what he early called one of those metaphysical subtleties that do not directly affect the happiness of mankind".

Rousseau went on to win first prize in the contest and—in an otherwise mundane career as composer and playwright, among other things—he had newfound fame as a philosopher. Scholar Jeff J.S. Black points out that Rousseau is one of the first thinkers within the modern democratic tradition to question the political commitment to scientific progress found in most modern societies (especially liberal democracies) and examined the costs of such policies. In the Discourse on the Arts and Sciences, Rousseau "authored a scathing attack on scientific progress...an attack whose principles he never disavowed, and whose particulars he repeated, to some extent, in each of his subsequent writings."

== Response ==
Rousseau anticipated that his essay would cause "a universal outcry against [him]", but held that "a few sensible men" would appreciate his position. He holds that this will be because he has dismissed the concerns of "men born to be in bondage to the opinions of the society in which they live in." In this he includes "wits" and "those who follow fashion". He maintains that those who reflexively support ways of thinking that mirror the times they live in merely "play the free-thinker and the philosopher", and had they lived during the age of the French Wars of Religion these same people would have joined the Catholic League and "been no more than fanatics" advocating the use of force to suppress Protestants.

Rousseau's argument was controversial, and drew a great number of responses. One from critic Jules Lemaître (1853–1914) called the instant deification of Rousseau as "one of the strongest proofs of human stupidity." Several critics argued that the idea of an ancient golden age was a myth, and argued that Rousseau failed to indicate at what point humans' moral decline occurred. Rousseau himself answered five of his critics in the two years or so after he won the prize. Among these five answers were replies to Stanisław Leszczyński, former King of Poland, the Abbé Raynal, and the "Last Reply" to the philosopher Charles Borde. These responses provide clarification for Rousseau's argument in the First Discourse, and begin to develop a theme he further advances in the Discourse on Inequality – that misuse of the arts and sciences is one case of a larger theme, that man, by nature good, is corrupted by civilization. Inequality, luxury, and the political life are identified as especially harmful. Critics also noted that Rousseau did not offer any solutions to the corruption of human morals. Rousseau acknowledged this, noting that he had only tried to locate its sources rather than to find a solution.

Oddly, Rousseau, who claims to be motivated by the idea of bringing forth something to promote the happiness of mankind, sets most of humanity as his adversaries. Scholar Jeff J. S. Black points out that this is because Rousseau wants his work to outlive him. Rousseau holds that if he wrote things that were popular with the fashionable and trendy, his work would fade with the passing of fashion, "To live beyond one's century, then, one must appeal to principles that are more lasting and to readers who are less thoughtless."

Rousseau's own assessment of his First Discourse was ambiguous. In one letter he described it as one of his "principal writings," and one of only three in which his philosophical system is developed (the others being the Discourse on Inequality and Émile), but in another instance he evaluated it as "at best mediocre."
