= La putta onorata =

Comedy play by Carlo Goldoni

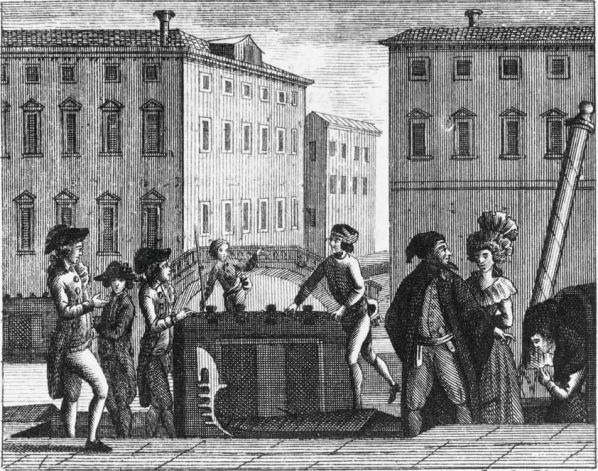
La putta onorata, Goldoni play

La putta onorata ("The honorable maiden") is a comedy play by Venetian playwright Carlo Goldoni. It was published in 1748. It is rooted to the styles of the commedia dell'arte. The play was applauded in the theater Sant'Angelo in the carnival of 1749 for 22 nights in a row.

Characters include Beatrice, Ottavio, Brighella, Menego, Bettina, Pasqualino, Catte, Pantalone, Arlecchino, Pasqua, Nane, Lelio, Tita and Scanna. Nane and Menego are two gondoliers who are eternally quarreling.

In 1968 it was made into a comedy film directed by Carlo Lodovici and starring Cesco Baseggio, Lia Zoppelli and Wanda Bendetti.
