= Gl'innamorati =

Play by Carlo Goldoni

Gl' Innamorati
- Original language: Italian
- Written by: Carlo Goldoni
- Genre: Comedy
- Setting: Milan

Premiere
- Place: Teatro San Luca in Venetia

Gl'innamorati ('The Lovers', also spelled as Gli innamorati) is a 1759 comedy play by Carlo Goldoni.

Goldoni wrote the comedy during a 7 months stay in Rome, drawing inspiration for the story and its main characters from the daughter of his Roman landlord Maddalena Poloni and her fiancé Bartolommeo Pinto. The comedy was first represented for eight consecutive nights at the Teatro San Luca in Venice between November and December 1759.

Goldoni wrote it as part of his unfinished project Nove muse ('Nine Muses'), a planned cycle of nine unrelated plays, each dedicated to a different Muse; Gl'innamorati was dedicated to Thalia, the Muse of Comedy. A parody of the upper classes, it is regarded as a rare Italian play of the period not spoken in a dialect but in a "literary register of Tuscan-based Italian".

== Synopsis ==
A year has passed in 18th century Milan since Eugenia Ridolfi, heiress of a ruined family, has begun meeting Fulgentius, young, upper middle-class man. They are deeply in love, but the relationship is troubled because of his impulsivity and, especially, her jealousy. For example, Eugenia does not bear Fulgentius to visit his sister-in-law Clorinda, though he's obliged to do so because his brother has left for Genoa due to his job, and he must stay with her until he returns. So the couple repeatedly break up and make up.

Meanwhile, count Roberto of Otricoli, a friend of Fabrizio's (Eugenia's uncle, whose obsession is art) arrives in Milan and visits the Ridolfis. Fabrizio, who doesn't want to be outdone, invites him to lunch, despite the disastrous economic situation of the family. Eugenia tells Roberto, who has fallen in love with her, that she loves another man, but Fulgentius is jealous and threatens to commit suicide. Eugenia declares her love for him, and the two make up, but Fabrizio has invited Clorinda to lunch. Eugenia, exasperated and jealous, insults the woman and storms off.

Two servants, Lisetta and Tognino, peek through the keyhole and observe the dramatic lunch, argument and umpteenth break-up between Fulgentius and Eugenia, who angrily accepts a proposal from Roberto. Fabrizio, who likes Fulgentius, tries forbids Eugenia from marrying Roberto, but she is torn. Fulgentius returns with good news: his brother has returned from Genoa, Clorinda is again under the protection of her husband, and Fulgentius can now marry Eugenia. Eugenia, desperate, is forced to tell Fulgentius that she is now engaged. In the face of his accusations, she faints. Her sister Flamminia soon give her wonderful news: she told Roberto the situation, and he broke the engagement with Eugenia. Fulgentius marries Eugenia, and Fabrizio does not require a dowry.

== Characters ==
- Eugenia Ridolfi
- Fulgentius
- Fabrizio
- Count Roberto of Otricoli
- Clorinda Corradi
- Flamminia Ridolfi

== Reception ==
Routledge's Encyclopedia of Italian Literary Studies wrote Gl'innamorati is "rightly considered one of his [Goldoni's] masterpieces for its power to capture all the nuances of its two protagonists' souls."
