= Dorati =

Dorati, Doráti is a surname. Notable people with the surname include:

- Antal Doráti (1906–1988), Hungarian-born conductor and composer who became an American citizen
- Nicolao Dorati (c. 1513–1593), Italian composer and trombonist
