= Il cavaliere e la dama =

Comedy play by Carlo Goldoni

Il cavaliere e la dama is a comedy play by Venetian playwright Carlo Goldoni. It was published in 1749.
