= Gli amori di Zelinda e Lindoro =

Play written by Carlo Goldoni

Gli amori di Zelinda e Lindoro is a comedy play by Venetian playwright Carlo Goldoni. It was published in 1763.
