= Il feudatario =

Comedy play by Carlo Goldoni

Il feudatario is a three-act comedy play by the Venetian playwright Carlo Goldoni. It was published in 1752.
