= Giacomo Maccari =

Italian opera composer

Giacomo Maccari (Rome, c. 1700 – Venice, after 1744) was an Italian opera composer.

== Works ==
- Adaloaldo furioso (melodramma, libretto di Antonio Maria Lucchini, carnevale 1727, Venezia)
- La pupilla (intermezzo, libretto di Carlo Goldoni, 1734, Venezia)
- Il conte Copano (intermezzo, libretto di Antonio Gori e Giuseppe Imer, 1734, Venezia)
- Ottaviano trionfante di Marc'Antonio (dramma comico, libretto di P. Miti, carnevale 1735, Venezia)
- La fondazione di Venezia (divertimento per musica con prologo e 11 scene, libretto di Carlo Goldoni, autunno 1736, Venezia)
- Lucrezia Romana in Costantinopoli (dramma comico in tre atti, libretto di Carlo Goldoni, carnevale 1743, Venezia)
- La contessina (dramma per musica in tre atti, libretto di Carlo Goldoni, 26 dicembre 1742, Teatro San Samuele di Venezia)
- Cantata per contralto e basso continuo
