= The Antiquarian's Family =

1749 comedy by Carlo Goldoni

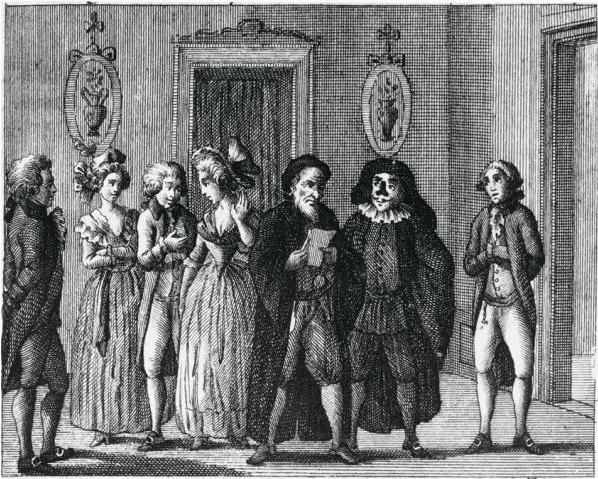
- Final scene of The Antiquarian's Family.
- Original language: Venetian
- Written by: Carlo Goldoni
- Characters: Count Anselmo Terrazzani, dilettante of antiquities Countess Isabella, his wife Count Giacinto, their son Doralice, daughter of Pantalone, married to Count Giacinto; Pantalone de' Bisognosi, a rich Venetian merchant The Cavaliere del Bosco; Doctor Anselmi, an old man, friend of Countess Isabella; Colombina, maid of Countess Isabella; Brighella, servant of Count Anselmo; Arlecchino, peasant and friend of Brighella; Pancrazio, appraiser of antiquities Servants of Count Anselmo
- Genre: Comedy

The Antiquarian's Family, or The Mother-in-law and the Daughter (La famiglia dell'antiquario, ossia La suocera e la nuora) is a comedy by Venetian author Carlo Goldoni, first published in 1749. Goldoni dedicated the play to the British consul Joseph Smith.

== Plot ==
=== Introduction ===
In the introduction, Goldoni introduces the plot and characters: Count Anselmo from Palermo, an antiquarian who spends his money on low value items that are presented to him as ancient and precious; his wife, now elderly but who poses as a young woman, who fights with her daughter; and her son, Count Giacinto, who asks in vain for help to pacify the two.

=== Act 1 ===
Count Anselmo is in his study admiring his precious "Pescennius," an ancient coin "so well survived that it seems to have been coined today". His servant Brighella arrives to bother him with certain debts he needs to pay and reprove him for throwing away his small fortune for household junk. His master accuses him of ignorance, and tells him that with the dowry from his son's marriage, they will not lack for money. His wife, Isabella, then complains to him for having accepted a merchant's daughter as a daughter-in-law — though she won't say no to the money from the dowry, which she used to redeem a precious ring that her husband had pawned for a loan. Anselmo reminds her that nobility is little use without money.

Doralice, the daughter-in-law, laments that even with such a large dowry, she is not given the money to buy a bridal gown, but Anselmo continues to think about his coin and doesn't care. The son, Giacinto, speaks up, but his father does not listen. Doralice reproves Giacinto for not being able to make his father care, and complains about Isabella's mistreatment of her, threatening to return to her father's house if she is not treated a little better. Giacinto promises her a dress, and she sends for Colombina, the countess's faithful maid. Colombina, however, shows her no respect and does not wish to obey, because Doralice is not noble; thus, the latter slaps her, and the maid decides to take revenge.

Giacinto asks his mother for money for the dress, but she gives him only six sequins, after having once again spoken badly of Doralice. After he has left, the doctor enters. He first defends the marriage of Isabella's son, but then begins to go along with the countess, as he always does. Colombina then enters, announcing the arrival of the Cavaliere del Bosco; Isabella sends away the doctor, and Colombina tells the countess that Doralice slapped her, exaggerating the facts. Isabella convinces the knight to try to speak reason to Doralice, but gets angry when he and Colombina make references to her age.

Brighella, together with Arlecchino, who is dressed as an Armenian, plans to trick his own master, Anselmo, selling him fake ancient artifacts. The two pretend to speak Armenian and convince Anselmo to pay 14 sequins for an ordinary oil lamp. Then they leave, and Pantalone, Doralice's father, arrives, complaining of the treatment his daughter is receiving. He also proves to be preoccupied by the fact that the count spends all the family's money on knick-knacks, but Anselmo does not listen, and he leaves. Doralice then arrives, complaining to her father of the treatment she is receiving; Pantalone, like her husband, tells her to be patient, and rebukes her for the slap. He gives her 50 sequins for the dress, and a gold watch.

The knight presents himself to Doralice, and unsuccessfully requests that she ask pardon for the slap. He offers her his services, trying to be friends with both her and the countess. Isabella enters, and Doralice greets her as an old woman, which Isabella cannot stand.

=== Act 2 ===
Giacinto again complains to Doralice, who does not listen and sends for Colombina, asking pardon for the slap and doubling Colombina's salary out of her own pocket. Colombina tells her everything that Isabella said about her, once again exaggerating things. Doralice has her repeat everything to the knight, trying to bring him to her side. The knight goes along with her, as the doctor had done with Isabella, saying that she is right about everything and confirming that she is more important than the countess. Then, however, the knight realizes that it is Colombina who has spread these ill rumors, and plans to set her up.

Brighella again manages to fool Anselmo, who is intent on admiring an ancient Greek manuscript, by selling him fake antiques. Pantalone returns to Anselmo's house and tells him the manuscript is a fake, but Anselmo does not believe him. Pantalone also admonishes him to be careful with his money and to pay more attention to keeping his house in order; the count responds that it is better not to get involved in arguments, but agrees to a family meeting that Pantalone is organizing. Pantalone then encounters Arlecchino, still in disguise, who wants to sell more antiques to Anselmo, unmasks him and makes him confess the trick that he and Brighella played at the count's expense.

Isabella complains of her daughter-in-law to the doctor, and has Colombina tell her what the knight and Doralice said. Colombina again exaggerates. Then the countess goes to the family meeting, accompanied by the doctor. The count, prompted by Pantalone, asks her with unusual firmness to behave better towards Doralice, and she agrees. Doralice enters the room, but Anselmo gets distracted by the cameo design on her watch, believing it an antique, and entrusts the role of judge to Pantalone. Pantalone, however, cannot make the daughter-in-law and mother-in-law be quiet. Anselmo leaves to go to Brighella's; Isabella and Doralice fight, assisted by their respective "gentlemen," the doctor and the knight, and the meeting fails spectacularly.

=== Act 3 ===
Anselmo has bought a bunch of knick-knacks from Brighella, but Pantalone brings in Pancrazio, the most famous antiquarian in Palermo, who tells him that all his antiques are junk. The count does not want to believe him, and claims that he is just envious. Pantalone, however, brings Arlecchino into the room, and the latter confesses everything. The count is convinced, and decides to try to settle the tempers in the household.

The knight and the doctor decide to try to make peace between Doralice and Isabella. They listen to both of them, and settle an agreement in money between the two. Then Anselmo and Pantalone also come in to speak with their wife and daughter respectively, while the knight and doctor discover that Colombina has exaggerated the reports of the daughter-in-law and mother-in-law in order to stir up the argument. The whole family finds out, Colombina runs away, and Doralice and Isabella agree to make peace. However, in spite of intense mediation on the part of the rest of the family, they cannot agree on who must visit whom to make peace, because neither wants to get up and leave the room. The count and Giacinto give up and leave, while Pantalone argues with the doctor and the knight.

Pantalone then goes to speak to Anselmo and Giacinto, lamenting that his daughter was once less impertinent. He accepts the task of administering the household finances, to the great relief of Giacinto, who has been worried about them. However, he wants the permission to be signed in the presence of witnesses. They return to the countess's room, where she is complaining to the doctor about her daughter-in-law. Doralice enters as well, and Pantalone begins to read the various points of the contract: he will administer the finances and see to peace in the family; the knight and the doctor must leave the house, because their support encourages Doralice and Isabella to argue. (The knight accepts graciously, and the doctor only after protesting — the countess's disagreeable personality is what eventually persuades him.) Then it is decided that the daughter-in-law and the mother-in-law will live in two separate apartments, and Colombina will be thrown out. At the end, however, the two do not want to kiss and make up. Pantalone concludes that there is nothing to be done, but thinks that once those who fomented disagreement are removed, and once Doralice and Isabella are kept apart for a time, he will have succeeded at making the daughter-in-law and mother-in-law live together in peace.
