= Le donne vendicate =

Musical farce that consists of two intermezzi

- Intermezzi by Niccolò Piccinni
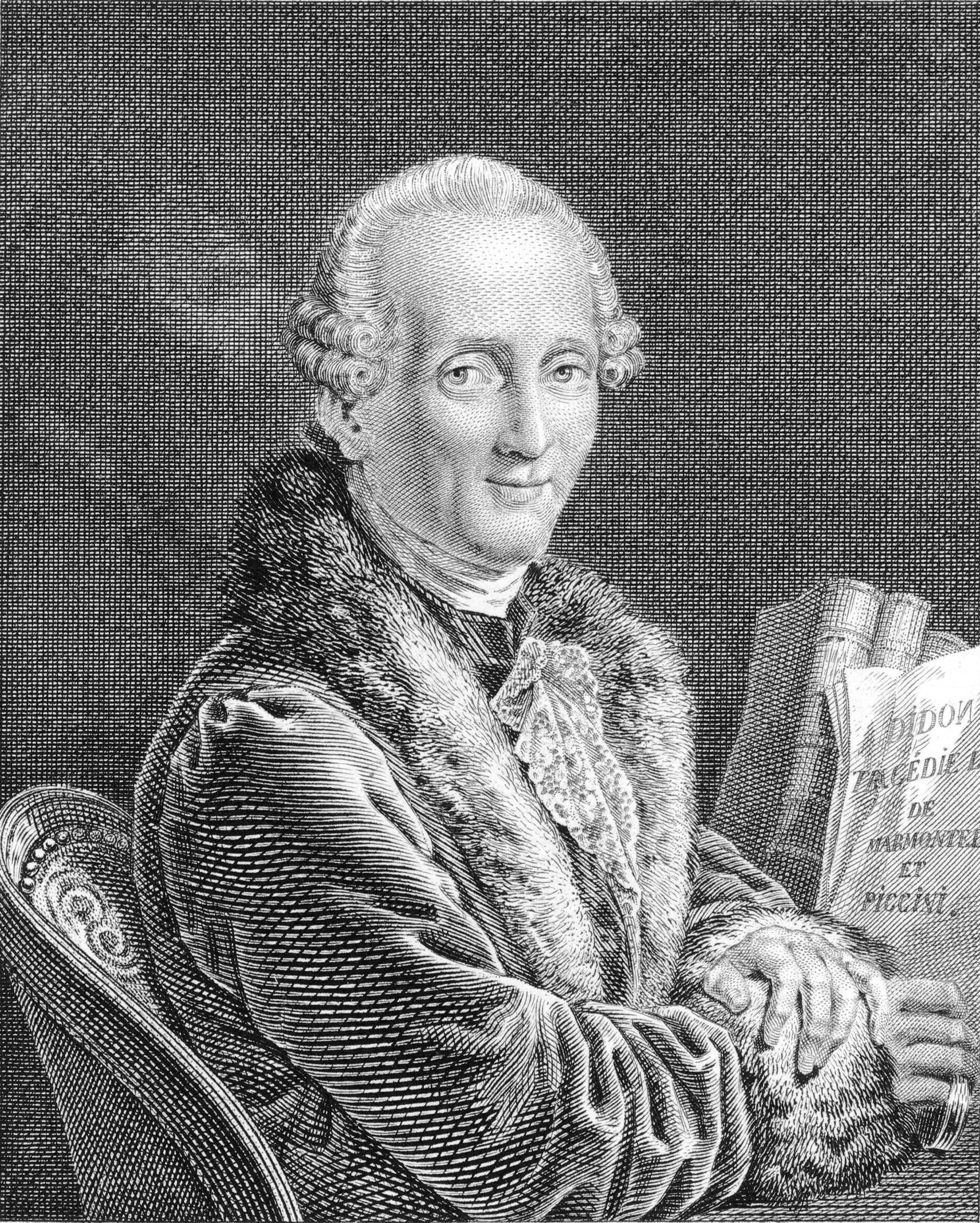
- Niccolò Piccinni, engraving by Hippolyte Pauquet
- Translation: The Revenge of the Women
- Librettist: Carlo Goldoni
- Language: Italian
- Premiere: 1763

Le donne vendicate (also titled The Revenge of the Women, Il vago disprezzato and Le fat méprisé) is a musical farce that consists of two intermezzi by composer Niccolò Piccinni with an Italian libretto by Carlo Goldoni. Goldoni's text had already been used twice previously, in operas by Gioacchino Cocchi (1751) and Giuseppe Scolari (1757). Piccinni's version was first performed at the Teatro alla Valle in Rome in 1763.

== Historical background ==
Le donne vendicate was commissioned by Cecilia Mahony Giustiniani, Princess of Bassano Romano, to be performed for Carnival in 1763. The publisher of the original score, Agostino Palombini, dedicated the printed libretto to her. The production was a critical success at its premiere with particular praise for the beautiful scenery painted by Sig. Giacomo Castellari, the elaborate costumes prepared by Giuseppe Griselli, the moving performances by the singers, and the beauty of the music. The opera ranks as one of the composer's more successful ventures, as witnessed by the large number of scores that survived in Austria, Germany, France, Poland, Italy and elsewhere. The exact date of the first performance is now unknown but it was sometime during Carnival in 1763. The two intermezzi tell one complete story and are meant to be performed together, between acts of an opera seria.

== Roles ==
Role	Voice type	Premiere cast, 1763 (Conductor: — )
Count Bellezza, an eccentric Knight	tenor	Giovanni Loattini (from Cesena)
Lindora, a simpering girl and niece of Ferramonte	soprano (castrato travesti)	Gaetano Farnassi (from Montorio)
Ferramonte, the ladies' champion	baritone	Francesco Battisti (from Rome)
Aurelia, novel-reading friend of Lindora's	soprano (castrato travesti)	Giuseppe Marrocchini (from Arpino)

== Recordings ==
- Le donne vendicate with conductor Diego Fasolis and I Barocchisti. Cast includes: Vincenzo Di Donato as Count Bellezza, Giuliana Castellani as Lindora, Mauro Buda as Ferramonte, and Sylva Pozzer as Aurelia. Released on the Chandos label in 2004.
