= Consoli =

Consoli is a surname. Notable people with the surname include:

- Carmen Consoli (born 1974), Italian singer-songwriter
- Federico Consoli (born 1998), Italian rugby union player
- Massimo Consoli (1945–2007), Italian gay rights activist
- Robert Consoli (1964–2005), American actor and musician
- Rachael Consoli (born 1971), American physician/surgeon. Medical missionary in Sudan, China, Alaska, among other places. Dr. Consoli wrote of her experience being kidnapped while volunteering as an OB/GYN surgeon in Sudan.
