= Timothy Holme =

Timothy Holme (1928–1987) was an English born, but latterly Italian resident, author. He is best known for his biography of Carlo Goldoni, the Venetian playwright and librettist, and for his series of five mystery novels featuring the fictional Neapolitan detective Achille Peroni.

Holme's parents were the producer and curator Stanford Holme and actress and author Thea Holme. His maternal grandfather was the architect Philip Mainwaring Johnston.

He began his working life in the theatre, switching to journalism after seven years of acting. On holiday in Italy, he met and married his Italian teacher, Bianca. They settled in Verona, where he wrote several non-fiction books (including the biography of Goldoni) and the five Peroni mysteries. He died in Italy in 1987.

== Works ==
Non-fiction

- A Servant of Many Masters: The Life and Times of Carlo Goldoni (1976)
- Vile Florentines: The Florence of Dante, Giotto and Boccaccio (1980)

Novels

- The Neapolitan Streak (1980)
- A Funeral of Gondolas (1981)
- The Devil and the Dolce Vita (1982)
- The Assisi Murders (1985)
- At the Lake of Sudden Death (1987)

Stage Plays

- "The Door"
- "Tall Story"
