= Lo speziale =

Opera by Joseph Haydn

- Opera buffa by Joseph Haydn
- Portrait of Haydn by Thomas Hardy, in 1791
- Translation: The Apothecary
- Librettist: Carlo Goldoni
- Language: Italian
- Premiere: 1768; Eszterháza

Lo speziale (The Apothecary), Hob. 28/3, is a three-act opera buffa by Joseph Haydn, with a libretto by Carlo Goldoni.

A love triangle between the poor apprentice Mengone, the rich and assured dandy Volpino, and the local apothecary's ward, Grilletta, Lo speziale is a comedy of great warmth and ebullience.

Lo speziale prefigures Mozart. It opens with an aria complaining about an apprentice apothecary's job, much like Leporello's opening aria in Don Giovanni. The trouser role of Volpino reminds one of Cherubino in Le nozze di Figaro and the young lovers' use of disguises will call Così fan tutte to mind.

The opera is scored for two flutes, two oboes, bassoon, two horns, strings, continuo.

== Performance history ==
It was composed and first performed to popular and critical acclaim at Eszterháza in the autumn of 1768. It was performed twice more during Haydn's lifetime, on 21 and 22 March 1770.

The opera has probably been performed more than all of Haydn's other operas put together. A German edition (as Der Apotheker) was published in 1895.

== Roles ==
Roles, voice types, premiere cast
Role	Voice type	Premiere cast, 1768 Conductor: Joseph Haydn
Sempronio, an old apothecary	tenor	Carlo Friberth
Grilletta, Sempronio's ward	soprano	Maddalena Spangler
Mengone, Sempronio's apprentice	tenor	Leopoldo Dichtler
Volpino, a young rich dandy	soprano (en travesti)	Barbara Dichtler

== Synopsis ==
An old man, Sempronio, is determined to marry a young woman, Grilletta, more for her money than for any other reason. Sempronio however has two rivals: his apprentice, Mengone, who has taken the job only to be near Grilletta, and Volpino, a young man about town.

Mengone has entered the service of the apothecary Sempronio, though he does not possess the slightest knowledge of chemistry. His love for Sempronio's ward Grilletta is the reason, and in the first scene he mixes drugs while making melancholy reflections on his lot, which has led him to a master who buries himself in his newspapers instead of attending to his business, and allowing his apprentices get on as best they may.

Sempronio relates that the plague is raging in Russia. The news that an old cousin of his has married his young ward is more interesting to him than all his drugs and pills; he intends to act likewise with Grilletta. This young lady has three suitors, one of whom, a rich young coxcomb, enters to order a drug. His real intention is to see Grilletta. He notices that Mengone loves her too, so he sends him out, in order to have Grilletta to himself. But she only mocks him, and on Mengone's return Volpino is forced to retire. Alone with Mengone, Grilletta encourages her timid lover, whom she likes, but just when he is about to take her hand Sempronio returns, furious to see them so intimate. He sends Mengone away to work and the young girl to her account books, while he buries himself once more in the papers.

Missing a map, he is obliged to leave the room: the young people take advantage of the situation, and when Sempronio, having lost his spectacles, goes to fetch them, Mengone grows bolder and kisses Grilletta. The old man returns at the supreme moment, and in a rage sends each to their room.

Mengone's effrontery emboldens Sempronio to marry Grilletta at once. He is however detained by Volpino, who comes to bribe him by an offer from the Sultan to go to Turkey as apothecary at court, war having broken out in that country. The wily young man insinuates that Sempronio will soon grow rich, and offers to give him 10,000 ducats at once, if he will give him Grilletta for his wife. Sempronio is quite willing to accept the Sultan's proposal, but not to cede Grilletta. So he sends Mengone away to fetch a notary, who is to marry him to his ward without delay. The maiden wracks her brains on how to rouse her timid lover to action.

Sempronio, hearing her sing sadly, suggests that she wants a husband and offers her his own worthy person. Grilletta accepts him, hoping to awaken Mengone's jealousy and rouse him to action. The notary comes, in whom Grilletta at once recognizes Volpino in disguise. He has hardly sat down, when a second notary enters, saying that he has been sent by Mengone and claiming his due. The latter is Mengone himself, and Sempronio, not recognizing the two, bids them sit down. He dictates the marriage contract, in which Grilletta is said to marry Sempronio by her own free will; the two false notaries distort every word of old Sempronio's, and each puts his own name instead of the guardian's. When the contract is written, Sempronio takes one copy, Grilletta the other and the whole fraud is discovered. Volpino vanishes, but Mengone promises Grilletta to do his best in order to win her.

In the last scene Sempronio receives a letter from Volpino, telling him that the Pasha is to come with a suite of Turks to buy all his medicines at a high price, and to appoint him solemnly as the Sultan's apothecary. Volpino indeed arrives, with his attendants, all disguised as Turks, but he is again recognized by Grilletta. He offers his gold, and seizes Grilletta's hand, to carry her off, but Sempronio interferes. Then the Turks begin to destroy all the pots and glasses and costly medicines, and when Sempronio objects, the false Pasha draws his dagger, but Mengone intervenes and induces the frightened old man to promise Grilletta to him, if he succeeds in saving him from the Turks. No sooner is the promise written and signed, than Grilletta tears off the Pasha's false beard and reveals Volpino, who retires baffled, while the false Turks drink the young couple's health at the cost of the two defeated suitors.

== Recordings ==
- 1978 – Attila Fülöp, István Rozsos, Magda Kalmár, Veronika Kincses – Franz Liszt Chamber Orchestra, György Lehel (Hungaroton)

== Sources ==
- Synopsis adapted from: Annesley, Charles. The Standard Opera Glass – Containing the Detailed Plots of One Hundred and Thirty Celebrated Operas, Sampson Low, Marston, London, Lemcke & Buechner, New York, 1901.
