= Le bourru bienfaisant =

French prose comedy in three acts by Carlo Goldoni

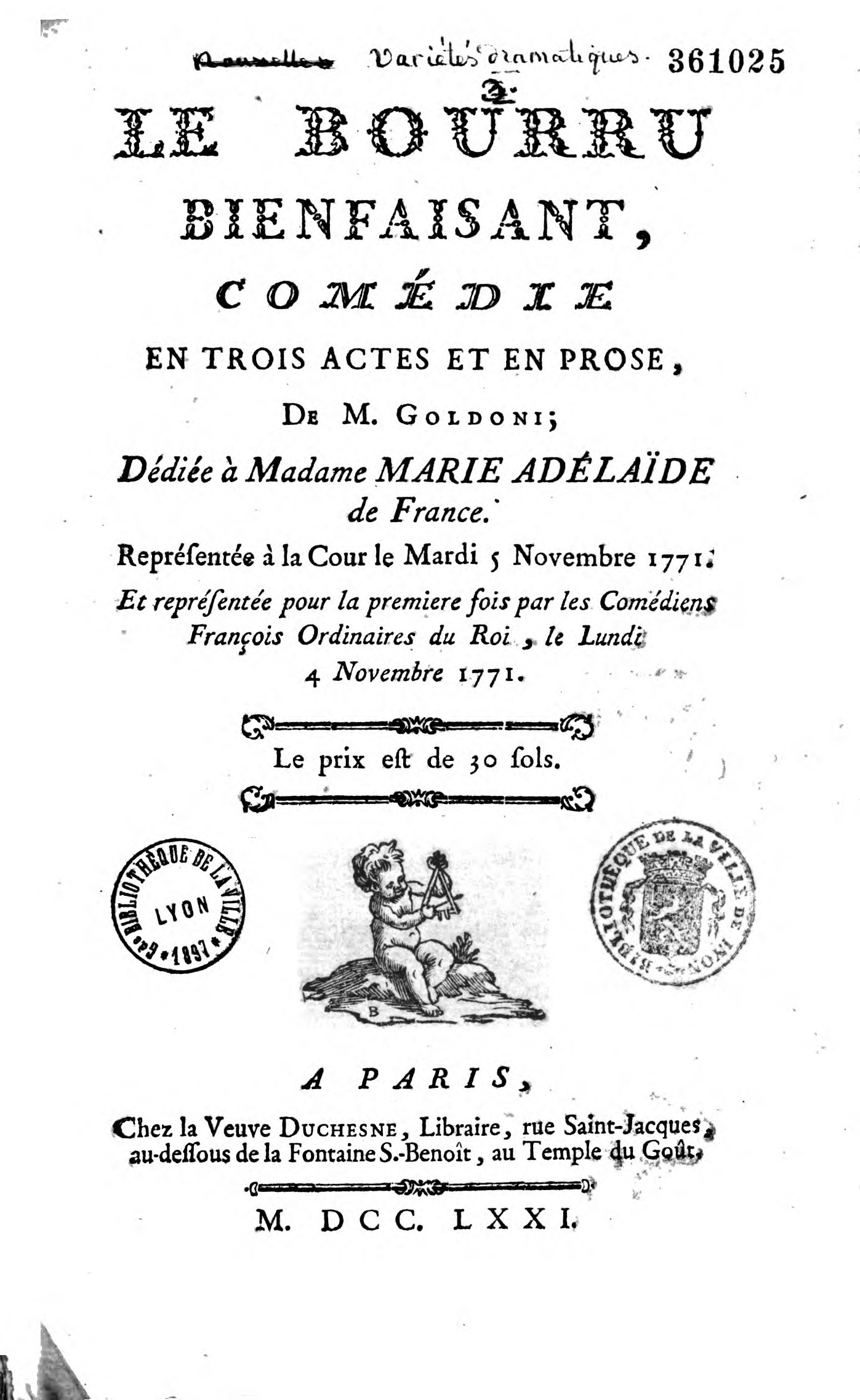
Title page (1771)

Le bourru bienfaisant (The Beneficent Bear, Italian: Il burbero benefico) is a French prose comedy in three acts by Venetian playwright Carlo Goldoni. In 1765 Goldoni became the Italian tutor of a daughter of Louis XV, Marie Adélaïde, who in 1769 was able to arrange for him an annual pension of 4,000 livres. He dedicated the play to her. It was premiered on 4 February 1771 by the Comédie-Française at the Théâtre des Tuileries in Paris and at court on 5 February. The play was highly successful and was published in 1771.

== Roles ==
Role	Premiere cast, 4 February 1771
M. Géronte	M. Préville
M. Dalancour, nephew of M. Géronte	M. Molé
Dorval, friend of M. Géronte	M. Bellecour
Valère, in love with Angélique	M. Monvel
Picard, lackey of M. Géronte	M. Feulie
Mde. Dalancour	Mde. Préville
Angélique, sister of M. Dalancour	Mlle. Doligny
Marton, governess of M. Géronte	Mde. Bellecour

== Synopsis ==
The scene is set in the drawing room of MM. Géronte and Dalancour. There are three doors: one opens into the apartment of M. Géronte, the other, on the opposite side, into that of M. Dalancour; and the third, in the back, serves as the entrance and exit to all the world. There are some couches, some armchairs, and a table with a chessboard.

The action shows the curmudgeonly Géronte's victory over his own customarily disagreeable self. Valère is in love with Angélique, Géronte's niece. They discover that Angélique's brother Dalancour has misspent the family's money and intends to send her to a convent. She tells Géronte, but he is so gruff, she does not reveal her love for Valère. Géronte decides to arrange for her an advantageous marriage to his elderly friend Dorval, who agrees, but only if Angélique consents. Dalancour learns he will be arrested for his debts, but Valère offers to give Dalancour the money and to marry Angélique without a dowry. In the meantime, Dalancour's wife asks Géronte to save her husband by paying his debts, and Géronte hesitantly agrees. Dorval arrives with the two lovers and enlightens Géronte, who blesses the couple, bestows an ample dowry, and asks everyone to dinner.

== Bibliography ==
- Bondanella, Peter (1984). "Goldoni, Carlo", vol. 2, pp. 344–357, in McGraw-Hill Encyclopedia of World Drama, second edition in five volumes, edited by Stanley Hochman. New York: McGraw-Hill. ISBN 9780070791695.
- Guidotti, Angela (2007). "Carlo Goldoni (1707–1793)", vol. 1, pp. 865–870, in Encyclopedia of Italian Literary Studies, two volumes, edited by Gaetana Maronne. New York/London: Routledge. ISBN 9781579583903.
- Richards, Kenneth (1995). "Goldoni, Carlo", pp. 432–434, in The Cambridge Guide to Theatre, second edition, edited by Martin Banham. Cambridge University Press. ISBN 9780521434379.
- Wild, Nicole (1989). Dictionnaire des théâtres parisiens au XIXe siècle: les théâtres et la musique. Paris: Aux Amateurs de livres. ISBN 9780828825863. ISBN 9782905053800 (paperback). View formats and editions at WorldCat.
