= I pettegolezzi delle donne =

Comedy play by Carlo Goldoni

I pettegolezzi delle donne is a comedy play by Venetian playwright Carlo Goldoni. It was published in 1750. It was written about two Italian women sitting at a fountain and gossiping. Columbina, a maid, and Isobella, Pantalone's daughter, are the two women. Pierrot, Columbina's husband, hears them gossiping and much hilarity ensues.
