= Il teatro comico =

Comedy play by Carlo Goldoni

Il teatro comico is a comedy play by Venetian playwright Carlo Goldoni. It was written in 1750.

The first of sixteen comedies, commissioned by Gerolamo Medebach early in 1750, the play represents an innovation in Goldoni's production. In the Introduction, the author discusses the current state of the comedy, corrupted and often vulgar, and presents his project to put in new honour the good practices of the tradition, while showing scenes and characters true to real life.
Il teatro comico is a metatheatrical comedy, which foregrounds the play's status as staged. The characters are actors, that in order to play a comedy, put on masks and names of the traditional Commedia dell'Arte.
