= Il vero amico =

Play by Carlo Goldoni

Il vero amico ("The True Friend") is a play by Carlo Goldoni written in 1750. It has been translated into English under the title The True Friend by Anna Cuffaro. The play is a comedy about two friends who are in love with the same woman.

In Memoirs (Carlo Goldoni's autobiography), Goldoni states: "This comedy is one of my favourites and I had the greatest pleasure in seeing that the audience confirmed my view" .
