= Carlo Goldoni =

Italian playwright (1707–1793)

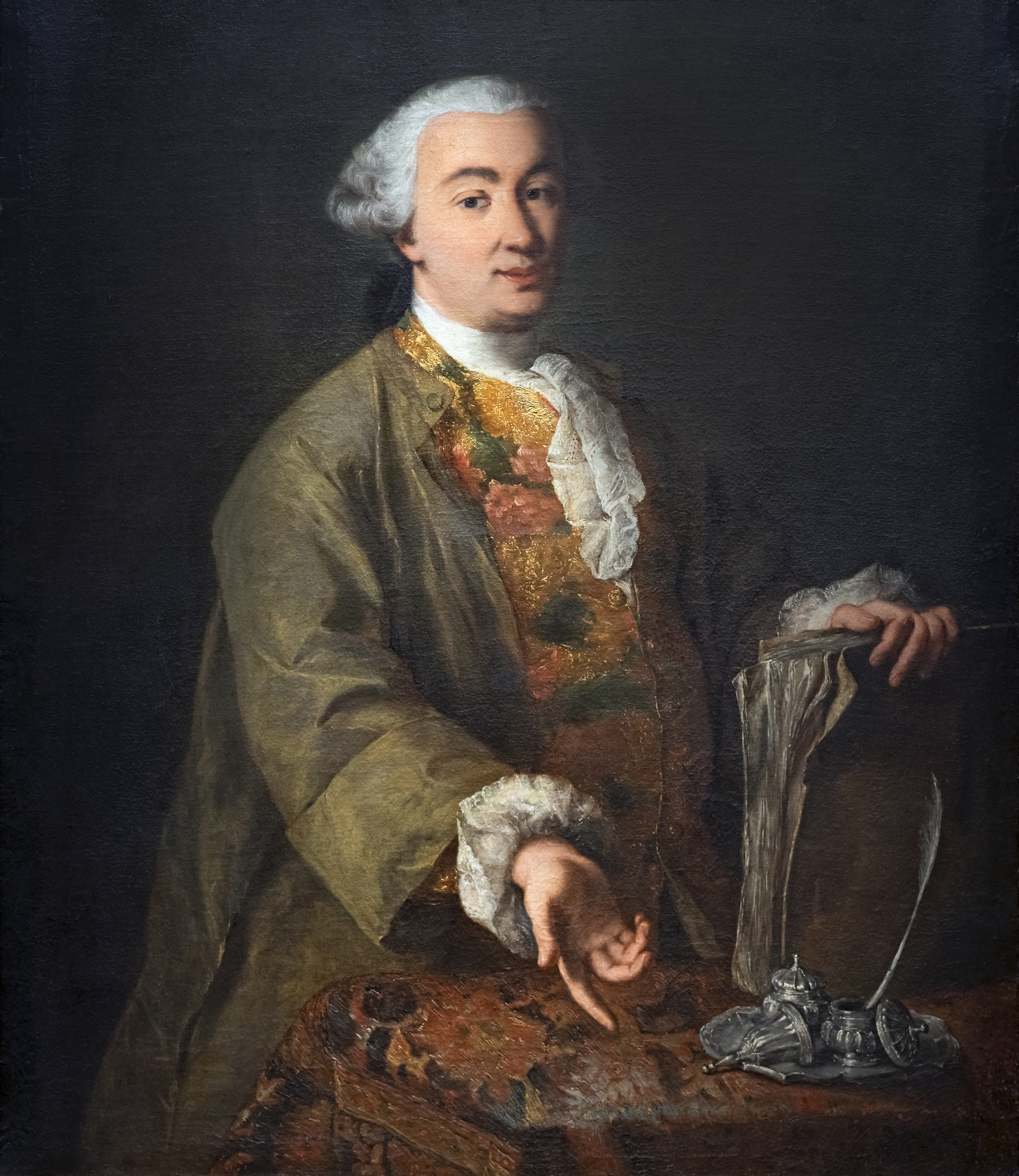
- Portrait of Carlo Goldoni by Alessandro Longhi, c. 1757, Venice, Ca' Goldoni
- Born: Carlo Osvaldo Goldoni; 25 February 1707; Venice, Republic of Venice (present-day Italy)
- Died: 6 February 1793 (aged 85); Paris, France
- Education: University of Modena
- Occupations: Playwright; librettist; lawyer
- Spouse: Nicoletta Conio
- Writing career
- Pen name: Polisseno Fegeio, Pastor Arcade
- Language: Venetian; Italian; French
- Period: from 1725
- Genres: Comedy; tragicomedy; tragedy; libretto; poetry; memoirs
- Subjects: Humanity, middle class
- Notable works: The Servant of Two Masters; The Mistress of the Inn
- Movement: Classicism

Carlo Osvaldo Goldoni (/ɡɒlˈdoʊni/, also US: /ɡɔːlˈ-, ɡoʊlˈ-/; Italian: [ˈkarlo oˈzvaldo ɡolˈdoːni]; 25 February 1707 – 6 February 1793) was an Italian playwright and librettist from the Republic of Venice. His works include some of Italy's most famous and best-loved plays. Audiences have admired the plays of Goldoni for their ingenious mix of wit and honesty. His plays offered his contemporaries images of themselves, often dramatizing the lives, values, and conflicts of the emerging middle classes. Though he wrote in French and Italian, his plays make rich use of the Venetian language, regional vernacular, and colloquialisms. Goldoni also wrote under the pen name and title Polisseno Fegeio, Pastor Arcade, which he claimed in his memoirs the "Arcadians of Rome" bestowed on him.

== Biography ==
=== Memoirs ===
There is an abundance of autobiographical information on Goldoni, most of which comes from the introductions to his plays and from his Memoirs. However, these memoirs are known to contain many errors of fact, especially about his earlier years.

In these memoirs, he portrays himself as a born comedian, careless, light-hearted and with a happy temperament, proof against all strokes of fate, yet thoroughly respectable and honourable.

=== Early life and studies ===
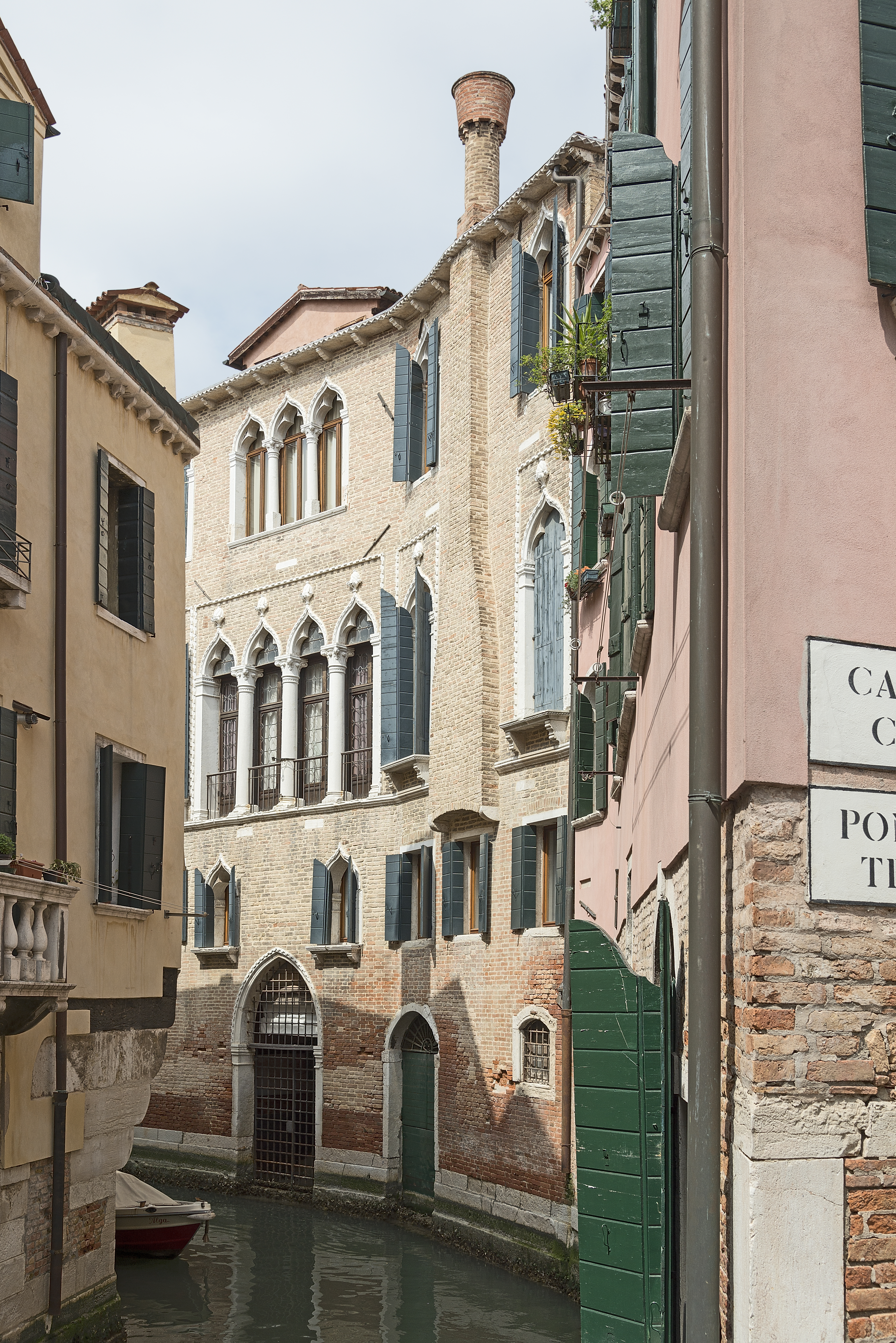
Palazzo Centani birthplace of Goldoni in Venice

Goldoni was born in Venice in 1707, the son of Margherita Salvioni (or Saioni) and Giulio Goldoni. In his memoirs, Goldoni describes his father as a physician, and claims that he was introduced to theatre by his grandfather Carlo Alessandro Goldoni. In reality, it seems that Giulio was an apothecary; as for the grandfather, he had died four years before Carlo's birth. In any case, Goldoni was deeply interested in theatre from his earliest years, and all attempts to direct his activity into other channels were of no avail; his toys were puppets, and his books were plays.

His father placed him under the care of the philosopher Caldini at Rimini but the youth soon ran away with a company of strolling players and returned to Venice. In 1723 his father matriculated him into the stern Collegio Ghislieri in Pavia, which imposed the tonsure and monastic habits on its students. However, he relates in his Memoirs that a considerable part of his time was spent reading Greek and Latin comedies. He had already begun writing at this time and, in his third year, he composed a libellous poem (Il colosso) in which he ridiculed the daughters of certain Pavian families. As a result of that incident (and/or of a visit with some schoolmates to a local brothel), he was expelled from the school and had to leave the city (1725). He studied law at Udine, and eventually took his degree at University of Modena. He was employed as a law clerk at Chioggia and Feltre, after which he returned to his native city and began practising.

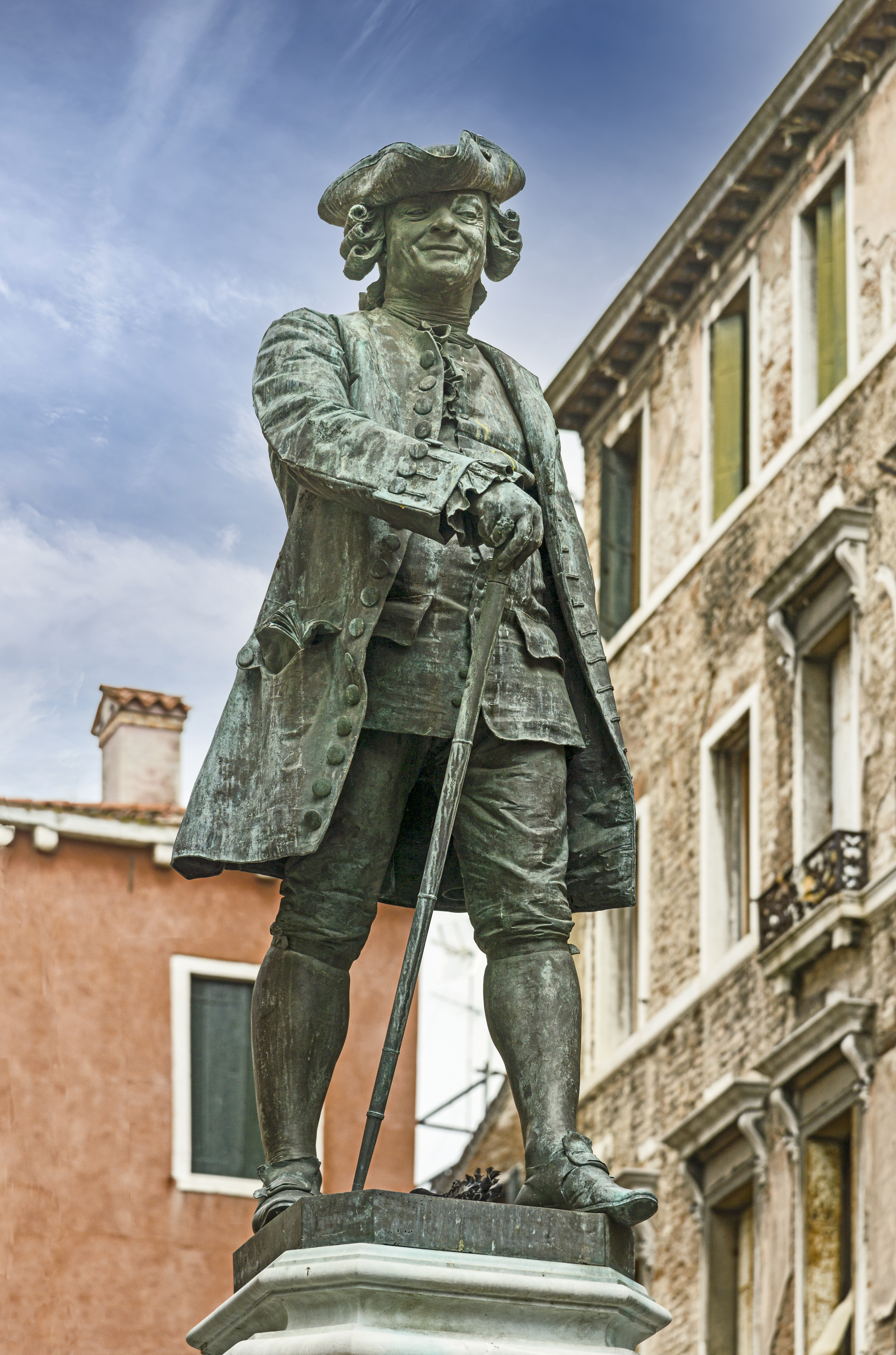
Monument to Goldoni in Venice (sculpted by Antonio Dal Zotto)

Educated as a lawyer, and holding lucrative positions as secretary and counsellor, he seemed, indeed, at one time to have settled down to the practice of law, but following an unexpected summons to Venice, after an absence of several years, he changed his career, and thenceforth he devoted himself to writing plays and managing theatres. His father died in 1731. In 1732, to avoid an unwanted marriage, he left the town for Milan and then for Verona where the theatre manager Giuseppe Imer helped him on his way to becoming a comical poet as well as introducing him to his future wife, Nicoletta Conio. Goldoni returned with her to Venice, where he stayed until 1743.

=== Theatrical career ===
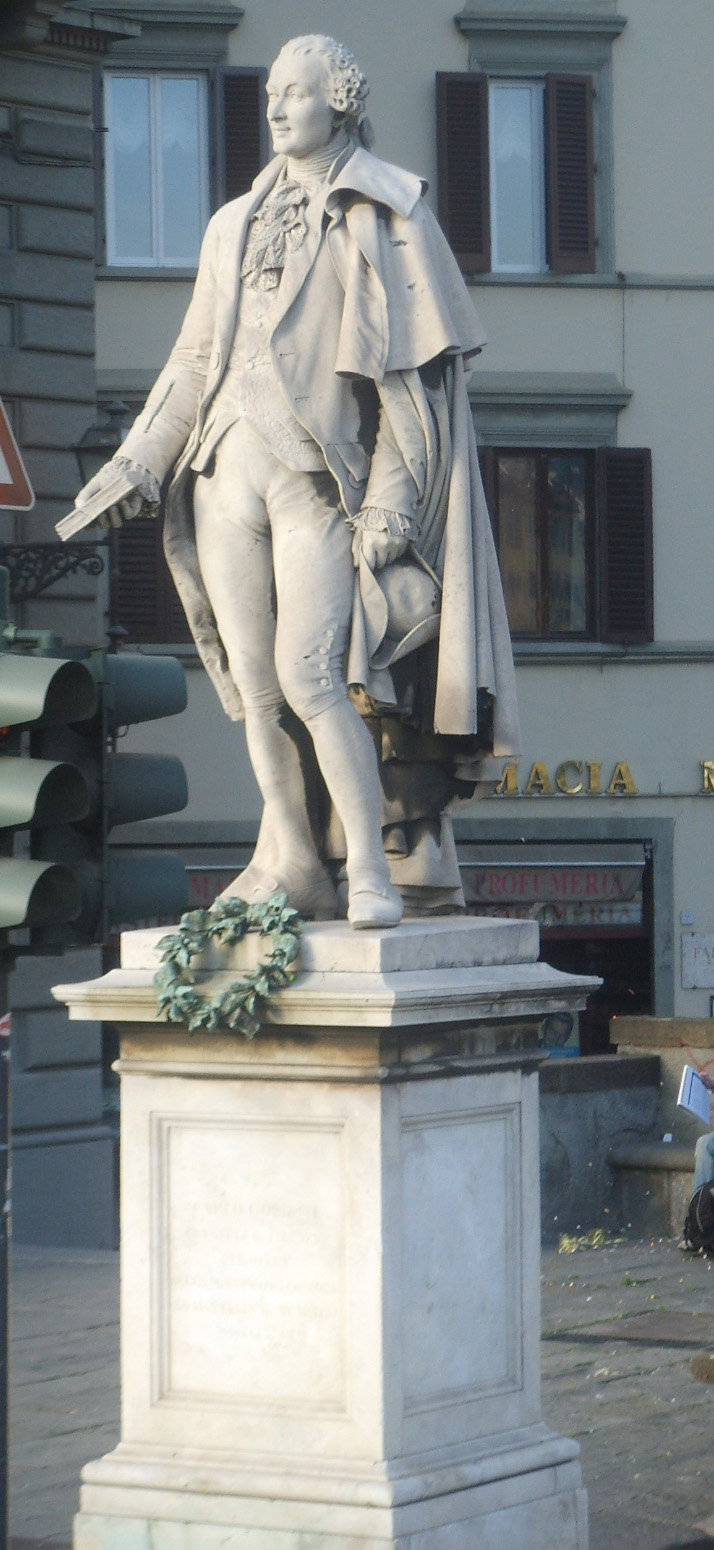
Monument to Goldoni in Florence (sculpted by Ulisse Cambi)

Goldoni entered the Italian theatre scene with a tragedy, Amalasunta, produced in Milan. The play was a critical and financial failure.

Submitting it to Count Prata, director of the opera, he was told that his piece "was composed with due regard for the rules of Aristotle and Horace, but not according to those laid down for the Italian drama." "In France", continued the count, "you can try to please the public, but here in Italy it is the actors and actresses whom you must consult, as well as the composer of the music and the stage decorators. Everything must be done according to a certain form which I will explain to you."

Goldoni thanked his critic, went back to his inn and ordered a fire, into which he threw the manuscript of his Amalasunta.

His next play, Belisario, written in 1734, was more successful, though of its success he afterwards professed himself ashamed.

During this period he also wrote librettos for opera seria and served for a time as literary director of the San Giovanni Grisostomo, Venice's most distinguished opera house.

He wrote other tragedies for a time, but he was not long in discovering that his bent was for comedy. He had come to realize that the Italian stage needed reforming; adopting Molière as his model, he went to work in earnest and in 1738 produced his first real comedy, L'uomo di mondo ("The Man of the World"). During his many wanderings and adventures in Italy, he was constantly at work and when, at Livorno, he became acquainted with the manager Medebac, he determined to pursue the profession of playwriting in order to make a living. He was employed by Medebac to write plays for his theatre in Venice. He worked for other managers and produced during his stay in that city some of his most characteristic works. He also wrote Momolo Cortesan in 1738. By 1743, he had perfected his hybrid style of playwriting (combining the model of Molière with the strengths of Commedia dell'arte and his own wit and sincerity). This style was typified in La Donna di garbo, the first Italian comedy of its kind.

After 1748, Goldoni collaborated with the composer Baldassare Galuppi, making significant contributions to the new form of 'opera buffa'. Galuppi composed the score for more than twenty of Goldoni's librettos. As with his comedies, Goldoni's opera buffa integrates elements of the Commedia dell'arte with recognisable local and middle-class realities. His operatic works include two of the most successful musical comedies of the eighteenth century, Il filosofo di campagna (The Country Philosopher), set by Galuppi (1752) and La buona figliuola (The Good Girl), set by Niccolò Piccinni (1760).

In 1753, following his return from Bologna, he defected to the Teatro San Luca of the Vendramin family, where he performed most of his plays to 1762.

=== Move to France and death ===
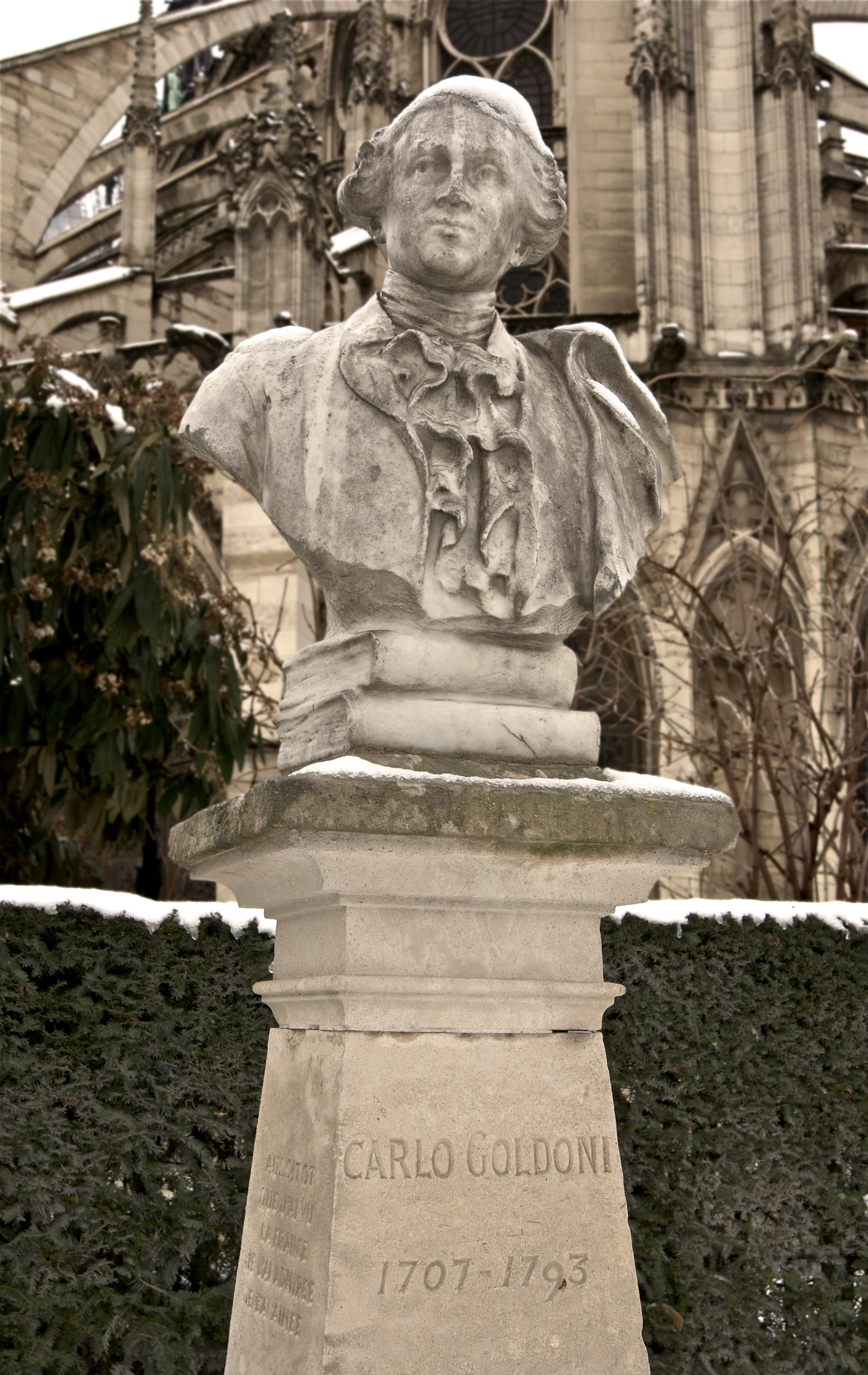
Bust of Goldoni, near Notre Dame in Paris

In 1757, he engaged in a bitter dispute with playwright Carlo Gozzi, which left him utterly disgusted with the tastes of his countrymen; so much so that in 1761 he moved to Paris, where he received a position at court and was put in charge of the Théâtre-Italien. He spent the rest of his life in France, composing most of his plays in French and writing his memoirs in that language.

Among the plays which he wrote in French, the most successful was Le bourru bienfaisant, dedicated to Marie Adélaïde, a daughter of Louis XV and aunt to the dauphin, the future Louis XVI of France. It premiered on 4 February 1771, almost nine months after the dauphin's marriage to Marie Antoinette. Goldoni enjoyed considerable popularity in France; in 1769, when he retired to Versailles, the King gave him a pension. He lost this pension after the French Revolution. The Convention eventually voted to restore his pension the day after his death. It was restored to his widow, at the pleading of the poet André Chénier; "She is old", he urged, "she is seventy-six, and her husband has left her no heritage save his illustrious name, his virtues and his poverty."

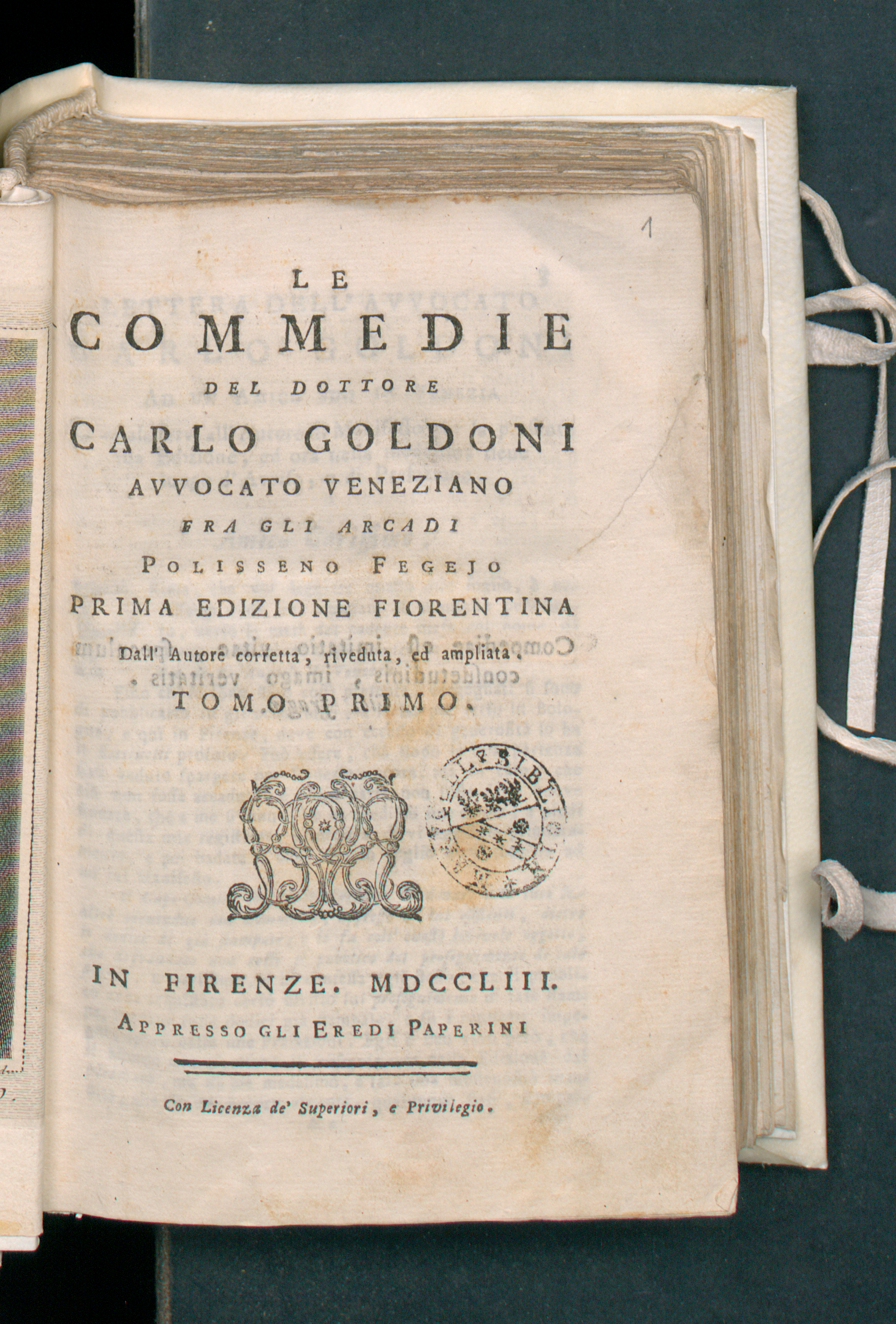
Commedie del dottore Carlo Goldoni (1753)

== Goldoni's impact on Italian theatre ==
In his Memoirs Goldoni amply discusses the state of Italian comedy when he began writing. At that time, Italian comedy revolved around the conventionality of the Commedia dell'arte, or improvised comedy. Goldoni took to himself the task of superseding the comedy of masks and the comedy of intrigue with representations of actual life and manners through the characters and their behaviours. He maintained that Italian life and manners were susceptible of artistic treatment such as had not been given them before.

His works are a lasting monument to the changes that he initiated: a dramatic revolution that had been attempted but not achieved before. Goldoni's importance lies in providing good examples rather than precepts. Goldoni says that he took for his models the plays of Molière and that whenever a piece of his own succeeded he whispered to himself: "Good, but not yet Molière". Goldoni's plays are gentler and more optimistic in tone than Molière's.

It was this very success that was the object of harsh critiques by Carlo Gozzi, who accused Goldoni of having deprived the Italian theatre of the charms of poetry and imagination. The great success of Gozzi's fairy dramas so irritated Goldoni that it led to his self-exile to France.

Goldoni gave to his country a classical form, which, though it has since been cultivated, has yet to be cultivated by a master.

== Themes ==
Goldoni's plays that were written while he was still in Italy ignore religious and ecclesiastical subjects. This may be surprising, considering his staunch Catholic upbringing. No thoughts are expressed about death or repentance in his memoirs or in his comedies. After his move to France, his position became clearer, as his plays took on a clear anti-clerical tone and often satirized the hypocrisy of monks and of the Church.

Goldoni was inspired by his love of humanity and the admiration he had for his fellow men. He wrote, and was obsessed with, the relationships that humans establish with one another, their cities and homes, and the study of philosophy. The moral and civil values that Goldoni promotes in his plays are those of rationality, civility, humanism, the importance of the rising middle class, a progressive stance on state affairs, honour and honesty. Goldoni had a dislike for arrogance, intolerance and the abuse of power.

Goldoni's main characters are no abstract examples of human virtue, nor monstrous examples of human vice. They occupy the middle ground of human temperament. Goldoni maintains an acute sensibility for the differences in social classes between his characters as well as environmental and generational changes. Goldoni pokes fun at the arrogant nobility and the pauper who lacks dignity.

== Venetian and Tuscan ==
As in other theatrical works of the time and place, the characters in Goldoni's Italian comedies spoke originally either the literary Tuscan variety (which became modern Italian) or the Venetian dialect, depending on their station in life. However, in some printed editions of his plays, he often turned the Venetian texts into Tuscan, too.

== Goldoni in popular culture ==
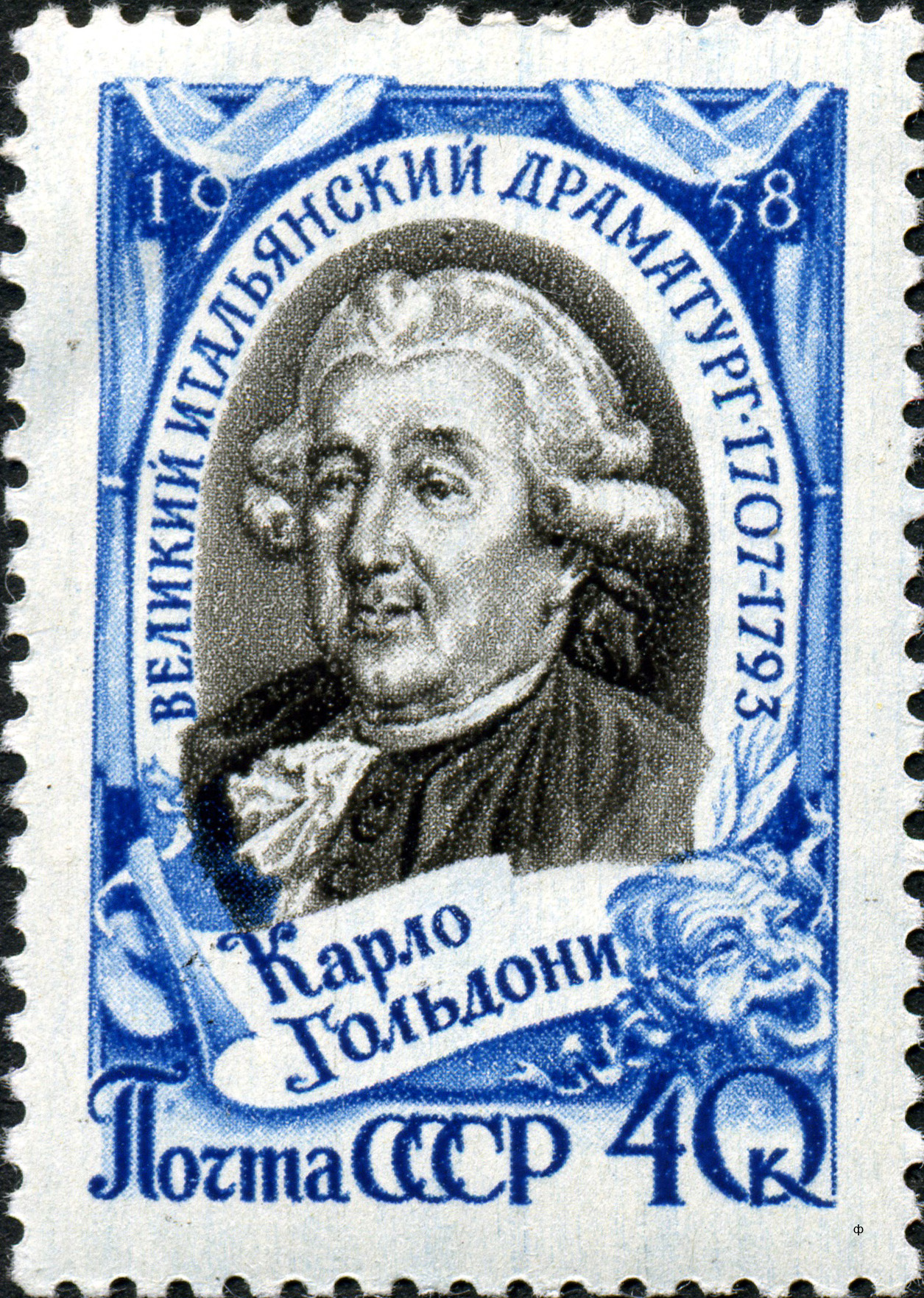
Goldoni on a Soviet stamp, 1958

One of his best-known works is the comic play The Servant of Two Masters, which has been translated and adapted internationally numerous times. In 1966 it was adapted into an opera buffa by the American composer Vittorio Giannini. In 2011, Richard Bean adapted the play for the National Theatre of Great Britain as One Man, Two Guvnors. Its popularity led to a transfer to the West End and in 2012 to Broadway.

The film Carlo Goldoni – Venice, Grand Theatre of the World, directed by Alessandro Bettero, was released in 2007 and is available in English, Italian, French, and Japanese.

== Selected works ==
The following is a small sampling of Goldoni's enormous output.

=== Tragedies ===
- Rosmonda (1734)
- Griselda (1734)

=== Tragicomedies ===
- Belisario (1734)
- Don Giovanni Tenorio o sia Il dissoluto, "The Dissolute" (1735)
- Rinaldo di Montalbano (1736)

=== Comedies ===
- Il servitore di due padroni, (1745) "The Servant of Two Masters" (now often retitled Arlecchino servitore di due padroni "Harlequin Servant of Two Masters")
- I due gemelli veneziani, "The Two Venetian Twins" (1747)
- La vedova scaltra, "The Shrewd Widow" (1748) (Note: La vedova scaltra was used for operas by Marcello Bernardini (as La donna di spirito) in 1770, Vincenzo Righini in 1774, Niccolò Piccinni in 1773, Pasquale Anfossi in 1780, and Ermanno Wolf-Ferrari in 1931 (see La vedova scaltra).)
- La putta onorata, "The Honorable Maid" (1749)
- Il cavaliere e la dama, "The Gentleman and the Lady" (1749)
- La famiglia dell'antiquario, "The Antiquarian's Family" (1750)
- Il teatro comico, "The Comical Theatre" (1750–1751)
- Il bugiardo, "The Liar" (1750–1751)
- Il vero amico, "The True Friend" (1750) translated by Anna Cuffaro
- I pettegolezzi delle donne, "Women's Gossip" (1750–1751)
- La locandiera, "The Mistress of the Inn" (1751)
- Il feudatario "The Feudal Lord" (1752)
- Gl'innamorati, "The Lovers" (1759)
- I rusteghi, "The Boors" (1760)
- Le baruffe chiozzotte, "The Chioggia Scuffles" (1762)
- Gli amori di Zelinda e Lindoro, "The Love of Zelinda and Lindoro" (1764)

=== Opera seria libretti ===
- Amalasunta (1732)
- Gustavo primo, re di Svezia (c. 1738)
- Oronte, re de' Sciti (1740)
- Statira (c. 1740)

=== Opera buffa libretti ===
- La contessina (The Young Countess) by Maccari (1743)
- L'Arcadia in Brenta (The Arcadia in Brenta) by Galuppi (1749)
- Il mondo della luna (The World on the Moon), set to music by Galuppi (1750), Haydn (1777), Paisiello (1782) and other composers.
- Il filosofo di campagna (The Country Philosopher) by Galuppi (1754)
- Il mercato di Malmantile (The Malmantile Market) by Fischietti (1757)
- Buovo d'Antona, set to music by Tommaso Traetta (1758, incorrectly recorded as 1750 in Zatta's edition)
- La buona figliuola (The Good Girl) by Niccolò Piccinni (1760)
- Lo speziale (The Apothecary) by Joseph Haydn (1768)
- La finta semplice (The Fake Innocent) by Wolfgang Amadeus Mozart (1769)
- Le pescatrici (The Fisherwomen) by Haydn (1770), Florian Leopold Gassmann (1771)

=== Intermezzo libretti ===
- Le donne vendicate, "The Revenge of the Women" (1751)

=== Cantatas and serenades ===
- La ninfa saggia, "The Wise Nymph" (17??)
- Gli amanti felici, "The Happy Lovers" (17??)

=== Poetry ===
- Il colosso, a satire against Pavia girls which led to Goldoni being expelled from Collegio Ghislieri (1725)
- Il quaresimale in epilogo (1725–1726)

=== Books ===
- Nuovo teatro comico, "New Comic Theater", plays. Pitteri, Venice (1757)
- Mémoires, "Memoirs". Paris (1787)
- Goldoni's collected works. Zalta, Venice (1788–1795)

=== Selected translations of Goldoni's works ===
- Il vero amico, "The True Friend" translated by Anna Cuffaro. Publisher: Sparkling Books.
- Archifanfaro, translated by W. H. Auden with an introduction by Michael Andre in Unmuzzled OX.

== Sources ==
- Bates, Alfred, editor (1903). "Goldoni", vol. 5, pp. 63–69, in The Drama: Its History, Literature and Influence on Civilization. London/New York: Smart and Stanley.
- Holme, Timothy (1976). A Servant of Many Masters: The Life and Times of Carlo Goldoni. London: Jupiter. ISBN 0-904041-61-1.
- Richards, Kenneth (1995). "Goldoni, Carlo", pp. 432–434, in The Cambridge Guide to Theatre, second edition, edited by Martin Banham. Cambridge University Press. ISBN 9780521434379.
- Ritratti di Carlo Goldoni. Letteratura ed arte veneta (No. 4) (in Italian). Venice: Edizioni della Fortuna. 1957. p. 89. OCLC 860483793.
