= Jean-Albert =

Jean-Albert is a French masculine given name. Notable people with the name include:

== People ==
- Jean-Albert Brasu (1898–1979), French equestrian
- Jean-Albert Cartier (1930–2015), French art critic and director of cultural institutions
- Jean-Albert Dadas (1860–1907), French gas fitter and traveller
- Jean-Albert Dinkespiler (1927–2014), French engineer
- Jean-Albert Grégoire (1899–1992), French racing driver and automotive engineer

== See also ==
- A. Jean de Grandpré (1921–2022; first name Albert), Canadian businessman and lawyer
- Albert Auguste Perdonnet (1801–1867; born Jean Albert Vincent Auguste Perdonnet), French railroad engineer
- Albert Ayat (1875–1935; second name Jean), French fencer
- Albert Belin (1610–1677; middle name Albert), French bishop and writer
- Albert Frédéric Jean Galeer (1810–1851), Swiss-born teacher and man of letters
- Albert Gaspard Grimod (1772–1843; born Jean-François-Louis-Marie-Albert-Gaspard Grimod), French count and Bonapartist general and nobleman
- Albert Houssiau (born 1924; second name Jean), Belgian prelate of the Catholic Church
- Albert-Jean, pen name for Marie, Joseph, Albert, François Jean (1892–1975), French poet, novelist and playwright
- Albert Jean Amateau (1889–1996), Turkish-American rabbi, businessman, lawyer and social activist
- Albert Jean Baptiste Marie Vayssière (1854–1942), French scientist
- Albert Jean Michel de Rocca (1788–1818) French military officer
- Albert Lacroix (1834–1903; born Jean Baptiste Constant Marie Albert Lacroix), Belgian editor and printer
- Albert Lavignac (1846–1916; born Alexandre Jean Albert Lavignac), French music scholar and composer
- Albert Lilar (1900–1976; born Albert Jean Julien François), Belgian politician, lawyer and minister of justice
- Albert Rouet (born 1936; middle name Jean-Marie), French bishop
- Albert Terrien de Lacouperie (1844–1894; born Albert Étienne Jean-Baptiste Terrien de Lacouperie), French orientalist
- Charles-Marie Widor (1844–1937; born Charles-Marie-Jean-Albert Widor), French organist and composer
- Hervé Jonathan (born 1961; second and third names Jean Albert), French civil servant, and current Administrator Superior of Wallis and Futuna since 2021
- Jack Fournier (ice hockey) (1892–1966; born Albert Jean Fournier), Canadian ice hockey player
- Jean Albert d'Archambaud (c. 1650–1740), French priest
- Jean Albert Gaudry (1827–1908), French geologist and palaeontologist
- Jean Albert Sulpice (1912–1985), French curler
- Jean Bertho (1928–2023; born Jean René Albert Berthollier), French actor and film director
- Jean De Schryver (1916–1981; second name Jean), Belgian boxer
- Jean-Félix-Albert-Marie Vilnet (1922–2013), French prelate of the Roman Catholic Church
- Jean-François-Albert du Pouget (1818–1904), French anthropologist and palaeontologist
- Jean Gorin (1899–1981; born Albert Jean Gorin), French painter
- Jean Lussier (1891–1971; born Joseph Albert Lussier), Canadian-American daredevil
- Jean-Marie Bottequin (born 1941, middle name Albert), Belgian photographer and mime
- Jean-Marie Bourgeois (1939–2020; middle name Albert), French skier
- Jean-Max Albert (born 1942), French painter, sculptor, writer and musician
- Jean McEwen (1923–1999; middle name Albert), Canadian painter
- Joseph Jean-Baptiste Albert (1771–1822), French soldier
- Loïc Jean-Albert (born 1978), French-born Réunion parachutist and skydiver
- Schang Hutter (1934–2021; born Jean Albert Hutter), Swiss sculptor
- JA (disambiguation)
