= Ambléon =

Commune in Auvergne-Rhône-Alpes, France

- Commune
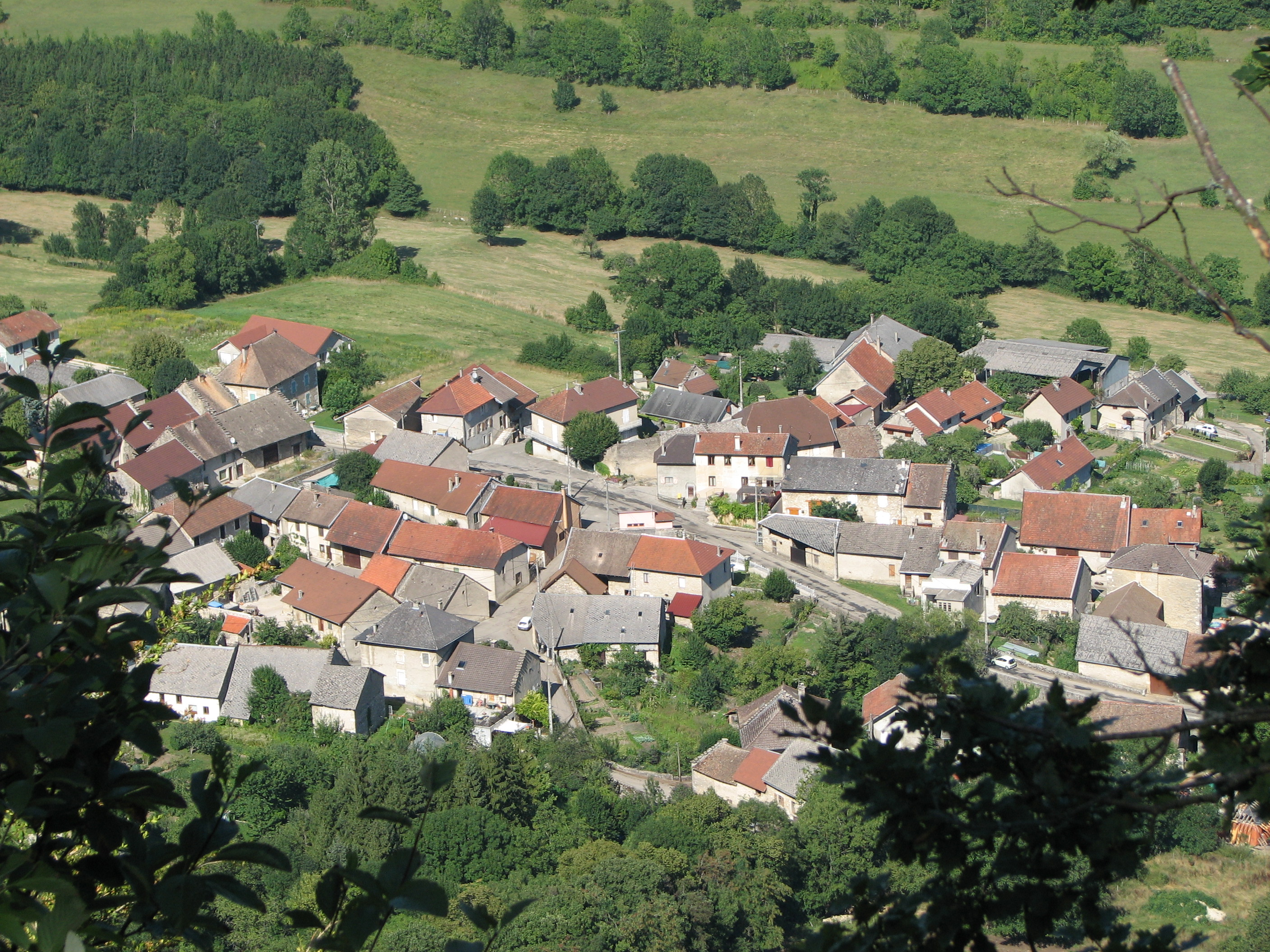
- Location of Ambléon
- Location within France Location within Auvergne-Rhône-Alpes
- Coordinates: 45°45′00″N 5°36′06″E
- Country: France
- Region: Auvergne-Rhône-Alpes
- Department: Ain
- Arrondissement: Belley
- Canton: Belley
- Intercommunality: Bugey Sud

Government
  - Mayor (2026–32): Gael Raffron
- Area^{1}: 5.88 km^{2} (2.27 sq mi)
- Elevation: 430 m (1,410 ft)
- Highest elevation: 940 m (3,080 ft)
- Lowest elevation: 330 m (1,080 ft)
- Population (2023): 115
  - Density: 19.6/km^{2} (50.7/sq mi)
- Demonym: Ambléonais
- Time zone: UTC+01:00 (CET)
  - Summer (DST): UTC+02:00 (CEST)
- INSEE/Postal code: 01006 /01300
- ^{1} French Land Register data, which excludes lakes, ponds, glaciers > 1 km^{2} (0.386 sq mi or 247 acres) and river estuaries.

Ambléon (French pronunciation: [ɑ̃bleɔ̃]) is a rural commune in the Ain department in the Auvergne-Rhône-Alpes region of central-eastern France.

== Geography ==
The village of Ambléon is located ten kilometres west of Belley and 60 km east of Lyon in a wetland (lakes, swamps, bogs) in the Bas-Bugey mountain range, 400 metres above sea level. The site is dominated by the Tentanet mountain (1019 m) on the slopes of which is the Lac d'Ambléon of glacial origin whose ecological interest is recognised.

Access to the commune is by road D24 which branches from the D10 south of the commune (north of Premeyzel) and passes through the commune to the village then continues north to join the D41 just north of the commune. The D41 road comes from Saint-Germain-les-Paroisses in the north through the commune then passes near Lac d'Ambléon before continuing over the mountains west to join the D79 road near Lhuis. The D41 does not pass through the village but there is a connecting country road from it to the village. There are a few other small country roads in the commune. There is some farming activity along the D24 road but most of the commune is forested hills and mountains.

The Serrin stream rises to the west of the village and passes through it before joining the Setrin stream which flows south through the commune to join the Gland stream south of the commune.

== Administration ==
List of successive mayors of Ambléon

From	To	Name	Party	Position
1947	1965	Joannès Pezant		
1965	1983	Jean Guillot		
1983	2008	Henri Guillot	DVD	
2008	2011	Odette Breidenstein-Jullien		
2011	2026	Annie Bionda		Postmistress
2026	incumbent	Gael Raffron		

== Population ==
Historical population
Year	Pop.	±% p.a.
1968	108	—
1975	82	−3.86%
1982	65	−3.26%
1990	76	+1.97%
1999	86	+1.38%
2007	125	+4.79%
2012	110	−2.52%
2017	111	+0.18%
2023	115	+0.59%
Source: INSEE

== Economy ==
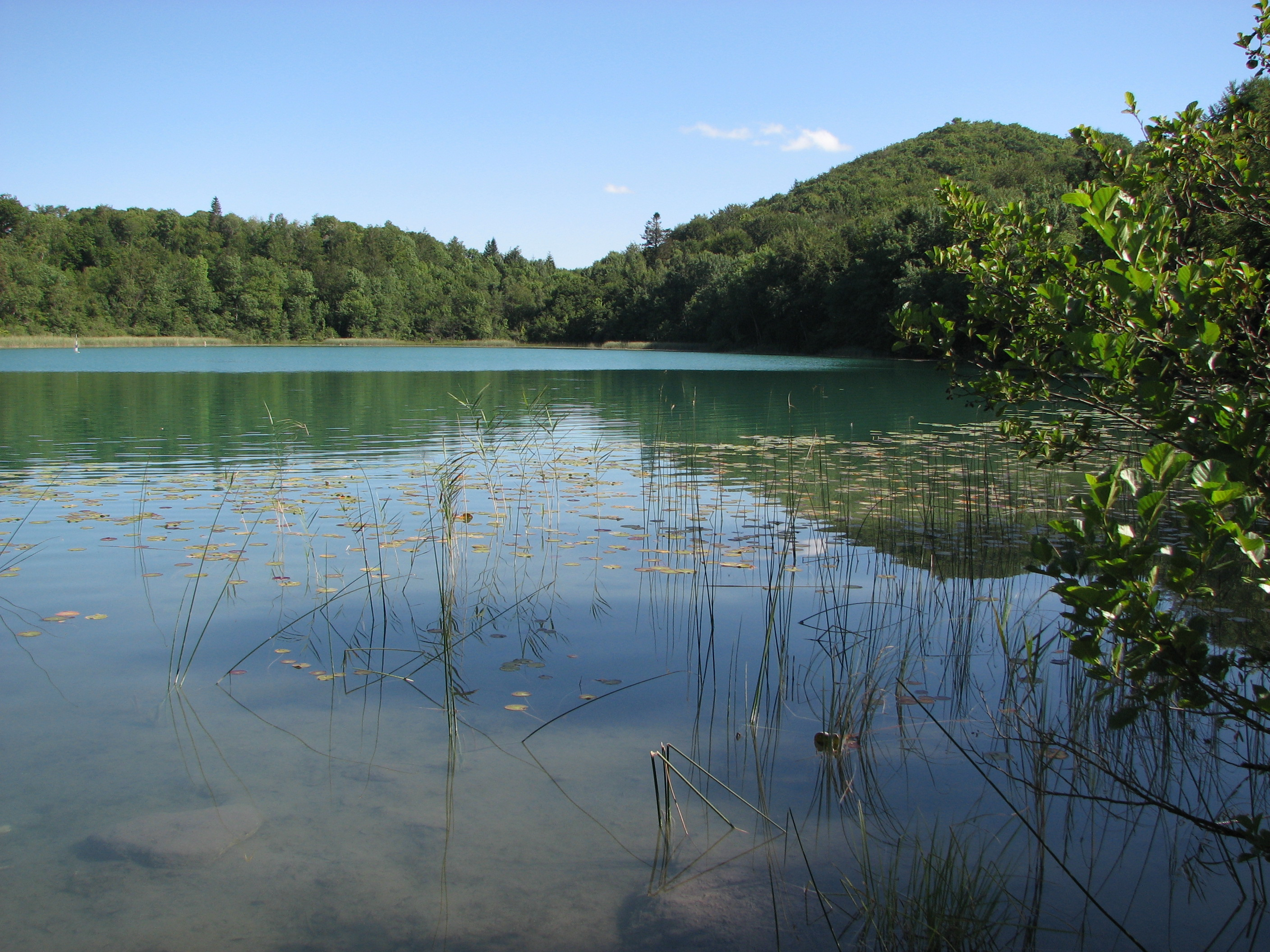
Lac d'Ambléon

The Ambléon economy is based on agriculture (livestock and grain).

The town is located within the Appellation d'origine contrôlée (AOC) zone for the wines of Bugey.

== Sights ==
- The Château of Ambléon (private residence)
- A chapel (13th century)
- The war memorial to the maquis of Ambléon

== Personalities ==
- Theodore Chavanton called Avanton, author of the folk novel The Lost Oasis (1945) and a teacher at the Ambléon school. His story takes place in Lombane (an anagram of Ambléon)

== See also ==
- Communes of the Ain department
