= Olifant (instrument) =

Horn instrument made from ivory

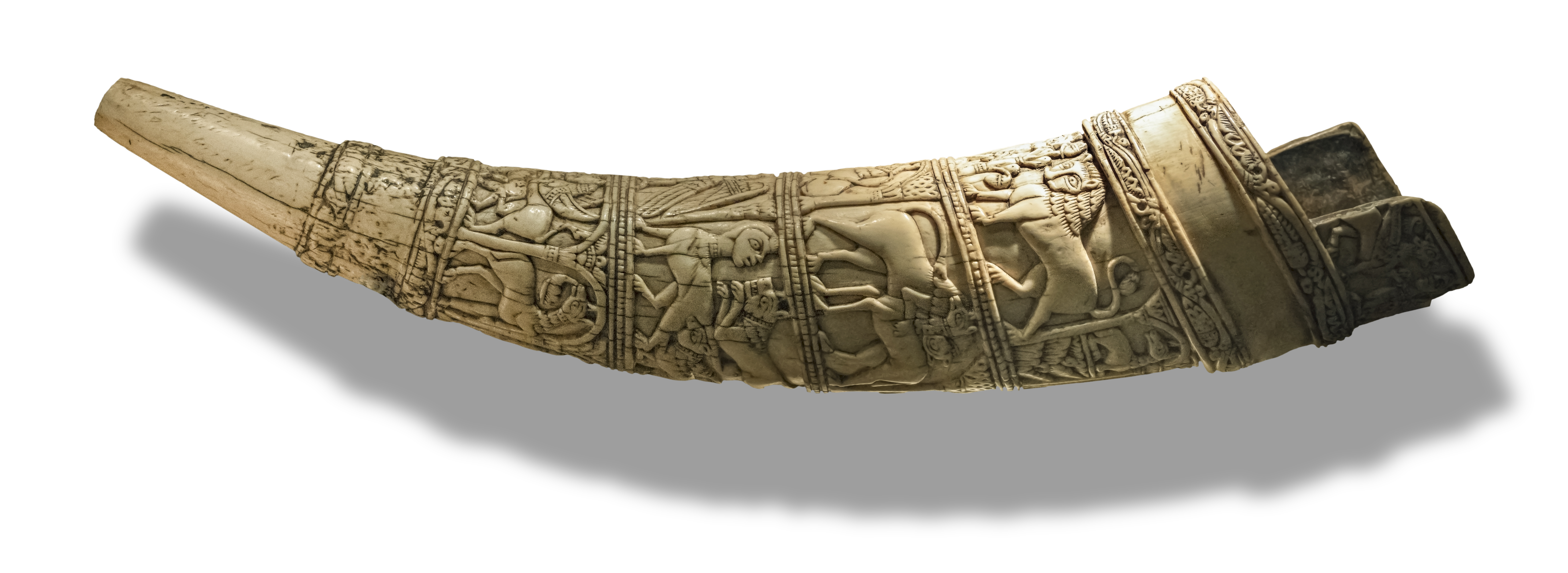
Olifant from the Le Musée Paul Dupuy of Toulouse

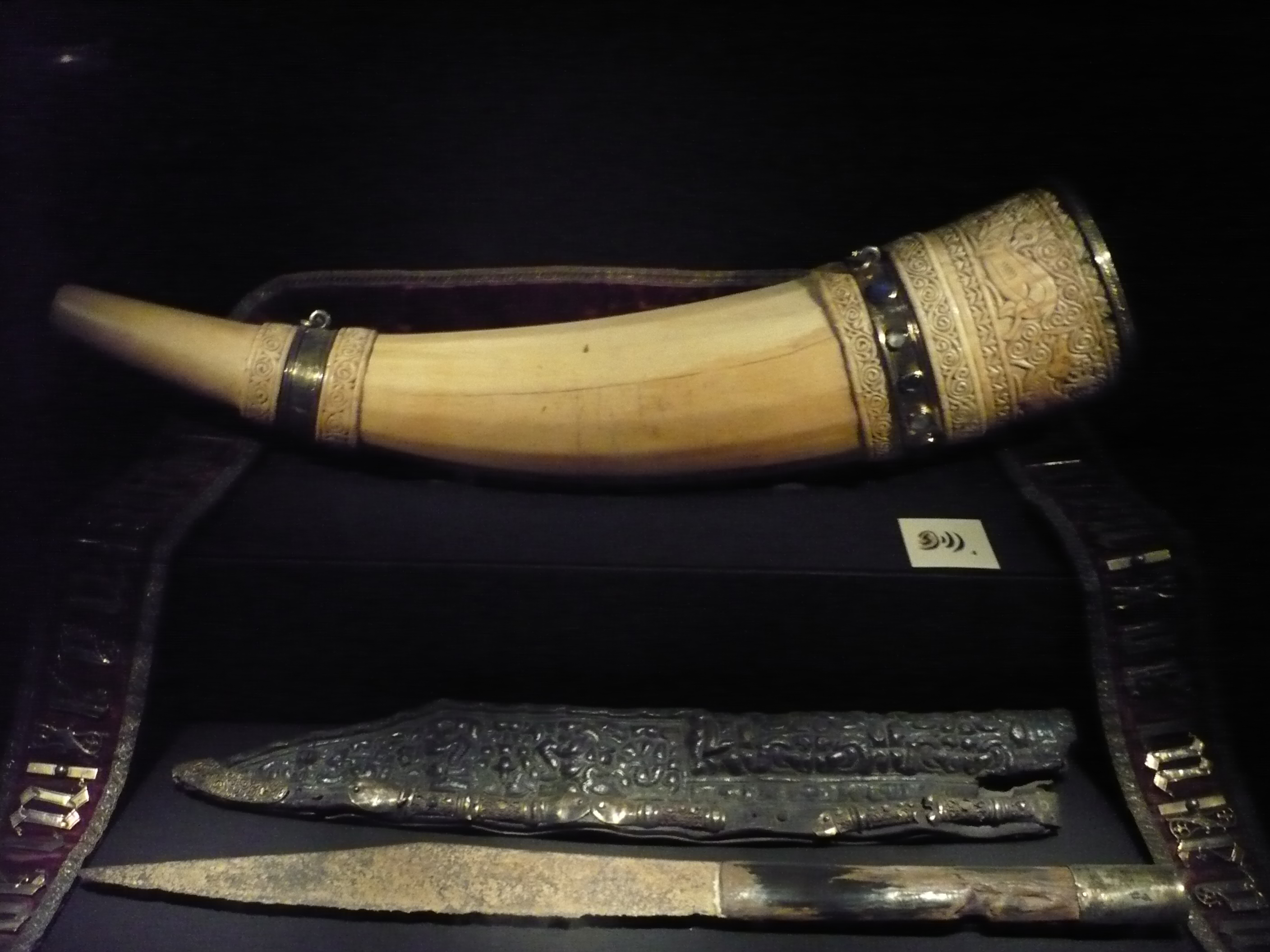
Olifant from the treasury of Aachen Cathedral

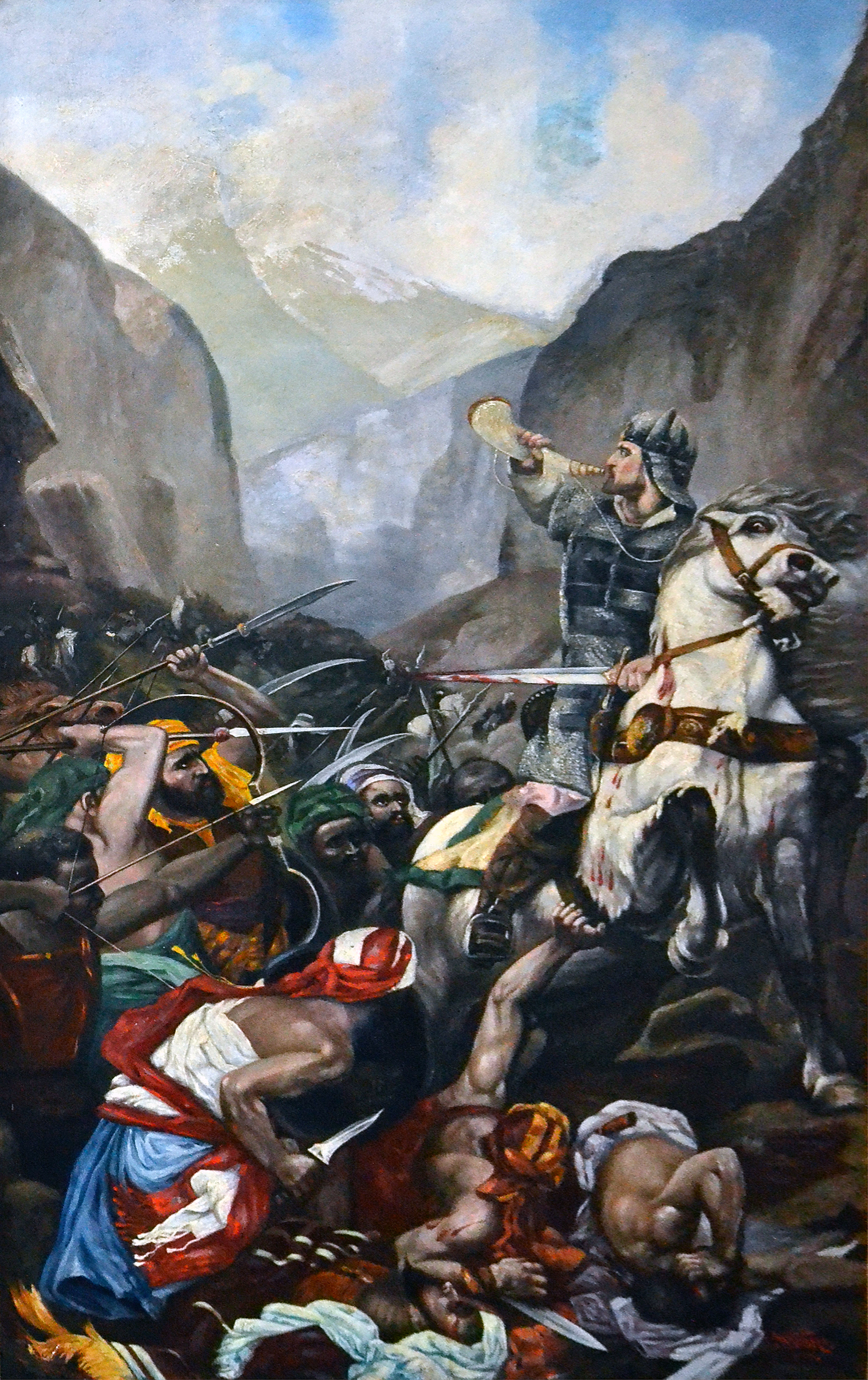
Roland blows his olifant to summon help in the midst of the Battle of Roncevaux.

Olifant (also known as oliphant) was the name applied in the Middle Ages to a type of carved ivory hunting horn created from elephant tusks. Olifants were most prominently used in Europe from roughly the tenth to the sixteenth century, although there are later examples. The surviving inventories of Renaissance treasuries and armories document that Europeans, especially in France, Germany, and England, owned trumpets in a variety of media that were used to signal, both in war and hunting. They were manufactured primarily in Italy (from either African or Indian elephant tusk), but towards the end of the fifteenth and early sixteenth centuries, they were also made in Africa for a European market. Typically, they were made with relief carvings that showed animal and human combat scenes, hunting scenes, fantastic beasts, and European heraldry. About seventy-five ivory hunting horns survive and about half can be found in museums and church treasuries, while others are in private collections or their locations remain unknown.

== Etymology ==
The word olifant (or alternatively oliphant) was originally derived from the Latin word for elephant, representing the ivory tusks used to create the instrument. The first documented use of the word olifant to define a hunting horn appears in La Chanson de Roland (or The Song of Roland), a French epic poem from the eleventh century. In the poem, the central character, Roland, carries his olifant while serving on the rearguard of Charlemagne's army. When they are attacked at the Battle of Roncevaux, Oliver tells Roland to use it to call for aid, but he refuses. Roland finally relents, but the battle is already lost. He tries to destroy the olifant along with his sword Durendal, lest they fall into enemy hands. In the end, Roland blows the horn, but the force required bursts his temple, resulting in his death. Roland's use of the olifant may have popularized it as the quintessential "hero's horn".

The Karlamagnussaga elaborates (V. c.XIV) that Roland's olifant was a unicorn's horn, hunted in India. Another famous olifant belonged to Gaston IV, viscount of Béarn, and is now preserved in the Spanish city of Saragossa, which he helped reconquer from the Banu Hud.

== Uses ==
Olifants made great hunting devices because they were neither too loud nor as slow as matchlock guns. Saint Roland was said to have used this horn for hunting as well as war. Additionally, these horns sometimes had a religious function. For example, olifants were suspended over the high altars in churches, as was recorded in a 1315 archival document describing an ivory horn that hung over the high altar of Canterbury Cathedral. Ivory olifants would be used to call people to prayer on special feast days, like the three days preceding Good Friday, when monks used ivory "calling" horns instead of the usual metal bells. It is believe the Horn of Saint Blaise at the Cleveland Museum of Art was used in this way.

While the olifant's use as an instrument was its primary function, even though it was hard to blow, it had a multitude of uses. For instance, some horns had a plug added to the short end thereby allowing the horn to be used as a drinking vessel. However, because of their cumbersome size and hefty weight, horns were not the most convenient receptacle for drinking. During the Middle Ages, at the Cathedral of York Minster, a fourteenth-century chronicle reports that the Oliphant of Ulph was filled with wine and then placed on the high altar by Ulph, a Viking nobleman, as a way to transfer lands to the cathedral. This event happened around the year 1036, thus offering scholars a clear terminus ante quem.

Additionally, olifants were often given as diplomatic gifts. One such olifant ended up in the Medici collection (now at Palazzo Pitti, Museo degli Argenti, Florence), the first ivory object to end up in a European collection. This object may have been given as gift from the King of Congo, Nzinga-a-Nkuwu, known as João I of Kongo to the Pope. The olifant was listed in the 1553 inventory of Cosimo de' Medici.

== Place of manufacture ==
=== Italy ===
Among the earliest extant ivory horns carved with bands of low relief have been attributed to the workshops in Salerno, Italy. This group is collectively known as "Salerno ivories", as they all may have been originally housed in the collection of the Treasury of Salerno Cathedral. It is believed that they may have actually been part of the door leading to the chancel of the same cathedral. However, because of the similarities between these ivories and the style of stone sculptures from the eleventh and twelfth centuries that were produced in the regions of Apulia and Campania, scholars believe that olifants were probably made in Amalfi during the end of the eleventh century. The city of Amalfi had long-established trade connections with places like Sicily, North Africa, Cairo, Antioch, and Alexandria. These ivory horns, therefore, had strong connections to the East (the "Orient"), since they were often crafted by Arab artists that had contacts for procuring ivory. Moreover, the Islamic motifs that can be found on many of them were likely inspired by exotic clothes that had been imported to Europe as well.

Several survive in various collections, including: the oliphant of the Chartreuse de Portes (in the Cabinet de Médailles of the Bibliothèque nationale de France, Paris); two oliphants in the Boston Museum of Fine Arts (one from Salerno, while the other was possible made in Amalfi); the horn of Muri Abbey conserved in Kunsthistoriches Museum in Vienna; the so-called Horn of Saint Blaise at the Cleveland Museum of Art; as well as other oliphants from the treasuries of the Basilica of St. Sernin, Toulouse, and Saragossa Cathedral.

The Horn or Oliphant of Ulph, preserved in the treasury of York Minster, is part of the above group olifants that were carved in either Salerno or Amalfi in the first half of the eleventh century. While various animals like griffons and unicorns are found in low-relief carving on the Oliphant of Ulph, much of this imagery was likely Islamic in origin, recalling ancient art from Babylonia and Syria.

=== Africa ===
Some olifants were carved in Africa were exported for European use. These horns are transverse trumpets including a lateral mouthpiece, often smooth, to be set into the concave part of the tusk. They were blown singularly and often used at solemn occasions like funerals. Though olifants were made by Africans with tusks from African elephants and African carving techniques, the artists incorporated European iconography into the designs. This mix illustrates the result of intercultural trade that encouraged cross-cultural interactions and exchanges within the medieval period. The addition of imagery of animals like crocodiles and serpents help identify the instruments as African in origin, as these motifs are found in traditional African iconography. Small animals with slim bodies, not yet identified, are also likely indicative of African manufacture.

==== Sapi-Portuguese olifants ====
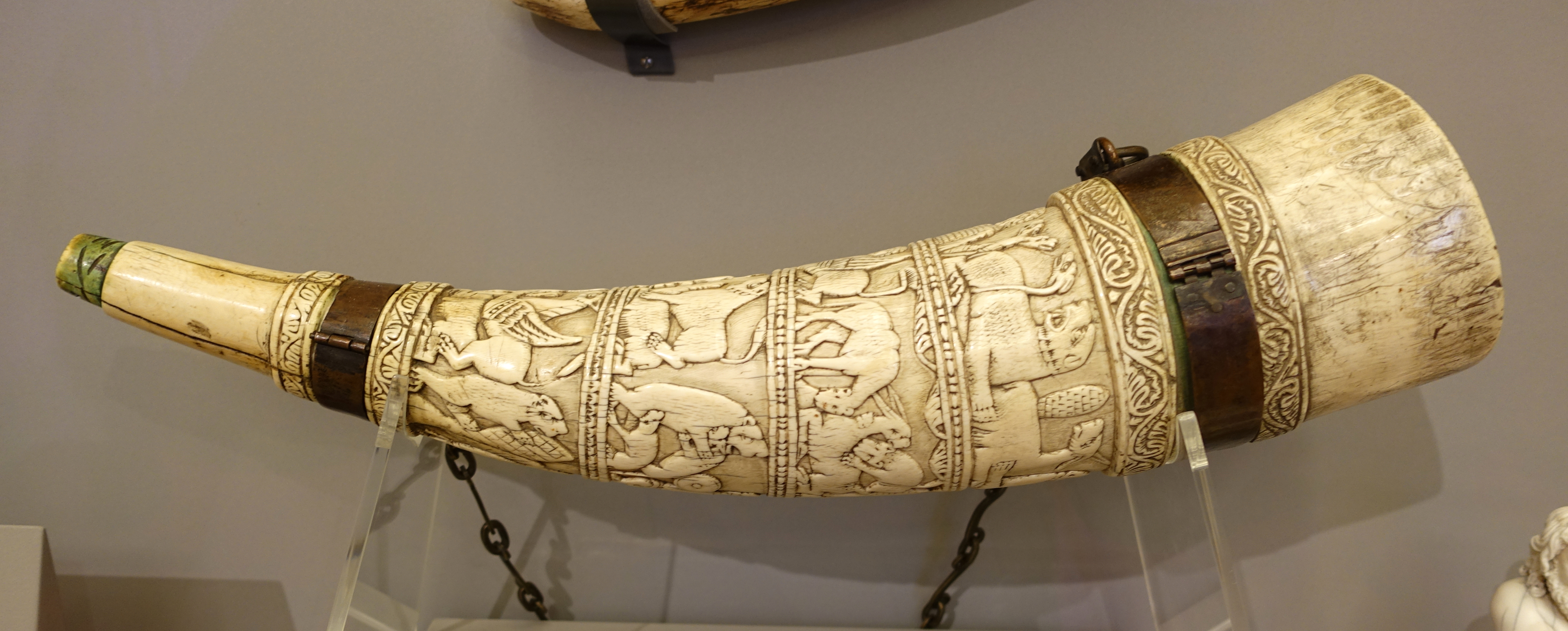
An apical Sapo-Portuguese olifant featuring lugs and a chain used for carrying purposes

Olifants that are classified as "Sapi-Portuguese" are so identified in fifteenth-century Portuguese documents by the blanket term "Sapi" or "Sape" to describe production by West African Temne or Bullom artists, as well as people originating from Sierra Leone who have common language and cultural similarities. These olifants were part of a larger group of other carved ivory pieces by the Sapi like salt cellars, spoons, hunting horns, and other objects made from the fifteenth to seventeenth centuries. The olifants made for the European market differed from those made for African use in the placement of the mouthpieces: those for the Europeans have apical mouthpieces, producing sound through a mouthpiece on the tip of the tusk; by contrast, olifants made for African use had a laterally-oriented mouthpiece. The placement of this mouthpiece is decorated with the jaws of an animal with markedly big teeth and small, pointed ears. Moreover, the olifants made for the Europeans also include lugs, or hinges, for the purpose of attaching a strap, cord, chain or belt so that the horn could be suspended, allowing to worn over one's shoulder. These lugs were derived from European weapons such as the rings to raise a cannon, known as "dolphins". They were given the name most likely because the form of these lugs often resembled a fish whose back was arched, or more rarely they were shaped as an wyvern, a distinct European motif. All these components show that such objects were made for European consumption. The cross-cultural characteristics of these objects indicate African craftsmanship with European imagery that remains captivating to specialists.

== Relief carving and imagery ==
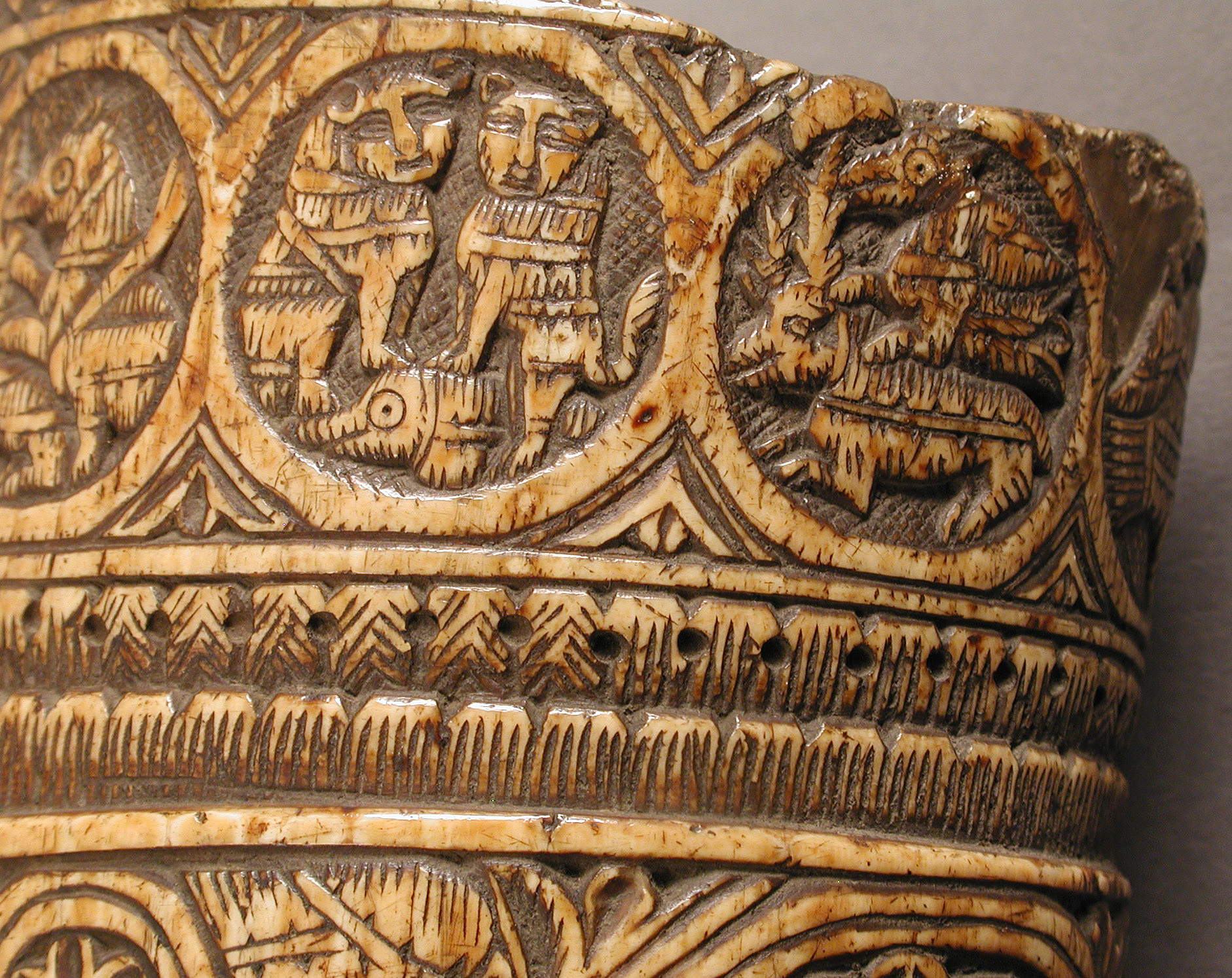
Detailing of an olifant with bas relief carvings of various animals

While the shape of olifants remains largely similar, these instruments feature multiple styles of carving. Some include bas-relief carvings with largely European subject matter, while others are carved in high-relief f that is a more traditionally African style.

=== African motifs ===
One thing often seen in olifants is the use of traditionally African patterns. These carvings are often geometric and highly intricate in nature. It serves to add to the design of the olifant without fundamentally changing its form.

=== Animals ===
One subject carved into olifants is a variety of animals. Some olifants include both fighting and hunting scenes, often including dogs and game. More exotic animals are also present, including elephants, rhinos, lions, serpents, and crocodiles. The presence of birds with intertwined necks, which is likely of Sasanian origin, appears on ivories made in Ceylon for the Portuguese.

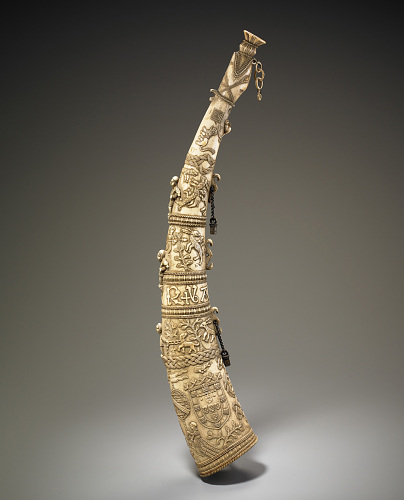
Sapi-Portuguese style hunting horn, late 15th century – National Museum of African Art Collection, Smithsonian Institution

=== European heraldry ===
Some olifants also include coats of arms from European different rulers. For instance, one olifant formerly in the collection of Drummond Castle (purchased in 1979 by the National Museum of Australia, in Canberra inv. no.79.2148) features the coat of arms of Manuel I of Portugal, as well as those of King Ferdinand II of Aragon and Isabella I of Castile of Spain. The olifant, made by Sapi artists, was commissioned by a European patron to commemorate the marriage of Manuel I to Maria of Aragon (the daughter of Ferdinand and Isabella) on October 30, 1500, thereby allowing scholars to more accurately date this object. This horn, along with two others that have the same heraldry, may be the earliest dated works by an African artist. Extremely decorated, its mouthpiece is placed at the end (unlike horns made for African use, which places the mouthpiece on the side) emerges from the mouth of the remarkable animal head. Three miniature figures in high relief are placed along the outer curve of the horn. Seven registers separated by bands of braid and geometric relief decoration including hunting scenes were based on European sources. At the bottom lies a register decorated with "Ave Maria" in Gothic lettering, while above is a broader register that contain the arms and mottos of both families joined in marriage.

== In European inventories and collections ==
Olifants were omnipresent throughout Europe. Inventories of the Renaissance treasuries and armories contain many trumpets in ivory, metal, wood, used for signaling, hunting, and battle. In the 1507 inventory of Alvaro Borges, a note is recorded about the bill of sale for the deceased man's possessions, including various African objects along with a "small ivory". An ivory bugle is listed in the inventory of the possessions of André Marques, a navigator who died aboard the caravel Santiago during a voyage from São Tomé to Portugal. In addition, artwork from Benin and Sierra Leone were also considered Afro-Portuguese art that would also appear in European collections. A noteworthy insight is that the people of these African regions had their own artistic traditions that had existed before their first contact with the Portuguese, and these objects were very sought after by European collectors.

== Depictions in fiction ==
In Washington Irving's 1809 fictional A History of New York, the trumpeter Anthony Van Corlaer blows a mock-heroic last blast of warning before drowning in Spuyten Duyvil Creek.

The Horn of Gondor, held by Boromir, from Tolkien's Lord of the Rings seems to have been based on the medieval olifant. There is a connection to the Song of Roland in the novels and movies, when Boromir blows the horn at the battle of Amon Hen to try to summon help from the other members of the Fellowship of the Ring. For Boromir, like Roland, this action comes too late, as he is mortally wounded with several arrows shot by an Orc archer by the time Aragorn and the others reach him.

The horn was later presented to Denethor, Steward of Gondor as proof of his son's death. In the movie of The Return of the King, he holds the horn, now split in two, and demands an explanation for what happened from the wizard Gandalf.

Queen Susan Pevensie's horn in the Chronicles of Narnia series also resembles an olifant, and it was said that whenever it was blown "help would certainly come" to whoever had blown it. Queen Susan blows it to summon assistance against the wolf Maugrim, captain of the White Witch's secret police, in The Lion the Witch and the Wardrobe, and later uses it as a hunting horn. In Prince Caspian it magically summons the four Pevensie children back to Narnia when it is blown by the young Caspian the Tenth to help defeat his usurping uncle Miraz.

In the Jumanji episode "The Law of Jumanji", the big game hunter Van Pelt uses an olifant to summon vicious mastiffs who act as his enforcers when hunting prey including fellow humans.
