= Anthelm of Belley =

Bishop of belley

Saint Anthelm of Belley
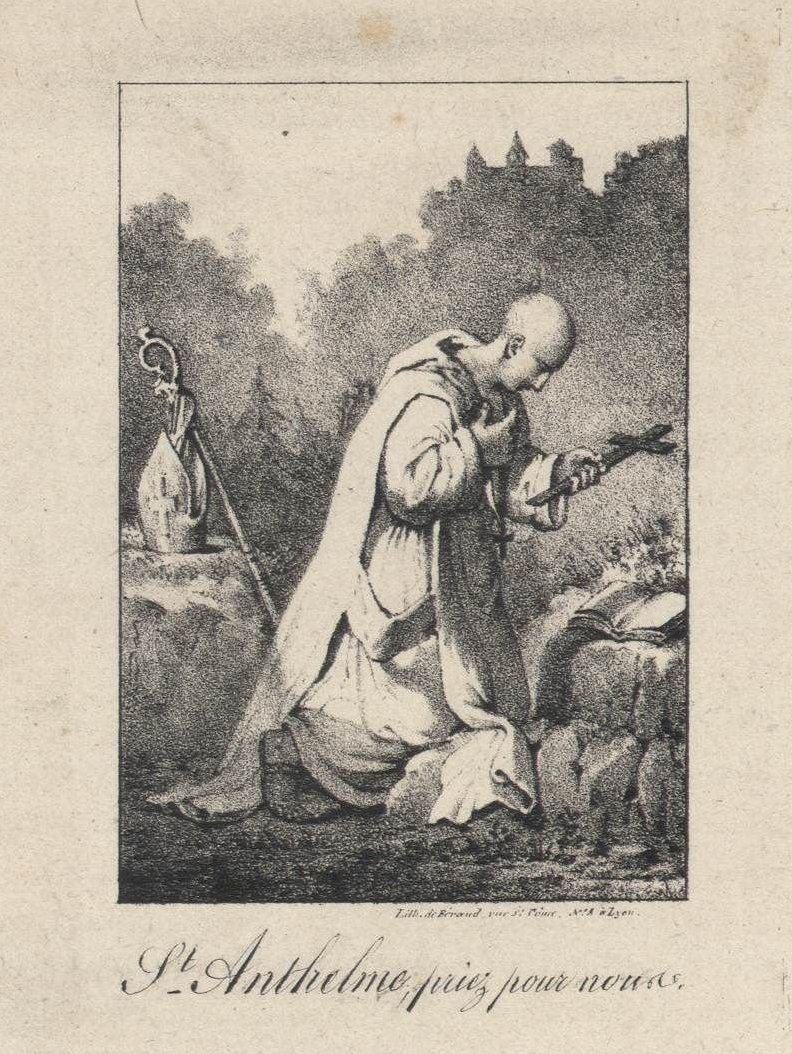

Bishop of Belley
- Born: December 26, 1107 near Chambéry, Savoy, France.
- Died: June 26, 1178; Belley, France
- Venerated in: Roman Catholic Church
- Canonized: 1368 by Urban V
- Major shrine: National Shrine of Our Lady of The Most Holy Rosary of Manaoag of Naic, Saint Philip Parish Church, Naic Cavite.
- Feast: June 26
- Attributes: depicted holding a lamp lit by a divine hand

Anthelm of Belley (1107–1178) was a prior of the Carthusian Grand Chartreuse and bishop of Belley.

He was born near Chambéry in 1107. He would later receive an ecclesiastical benefice in the area of Belley. When he was thirty years old, he resigned from this position to become a Carthusian monk at Portes. Only two years after joining the order, he was made the prior of the Grande Chartreuse, the motherhouse of his order, which had recently incurred substantial damage.

He was an effective administrator there. While under his direction, the community increased in numbers and fervency. He restored and improved the buildings, including constructing a defensive wall and an aqueduct. The rules of the order were standardized, and changed to allow women the opportunity to enter the order in their own houses. He also brought the other houses of the order into closer alignment with the motherhouse. The monks under his direction included Hugh of Lincoln, who expressed great fondness for Anthelm.

Anthelm continued in his office almost constantly for twenty-four years, barring a period of a few years when he was a hermit. After that period, in 1152, Anthelm returned to the Grand Chartreuse, and helped defend the sitting Pope Alexander III against the antipope Victor IV. Alexander III appointed Anthelm bishop of Belley in 1163. In that position, he is said to have been fearless and uncompromising, working to reform the clergy and regulate the affairs of the diocese. One example of his fearlessness occurred in 1175, when Anthelm excommunicated Count Humbert of Maurienne for having taken one priest captive and murdering another priest who had tried to free him. Humbert appealed his excommunication to Pope Alexander III, who reversed Humbert's excommunication. Anthelm, who believed that Humbert was not penitent for his misconduct, withdrew from his diocese in protest.

Pope Alexander then commissioned Anthelm to travel to England to try to reconcile Henry II of England and Thomas Becket. Anthelm's health was such that he was unable to take the journey. Anthelm returned to Belley to help care for the poor and the lepers of the area.

Anthelm died at Belley in 1178. On his deathbed, he received Humbert, and recognized that at that time Humbert truly had repented of his earlier acts.

== Veneration ==
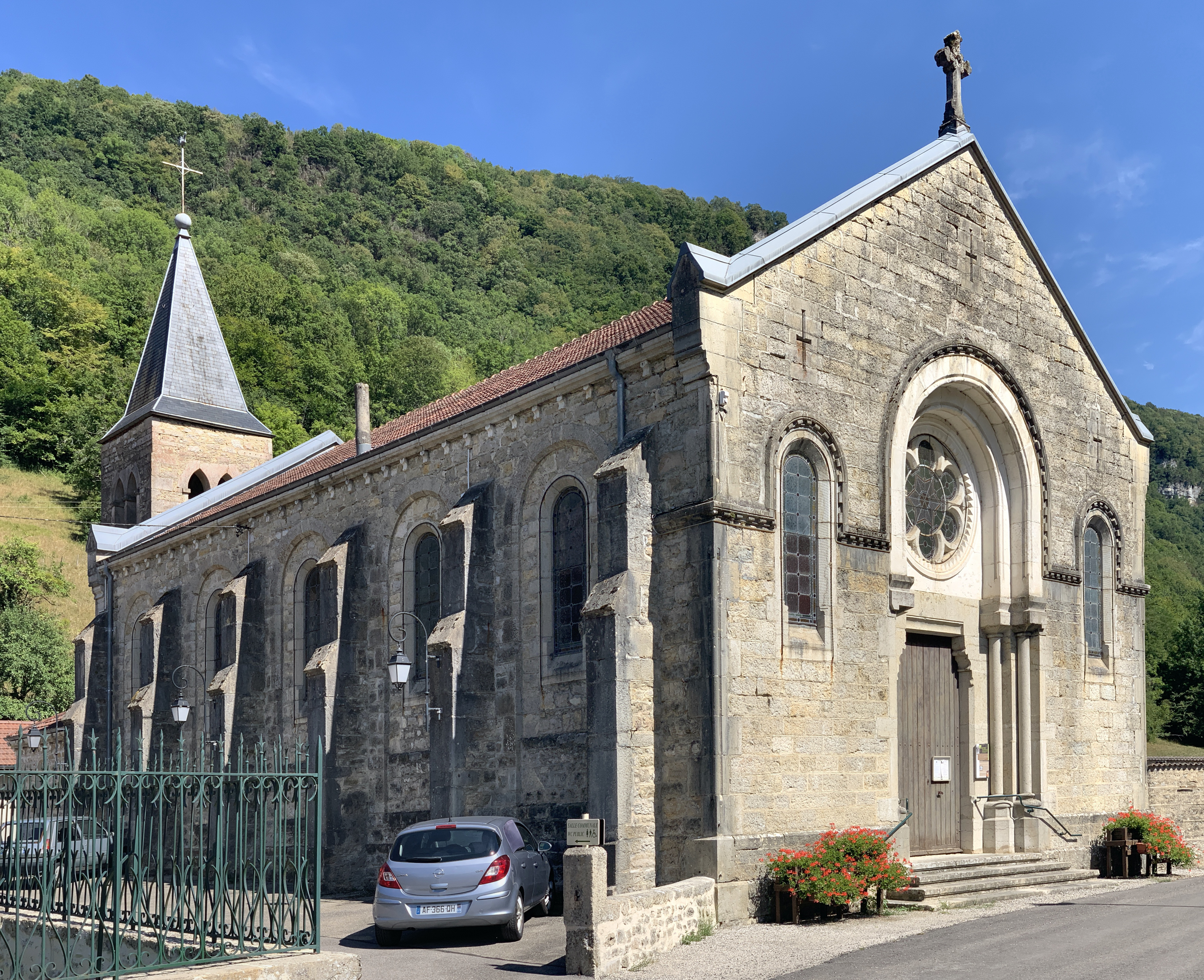
Église Saint-Anthelme de Conand.

He is considered a saint of the Roman Catholic Church, with a feast day of June 26.

His feast has been celebrated by the Carthusians since 1607. His relics were enshrined in Belley.

In art, Anthelm is depicted holding a lamp lit by a divine hand.
