= Diocese of Belley–Ars =

Latin Catholic territory in France

Coordinates: 46°12′17″N 5°13′32″E

Diocese of Belley–Ars Dioecesis Bellicensis–Arsensis Diocèse de Belley–Ars

Catholic
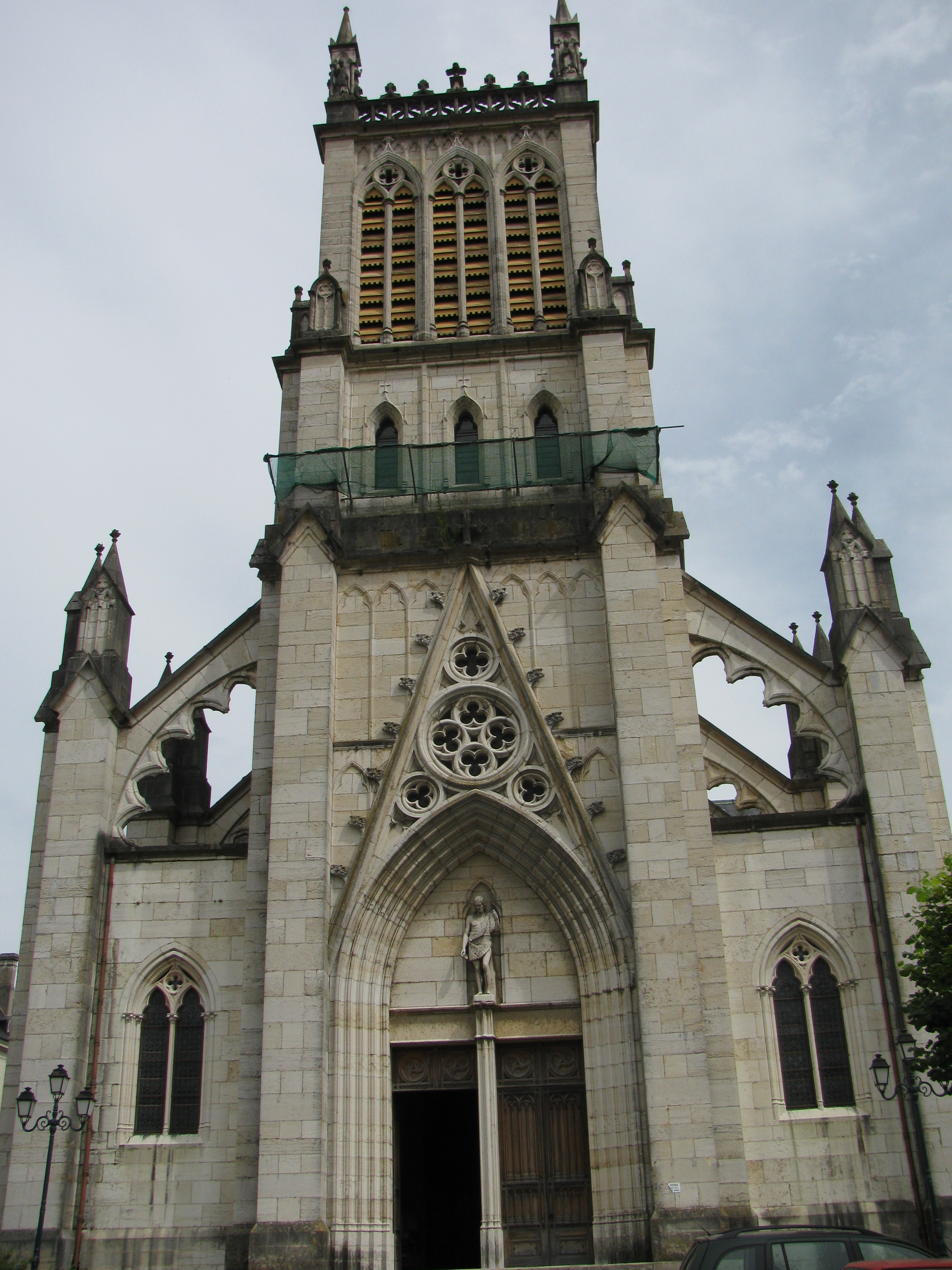
- Belley Cathedral

Location
- Country: France
- Ecclesiastical province: Lyon

Statistics
- Area: 5,554 km^{2} (2,144 sq mi)
- Population: Total; Catholics: (as of 2022); 647,634▲; 382,000 (est.)
- Parishes: 110▼

Information
- Denomination: Catholic Church
- Sui iuris church: Latin Church
- Rite: Roman Rite
- Established: 5th Century
- Cathedral: Cathedral of St. John the Baptist in Belley
- Patron saint: St. John the Baptist
- Secular priests: 125 diocesan▼10 (Religious Orders)▼14 Permanent Deacons

Current leadership
- Pope: Leo XIV
- Bishop: Pascal Marie Roland
- Metropolitan Archbishop: Olivier de Germay
- Bishops emeritus: Guy Claude Bagnard, Bishop Emeritus (1987–2012)

Map

Website
- Website of the Diocese (in French)

The Diocese of Belley–Ars (Latin: Dioecesis Bellicensis–Arsensis; French: Diocèse de Belley–Ars) is a Latin Church ecclesiastical jurisdiction or diocese of the Catholic Church in France. Erected in the 5th century, the diocese was renamed in 1988 from the former Diocese of Belley to the Diocese of Belley–Ars. Coextensive with the civil department of Ain, in the Region of Rhône-Alpes, the diocese is a suffragan see of the Archdiocese of Lyon. The cathedra of the bishop is at Belley Cathedral.

Although suppressed at the time of the Napoleonic Concordat (1801), the Diocese of Belley was re-established in 1822 and took from the Archdiocese of Lyon the arrondissements of Belley, Bourg, Nantua and Trévoux, and from the Archdiocese of Chambéry the Arrondissement of Gex.

== History ==
Local tradition maintains that Belley was evangelized in the 2nd century by the martyrs Marcellus and Valerian, companions of St. Pothinus. The first bishop of historic certainty is Vincentius, mentioned in 552. In the 16th century, a citizen of Belley, Christian Urst, produced a theory, adopted by 17th-century authors including Samuel Guichenon, that the diocese of Belley had come into being when the city of Nyon on Lake Geneva was destroyed by the Burgundians, and the bishop's seat was removed to Belley. This theory, with no evidence to support it, has been abandoned.

In the Treaty of Verdun of 10 August 843, the territory which included the city and diocese of Belley were assigned, by agreement of Charles the Bald, Lothair, and Louis the German, to the kingdom of Lothair, which included Burgundy, Savoy, and northern Italy. In July 879, Boso of Provence repudiated his allegiance to the family of Charlemagne, and established his own kingdom, usually called the Kingdom of Provence. It included southern Lotharingia, Burgundy, the kingdom of Arles, and the kingdom of Provence. On 15 October 879, the bishops and nobility of these areas met at the Synod of Mantaille in Provence, and elected Boso as their king. Belley thus ceased to be Frankish.

In the early 12th century, Count Amadeus III of Savoy obtained control over Belley and the Bugey. In 1535, Francis I of France invaded the territory of Savoy, and held it until the Treaty of Cateau-Cambrésis in 1559.

Pope Innocent II issued a bull for the new Bishop Guillaume of Bellay on 4 December 1142, taking the diocese under his protection, and guaranteeing the benefices which constituted the bishop's income. He also ordered that the cathedral Chapter be composed of Canons Regular, under the Rule of S. Augustine, rather than secular priests; and that the Canons Regular have the exclusive right to elect the bishop. Before 1142, the secular canons numbered 24. In a reorganization of 1578, there came to be 6 dignities and 19 canons. In 1678, the Chapter was composed of 7 dignities (the Prior, the Archdeacon, the Infirmarius, the Chamberlain, the Dean, the Treasurer, and the Sacristan) and 18 canons prebendary; in 1745, there were 3 dignities and 13 canons.

King Henry IV of France acquired the territory in which the diocese of Belley is located from Savoy in the Treaty of Lyon in 1601. The treaty was negotiated with the help of Cardinal Pietro Aldobrandini, the nephew of Pope Clement VIII. The first bishop of Belley appointed by the French was Jean-Pierre Camus (1608–1629), the author of more than 150 volumes, including L' esprit de saint François de Sales.

=== French Revolution ===
Even before it directed its attention to the Church directly, the National Constituent Assembly attacked the institution of monasticism. On 13 February 1790. it issued a decree which stated that the government would no longer recognize solemn religious vows taken by either men or women. In consequence, Orders and Congregations which lived under a Rule were suppressed in France. Members of either sex were free to leave their monasteries or convents if they wished, and could claim an appropriate pension by applying to the local municipal authority.

The National Constituent Assembly ordered the replacement of political subdivisions of the ancien régime with subdivisions called "departments", to be characterized by a single administrative city in the center of a compact area. The decree was passed on 22 December 1789, the boundaries fixed on 26 February 1790, with the institution to be effective on 4 March 1790. A new department was created called "Ain," and Belley became the principal city in the department. The National Constituent Assembly then, on 6 February 1790, instructed its ecclesiastical committee to prepare a plan for the reorganization of the clergy. At the end of May, its work was presented as a draft Civil Constitution of the Clergy, which, after vigorous debate, was approved on 12 July 1790. There was to be one diocese in each department, requiring the suppression of approximately fifty dioceses. The "Metropole de l'Est" was created, and the diocese of the department of "Ain" was included in it. The seat of the bishop of Ain was fixed at Belley.

In the Civil Constitution of the Clergy, the National Constituent Assembly also abolished cathedral chapters, canonicates, prebends, chapters and dignities of collegiate churches, chapters of both secular and regular clergy of both sexes, and abbeys and priories whether existing under a Rule or in commendam.

Angered by the almost universal disdain of the French episcopate, as well as the opposition of the majority of the clergy, the National Assembly issued a decree on 17 November 1790, requiring the swearing of an oath of allegiance to the Civil Constitution of the Clergy and to the national constitution, still in preparation. Penalties for refusing to swear the required oath were loss of income, deposition from office, arrest, trial, and deportation. Gabriel Cortois de Quincey, who had been the legitimate bishop of Belley since 1751, refused to take the oath, but before action could be taken against him, he died, on 14 January 1791.

The electors of the department of Ain, not all of whom were Catholic, met at Bourg, and on 6 February elected as their constitutional bishop Jean Baptiste Royer, the parish priest of Chavannes-sur-Suran, some 20 km northeast of Bourg-en-Bresse. He was not present, since he had been elected to the Estates General of 1789, then in 1792 to the Convention, and continued on in Paris. He was consecrated, in a ceremony which was both schismatic and blasphemous, on 3 April 1791 in Paris at Nôtre-Dame, by Antoine-Adrien Lamourette, the constitutional bishop of Lyon. He visited Belley for his installation, but in September 1792 returned to Paris to continue his political work. He was imprisoned during the Terror. He became one of the leaders of the restored Constitutional Church, and was elected bishop of Paris in August 1795. Belley was without a bishop until the diocese was suppressed by Pope Pius VII in 1801.

In 1799, the number of constitutional priests in the diocese was more or less 80, though the conduct of some 20 of them was equivocal or suspected of taking the oath to the Civil Constitution merely for the job.

=== Restoration of the French hierarchy ===
The French Directory fell in the coup engineered by Talleyrand and Napoleon on 10 November 1799. The coup resulted in the establishment of the French Consulate, with Napoleon as the First Consul. To advance his aggressive military foreign policy, he decided to make peace with the Catholic Church and the Papacy. This included the liquidation of the Constitutional Church. On 29 November 1801, in the concordat of 1801 between the French Consulate, headed by First Consul Napoleon Bonaparte, and Pope Pius VII, the bishopric of Ain (Belley) and all the other dioceses in France were suppressed. This removed all the institutional contaminations and novelties introduced by the Constitutional Church. The diocesan structure was then re-established, including the metropolitan archdiocese of Besançon, though the diocese of Belley was not revived.

In 1814, the French monarchy was restored, and on 24 May 1814, the pope returned to Rome from exile in Savona. Work began immediately on a new concordat, to regularize the relations between the two parties. In implementation of the concordat of 27 July 1817, between King Louis XVIII and Pope Pius VII, the diocese of Belley should have been restored by the bull "Commissa divinitus", but the French Parliament refused to ratify the agreement. It was not until 6 October 1822 that a revised version of the papal bull, now called "Paternae Charitatis" , fortified by an ordonnance of Louis XVIII of 13 January 1823, received the acceptance of all parties. The diocese of Belley became a suffragan of the archdiocese of Besancon.

=== Adjustment of borders ===
On 26 January 1965, in consideration of anomalies of the dioceses of Belley and Geneva with respect to the civil boundaries of France and Switzerland, Pope Paul VI ordered that the area of the municipality called the Grand Sacconex be removed from the diocese of Geneva and annexed to the diocese of Belley; and that the area of the municipality called Ferney-Voltaire be removed from Belley and annexed to Geneva.

The name of the diocese of Belley was changed by order of Pope John Paul II on 23 January 1988, by the addition of the name of the commune of Ars to the official name of the diocese. The change was made as a gesture in honor of Jean-Marie Vianney, the curé of Ars.

=== Notable persons of Belley ===
Belley honours Saint-Vulbas, a patrician of Bourgogne and a war companion of King Dagobert I; Saint Rambert, killed by order of Ebroin in the 7th century, whose name has been given to Saint-Rambert-en-Bugey, a city in the diocese; Saint Trivier, the solitary, who died about 650; Saint Barnard of Vienne (9th century), who founded the great Benedictine Abbey of Ambronay (destroyed during the French Revolution) and died the Archbishop of Vienna; St. Lambert (12th century), first abbot of the Cistercian Abbey at Chézery, now in the diocese of Annecy; St. Roland, Abbot of Chézery during the 12th century; Saint Stephen of Châtillon, who founded the Carthusian monastery at Portes in 1115, and died Bishop of Die; Saint Stephen of Bourg, who founded the Carthusian monastery at Meyria in 1116; and Jean-Baptiste Vianney (1786–1859), parish priest at Ars.

The Diocese of Belley, in the Middle Ages, had no less than eight Carthusian monasteries. In the 17th century, it saw the foundation of the Joséphistes, a religious congregation founded by Jacques Crétenet (1606–67), a layman and surgeon who became a priest after the death of his wife. It was also the site of the foundation of the teaching order of the Sisters of St. Charles, founded by Charles Demia of Bourg (1636–89). Three teaching orders were founded in the first half of the 19th century: the Brothers of the Society of the Cross of Jesus; the Brothers of the Holy Family of Belley, and the Sisters of Saint Joseph of Bourg. In 1858 the idea of a Trappist monastery in the Dombes district, which had been discussed for some years, was taken in hand by the newly appointed bishop, Pierre-Henri Gérault de Langalerie (1857–1871); Trappist monks finally occupied the still-unfinished monastery near the village of Le Plantay (45 km northwest of Lyon, on the road to Bourg) in October 1863.

Cardinal Louis Aleman (1390–1450) was a native of the Diocese of Belley, as was Sister Rosalie (1787–1856), noted in the history of modern Parisian charities. Pierre-Louis-Marie Chanel, missionary to the Pacific, was born at Cuet near Bourg.

== Bishops of Belley ==
Louis Duchesne warns that, until the 10th century, the lists of bishops are faulty and many names are without other documentary evidence.

=== To 1000 ===
- Audax
- Tarniscus
- Migetius
- Vincent (552–567)
- Evrould
- Claudius (I)
- Felix (585–589)
- Aquilinus (614)
- Florentinus (c. 650)
- Hypodimius
- Ramnatius(Pracmatius)
- Bertere
- Ansemundus (c. 722)
- Hippolytus (c. 762-772)
- Gondoal
- Agisle
- Euloge
- Adorepert
- Ermonbert
- Rodoger
- Rhitfroy
- Étienne (I) (c. 790)
- Ringuin
- Sigold
- Adabaldus (886–899)
- Étienne II v.900
- Elisachar (c. 915–927)
- Isaac
- Hieronymus (c. 932)
- Hérice
- Didier
- Herdulphe 985
- Eudes (I) (995–1003)

=== 1000–1300 ===
...

- Aymon (c.1032–1055)
- Gauceran (c. 1070)
- Ponce I 1091–1116
- Amicon v.1118–1121
- Ponce de Balmey (c. 1124–1129)
- Berlion (c. 1134)
- Bernard de Portes (1134–1140)
- Guillaume (I) (1141–1160)
- Ponce de Thoire (c. 1162)
- Anthelme (1163–1178)
- Renaud 1178–1184
- Artaldus 1188–1190
- Eudes II 1190
- Bernard II 1198–1207
- Benoit de Langiis (c. 1208)
- Bernard de Thoire-Villars 1211–1212
- Boniface de Thoire-Villars 1213
- Jean de Rotoire
- Pierre de Saint-Cassin
- Boniface de Savoie, O.Carth. (1232–1240), Bishop-elect, Administrator
- Bernard IV 1244
- Pierre II 1244–1248
- Thomas de Thorimbert 1250
- Jean de Plaisance 1255–1269
- Bernard V v.1272
- Berlion D'Amisin v.1280–1282
- Guillaume
- Pierre de La Baume (1287–after 1298)

=== 1300–1500 ===
- (c. 1308) : Jean de La Baume
- (c. 1308/1309) : Thomas (II)
- (1325–1348?) : Jacques de Saint-André
- (1349–1355) : Amédeus d'Amesin
- (1356–1370?) : Guillaume de Martel
- (1370–1373) : Edouard de Savoie
- (1374–1394) : Nicolas de Bignes
- (1394–1395) : Aimo, Administrator (Avignon Obedience)
- (1395–1421) : Rodolphe de Bonnet (Avignon Obedience)
- (1422–1427) : Antonius Clementis, O.F.M.
- (1430–1437) : Guillaume Didier
- (1438–1460?) : Perceval de La Baume

(1439?) : [Aimeric Segaud ]

- (1444–1458)] : [Pierre de Bolomier, schismatic
- (1460–1462) : Guillaume de Varax
- (1462–1507) : Jean de Varax

=== 1500–1800 ===
- (1508–1534) : Claude de Estavayer, O.Cist.
- (1535–1538) : Philippe de La Chambre, O.S.B.
- (1538–1575) : Antoine de La Chambre
- (1575–1604) : Jean-Godefroi Ginod
- (1608–1629) : Jean-Pierre Camus
- (1629–1663) : Jean de Passelaigne
- (1663–1677) : Jean-Albert Belin
- (1678–1705) : Pierre du Laurens, O.S.B.
- (1705–1712) : François Madot
- (1712–1745) : Jean du Doucet
- (1745–1751) : Jean-Antoine Tinseau
- (1751–1790); Gabriel Cortois de Quincey

=== French Constitutional Church (schismatic) ===
- Jean-Baptiste Royer 1791–1793, constitutional bishop

=== 1800-Present ===
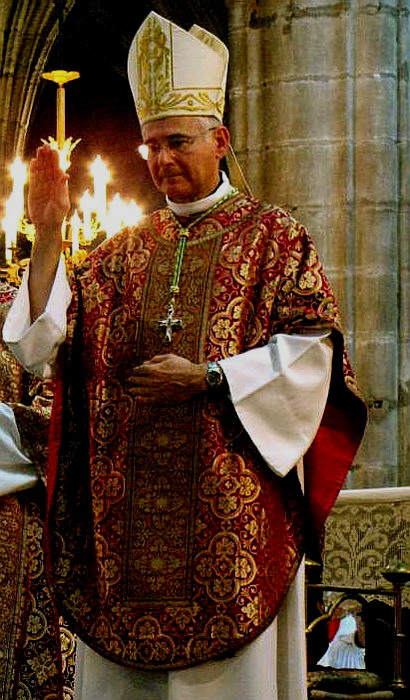
Bishop Pascal Roland

- (1823–1852) : Alexande-Raymond Devie
- (1852–1857) : Georges-Claude-Louis-Pie Chalandon
- (1857–1871) : Pierre-Henri Gérault de Langalerie
- (1871–1875) : François-Marie-Benjamin Richard de la Vergne
- (1875–1880) : Jean-Joseph Marchal
- (1880–1887) : Pierre-Jean-Joseph Soubiranne
- (1887–1906) : Louis-Henri-Joseph Luçon
- (1906–1910) : François-Auguste Labeuche
- (1910–1929) : Adolph Manier
- (1929–1934) : Virgile-Joseph Béguin
- (1935–1954) : Amédée-Marie-Alexis Maisonobe
- (1955–1975) : René-Fernand-Eugène Fourrey
- (1975–1986) : René-Alexandre Dupanloup
- (1987–2012) : Guy-Marie Bagnard
- (since 15 June 2012) : Pascal Roland

== See also ==
- Belley
- Bugey
- Catholic Church in France

== Bibliography ==
=== Reference works ===
- Gams, Pius Bonifatius (1873). Series episcoporum Ecclesiae catholicae: quotquot innotuerunt a beato Petro apostolo. Ratisbon: Typis et Sumptibus Georgii Josephi Manz. (Use with caution; obsolete)
- Eubel, Conradus, ed. (1913). Hierarchia catholica, Tomus 1 (second ed.). Münster: Libreria Regensbergiana. (in Latin)
- Eubel, Conradus, ed. (1914). Hierarchia catholica, Tomus 2 (second ed.). Münster: Libreria Regensbergiana. (in Latin)
- Eubel, Conradus; Gulik, Guilelmus, eds. (1923). Hierarchia catholica, Tomus 3 (second ed.). Münster: Libreria Regensbergiana.
- Gauchat, Patritius (Patrice) (1935). Hierarchia catholica IV (1592-1667). Münster: Libraria Regensbergiana.
- Ritzler, Remigius; Sefrin, Pirminus (1952). Hierarchia catholica medii et recentis aevi V (1667-1730). Patavii: Messagero di S. Antonio.
- Ritzler, Remigius; Sefrin, Pirminus (1958). Hierarchia catholica medii et recentis aevi VI (1730-1799). Patavii: Messagero di S. Antonio.
- Ritzler, Remigius; Sefrin, Pirminus (1968). Hierarchia Catholica medii et recentioris aevi sive summorum pontificum, S. R. E. cardinalium, ecclesiarum antistitum series... A pontificatu Pii PP. VII (1800) usque ad pontificatum Gregorii PP. XVI (1846) (in Latin). Vol. VII. Monasterii: Libr. Regensburgiana.
- Ritzler, Remigius; Sefrin, Pirminus (1978). Hierarchia catholica Medii et recentioris aevi... A Pontificatu PII PP. IX (1846) usque ad Pontificatum Leonis PP. XIII (1903) (in Latin). Vol. VIII. Il Messaggero di S. Antonio.
- Pięta, Zenon (2002). Hierarchia catholica medii et recentioris aevi... A pontificatu Pii PP. X (1903) usque ad pontificatum Benedictii PP. XV (1922) (in Latin). Vol. IX. Padua: Messagero di San Antonio. ISBN 978-88-250-1000-8.

=== Studies ===
- Alloing, Louis (1938). Le diocèse de Belley. Histoire religieuse des pays de l'Ain. (in French). Belley: A. Chaduc 1938.
- Cattin, François (1867). Mémoires pour servir à l'histoire ecclésiastique des diocèses de Lyon et de Belley depuis la constitution civile du clergé jusqu'au concordat. (in French). Lyom: P.N. Josserand 1867.
- Duchesne, Louis (1915). Fastes episcopaux de l'ancienne Gaule. Vol. III: Les provinces du Nord et de l'Est. (in French). Paris: A. Fontemoing, 1915.
- Du Tems, Hugues (1774). Le clergé de France, ou tableau historique et chronologique des archevêques, évêques, abbés, abbesses et chefs des chapitres principaux du royaume, depuis la fondation des églises jusqu'à nos jours (in French). Vol. 2. Paris: Delalain. pp. 161–176.
- Guichenon, Samuel (1650). Histoire de Bresse et de Bugey. (in French). Lyon: Huguetan & Raudaud 1650.
- Hauréau, Barthelemy (1860). Gallia christiana: in provincias ecclesiaticas distributa. (in Latin). Vol. 15. Paris: Firmin Didot, 1860. pp. 601-658; Instrumenta, pp. 305-358.
- Jean, Armand (1891). Les évêques et les archevêques de France depuis 1682 jusqu'à 1801 (in French). Paris: A. Picard. pp. 459–467.
- Le Duc, Philibert (1879). Histoire de la révolution dans l'Ain: Du 5 mai 1789 au 14 juillet 1790. (in French). Volume 1. Bourg-en-Bresse: Francisque Martin-Bottier 1879. Volume 2 (1880).
- Pisani, Paul (1907). Répertoire biographique de l'épiscopat constitutionnel (1791-1802) (in French). Paris: A. Picard et fils.

==== External links ====
- (in French) Old Official website
- Goyau, Georges. "Belley." The Catholic Encyclopedia. Vol. 2. New York: Robert Appleton Company, 1907. Retrieved: 9 February 2025.
