= Guy-Marie Bagnard =

Former French Roman Catholic Bishop

- Bishop Emeritus of Belley–Ars
- Church: Catholic Church
- Diocese: Diocese of Belley–Ars
- In office: 8 July 1987 – 15 June 2012
- Predecessor: René-Alexandre Dupanloup
- Successor: Pascal Roland

Orders
- Ordination: 29 June 1965 by Lucien-Sidroine Lebrun
- Consecration: 4 October 1987 by Albert Decourtray

Personal details
- Born: 14 April 1937 (age 89) Montceau-les-Mines, Saône-et-Loire, France

Monsignor Guy-Marie Bagnard, born Guy Claude Bagnard (born 14 April 1937), is a former French Roman Catholic Bishop of Belley-Ars, from 16 July 1987 (date of his nomination) to 15 June 2012 (date of resignation).

== History ==
Guy Bagnard was born in Montceau-les-Mines, France. He studied at the little seminary of Rimont, at the academic Seminary of Lyon (with the Catholic University of Lyon), at the Catholic Institute of Paris, and finally, at the Sorbonne University. He graduated in Theology and in Philosophy (D.E.A., in the French academic system). He was ordained to the priesthood on 29 June 1965. Named bishop on 16 July 1987, he was consecrated on 4 October in the same year, by Cardinal Albert Decourtray.

Recently, Guy Bagnard published Le Curé d'Ars, Portrait d'un Pasteur, a book which speaks about the life, the spirituality and the teaching of John Vianney.

== Sources ==
- Catholic Hierarchy: Guy Bagnard
