= Lac d'Ambléon =

Lake in Ain, France

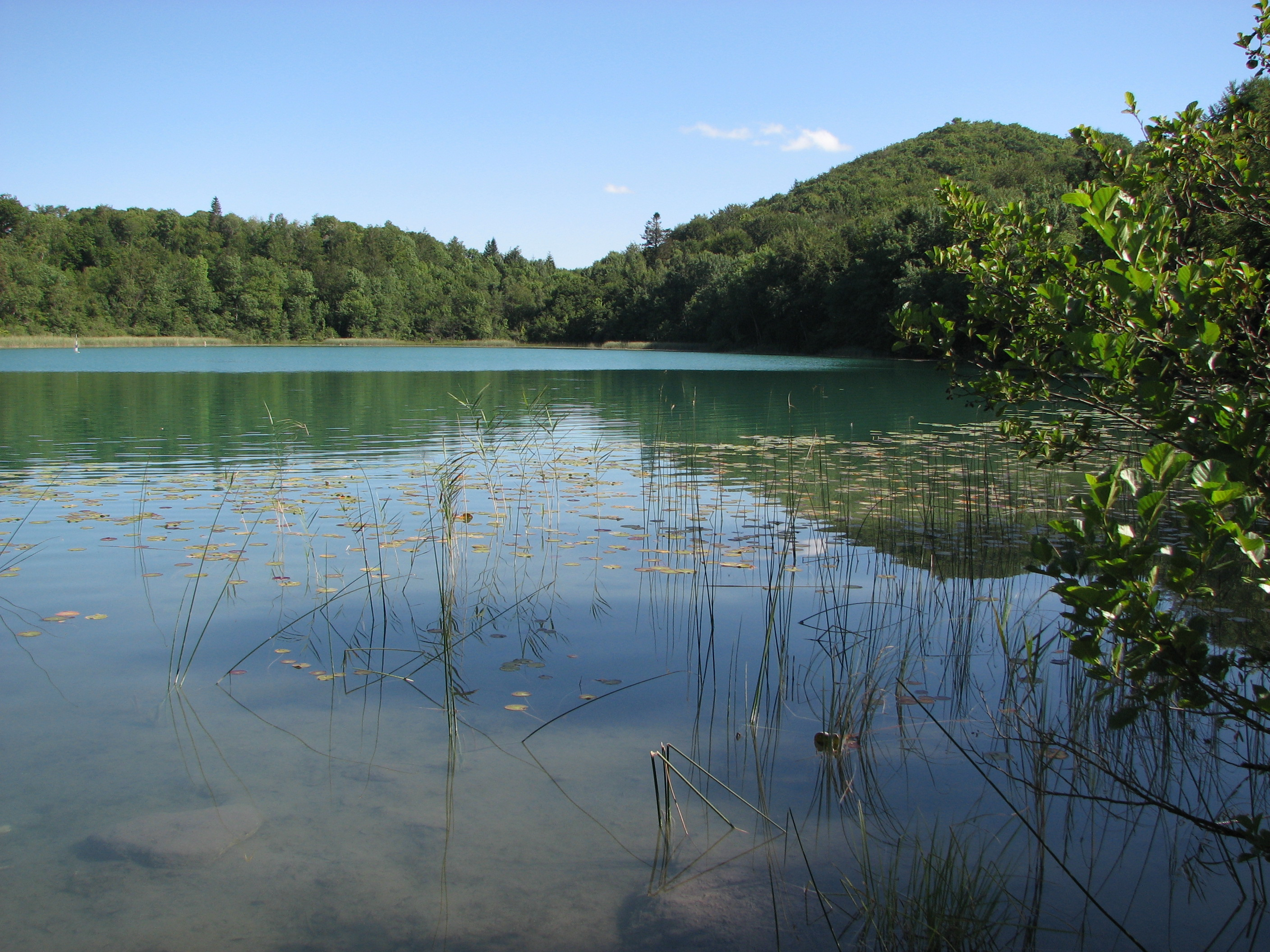

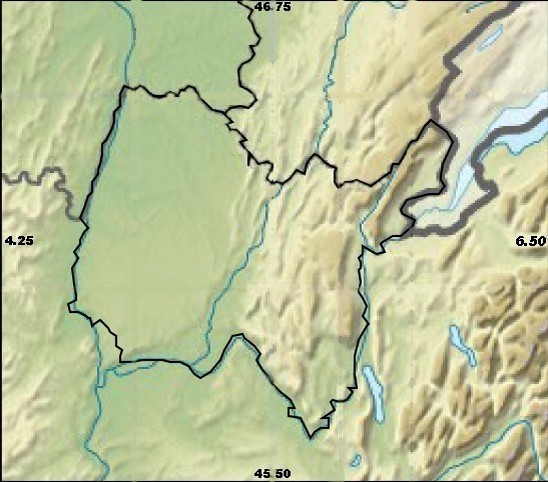
- Location within Ain
- Location: Ambléon, Ain
- Coordinates: 45°45′9″N 5°35′4″E
- Basin countries: France
- Surface area: 5.58 ha (13.8 acres)
- Max. depth: 10 m (33 ft)
- Surface elevation: 712 m (2,336 ft)

The Lac d'Ambléon (French pronunciation: [lak dɑ̃bleɔ̃]; "Lake of Ambléon") is a lake at Ambléon in the Ain department of France.
