= Jean-Marie Bottequin =

Belgian photographer and mime

Jean-Marie Albert Bottequin (born 29 April 1941, in Ghent) is a Belgian photographer, photojournalist, photo artist, and mime.

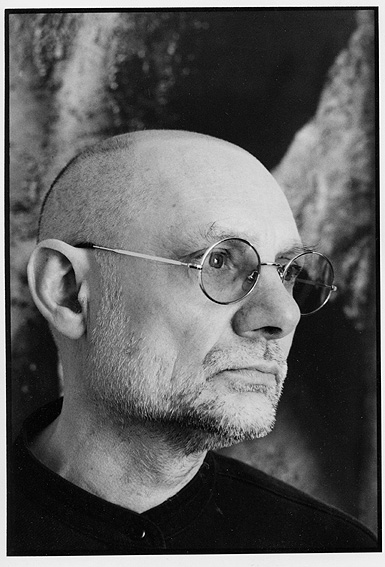
Jean-Marie Bottequin

== Early life and early career ==
Jean-Marie Bottequin is the son of Wallonian Prof Dr Armand Bottequin (professor for philosophy, theatrical science and Romance languages) and his Flemish wife, nurse and social worker, Odile Maenhout. His father's first marriage produced the sons Jacques and Pierre; the marriage with Odile Maenhout produced Jean-Marie Albert, Guy Antoine and Monique.

Following his high school graduation (baccalauréat), in 1957, Bottequin went on to study classical theater at the "Ecole des Hautes Etudes". In 1959, he was accepted to study Romance studies, educational studies and art education at Ghent University; in 1960, he decided to study painting and art education with renowned Belgian artist, Octave Landuyt at the ‘'Normalschool voor plastische Kunsten'’ in Ghent. Since 1962, Bottequin has been working as a free-lance photographer, photo artist, and self-taught artist.

In 1968, Bottequin created his first social reportages for Quick magazine, following which he became the personal photographer and reporter with IOS, Investors Overseas Services, Geneva – Munich. In 1970, Bottequin decided to also work as a free-lance photo journalist. From 1972 to 1981, aside from his free-lance commitments, he went on to become a member of the dramaturgy of the Bayerische Staatsschauspiel Munich, and consequently its personal photographer. From 1975 to 1985, he was a lecturer at the ‘'Lehrinstitut für Grafikdesign'‘ U5 Academy (now ‘'Akademie in der Einsteinstraße'‘).

== Personal life ==
Bottequin's first marriage to fellow Belgian Monique Kesteman produced the children Caroline and Michel. His second marriage to American–Belgian actress, voice talent, translator, book author and poet Marietta Meade produced the children Ezra, Avital and Ayalah.

Jean-Marie Bottequin speaks French, Dutch, German, and English.

Bottequin has been living and working in Munich, Germany since 1968.

== Scope of work ==
- Photo design, portraiture, commercial and industrial photography
- Theater and stage photography: Bayerisches Staatstheater (Bavarian State Theater), Munich, Germany; Bayerische Staatsoper (Bavarian State Opera), Munich; Bayreuther Festspiele; Württembergisches Staatstheater; Vereinigte Bühnen Wien, Vienna, Austria; Stuttgart Ballet; Hamburg Opera; Burgtheater Wien, Vienna, Austria; etc.
- Ballet photography: Stuttgart Ballet, Germany; Hamburg State Ballet, Germany; Koninklijk Ballet van Vlaanderen, Belgium.
- Automotive photography: In 1984 BMW commissioned Bottequin to photograph their celebrated photo series of BMW old timers (for which he won the Award of Excellence in 1988).
- Photo journalist for leading German magazines and glossies (e.g., Stern, Der Spiegel, Lui, Playboy, Form Magazin, Phototechnik und Design, Le Photographe, M Magazin, BMW Magazin, Freundin, Bunte), as well as European trade press.
- Social reportages
- (Movie and theater) Stills photography
- Travel photography (e.g., Turkey, France, United States, Germany, Italy, Spain, Bulgaria, Algeria, Canary Islands, India) for Stern, Quick, Ambiente, GEO, Der Spiegel, Lui (Philipachi Verlag Paris), Country and many other magazines
- Industrial and Fine Art Photography
- Architectural photography
- Reprography of paintings and sculpture photography
- Art Director (for catalogs, brochures and illustrations/layout, e.g., Classic Cars / BMW AG; Residenztheater Munich; Public Relations Office and Cultural Affairs Department of the City of Munich; European Patent Office, Munich; BMW AG, as well as numerous brochures pertaining to cultural events)

== Exhibits and collections ==
Bottequin has been internationally exhibited (individual and group exhibits) since 1965.

His oeuvre is an integral part of the following museums:

- Musée des Beaux Arts, Charlerloi, Belgium
- Musee de la Photographie, Charleroi, Belgium
- Collection of the State of Belgium
- National Theater Ghent, Belgium
- Photo Museum Munich
- European Patent Office, Munich
- Neue Sammlung (New Collection Museum), Munich
- BMW Museum, Munich
- Theater Museum, Munich
- Masonic Museum, Bayreuth
- Maison des Métiers d'Art de la Ville de Pézénas, France

== Books ==
Bottequin was published in the following books:

- "L'art, le Style et l'Auto", Musée de l'Art Moderne de la Ville de Paris, 1985
- "Die 7 Jahre des 7 – Die Entwicklung des großen BMW", Steinhaus Verlag, 1986
- "Design Process Auto", Neue Sammlung München, 1987
- "Der Ring", Bayreuth 1976–1980, Edition Robert Laffont, Paris 1980
- "Der Ring", Bayreuth 1988–1992, Europäische Verlagsanstalt, 1992
- "Art Collection European Patent Office", 1998
- "Ingmar Bergman Archive", Taschen Verlag 2008
- "Shylock", George Tabori, Andrea Welker, 1980
- "Theater, Zirkus, Varieté", vwi Verlag, Herrsching 1980
- "Die Liebe nach der Jagd...", Verlag ETC München 1979
- "König Ludwig II", Ullstein Langen Müller Verlag, München 1985
- "Die Freimaurer", Marcel Valmy, Callwey Verlag, 1990

== International clients ==
Among Bottequin's most famous clients is the automotive manufacturer BMW.

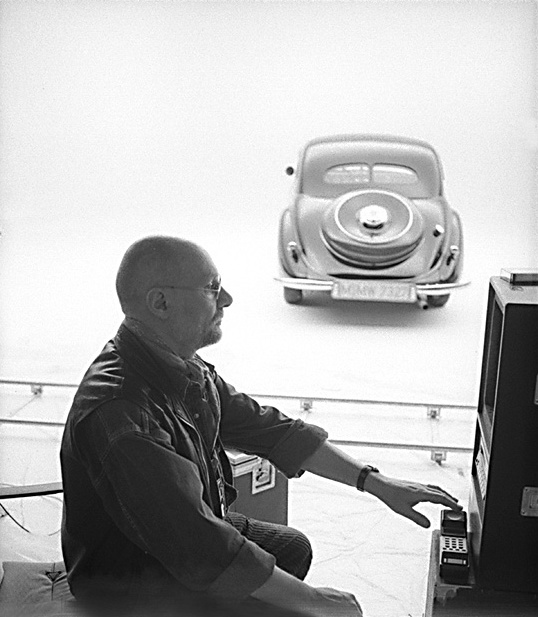
Jean-Marie Bottequin photographing BMW old timers, 1990

== Awards ==
- In 1967 Bottequin receives the ‘'Preis der belgischen Kritik'‘ (Award of the Belgian Critique) for his extraordinary black&white photography.
- In 1981 he is the recipient of the ‘'Sonderpreis der Triennale der Photographie'‘ (Special Award of the Triennale of Photography) in Fribourg, Switzerland.
- In 1988 he is the recipient of the ‘'Award of Excellence'’ in Chicago, United States.

== Advisory activity ==
Bottequin also acted as an advisor to the European Council and for UNESCO.

== Photographic seminars / workshops ==
Having founded IPS (International Photographic Seminars: Photographic seminars for professional and amateur photographers), Bottequin has been facilitating fine art photographic seminars since 1980. In addition, he gives public lectures on visual perception and active vision.

== Filmography (documentaries / a selection) ==
- "Cobra Gruppe bei Kindern", film on experimental education, commissioned by UNESCO und Ghent University, 1960, 30 min, 16 mm
- "Sanne Sannes – Photographer in Holland", Belgian (Flemish) TV (BRT), Ghent, 1967, 20 min, 16 mm
- "Photographieworkshop – eine Selbstinszenierung", commissioned by Fotomagazin, München, 1987, 17 min, Beta SP
- "Donni Buffalo Dog and Ursula Hanes – Two Sculptors in Tuscany", commissioned by the Musée du Nouveau Monde, La Rochelle, France, 1988, 30 min, Beta SP
- "Metamorphoses", automotive design of the 20th century, commissioned by BMW AG, Munich, 1993, 9 min, 16 mm; presentation at the International Design Exhibit in Paris
- "Art in Brazil", commissioned by the European Patent Office (EPA), Munich 1995, 25 min, Beta SP
- "Cristine Barroso – A Portrait", commissioned by the European Patent Office (EPA), Munich, 1996, 29 min, Beta SP

== Mime ==
Bottequin is a student of the French mimes, Étienne Decroux and Marcel Marceau.

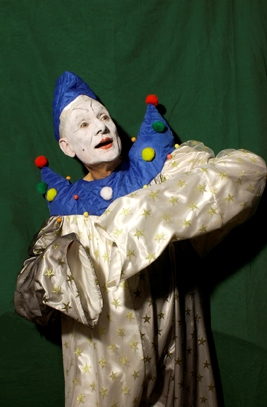
Jean-Marie Bottequin
