= Belley Cathedral =

Roman Catholic cathedral in Belley, Ain, France

Coordinates: 45°45′27″N 5°41′21″E

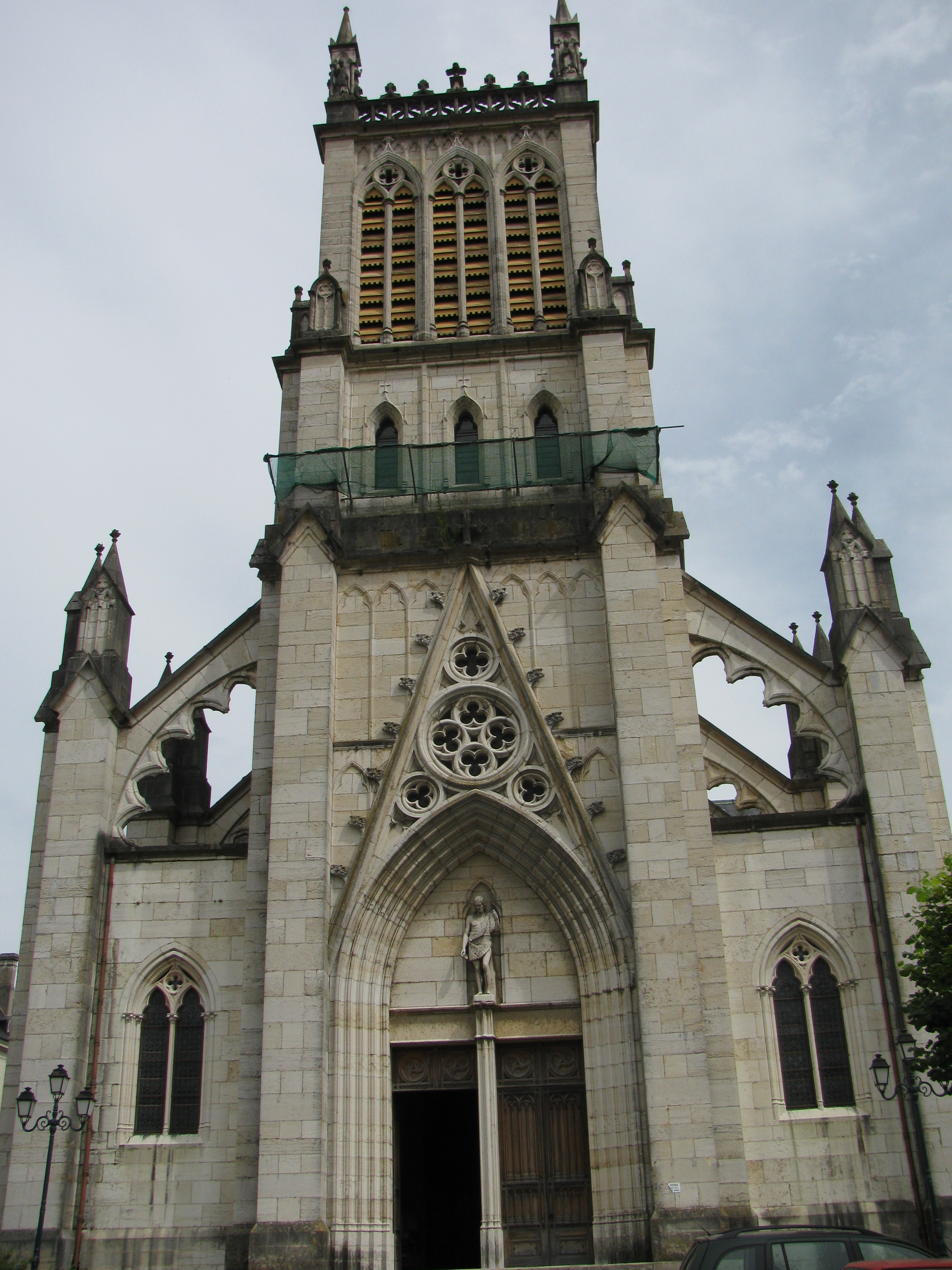
Belley Cathedral

Belley Cathedral (French: Cathédrale Saint-Jean de Belley) is a Roman Catholic cathedral, dedicated to Saint John the Baptist, and a national monument of France, located in the town of Belley, Ain.

It is the seat of Bishop of Belley–Ars.

It contains organs by Cavaillé-Coll.
