= Philippe de la Chambre =

French Benedictine monk, abbot and cardinal

Philippe de La Chambre OSB
- Cardinal-Bishop of Frascati
- Church: Catholic Church
- Diocese: Suburbicarian Diocese of Frascati
- In office: 24 September 1543 – 21 February 1550
- Predecessor: Marino Grimani
- Successor: Gian Pietro Carafa
- Other post: Administrator of Quimper (1546-1550)
- Previous posts: Cardinal-Priest of Santa Maria in Trastevere (1542-1543); Cardinal-Priest of Santa Prassede (1541-1542); Cardinal-Priest of Santi Silvestro e Martino ai Monti (1533-1541); Administrator of Belley (1535-1538)

Orders
- Created cardinal: 7 November 1533 by Pope Clement VII

Personal details
- Born: c. 1490 Duchy of Savoy, Holy Roman Empire
- Died: 21 February 1550 (aged 59–60) Rome, Papal States

Philippe de La Chambre (c. 1490 – 1550) was a French Benedictine monk and Abbot, and Cardinal.

== Family ==
His father was Louis de la Chambre, vicomte de Maurienne. His mother (Louis' second wife) was Anne de la Tour, daughter of Bertrand de la Tour d' Auvergne, Comte de Boulogne; she was the widow of Alexander Stuart, Duke of Albany, son of King James II of Scotland. He had a full brother, Jean Comte de la Chambre, and a half-sister, Françoise, who married Gabriel de Seyssel, Seigneur d'Aix.

== Abbot of Corbie ==
Dom Philippe, brother of the Comte de la Chambre of Savoy, a monk of Cluny, was elected abbot of Corbie on 4 May 1523, on the authority of Pope Clement VII, and he took possession on 14 November. At the same time the Archbishop of Reims, Robert de Lénoncourt, appointed a monk to the position of abbot. The monk resigned his rights to the Cardinal de Bourbon. Dom Philippe was willing to exchange Corbie with the Cardinal for the abbey of S. Amand, but the Pope refused to sanction the transaction on 9 December. On 27 April 1524, Philippe resigned and the Cardinal took possession by procurator, over the resistance of the monks of Corbie. Nonetheless the Cardinal solemnly entered Corbie on 6 October 1524. Philippe sued and won his case on 10 October 1528. He was given the abbatial blessing in Paris by the Bishop of Terouanne, and took possession of Corbie by proxy on 5 November 1528; he took possession in person on 5 December.

== Cardinal ==
In a Consistory on 7 November 1533 at Marseille, Philippe de la Chambre was created a Cardinal-priest by Pope Clement VII. He was one of four French churchmen who were elevated during the Pope's visit to France for the marriage of his niece to the son of King Francis I: (Jean Le Veneur, Odet de Coligny, Claude de Givry). This creation was a balance to the creation of thirteen cardinals at Bologna in 1530–1533, many of whom were subjects of the Emperor Charles V. On 10 November he was assigned the titulus of San Martino ai Monti. He was transferred to the titulus of Santa Prassede on 23 March 1541, and to Santa Maria in Trastevere on 15 February 1542.

Cardinal de la Chambre took part in the Conclave of 1534, which followed the death of Pope Clement VII who died on 25 September 1534. The Conclave opened on 11 October, and reached a decision on 11 October without any balloting. Cardinal Alessandro Farnese, the Dean of the College of Cardinals, was elected by "inspiration", and his election was duly recorded by the Masters of Ceremonies. Nonetheless, next morning a written ballot was taken, and Farnese was elected unanimously. De la Chambre's active participation was minimal.

The Cardinal was Apostolic Administrator of the diocese of Belley from 8 January 1535 until 24 May 1538, when he resigned in favor of his nephew, Antoine de la Chambre, who required a dispensation because he was below the canonical minimum age for being a bishop.

Cardinal de la Chambre was promoted Bishop of Frascati (Tusculum) on 24 September 1543, in succession to Cardinal Marino de Grimanis, who had been elevated to Bishop of Porto.

On 19 July 1546 the Cardinal de Boulogne was named apostolic administrator of the diocese of Quimper, which he held until his death in 1550. He was succeeded as Administrator by Cardinal Nicolas Caetani de Sermoneta, who held the diocese until 1660, when François de la Tour was appointed bishop.

=== Conclave of 1549-1550 ===
Pope Paul III died suddenly on 10 November 1549. The Novendiales (nine days of mourning) should have begun on 12 November, but the beginning was delayed until the 19th; they concluded on 28 November. The French cardinals had asked for extra time for their electors to arrive, and circumstances worked to give them the time. The Conclave to elect Pope Paul's successor was finally locked up in the evening of 30 November, but the first scrutiny (vote) did not take place until 4 December. The leaders in the ballot were Reginald Pole, Juan Álvarez de Toledo, OP, and Francesco Sfondrato. The influence of Charles V was much in evidence. But on 12 December five French cardinals appeared: Guise, du Bellay, Vendome, Chastillon and Tournon. Cardinal de Guise immediately took charge and plunged into negotiations, especially with Cardinal Farnese, who held the balance between the Imperialists and the French. On 18 December the leaders in the scrutiny were: Pole, Carafa, Giovanni Morone, and Marcello Cervini. On 29 December Cardinals Georges d'Amboise and Philippe de la Chambre finally entered Conclave. On 14 January Cardinal Louis de Bourbon-Vendôme finally appeared, but Cardinal Philippe de la Chambre had left the Conclave due to illness. On 15 January Cardinal Morone's votes reached 26 votes, but he could not attract any additional votes; his candidacy was at an end. On 17 January there were 13 votes for Morone, 21 for Pole and 22 for Carafa. Carafa and Pole were excluding each other, each having enough votes to prevent the other from reaching the canonically necessary two-thirds of the votes. Neither would be pope. In the evening of 7/8 February 1550 the cardinals finally settled on Cardinal Giovanni Maria Ciocchi del Monte, the least objectionable of the surviving candidates. Philippe de la Chambre was back in the Conclave in time to cast his vote for del Monte, who chose the throne name Julius III.

== Death ==
Cardinal Philippe de la Chambre died in Rome on 21 February 1550, having resigned Corbie to his nephew Sebastien de la Chambre. He was interred in the church of Santissima Trinità dei Monte.

=== Misconceptions ===
It is often repeated in the older literature that Philippe de la Chambre was Bishop of Boulogne. There was no bishopric of Boulogne in his lifetime. Boulogne was part of the diocese of Therouanne. Therouanne was destroyed in the wars of religion, and the diocese was restructured and renamed the Diocese of Boulogne in 1566. Philippe de la Chambre was not Bishop of Therouanne (Morinensis) either.

It is also stated that Philippe's brother Jean was Duke of Albany. Their mother had been Duchess of Albany in her first marriage, to Alexander Stewart, Duke of Albany, but he had died in a tournament in 1485. John Stewart, their only son, became Duke of Albany. Philippe de la Chambre was the product of his mother's second marriage, and was the half-brother of John Stewart, but Philippe also had a full brother from his mother's second marriage named John (Jean), who was Comte de la Chambre.
