= Schang Hutter =

Swiss sculptor (1934–2021)

- Born: Jean Albert Hutter; 11 August 1934; Solothurn, Switzerland
- Died: 14 June 2021 (aged 86); Solothurn, Switzerland
- Occupation: Sculptor

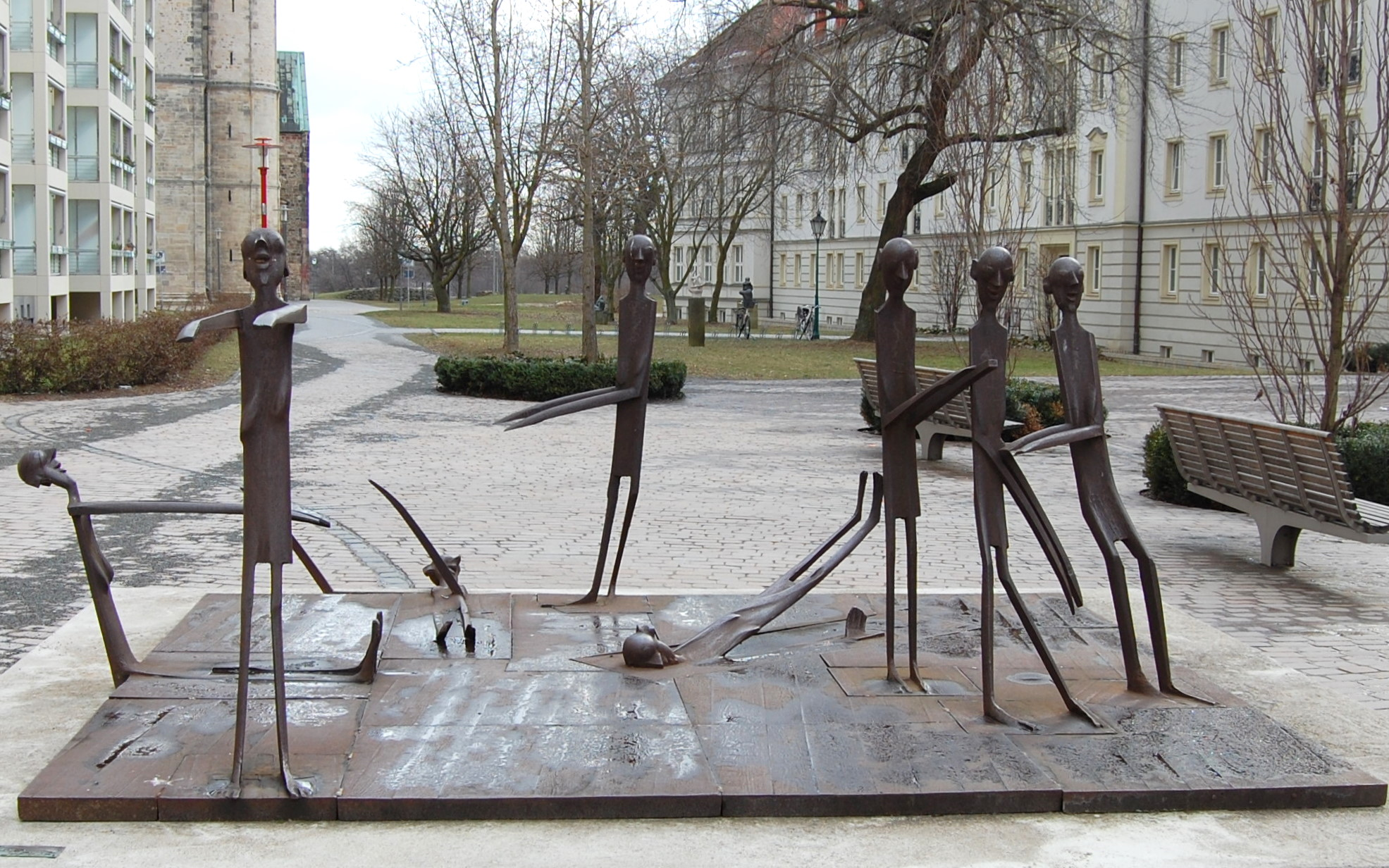
Vertschaupet II (1979), Magdeburg

Jean Albert Hutter (11 August 1934 – 14 June 2021), known as Schang Hutter, was a Swiss figurative sculptor. His humanist work explored vulnerability, isolation and political violence through elongated, puppet-like figures. He received a prize at the Florence Biennale in 1975 and the Art Prize of the Canton of Solothurn in 1986. In 1998, the placement and removal of his sculpture Shoah outside the Federal Palace in Bern became the subject of a major public debate.

== Biography ==
Schang Hutter was born in Solothurn on 11 August 1934. His father, Jean Hutter, worked as both a stonemason and a sculptor. Between 1950 and 1954, Hutter trained as a stonemason in his family’s business while studying at the Kunstgewerbeschule in Bern. He later attended the Academy of Fine Arts in Munich from 1954 to 1961. There he studied sculpture under Josef Henselmann before returning to Solothurn in 1961. Hutter received federal art scholarships in 1958, 1960 and 1974, and was awarded a prize at the Florence Biennale in 1975.

Hutter married Anje Lehmann in 1957 and Regula Nyffenegger in 1970. In 1969–1970, he spent six months in Warsaw on a Polish state scholarship, where he learned lithography. He joined the Social Democratic Party in 1971. During the 1980s, he lived first in Hamburg and then in Berlin, before moving to Hessigkofen. He received the Art Prize of the Canton of Solothurn in 1986. From 1988 to 1989, he was a visiting professor at the Academy of Fine Arts in Munich.

From 1991, Hutter was the partner of Ruth Guggisberg. In the same year, he stood for the Council of States in the canton of Solothurn, representing the Social Democratic Party. From 1999, he lived in Genoa and Derendingen, maintaining studios in both places. He died in Solothurn on 14 June 2021.

== Work ==
Hutter was considered one of Switzerland’s leading figurative sculptors. His work reflected a humanist outlook. Human fragility was a persistent theme in Hutter’s art and was especially prominent in his large-scale sculptures. It often featured puppet-like figures whose silence and isolation represented responses to external pressures and events.

During his years in Munich, Hutter met fellow students and others whose lives had been shaped by war and imprisonment; these encounters had a lasting influence on his work. Wilhelm Lehmbruck and Alberto Giacometti were important influences on the development of his sculptural style. By the 1960s, his figures were typically narrow-bodied, with sharply pointed noses, arms held against the torso and thin legs. His figures often had greatly elongated limbs, which gave them a frail and defenceless appearance. Colour also carried symbolic meaning in his sculpture: he associated pink with vulnerability and red with his political convictions.

During the 1970s, Hutter adapted a copying lathe to make serial figures composed of cylindrical bodies and minimally modelled heads, which he assembled into upright groups and narrowing towers. Around the end of the decade, his work shifted from static compositions towards movement and gesture, notably in Vertschaupet and the Veitstänze series. The 1990s brought more abstract sculptural groups, while in the 2000s he returned to individual figures distinguished by gesturing hands. Alongside sculpture, Hutter worked in drawing and printmaking, and occasionally in painting.

His Dying Concentration Camp Prisoner (1964–1972), based on a photograph of an emaciated man who died while crawling towards Allied liberators, is considered an important memorial to concentration-camp victims.

On 28 February 1998, Hutter placed Shoah outside the Federal Palace in Bern during a sculpture project commemorating 200 years since the Helvetic Republic. The sculpture drew attention to decisions by Swiss politicians against admitting Jewish refugees from Germany during the Second World War. It was made of steel. It stood about three metres from the agreed site. It was subsequently taken away by the Freedom Party of Switzerland and left outside Hutter’s studio, leading to considerable public controversy.

== Legacy ==
Hutter’s work is represented in public collections including the Aargauer Kunsthaus, Kunstmuseum Olten and Kunstmuseum Solothurn. A major retrospective was held at the former Burgernziel tram depot in Bern in 2014 to mark Hutter’s 80th birthday. In 2024, Kunsthaus Grenchen marked the 90th anniversary of his birth with the exhibition Kunst und Krieg.

In 2025, Hutter’s son David, who administers his father’s estate, curated an exhibition in a former factory in Attiswil where Hutter had worked late in his career. The exhibition brought together sculptures, drawings, paintings and lithographs from the estate. Some works were transferred to a publicly accessible site in Langenthal, while others remained in Attiswil for storage or sale while a catalogue was being prepared.

== Gallery ==
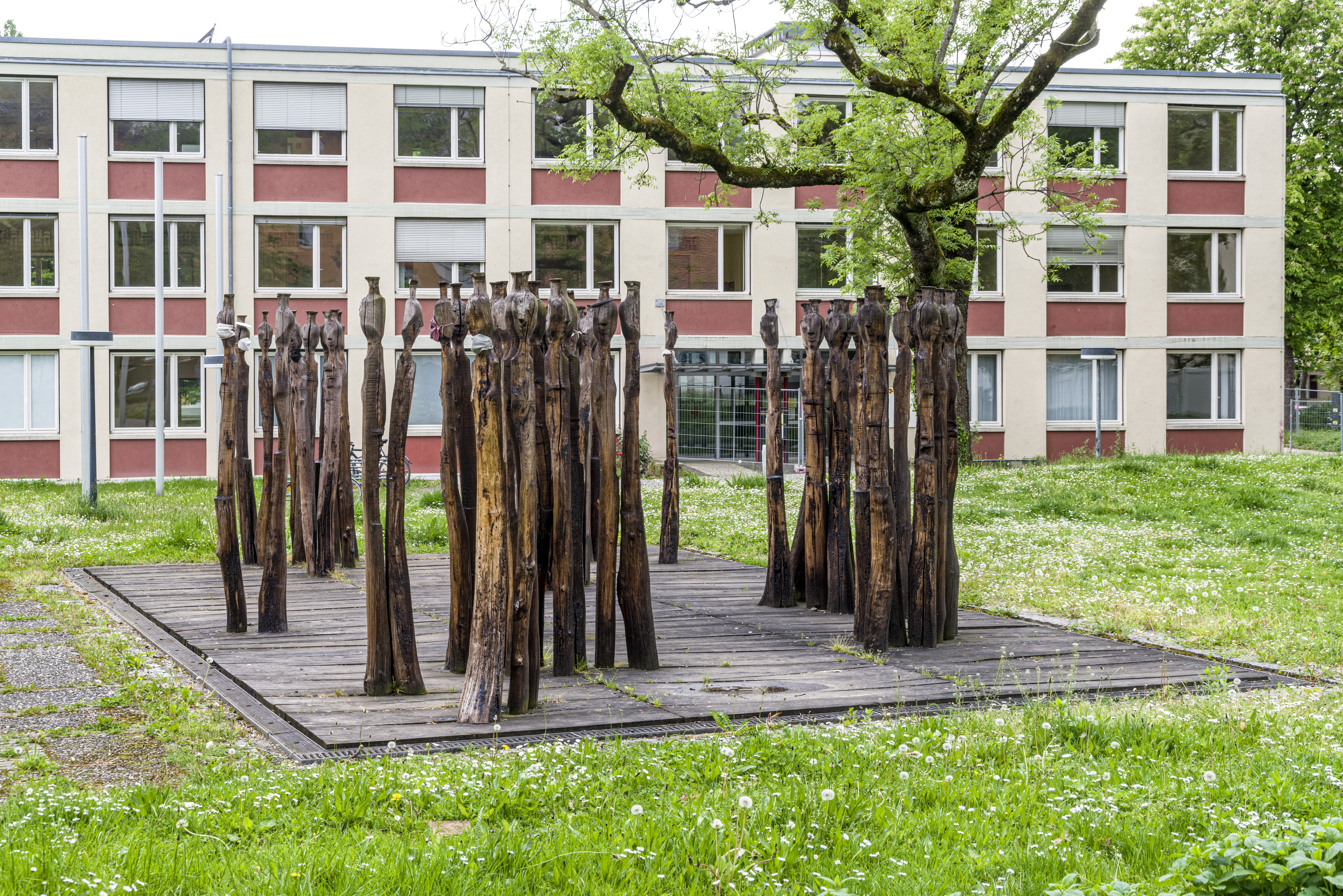
Gruppenfigur 70fach (1978), Freiburg im Breisgau

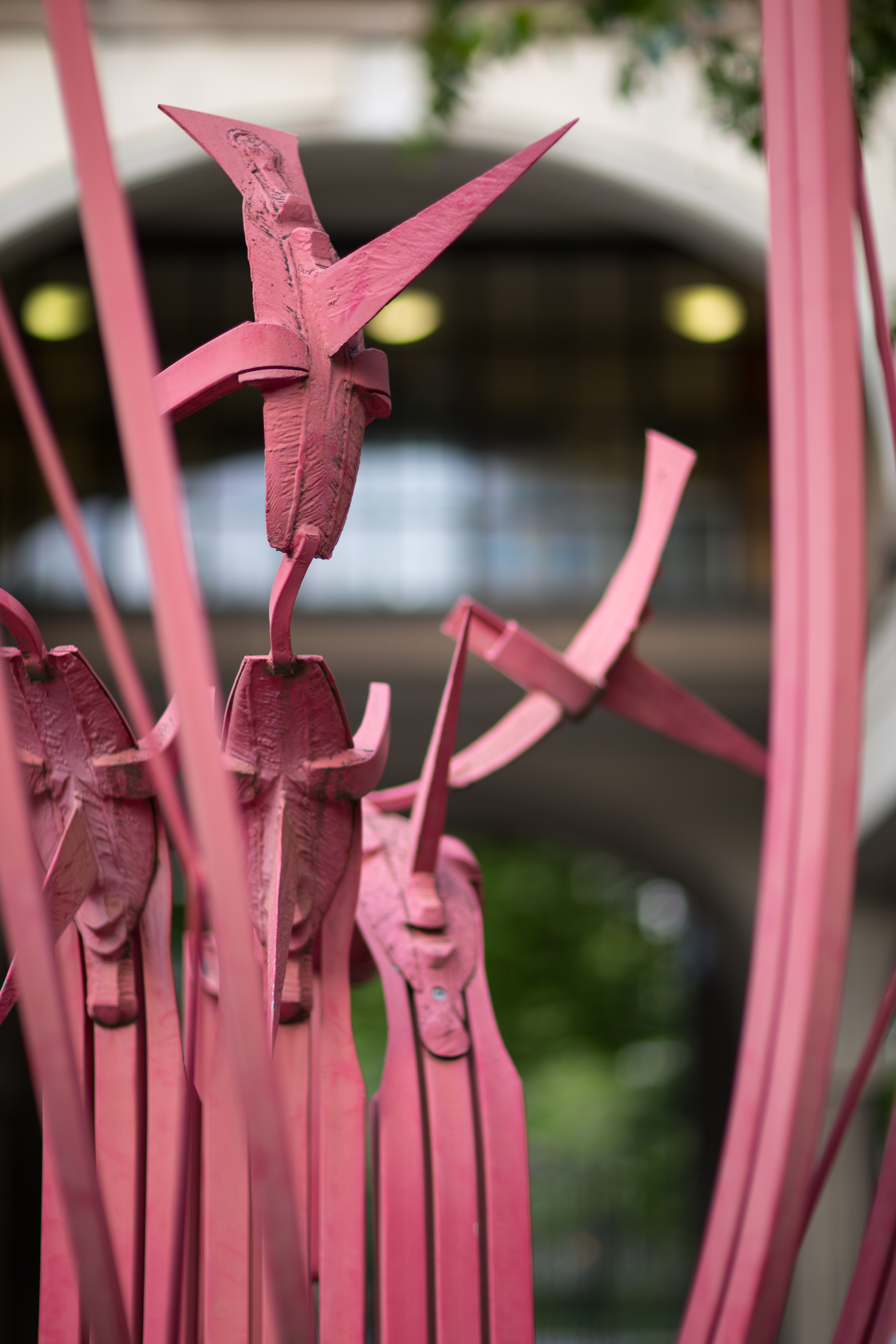
Veitstanz (1989), Hanover

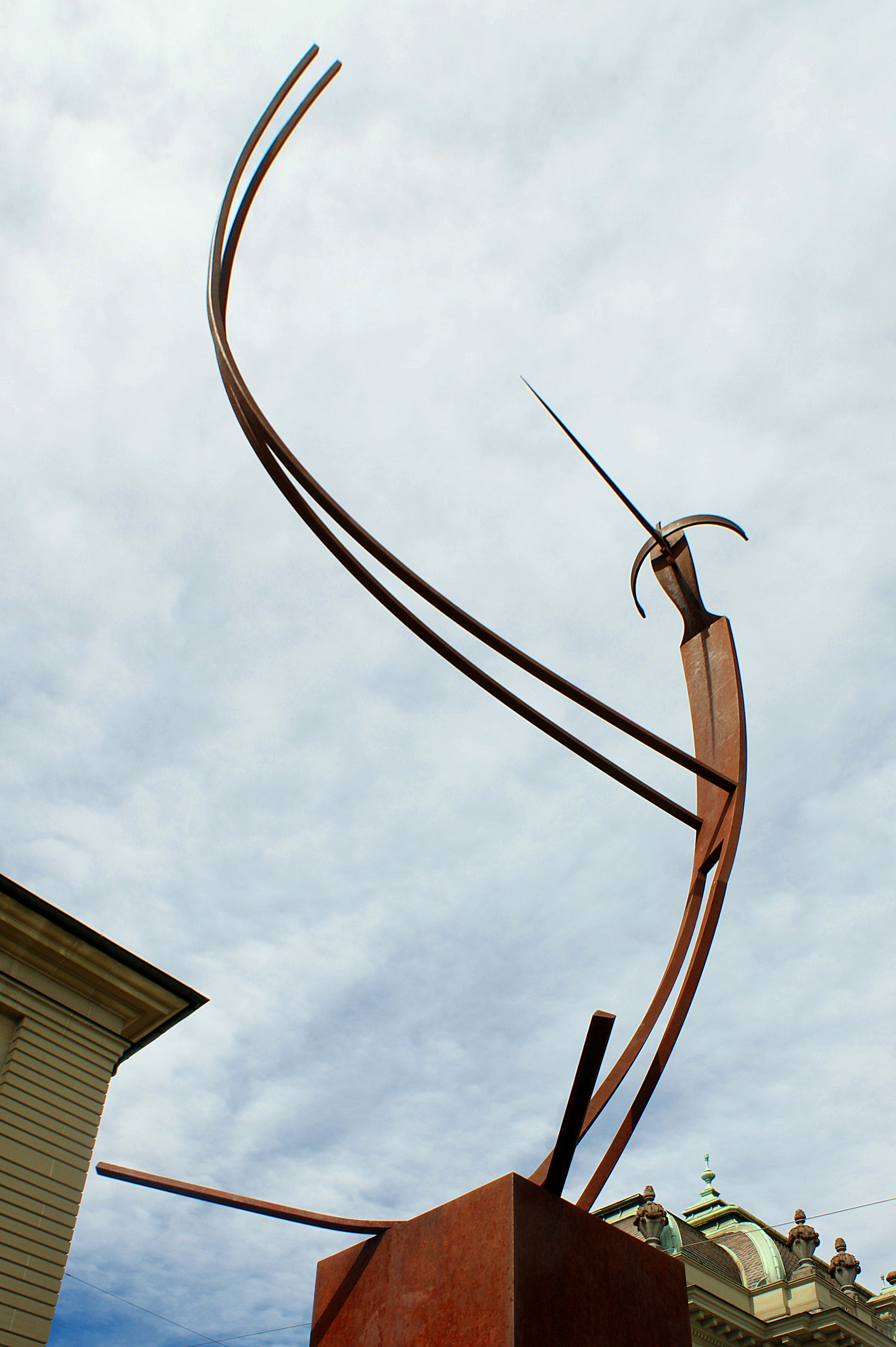
Der Verletzlichkeit Raum geben (1999), Bern
