= Albert Belin =

French writer and bishop

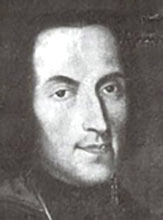
Albert Belin

Albert (Jean) Belin (born 1610 in Besançon, died 29 April 1677) was a bishop of Belley and French writer.

== Works ==
- Pierre philosophale (Paris, 1653)
- Talismans justifiés (Paris, 1653)
- Poudre de sympathie mystérieuse (Paris, 1653)
- Poudre de projection demontrée (Paris, 1653)
- Le voyage inconnu (Paris, 1653)
- Principes de ves convainquantes des vérités du Christianisme (Paris, 1666)
- Preuves convainquantes des verites du Christianisme (Paris, 1666)
- Emblèmes eucharistiques, ou octave du très S. Sacrement (1647, 1660)
- Les solides pensées de l'ame, pour la porter à son devoir (Paris, 1668)

He probably also published, as Alphonsus Belin, La vérité de la religion catholique et las fausseté de la religion prétendue réformée (Nevers, 1683).
