= Albert Frédéric Jean Galeer =

Albert Frédéric Jean Galeer (1810–1851) was a Swiss-born teacher and man of letters who took part in the Sonderbund War in 1847 and participated in the Baden-Palatinate uprising of 1849.
