= CUET =

CUET may refer to:

- Common University Entrance Test, in India
- Chittagong University of Engineering & Technology, in Bangladesh
