= Saint Roland =

French saint

Saint Roland was the third abbot of a Cistercian monastery founded in 1140 in Chézery, France, in what is now the Diocese of Belley-Ars.

According to local tradition, he was born in 1150 in England or Ireland. In 1186 he succeeded the Abbot Guillaume at Chézery. St. Roland died there around 1200. His feast day is on September 15.

Relics of St. Roland are housed in the altar of the parish church of Chézery. Prayers for St. Roland's intercession are said to be effective for curing eye, head and stomach ailments, and for alleviating drought.

A local legend has St. Roland encountering a thirsty reaper along the road to Lélex on a hot day. He offers the reaper a choice of wine or water. The reaper replies that wine is not made for the lips of the poor, and he is very poor. St. Roland strikes the ground with his walking stick, and up springs fresh water. Today the "Oratory of the Blessed Fountain" stands over the site. Locals will often comment: "If only the peasant had asked for wine."

The statue of Roland in Riga should however not be confused with a depiction of the saint, but is rather a symbol of the freedom of the city.

== Bibliography ==
- (in French) Chézery-Forens region
- (in French) Villorama
