= Quick (German magazine) =

German news magazine

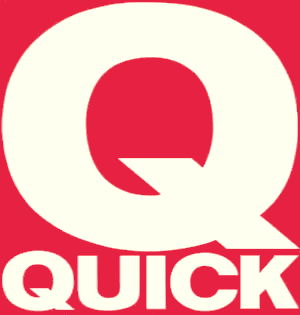
- Quick logo
- Categories: News magazine
- Frequency: Weekly
- First issue: 25 April 1948
- Final issue: 27 August 1992
- Company: Bauer Group
- Country: Germany
- Based in: MunichHamburg
- Language: German

Quick was a German-language weekly illustrated news magazine published from 25 April 1948 to 27 August 1992 in Hamburg, Germany. It was the first magazine published in Germany after the Second World War.

== History and profile ==
The first issue of Quick appeared on 25 April 1948 and had an initial print run of 110,000 copies. The magazine was launched by the Bauer Media Group and was published on a weekly basis. Its headquarters was in Munich. Later it had its headquarters in Hamburg.

Traudl Junge, Adolf Hitler's secretary, for many years worked as a secretary for the chief editorial staff of Quick.

At one time one of the most important magazines in its class, it reached a peak circulation of 1.7 million copies in 1960. As attitudes towards sex changed, the magazine tried to adapt, including more coverage of sex and crime in the 1980s. This was not a success and advertising revenue fell by 50% and circulation to 700,000 between 1990 and the closing of the magazine in 1992. It ceased publication on 27 August 1992.
