= Belley =

Commune in Auvergne-Rhône-Alpes, France

Belley Bèlê (Arpitan)
- Subprefecture and commune
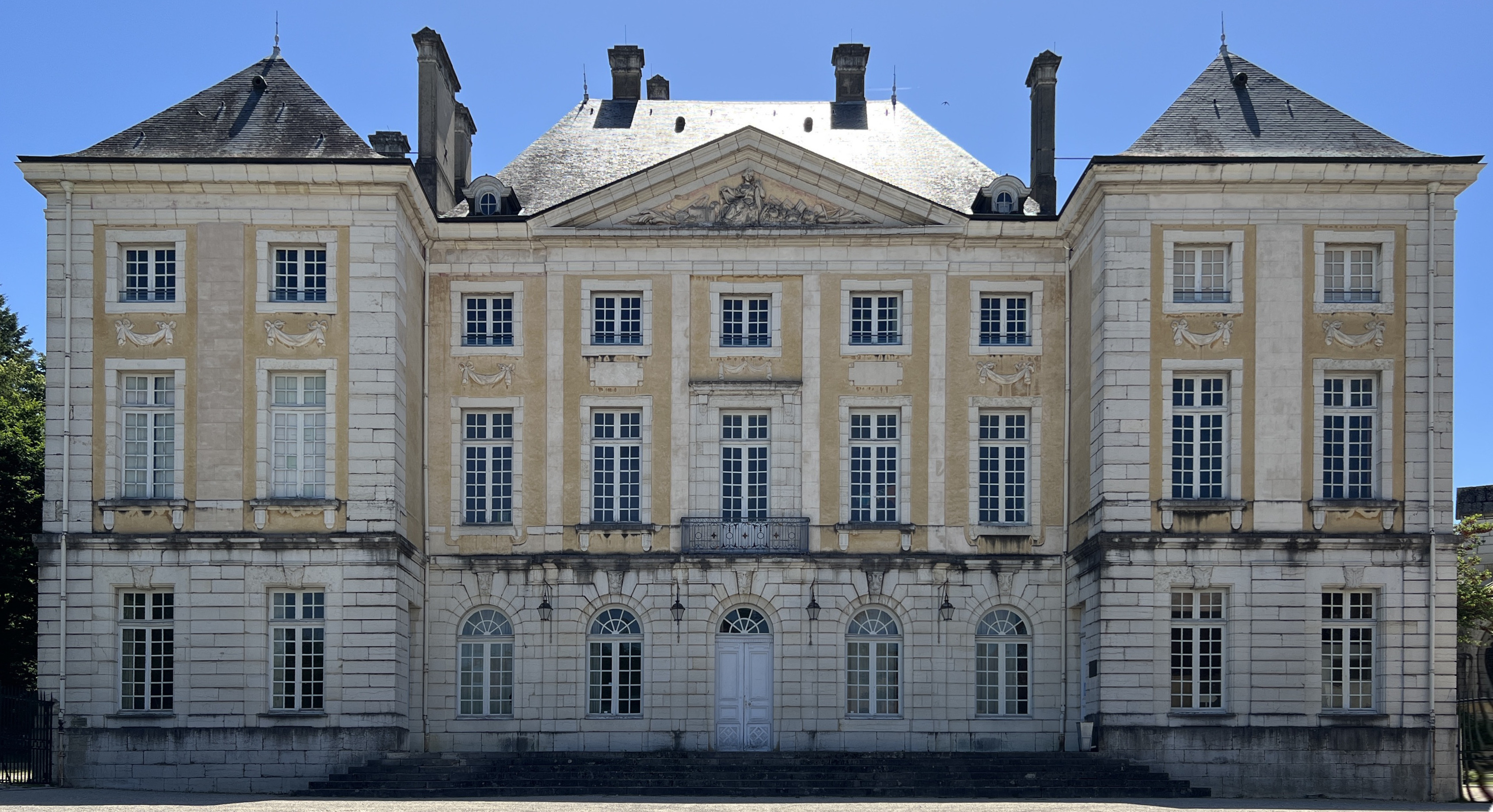
- Palais épiscopal de Belley

- Coat of arms
- Location of Belley
- Location within France Location within Auvergne-Rhône-Alpes
- Coordinates: 45°46′00″N 5°41′00″E
- Country: France
- Region: Auvergne-Rhône-Alpes
- Department: Ain
- Arrondissement: Belley
- Canton: Belley
- Intercommunality: Bugey Sud

Government
  - Mayor (2026–32): Dimitri Lahuerta
- Area^{1}: 22.42 km^{2} (8.66 sq mi)
- Elevation: 306 m (1,004 ft)
- Highest elevation: 392 m (1,286 ft)
- Lowest elevation: 220 m (720 ft)
- Population (2023): 9,388
  - Density: 418.7/km^{2} (1,085/sq mi)
- Demonym: Belleysans
- Time zone: UTC+01:00 (CET)
  - Summer (DST): UTC+02:00 (CEST)
- INSEE/Postal code: 01034 /01300
- Website: www.belley.fr
- ^{1} French Land Register data, which excludes lakes, ponds, glaciers > 1 km^{2} (0.386 sq mi or 247 acres) and river estuaries.

Belley (French pronunciation: [bəlɛ]; Arpitan: Bèlê) is a subprefecture of the Ain department in the Auvergne-Rhône-Alpes region, France. It is the capital of the historical region of Bugey, although not its largest city, which is Oyonnax, to the north.

== History ==
Belley is of Roman origin; in the 5th century it became an episcopal see. It was the capital of the province of Bugey, which was a dependency of Savoy till 1601, when it was ceded to France. In 1385 the town was almost entirely destroyed by an act of arson, but was sequentially rebuilt by the dukes of Savoy, who surrounded it with ramparts of which little is left.

Belley was the birthplace of the epicure Jean-Anthelme Brillat-Savarin.

=== Ecclesiastical history ===
Belley was the seat of the Bishop of Belley and is the location of Belley Cathedral. Belley is the home region of St Peter Chanel, the famous 19th-century Marist missionary martyr and protomartyr of Oceania.

== Demographics ==
Historical population
| Year | Pop. | ±% p.a. |
|---|---|---|
| 1968 | 7,049 | — |
| 1975 | 7,583 | +1.05% |
| 1982 | 7,981 | +0.73% |
| 1990 | 7,807 | −0.28% |
| 1999 | 8,004 | +0.28% |
| 2007 | 8,665 | +1.00% |
| 2012 | 8,870 | +0.47% |
| 2017 | 9,103 | +0.52% |
| 2023 | 9,388 | +0.52% |
Source: INSEE

== Climate ==
Belley features an oceanic climate (Cfb) but with strong continental influences due to its far inland position and its proximity to the Jura Mountains under the Köppen system. Both temperatures above 30 °C (86 °F) and air frosts are common.

Climate data for Belley (1991−2020 normals, extremes 2001−present)
| Month | Jan | Feb | Mar | Apr | May | Jun | Jul | Aug | Sep | Oct | Nov | Dec | Year |
|---|---|---|---|---|---|---|---|---|---|---|---|---|---|
| Record high °C (°F) | 18.8 (65.8) | 21.0 (69.8) | 24.5 (76.1) | 29.2 (84.6) | 32.6 (90.7) | 37.3 (99.1) | 38.6 (101.5) | 40.1 (104.2) | 32.8 (91.0) | 26.6 (79.9) | 22.6 (72.7) | 17.2 (63.0) | 40.1 (104.2) |
| Mean daily maximum °C (°F) | 5.7 (42.3) | 8.0 (46.4) | 13.1 (55.6) | 17.9 (64.2) | 21.0 (69.8) | 25.9 (78.6) | 28.1 (82.6) | 27.2 (81.0) | 22.9 (73.2) | 17.3 (63.1) | 10.5 (50.9) | 6.2 (43.2) | 17.0 (62.6) |
| Daily mean °C (°F) | 2.7 (36.9) | 4.1 (39.4) | 8.2 (46.8) | 12.3 (54.1) | 15.5 (59.9) | 19.9 (67.8) | 21.6 (70.9) | 21.0 (69.8) | 17.3 (63.1) | 12.8 (55.0) | 7.1 (44.8) | 3.2 (37.8) | 12.1 (53.8) |
| Mean daily minimum °C (°F) | −0.3 (31.5) | 0.1 (32.2) | 3.2 (37.8) | 6.6 (43.9) | 9.9 (49.8) | 13.8 (56.8) | 15.2 (59.4) | 14.7 (58.5) | 11.6 (52.9) | 8.3 (46.9) | 3.8 (38.8) | 0.3 (32.5) | 7.3 (45.1) |
| Record low °C (°F) | −11.3 (11.7) | −13.4 (7.9) | −11.0 (12.2) | −2.3 (27.9) | 0.9 (33.6) | 4.0 (39.2) | 7.7 (45.9) | 7.6 (45.7) | 2.6 (36.7) | −2.2 (28.0) | −6.6 (20.1) | −12.5 (9.5) | −13.4 (7.9) |
| Average precipitation mm (inches) | 103.6 (4.08) | 76.5 (3.01) | 89.6 (3.53) | 76.0 (2.99) | 100.7 (3.96) | 86.5 (3.41) | 79.4 (3.13) | 93.4 (3.68) | 63.3 (2.49) | 118.3 (4.66) | 111.2 (4.38) | 101.3 (3.99) | 1,099.8 (43.30) |
| Average precipitation days (≥ 1.0 mm) | 10.9 | 8.6 | 10.6 | 8.3 | 12.1 | 9.0 | 7.8 | 9.0 | 7.2 | 10.2 | 10.3 | 11.0 | 114.8 |
Source: Météo-France

== Economy ==
The town is famed for its cheese, la Tome de Belley, also known as Chevret or still "Le pavé d'Affinois". It is also at the centre of the Bugey wine region. It is also home to a sizeable Volvo production unit producing compact excavators, Comatel and Ciat.

== Personalities ==
- Le Tanneur a historic French leather goods house was founded in 1898 by Charles Bonnardel and Francisque Bornex in Belley, Ain
- Gertrude Stein and Alice B. Toklas lived at Bilignin near Belley through much of WW2. Stein wrote 'Wars I have seen' as a diaristic account of that time. See also Two Lives: Gertrude and Alice, Janet Malcolm, c. 2007.
- French gastronome Jean Anthelme Brillat-Savarin was born and lived in Belley and served as its mayor for some time.
- French writer Andrée Martinerie (1917–1997) writer winner of the 1961 Prix des Libraires was born in Belley.

== See also ==
- Communes of the Ain department
