= MAfestival Brugge =

MA Festival
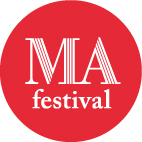
- MA Festival logo
- Genre: Early music
- Dates: Yearly in August
- Locations: Bruges, Belgium
- Organizer: MA Festival
- Website: https://mafestival.be/en/news

The MA Festival Brugge, short for the festival Musica Antiqua Bruges in Bruges, Belgium, is a festival of early music and historically informed performances, started in 1960. The program includes concerts, master classes, conferences, visits in the region, exhibitions, instrument market, and international competitions that concentrates in a three-year cycle on organ, harpsichord, pianoforte and other period instruments, vocals, and baroque ensembles. The specialised festival is part of the Festival of Flanders.

== History ==
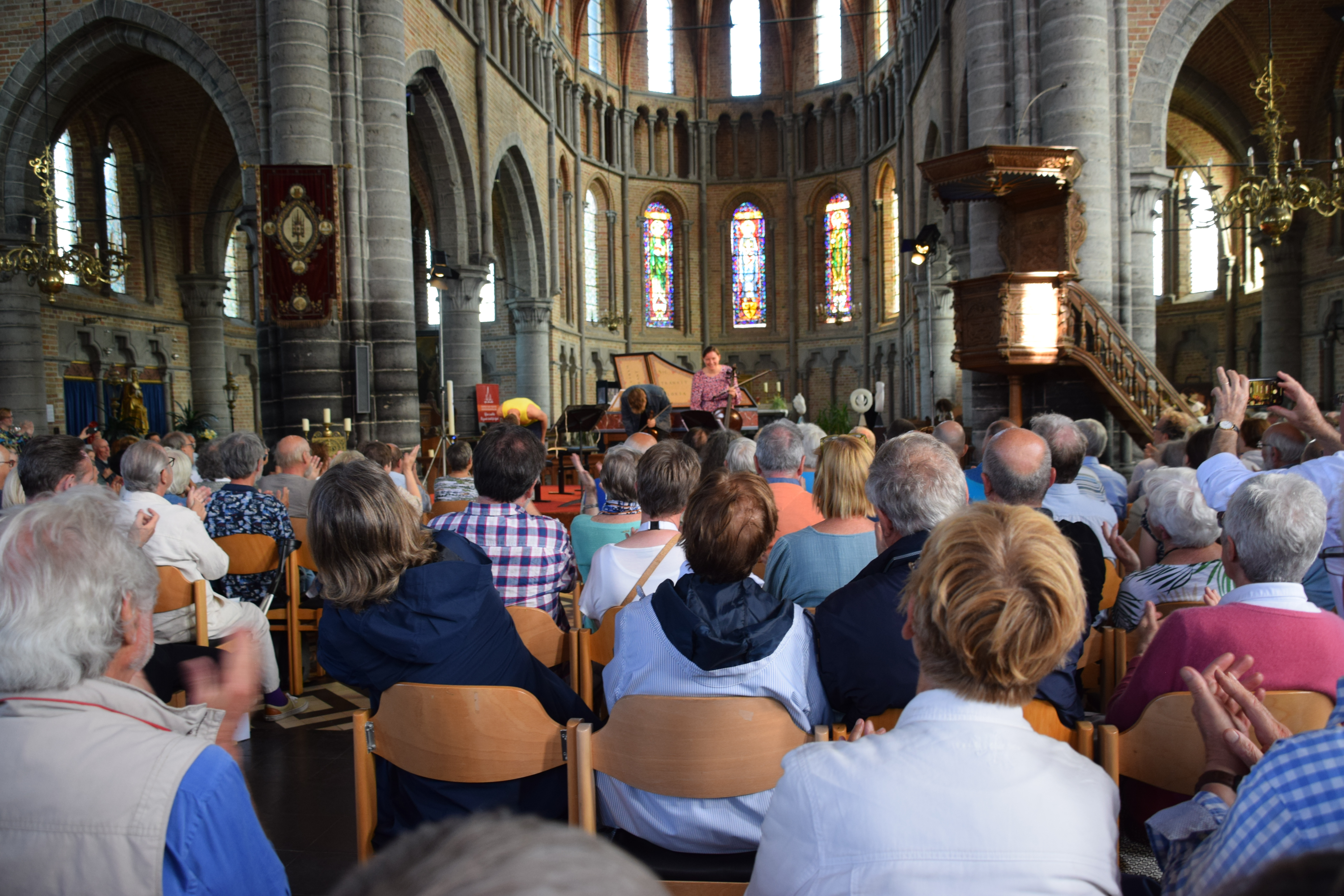
Performance in a church in Lissewege

The city of Bruges joined the Flanders Festival in 1960. In the early years, the emphasis was mainly on the biennial exhibitions of Flemish Primitives in European possession. Gradually, the idea grew, given the evolution of the Flanders Festival in almost exclusively a musical direction, to organize a musical part in Bruges as well. To achieve this, a non-profit organization was founded in 1962. Mayor Pierre Venamme and two aldermen were among the founders on behalf of the city, together with persons who mainly belonged to the music sector (Kamiel D'Hooghe, Jan Briers, Robrecht Dewitte, Herman Sabbe, Canon Paul François, Raymond Van Wassenhove). In 1963, 'Organ Days' were organized. The first official festival took place in 1964.

From that year and until 2004, the festival was led by co-founder and driving force Robrecht Dewitte.

The organizer called on specialists who, with their knowledge of the evolution in music performance, were of good advice. Among them are: Gustav Leonhardt, Kamiel D'Hooghe, prof. Marcel Boereboom, prof. Jozef Robijns, Pieter Enriessen and Johan Huys.

The management tasks were taken over after 2004 as follows:

• 2004-2005: Bart Demuyt;

• 2005-2007: Stefan Dewitte;

• 2007-2009: Tomas Bisschop and Hendrik Storme;

• 2009-2019: Tomas Bisschop;

The current directors are Tomas Bisschop (artistic director) and Goedele Bartholomeeusen (business director).

== Mission of the festival ==
From the start they wanted to show the highlights from the city's past and provide a meeting place for specialists, performers, instrument makers, educators, students, and music lovers.

The path had been prepared for this by Safford Cape, who had set the tone for its summer courses with Pro Musica Antiqua since 1961 in Bruges. From 1964 the organization of competitions was worked out in concrete terms within regularly successive three-yearly cycles. Immediately, the emphasis was also placed on these competitions, as the main opportunity to support the vibrancy and image of the festival and to introduce the ideas that the organizers were propagating to the younger generations.

Music making has been complemented by exhibitions and fairs, interpretation courses and master classes, forums, lectures, and guided visits to historic instruments in Flanders. Concert performances are focused on lesser-known music until about 1800.

== Competition ==
Ever since the first edition of this prestigious international competition, the MA Competition has established itself as a unique platform for training and professional integration and encounter of young promising talent. It actively supports the artistic process and some important values including equality, diversity and inclusion.

The MA Competition first took place in 1964 with a triennial competition for organ, followed in 1965 by a triennial competition for harpsichord and basso continuo and from 1983 also for pianoforte. In 1972 the competition was extended to include the recorder and the competition for ensembles was also started (which coincided with the organ competition from 2000). The program for baroque instruments became more and more extensive. Completed the list: traverso, baroque oboe, lute, cornetto, baroque violin and cello, viola de gamba ... Since 1984, singing has also been featured.

Due to the corona pandemic in 2020, the MA Competition did not take place for the first time since 1969. Thanks to a quick and efficient overhaul of the organization, the rest of the programming could continue online. Partly due to this crisis, in 2021 the organization of the festival was adapted to the situation and the first round of the competition takes place digitally. Starting this year, the competition will be a biennial event, alternating between keyboard instruments (harpsichord and pianoforte) and melodic instruments (traverso, recorder, baroque oboe, baroque violin, baroque cello and viola da gamba).

Since 2008, the winner of the first prize will, in addition to a cash prize, win the chance to be invited to a series of concerts taking place in Belgium and abroad, including a guaranteed place in the next edition of the MA Competition. In addition, since 2013, one of the candidates has the opportunity to record a CD with the internationally renowned Ricercar label.

=== International competition for organ and since 2000 for early music ensembles as well ===
1964

- Jury: Catherine Crozier, Albert de Klerk, Kamiel D'Hooghe, Paul François, Hans Klotz and the blind organist Gaston Litaize
- number of candidates: 30
- laureates: 1st prize: Niels Henrik Nielsen (Denmark) - 2nd prize: Rolf Stenholm (Sweden) - 3rd prize: Gerard Gillen (Ireland) - 4th prize: René Rakier (Netherlands) - 5th prize: Chris Dubois (Belgium)

1967

- Jury: Kamiel D'Hooghe, Wolfgang Auler, Norbert Dufourcq, Paul François, Piet Kee
- number of candidates: 24
- laureates: 1st prize: Günther Kaunzinger (Germany) - 2nd prize: Jack Hennigan (USA) - 3rd prize: Bengt Berg (Sweden) - 4th prize: Leo Krämer (Germany)

1970

- Jury: Michel Chapuis, Kamiel D'Hooghe, Paul François, Friedrich Högner, Peter Hurford
- number of candidates: 45
- laureates: 2nd prize: Lucie Madden (Canada) and Vladimir Ruso (Czechoslovakia) - 3rd prize: Helen Dugal (Canada) - 4th prize: M. Schmid (Switzerland)

1973

- Jury: Kamiel D'Hooghe, Ludwig Doerr, Bernard Lagacé, Lionel Rogg, David Pizarro, Gabriel Verschraegen
- number of candidates: 53
- laureates: 1st prize: Réjean Poirier (Canada) - 2nd prize: Dee Ann Crossley (US) - 3rd prize: Bram Beekman (Netherlands), Martin Lücker (Germany) and Bernhard Marx (Germany)

1976

- Jury: Xavier Darasse, Albert de Klerk, Ludwig Doerr, Bernard Lagacé, Pierre Segond, Gabriel Verschraegen, Paul François (president)
- number of candidates: 84
- laureates: 1st prize: Istvan Ella (Hungary) - 2nd prize: Christa Rakich (US) - 3rd prize: Alfred Halbartschlager (Austria) - 4th prize: Roman Summereder (Austria) - 5th prize: Wolfram Syré (Germany)

1979

- Jury: Nicholas Danby, Xavier Darasse, Ton Koopman, Bernard Lagacé, Michael Radulescu, Gabriel Verschraegen
- number of candidates: 80
- laureates: 1st prize: James David Christie (US) - 2nd prize: Michael Kapsner (Germany) - Karol Golebiowski (Poland) - 4th prize: Robert Bates (US) and Wolfgang Glüxam (Austria)

1982

- Jury: Robert Enerson, Odile Bailleux, Chris Dubois, Johan Huys, Ton Koopman, Michael Radulescu, Jean-Claude Zehnder
- number of candidates: organ: 64 - organ positive: 8
- laureates organ: 1st prize: Wolfgang Zerer (Germany) - 2nd prize: Guido Mayer (Austria) and Reitze Smits (Netherlands) - 3rd prize: Masaaki Suzuki (Japan) - 4th prize: Gilles Harlé (France)
- laureates organ positive: 2nd prize: Wolfgang Zerer (Germany) - 3rd prize: Geert Bierling (Netherlands) and John Finney (USA)

1985

- Jury: James David Christie, Xavier Darasse, Stanislas Deriemaeker, Johan Huys, Ton Koopman, Simon Preston, Michael Radulescu
- number of candidates: 85
- laureates: 2nd prize: Christoph Anselm Noll (Germany) - 3rd prize: Isolde Kittel (Germany) - 4th prize: Patrick Ayrton (Britain) and Markus Malin (Austria) - 5th prize: David Adams (Ireland) and Enrea Marcon (Italy)
- laureaat Bachprize: Michael Kapsner (Germany) - honorable mention: Geert Bierling (Netherlands)

1988

- Jury: James David Christie, Xavier Darasse, Johan Huys, Ton Koopman, Leo Krämer, Michael Radulescu
- number of candidates: 79
- laureates: 2nd prize: Bine Katrine Bryndorf (Denmark) and Gerhard Gnann (Germany) - 4th prize: N. Imaï (Japan)

1991

- Jury: James David Christie, Xavier Darasse, Johan Huys, Leo Krämer, Michael Radulescu, Luigi Ferdinando Tagliavini
- number of candidates: 45
- laureates: 1st prize: Bernhard Klapprott (Germany) - 3rd prize: Luca Antoniotti (Italy) and Junko Ito (Japan) - 4th prize: Junko Wada (Japan)

1994

- Jury: Jean Boyer, Dorthy de Rooij, Johan Huys, Enré Luy, Karl Maureen, Luigi Ferdinando Tagliavini
- number of candidates: solo: 58 - duo (organ positive): 28
- laureates organ: 1st prize: David Yearsley (USA) - 2nd prize: Luca Antoniotti (Italy) - 3rd prize: Roberto Menichetti (Italy) - 4th prize: Luca Scenali (Italy) and Enrea Vannucchi (Italy)
- laureates duo's: 1st prize: Antonio Galanti and Enrea Vannucchi (Italy) and Annette Richards (Britain) and David Yearsley (USA) - 2nd prize: Hadrien Jourdan (Switzerland) and Jean-Christophe Leclère (France) - 3rd prize: Christophe Körber and Christian Richter (Germany)

1997

- Jury: Jean Boyer, Dorthy de Rooij, Lorenzo Ghielmi, Johan Huys, Martin Lücker, Michael Radulescu
- number of candidates: organ: 38 - duo's (organ positive): 18
- laureates organ: 1st prize: Francis Jacob (France) - 2nd prize: Rie Hiroe (Japan) and Damien Simon (France) - 3rd prize: Wim Winters (Belgium)
- laureates duo's: 1st prize: Edita Keglerova and Iva Vedralova (Czech Republic) - 2nd prize: Olivier Fortin and Karoline Leblanc (Canada) - Sebastien Guillot and Pascal Dubreuil (France) - 3rd prize: Debora Villani and Maurizio Stefania (Italy)

2000

- Jury organ: Michel Bouvard, Bine Katrine Bryndorf, Johan Huys, Dorthy de Rooij, Enrea Marcon, Wolfgang Zerer
- Jury ensembles: Bine Katrine Bryndorf, Johan Huys, María Cristina Kiehr, Enrea Marcon, Philip Pickett, Agata Sapiecha
- number of candidates: organ: 45 - ensembles: 16
- laureates organ: 1st prize: Tobias Lindner (Germany) - 2nd prize: Frédéric Champion (France) and Erich Michael Türk (Roemenië) - 3rd prize: Hye-Sun Park (South-Korea) and Christian Schmitt (Germany)
- laureates ensembles: 1st prize: La Trulla de Bozes (Spain) - 2nd prize: La Calendola and La Fontaine Tokyo (Japan) - 3rd prize: Les Cornets Noirs (Germany)

2003

- Jury organ: Johannes Geffert, Johan Huys, Enrea Marcon, Joris Verdin, David Yearsley
- Jury ensembles: Florian Heyerick, Johan Huys, María Cristina Kiehr, Agata Sapiecha, Stevie Wishart
- number of candidates: organ: 49 - ensembles: 21
- laureates organ: 1st prize: Marketa Reindlova (Czech Republic) - 2nd prize: Maude Gratton (France) - 3rd prize: Benjamin Righetti (Switzerland) - 4th prize: Els Biesemans (Belgium) and Francesco Pedrini (Italy)
- laureates ensembles: 1st prize: L'Ornamento (Germany) - 2nd prize: Maude Gratton and Rossi Piceno (Internationaal) - 3rd prize: La Loge Olympique (France) and Ensemble Esperanto (Poland-Germany)

2006

- Jury organ: Michel Bouvard, Jean Ferrard, Johannes Geffert, Lorenzo Ghielmi, Johan Huys, David Yearsley
- Jury ensembles: Jan De Winne, Johan Huys, Linda Nicholson, Agata Sapiecha, Barbara Schlick
- number of candidates: organ: 45 - ensembles: 12
- laureates organ: 1st prize Wolfgang Kogert (Austria) - 2nd prize: Wouter Koelewijn (Netherlands) - 3rd prize: Paul Goussot (France) - 4th prize: Bart Jacobs (Belgium) - 5th prize: Krzysztof Pawlisz (Poland) -
- laureates ensembles: Baroque ensembles: 1st prize: Xacona - 2nd prize: Wooden Voices - ensembles Mozart: 1st prize: Duo Shichijo-Yamaguchi and Quatuor Fratres.

2009

- Jury organ: Nicolau de Figueiredo, Johannes Geffert, Lorenzo Ghielmi, Theo Jellema, Johan Huys
- Jury ensembles: Bruce Dickey, Dominique Visse, Johan Huys
- number of candidates: organ: 10 - ensembles: 14
- laureates organ:1st prize Ben Van Nespen (Belgium) - 2nd prize: Jean-Philippe Merckaert (Belgium) - 3rd prize: Simone Vebber (Italy) - Laureaat: Litz Aoki
- laureates ensembles: 1st prize: Ensemble Estampes of Les Timbres - 2nd prize ex aequo: Ensemble Diamanté and L'Art Du Bois

=== International competition for harpsichord, basso continuo and since 1983 also pianoforte ===
1965

- Jury: Gustav Leonhardt, Robert Veyron-Lacroix, Aimée Van de Wiele, Li Stadelmann.
- number of candidates: 25
- laureates: 2nd prize: Christiane Jaccottet (Switzerland), honorable mention: Roswitha Trimborn (Germany)

1968

- Jury: Gustav Leonhardt, Isolde Ahlgrimm, Thurston Dart, Robert Veyron-Lacroix, Charles Koenig
- number of candidates: 36
- laureates: 2nd prize: Martha Brickman (Canada) and Zsuzsa Pertis (Hungary) - 3rd prize: Anne Gallet (Switzerland) - 4th prize: Colin Tilney (Britain) - 5th prize: Johann Sonnleitner (Austria)
- certificates: Ton Koopman (Netherlands) - Scott Ross (USA) - Roswitha Trimborn (Germany)
- laureates basso-continuo: 1st prize: Ton Koopman (Netherlands) - 2nd prize: Colin Tilney (Britain)

1971

- Jury: Isolde Ahlgrimm, Kenneth Gilbert, Charles Koenig, Gustav Leonhardt, Raymond Schroyens, Colin Tilney, Robert Veyron-Lacroix
- number of candidates: 33
- laureates: 1st prize: Scott Ross (USA), 2nd prize: John Whitelaw (Canada), 3rd prize: Christopher Farr (Britain), 5th prize: Alexander Sung (Hong Kong)
- laureates basso continuo: 2nd prize: Christopher Farr (Britain)
- honorable mention: Christopher Hogwood (Britain)

1974

- Jury: Hedwig Bilgram, Christiane Jaccottet, Alan Curtis, Kenneth Gilbert, Gustav Leonhardt, Colin Tilney, Jozef Robijns
- number of candidates: 41
- laureates: 2nd prize: Henk Cuppers (Netherlands) - 3rd prize: Eric-Lynn Kelley (USA) and Martin Pearlman (USA) - 4th prize: Gordon Murray (Canada) - 5th prize: Larry Phillips (USA)

1977

- Jury: Isolde Ahlgrimm, Christiane Jaccottet, Johan Huys, Gustav Leonhardt, Herbert Tachezi, Colin Tilney, Jos Van Immerseel
- number of candidates: 64
- laureates: 2nd prize: Françoise Lengellé (France) - 4th prize: Michel Kiener (Switzerland) and Christopher Kite (Britain)

1980

- Jury: Kenneth Gilbert, Robert Kohnen, Gustav Leonhardt, Scott Ross, Johann Sonnleitner, Herbert Tachezi
- number of candidates: 82
- laureates harpsichord: 2nd prize: Glen Wilson (USA) - 3rd prize: Beatrice Berstel (France) and Charlotte Mattax (USA) - 4th prize: Malcolm Proud (Ireland) - 5th prize: Ketil Haugsen (Norway)
- laureates basso continuo: 2nd prize: Glen Wilson (USA) and Masaaki Suzuki (Japan)

1983

- Jury: Kenneth Gilbert, Christopher Hogwood, Johan Huys, Gustav Leonhardt, Trevor Pinnock, Johann Sonnleitner, Herbert Tachezi
- number of candidates: harpsichord: 61 - pianoforte: 7
- laureates harpsichord: 1st prize: Christophe Rousset (France) - 2nd prize: Pierre Hantaï (France) - 3rd prize: Kyoko Soejima (Japan) - 5th prize: Borbala Dobozy (Hungary)
- laureates pianoforte: 2nd prize: Linda Nicholson (Britain) and François Verry (France) - 3rd prize: David Mason (Britain)

1986

- Jury: Kenneth Gilbert, Johan Huys, Gustav Leonhardt, Scott Ross, Herbert Tachezi, Jos Van Immerseel
- number of candidates: harpsichord: 74 - pianoforte: 18
- laureates harpsichord: 2nd prize: Akiko Kuwagata (Japan) and Miyuki Takahashi (Japan) - 3rd prize: Ottavio Dantone (Italy) - 4th prize: Christine Whiffen (Britain) - 5th prize: Mayako Sone (Japan)
- laureates pianoforte: 1st prize: Geoffrey Lancaster (Australia) and Bart van Oort (Netherlands) - 2nd prize: Yoshiko Kojijma (Japan) - 3rd prize: Gianni Gambi (Italy)

1989

- Jury: Kenneth Gilbert, Johan Huys, Gustav Leonhardt, Johann Sonnleitner, Jos Van Immerseel, Glen Wilson
- number of candidates: harpsichord: 59 - pianoforte: 21
- laureates harpsichord: 1st prize: Nicholas Parle (Australia) - 3rd prize: Jovanka Marville (Switzerland) and Kenneth Weiss (USA)
- laureates pianoforte: 2nd prize: Wolfgang Brunner (Germany) - 4th prize: Theresa Bogard (USA) and Guido Mayer (Austria) - 5th prize: Junko Miyasaka (Japan)

1992

- Jury: Jesper Bøje Christensen, Stanley Hooglen, Johan Huys, Françoise Lengellé, Gustav Leonhardt, Gordon Murray, Johann Sonnleitner, Glen Wilson
- Number of candidates: harpsichord: 75 - pianoforte: 30
- laureates harpsichord: 2nd prize: Blenine Rannou (France) - 4th prize: Yves Rechsteiner (Switzerland)
- laureates pianoforte: 2nd prize: Andriy Kutasevych (Ukraine) and Henrike Seitz (Germany - 3rd prize: Natalja Solotych (Ukraine) - 4th prize: Carole Cerasi (Sweden)

1995

- Jury: Abraham Abreu, Jesper Bøje Christensen, Johan Huys, Geoffrey Lancaster, Gustav Leonhardt, Davitt Moroney, Gordon Murray, Ludger Rémy
- number of candidates: harpsichord: 103 - pianoforte: 26
- laureates harpsichord: 3rd prize: Roberto Menichetti (Italy) - 4th prize: Katrina Brown (Australia) and Giampietro Rosato (Italy)
- laureates pianoforte: 1st prize: Kikuko Ogura (Japan) - Florian Birsak (Austria) - 3rd prize: Arthur Schoonderwoerd (Netherlands) and Bart Van Sambeek (Netherlands)

1998

- Jury: Françoise Lengellé, Wolfgang Brunner, Jesper Bøje Christensen, Johan Huys, Gustav Leonhardt, Davitt Moroney, Ludger Rémy
- number of candidates: harpsichord: 99 - pianoforte: 29
- laureates harpsichord: 1st prize: Beatrice Martin - 2nd prize: Aapo Häkkinen (Finland) - 3rd prize: Christian Cuiller (France) - 4th prize: Michael Sponseller (USA)
- laureates pianoforte: Elena Privano-Karl (Germany) and Soo-Huyen Park (South-Korea)

2001

- Jury: harpsichord: Borbala Dobozy, Jesper Bøje Christensen, Johan Huys, Gustav Leonhardt, Davitt Moroney, Ludger Rémy, Christophe Rousset
- Jury pianoforte: Wolfgang Brunner, Johan Huys, Linda Nicholson, Ludger Rémy, Bart van Oort
- number of candidates: harpsichord: 109 - pianoforte: 33
- laureates harpsichord: 3rd prize: Isabelle Sauveur (France) - 4th prize: Michael Sponseller (USA) and Stéphane Guion-Fuget (France) - 5th prize: Johannes Hämmerle (Austria)
- laureates pianoforte: 1st prize: Kris BeSouthenhout (Australia) - 2nd prize: Jerry Jantunen (Finland) - 3rd prize: Chie Hirai (Japan) - 4th prize: Rémy Cardinale (France)

2004

- Jury harpsichord: Blenine Rannou, Ketil Haugsen, Johan Huys, Gustav Leonhardt, Davitt Moroney, Ludger Rémy
- Jury pianoforte: Wolfgang Brunner, Johan Huys, Linda Nicholson, Alexei Lubimov, Ludger Rémy, Bart van Oort
- number of candidates harpsichord and pianoforte: 137
- laureates harpsichord: 1st prize: Benjamin Alard (France) - 2nd prize: Maria Uspenskaya (Russia) - 3rd prize: Adam Pearl (USA) and Mikhail Yardzhembovskiy (Russia)
- laureates pianoforte: 2nd prize: Keiko Schich ijo (Japan) - 3rd prize: Maria Uspenskaya (Russia) and Irina Zahharenkova (Estonia) - 4th prize: Nicoleta Ion (Roemenië)

2007

- Jury harpsichord: Ketil Haugsen, Johan Huys, Françoise Lengellé, Gustav Leonhardt, Davitt Moroney
- Jury pianoforte: Wolfgang Brunner, Claire Chevallier, Alexei Lubimov, Linda Nicholson, Ludger Rémy, Bart van Oort
- number of candidates: harpsichord: 71 - pianoforte: 41
- laureates harpsichord: 2nd prize Ex Aequo: Julien Wolfs (Belgium) and Francesco Corti (Italy) - 3rd prize: Tomoko Matsuoka (Japan) - 4th prize: Susan Toman (Canada) - 5th prize: Masumi Yamamoto (Japan)
- laureates pianoforte: 2nd prize: Stefania Neonato (Italy) - 3rd prize: Alexandra Koreneva (Russia) and Olga Andryushchenko (Russia)

2010

- Jury harpsichord: Johan Huys, Frédérick Haas, Gustav Leonhardt, Béatrice Martin, Kris Verhelst
- Jury pianoforte: Ludger Rémy, Claire Chevallier, Alexei Lubimov, Linda Nicholson, Bart van Oort
- number of candidates: harpsichord 74 - pianoforte: 26
- laureates harpsichord: Second prize: Kazuya Gunji (Japan) and Maxim Emelyanychev (Russia) - Third prize: Paolo Zanzu (Italy) and Stanislav Gres (Russia)
- laureates pianoforte: First prize: Petra Somlai (Hungary) - Second prize: Olga Pashchenko (Russia) - Third prize: Ksenia Semënova (Russia) - Finalist: Anthony Romaniuk (USA)

2012

- Jury harpsichord: Johan Huys, Christine Schornsheim, Skip Sempé, Menno van Delft and Kenneth Weiss
- number of candidates: 36
- laureates: 1st prize: Mark Edwards (Canada) and Jean Rondeau (France) - 2nd prize: Olga Pashchenko (Russia)

2013

- Jury pianoforte: Johan Huys, Wolfgang Brunner, Alexei Lubimov, Christine Schornsheim, Bart Van Oort
- number of candidates: 30
- laureates: 1st prize / Award of the province West-Flanders: Elizaveta Miller (RU) - 2nd prize: Gili Loftus (CA/IL) - 3rd prize: Miho Haga (JP) - Outhere award: Bobby Mitchell - Award of the public: Gili Loftus (CA/IL)

2015

- Jury harpsichord: Johan Huys, Richard Egarr, Enrea Marcon, Beatrice Martin, Christine Schornsheim
- number of candidates: 60
- Laureates: first prize: Justin Taylor (France) - second prize: Sofya Gandilyan (Russia) - third prize: Mélisande McNabney (Canada) - honorable mentions: Hélène Diot (France) - Nadja Lesaulnier (France)

2016

- Jury pianoforte: Johan Huys, Piet Kuijken, Alexei Lubimov, Christine Schornsheim and Bart van Oort
- number of candidates: 36
- laureates: 2nd prize: Naruhiko Kawaguchi (Japan) - Viacheslav Shelepov (Russia) 3rd prize: Martin Nöbauer (Australia) Honorable mention: Carlos Goicoechea - ESOuthere Award: Naruhiko Kawaguchi - JP

2018

- Jury harpsichord: Johan Huys, Carole Cerasi, Andrea Marcon, Olga Martynova, Skip Sempé, Menno van Delft
- number of candidates: 77
- laureates: 1st prize: Andrea Buccarella (Italy) - 2nd prize: Alexander von HeiBen (Germany) - 3rd prize: Anastasia Antonova (Russia) and Cristiano Gaudio (Italy) Award of the public: Rossella Policardo (Italy)

2019

- Jury pianoforte: Johan Huys, Wolfgang Brunner, Piet Kuyken, Bart van Oort, Christine Schornsheim, Keiko Schichijo
- laureates: 1st prize: Aurelia Visovan (Romania) - 2nd prize: Dmitry Ablogin (Russia) - 3rd prize: Emil Duncumb (No/Uk/Hr) Honorable mention: Ekaterina Polyakova (Russia) Honorable mention: Tzu Yu Yang (Taiwan) Award of the public: Dmitry Ablogin (Russia)

2023

- Jury harpsichord: Korneel Bernolet, Carole Cerasi, Bertrand Cuiller, Christophe Rousset, Catalina Vicens
- laureates: 1st prize: Maciej Skrzeczkowski (Poland) - 2nd prize: Dmytro Kokoshynskyy (Ukraine) - 3rd prize: Gabriel Smallwood (USA) Laureate: Rodrigo Belío (Spain) Award of the public: Dmytro Kokoshynskyy (Ukraine)

=== International competition Musica Antiqua: recorder and other instruments, vocals, as well as (until 1996) ensembles ===
1972

- Jury: Ruth Dyson, Silva Devos, Frans Brüggen, Ferdinand Conrad, Hans-Martin Linde, Wielen Kuijken
- number of candidates: recorder: 41 - ensembles: 8
- laureates: recorder: 2nd prize: Conrad Steinmann (Switzerland) - 3rd prize: Ricardo Kanji (Brazil) and Marion Verbruggen (Netherlands)
- laureates ensembles: 2nd prize: Huelgas Ensemble (Belgium) - 4th prize: Kölner Blockflötenensemble (Germany)

1975

- Jury: Jozef Robijns, president, Silva Devos, Frans Brüggen, Carl Dolmetsch, Günther Höller, Wielen Kuijken, Gustav Scheck, Friedrich von Huene, Katsuya Yokoyama
- number of candidates: recorder: 38 - traverso: 15 - ensembles: 9
- laureates: recorder: geen - traverso: 1st prize: Masahiro Arita (Japan) - 4th prize: W. Hazelzet (Netherlands)
- laureates ensembles: 1st prize: Tokyo Recorder Quartet (Japan) - 2nd prize: Saratoga (France) - 3rd prize: Pfeifergasse Salzburg (Austria)

1978

- Jury: Anner Bijlsma, Barthold Kuijken, Hans-Martin Linde, Colin Tilney, Paul Van Nevel
- number of candidates: ensembles: 18
- laureates: categorie I: 2nd prize: Duo J. Cohan-St. Stubbs (USA) - categorie II: 3rd prize: Collegium Musicum Budapest (Hungary) and Les Ennemis Confus (Belgium)

1981

- Jury: René Clemencic, Christopher Hogwood, Johan Huys, Hans-Martin Linde, Judith Nelson, Jaap Schröder
- number of candidates: vocals: 9 - Baroque cello: 2 - Baroque oboe: 1 - Baroque traverso: 10 - Baroque violin: 2 - Recorder: 28 - Viola da gamba: 1 -
- number of candidates ensembles: 10
- laureates soli: 2nd prize: traverso: T. Ogawa (Japan) – Three Belgians received an honorable mention: Marcel Ponseele (baroque oboe), Philippe Pierlot (gamba) and G. Hulsens (recorder).
- laureates ensembles: 2nd prize: Amsterdam Loeki Stardust Quartet (Netherlands)

1984

- Jury: Judith Nelson, Ingrid Seifert, René Clemencic, Johan Huys, Konrad Junghänel, Hans-Martin Linde, Patrick Peire
- number of candidates soli: recorder: 36 - baroque cello: 1 - baroque oboe: 1 - baroque violin: 5 - lute: 12 - traverso: 4 - viola da gamba: 6 - vocals: 6
- number of candidates ensembles: 12
- laureates: soli: 2nd prize: recorder: Aldo Abreu (Venezuela) and J. Tol (Netherlands)- lute: Robert Barto (USA) - 3rd prize: baroque vocals: D. Minster (USA) - baroque violin: M. Utiger (USA)
- laureates ensembles: 1st prize: Lous Lenes Consort (France) - 2nd prize: Fontana Musicale Wien (Austria)

1987

- Jury: Anthony Bailes, Jessica Cash, Bruce Dickey, Johan Huys, Barthold Kuijken, Marcel Perès, Nigel Rogers, Jordi Savall, Paul Van Nevel
- number of candidates: soli: 52 - ensembles: 14
- laureates: traverso: 2nd prize: Jan De Winne (Belgium) - recorder: 4th prize: B. Karst (Germany)

1990

- Jury: Robert Barto, Johan Huys, Marie Leonhardt, Hans-Martin Linde, Barbara Schlick, August Wenzinger
- number of candidates: baroque violin: 4 - recorder: 47 - viola da gamba: 4 - lute: 12 - traverso: 18 - vocals: 22 - ensembles: 19
- laureates: 1st prize: recorder: Matthias Maute (Germany) - 2nd prize: lute: Joachim Held (Germany) - 3rd prize: traverso: Isabelle Lamfalussy (Belgium) and vocals: Kai Wessel (Germany)
- laureates ensembles: 1st prize: La Fenice (ensemble) (France) and Vier op 'n rij (ensemble) (Belgium) - 2nd prize: La Folia (ensemble) (Austria).

1993

- Jury: René Clemencic, Enrico Gatti, Johan Huys, Barthold Kuijken, Judith Nelson, Toyohiko Satoh, Paul Van Nevel
- number of candidates: baroque oboe: 8 - baroque violin: 5 - recorder: 54 - lute: 7 - traverso: 19 - vocals: 27 - ensembles: 19
- laureates: traverso: 1st prize: Kate Clark (Australia) - vocals: 2nd prize: Elisabeth Scholl (Germany) - recorder: 3rd prize: Michaël Form (Germany) - baroque violin: 3rd prize: Hélène Schmitt (France) - vocals: 4th prize: Chinatsu Kijima (Japan) - baroque oboe: 4th prize: Ann Van Lancker (Belgium)
- laureates ensembles: 1st prize: Trio Van Beethoven (Japan) - 2nd prize: Flûte Harmonique (Germany) - 3rd prize: Les agréments (Canada) - 4th prize: Les Hauts et les Bas (Switzerland)

1996

- Jury: Chiara Banchini, Wielen Kuijken, Barbara Schlick, Philip Pickett, Günther Höller, Toyohiko Satoh, Johan Huys
- number of candidates: Recorder: 42 - Lute: 8 - Strings: 17 - Traverso: 21 - Vocals: 28
- number of candidates ensembles: 27
- laureates: solisten: 1st prize: traverso: Benedek Csalog (Hungary) - 2nd prize: vocals: Yu Kobayashi (Japan) - 3rd prize: gamba: Imke David (Germany) - 4th prize: vocals: Hedvig Åberg (Sweden) - 5th prize: vocals: Jan Van Elsacker (Belgium) - 6th prize: recorder: Martin Schmeding (Germany) - 7th prize: baroque cello: Mimè Yamahiro (Japan)
- laureates ensembles: 1st prize: Trio Eroica - 2nd prize: The Carolinian Consort - 3rd prize: Les Quatre

1999

- Jury: Agata Sapiecha, Barbara Schlick, Paolo Grazzi, Johan Huys, Barthold Kuijken, Wielen Kuijken, Toyohiko Satoh, Marius van Altena
- number of candidates:
- laureates: 1st prize: violin: Takeshi Kiriyama (Japan) - 2nd prize: recorder: Ruth Van Killegem (Belgium) and traverso: Liliko Maeda (Japan) - 3rd prize: traverso: Kiyomi Suga (Japan) and vocals: Elisabeth Holmertz (Sweden) - 4th prize: vocals: Knut Schoch (Germany), - 5th prize: recorder: Carles Vallés (Spain)

2002

- Jury: Masahiro Arita, Patrick Beuckels, Diego Fasolis, Johan Huys, Eva Legêne-Enersson, Marcel Ponseele, Barbara Schlick, Jaap ter Linden, Lucy van Dael
- number of candidates: vocals: 51 - recorder: 39 - traverso: 25 - oboe: 4 - violin: 12 - cello: 11
- laureates: 1st prize: violin: Fiorenza De Donatis (Switzerland) - 2nd prize: tenor: Makoto Sakurada (Japan))- 3rd prize: altus: Yosemeh Adjei (Germany) - 4th prize: traverso: Georges Barthel (France) - 5th prize: altus: Alexander Schneider (Germany ) - 6de prize: ex aequo cello: Marian Minnen (Belgium ), tenor: Seung-Hee Park, cello: Ariane Spiegel (Germany ), and traverso: Stefanie Troffaes (Belgium)

2005

- Jury vocals and strings: Kees Boeke, Patricia Bovi, Jill Feldman, Hélène Schmitt, Marius van Altena
- Jury woodwinds and lute: Johan Huys, Jan De Winne, Bruce Dickey, Michael Schneider, Paul O'dette
- number of candidates: vocals: 38 - baroque violin: 15 - viola da gamba: 5 - Baroque cello: 7 - recorder: 36 - baroque oboe: 7 - cornetto: 1 - lute: 6 - traverso: 20
- laureates: 1st prize: violin: Miki Takahashi (Japan) - 2nd prize: recorder: Tomokazu Ujigawa (Japan) - 3rd prize: violin: Swantje Hoffmann (Germanyl) and traverso: Reiko Tsuiki (Japan) - 4th prize: soprano: Naoco Kaketa (Japan) - 5th prize: cello: Claire Gratton (France)

2008

- Jury: Jan De Winne, Vittorio Ghielmi, Johan Huys, Marcel Ponseele, Anton Steck, Florian Heyerick, Barbara Schlick, Jan Van Elsacker
- number of candidates: violin: 22 - gamba: 18 - recorder: 41 - traverso: 26 - vocals: 14
- laureates: 1st prize: violin: Dmitry Sinkovsky (Russia) - 2nd prize: oboe: Benoît Laurent (Belgium) - 3rd prize: violin: Mayumi Hirasaki (Japan)

2011

International competition Musica Antiqua for traverso, baroque violin, baroque cello and viola da gamba.

- Jury: Jan De Winne, Johan Huys, Philippe Pierlot, Anton Steck, Rainer Zipperling
- number of candidates: violin: 15 - traverso: 14 - cello: 14 - viola da gamba: 7
- Laureates: 1st prize: traverso: Anne Freitag - 2nd prize: viola da gamba: Myriam Rignol - 3rd prize: viola da gamba: Lucile Boulanger - Honorable mention: cello: Toru Yamamoto.

2014

International competition Musica Antiqua for recorder, barokflute, baroque violin, baroque cello and viola da gamba

- Jury: Johan Huys, Amenine Beyer, Erik Bosgraaf, Jan De Winne, Sergei Istomin and Mieneke van der Velden.
- number of candidates: 60: recorder 28 - barokflute 11 - baroque cello 12 - baroque violin 11 - viola da gamba 6.
- Laureates: first prize: Baroque cello: Anna-Lena Perenthaler (Germany) - 2nd prize: violin: Fiona-Emilie Poupard (France) - 3rd prize: baroque cello: Hyngun Cho (Croatia) and recorder: Jan Van Hoecke (Belgium) EUBO Development Trust Award: recorder: Jan Van Hoecke (Belgium) Honorable mention: viola da gamba: Teodoro Baù (Italy)

2017

International competition Musica Antiqua 2017 for recorder, traverso, baroque oboe, baroque violin, baroque cello and viola da gamba

- Jury: Johan Huuys, Jan De Winne, Xenia Löffler, Dorothee Oberlinger, Enrico Onofri, Marco Testori, Mieneke van der Velden, Peter Van Heyghen.
- number of candidates: 124
- Laureates: 1st prize: baroque violin: Evgeny Sviridov (Russia) - 2nd prize: recorder: Yeuntae Jung (South Korea) - 3rd prize: recorder: HyeonHo Jeon (South Korea) EUBO Development Trust Award: recorder: Friederike Vollert (Germany) Honorable mention: recorder: Friederike Vollert (Germany) and baroque violin: Alfa Bakieva (Russia) Award of the public: baroque violin: Evgenii Sviridov (Russia)

2021

International competition Musica Antiqua 2021 for recorder, traverso, baroque oboe, baroque violin, baroque cello and viola da gamba.

2024

International competition Musica Antiqua 2024 for period piano.

- 1st prize: Tomasz Ritter

== Concerts ==
The festival annually programs a number of concerts, master classes and workshops on early music. Usually, the events are concentrated around a specific theme. In addition to a few major concerts as well as the afternoon concerts that have been taking place in the Concertgebouw since 2002, most evening concerts and nocturnes are held in churches such as the Saint James Church, Saint Gilles Church, Carmelite Church, Saint Anne Church and Saint Walburga Church, as well as in other historical locations in Bruges (Stadsschouwburg or town hall) and in the vicinity of Bruges (Ter Doest's barn and Lissewege church, for example). The locations are chosen in function of the acoustics of the room and the spirit of the time of the music to be performed.

During the festival there will also be an exhibition in the halls of the Bruges belfry about instruments and a fair of new instruments for sale. Especially the triennial harpsichord and pianoforte expo.

== VéloBaroque ==
In 2013, MA Festival was enriched with the new concept VéloBaroque, combining a series of concerts with a bicycle tour through the Bruges countryside. Since then it has been organized every year. Only in 2020 this could not take place due to the corona crisis.

== Yearly theme ==
- 1964: Organ Week
- 1965: Johann Sebastian Bach Week
- 1966: Polyphonieweek and Vivaldi Week
- 1967: Georg Friedrich Haendel Week
- 1968: Johann Sebastian Bach and contemporaries
- 1969: Listening of the Baroque and the Renaissance
- 1970: Week of English Music
- 1971: Johann Sebastian Bach and his contemporaries
- 1972: Triumph of the Vocal Art
- 1973: Musica Britannica
- 1974: Musica Polyphonica
- 1975: Monteverdi - Mozart
- 1976: Musica Britannica
- 1977: Johann Sebastian Bach and his contemporaries
- 1978: The Latin World - Vivaldi Week
- 1979: Musica Antiqua
- 1980: Musica Antiqua: Party concerts
- 1981: Musica Antiqua
- 1982: Musica Antiqua
- 1983: From Baroque to Classical
- 1984: Panorama of the Latin World
- 1985: Princes of the Music
- 1986: From Baroque to Classical
- 1987: The Latin World
- 1988: Musica Britannica
- 1989: Viennese and Brussels Chapel Masters
- 1990: The Latin World
- 1991: Musica Britannica - Vivaldi and Venice - Mozart and contemporaries
- 1992: Spanje en de Nieuwe Wereld - Bach and Contemporaries
- 1993: From Middle Ages to Early Romanticism
- 1994: Musica Britannica - Musica Sacra
- 1995: Bach and Contemporaries - Henry Purcell
- 1996: The Mediterranean World - A Thousand Years of Austria
- 1997: Musica Sacra - Musica Britannica
- 1998: Bach and Contemporaries
- 1999: The Age of Enlightenment
- 2000: Musica Sacra - Musica Britannica
- 2001: Bach and Contemporaries
- 2002: Musica Festiva - Musica Polyphonica - Musica Medditeranea
- 2003: Musica Festiva - Musica Sacra - Musica Britannica
- 2004: About Bach
- 2005: Corpus in Musica Antiqua
- 2006: Venezia - Mozart
- 2007: L'Année d'Orphée and Paris
- 2008: Rule Britannia!
- 2009: Modern Times in Early Music
- 2010: Orient Express
- 2011: Testament - Praise to life and death
- 2012: Triste plaisir et douloureuse joye
- 2013: Celebrate this festival
- 2014: Metamorphoses
- 2015: Omnia vanitas
- 2016: Praise of Folly
- 2017: La Divina Commedia
- 2018: Cherchez la femme
- 2019: Ex Machina. God, man and machine
- 2020: Your window into early music
- 2021: Mind and body

== Partners ==
- Concertgebouw Brugge
- Festival of Flanders
- Nationale Loterij
- Stad Brugge
- Klara
- Conservatorium Brugge
- Evil Penguin TV
- Outhere Music
- Westtoer
- Festival Musical du Hainaut
- Federatie van Muziekfestivals in Vlaanderen (FMiV)
- European Festivals Association
- Rema – Early Music in Europe
- Orgelmaker de Munck-Claessens
- Bozar

== Literature ==
- Programmabrochures 1964 to 2021
- Robrecht Dewitte: 40 Jaar Musica Antiqua, 1964-2003, Bruges, 2003

== CDs ==
Since 2013, one of the candidates of the MA Competition is given the opportunity to record a CD with the internationally known Ricercar label.

- Bobby Mitchell – 2013
- Jan Van Hoecke – 2014
- Justin Taylor – 2015
- Naruhiko Kawaguchi – 2016
- Evgeny Sviridov – 2017
- Andrea Buccarella – 2018
- Aurelia Visovan - 2020
