= List of harpsichordists =

Musicians who play the harpsichord are known as harpsichordists. This list includes post 19th-century harpsichordists. Notable earlier harpsichordists mostly appear on the list of Baroque composers.

== A ==
- Abraham Abreu
- Isolde Ahlgrimm
- Benjamin Alard
- Rinaldo Alessandrini
- Tori Amos
- Bob van Asperen
- Emilie Autumn
- Valda Aveling

== B ==
- Enrico Baiano
- Pieter-Jan Belder
- Ivor Bolton
- Michael Borgstede
- Hendrik Bouman
- Bradley Brookshire

== C ==
- Nellie Chaplin
- Elisabeth Chojnacka
- William Christie
- Elaine Comparone
- Gary Cooper
- Mónica Cosachov
- Alan Cuckston
- Laurence Cummings
- Alan Curtis

== D ==
- Ottavio Dantone
- Thurston Dart
- Fernando De Luca
- Scott Dettra
- Huguette Dreyfus

== E ==
- Richard Egarr
- Mahan Esfahani

== F ==
- Nicolau de Figueiredo
- Céline Frisch
- Albert Fuller

== G ==
- Anne Gallet
- Martin Galling
- Lorenzo Ghielmi
- Kenneth Gilbert
- Lillian Gordis

== H ==
- Malcolm Hamilton
- Pierre Hantaï
- Barbara Harbach
- Ketil Haugsand
- Anton Heiller
- Robert Hill
- Asako Hirabayashi
- Christopher Hogwood

== J ==
- Eileen Joyce

== K ==
- Rudolf Kelber
- Ralph Kirkpatrick
- Igor Kipnis
- Ton Koopman
- Nicholas Kraemer

== L ==
- Marcelle de Lacour
- Wanda Landowska
- Cosimo Damiano Lanza
- Gustav Leonhardt
- Raymond Leppard
- Christiana Lin
- Alexei Lubimov
- Giedrė Lukšaitė-Mrázková

== M ==
- Nicholas McGegan
- George Malcolm
- Alessandro De Marchi
- Sylvia Marlowe
- Béatrice Martin
- Mitzi Meyerson
- Francis Monkman
- Patrick Montan
- Davitt Moroney
- Lars Ulrik Mortensen
- Oscar Milani

== N ==
- Nikolaus Newerkla
- Anthony Newman
- Hervé Niquet

== P ==
- Temple Painter
- Joseph Payne
- Martin Pearlman
- Yella Pessl
- Daniel Pinkham
- Trevor Pinnock
- Rafael Puyana

== R ==
- Mario Raskin
- Karl Richter
- Jean Rondeau
- Scott Ross
- Christophe Rousset
- Gilbert Rowland
- Zuzana Růžičková

== S ==
- Byron Schenkman
- János Sebestyén
- Liselotte Selbiger
- Skip Sempé
- Luciano Sgrizzi
- Millicent Silver
- Heather Slade-Lipkin
- Andreas Staier
- Masaaki Suzuki
- Simone Stella

== T ==
- Colin Tilney
- Yann Tiersen
- Rosalyn Tureck

== V ==
- Fernando Valenti
- Jos Van Immerseel
- Blandine Verlet
- Robert Veyron-Lacroix
- Jory Vinikour

== W ==
- Helmut Walcha
- Peter Watchorn
- Guy Whatley
- Blanche Winogron
- Ernst Victor Wolff
- Violet Gordon-Woodhouse
