= Nicolau de Figueiredo =

Brazilian harpsichordist (1960–2016)

Nicolau de Figueiredo (9 September 1960 — 6 July 2016) was a Brazilian harpsichordist, organist, pianist, and conductor.

== Biography ==
Born in São Paulo, de Figueiredo studied piano, organ, harpsichord and chamber music with such teachers as Irene de Sá Picazio, Sonia Muniz, Maria Helena Silveira, Helena Jank, and Roberto de Regina. In 1980, he relocated to Geneva for studies at the Conservatoire de Musique de Genève, where his teachers included Christiane Jaccottet, Lionel Rogg, Michel Corboz, Kenneth Gilbert, Scott Ross, and Gustav Leonhardt. In 1984, he was a prize winner in the Concours International de Clavecin de Nantes. In 1985, he was a prize winner at international harpsichord competitions in Nantes and in Rome.

From 1990 to 2000, de Figueiredo taught at the Schola Cantorum Basiliensis. He also served on the faculty of the Centre de Musique Baroque de Versailles Versailles Music Center and the University of Dortmund. From 2004 to 2007, de Figueiredo taught at the Conservatoire de Paris. As a continuo player, de Figueiredo performed with such early and baroque music ensembles as Concerto Köln, the Freiburger Barockorchester, the Akademie für Alte Musik Berlin, Europa Galante, and the Orchestra of the Age of Enlightenment.

On several commercial opera recordings conducted by René Jacobs, of Mozart's The Marriage of Figaro and Così fan tutte, de Figueiredo was a featured continuo player. His own commercial recordings included albums of works by Domenico Scarlatti and the 2010 album O Tenor Perdido with cellist Dimos Goudaroulis. His legacy also includes recordings of works by Soler, Seixas, Haydn, and Johann Christian Bach.

In 2011, de Figueiredo returned to Brazil to work as a teacher, harpsichordist and conductor. He participated in the inauguration of the Praça das Artes in 2012. He became a harpsichord teacher at the Escola Municipal de Música de São Paulo (São Paulo Municipal School of Music).

On 6 July 2016, de Figueiredo died of a heart attack at age 55 in his home city of São Paulo.
