= Antonio Soler (composer) =

Spanish composer

- Born: Antonio Francisco Javier José Soler Ramos; 1729; Olot, Kingdom of Spain
- Died: December 20, 1783

Antonio Francisco Javier José Soler Ramos, also known as Padre ('Father', in the religious sense) Antonio Soler, known in Catalan as Antoni Soler i Ramos (baptized 3 December 1729 – died 20 December 1783) was a Catalan composer whose works span the late Baroque and early Classical music eras. He is best known for his many mostly one-movement keyboard sonatas.

== Early life and training ==
Soler was born in Olot (Catalonia, Spain) in the County of Besalú. In 1736, when he was six, he entered the Escolania of the Monastery of Montserrat where he studied music with the resident mestre Benet Esteve and organist Benet Valls. In 1746, when he was only 17, he was appointed Director of Music in Lleida, and some sources say he also exercised that position at La Seu d'Urgell. In 1752, when he was 23, he moved to Castile, having been admitted to the Monastery of San Lorenzo del Escorial for his talents as a composer and organist. His fame soon led Domenico Scarlatti and José de Nebra to accept him as a student, completing his high-level training there.

== Life at El Escorial Monastery and Royal Court ==
Soler entered the monastery as a novice in 1752, at the age of 23, and took holy orders a year later, embarking on a busy routine as a Hieronymite at El Escorial (near Madrid). There he studied under José de Nebra and (according to some sources) Domenico Scarlatti, before teaching in his own right. He was appointed music teacher for the Infantes Antonio and Gabriel, sons of Carlos III.

While there, he was known to have 20-hour workdays, in the course of which he produced more than 500 compositions. Among these were around 150 keyboard sonatas, many believed to have been written for his pupil, the Infante Don Gabriel, a son of King Carlos III. Other pieces include Christmas villancicos and Catholic liturgical music, including Masses. He died in the monastery of San Lorenzo del Escorial.

== Compositions ==
Sonata No. 84 in D Major for Organ

Concerto No. 1 in C Major for 2 Organs

Padre Soler's most celebrated works are his keyboard sonatas, which are comparable to those composed by Domenico Scarlatti (with whom he may have studied) but are more varied in form than those of Scarlatti, with some pieces in three or four movements; Scarlatti's pieces are in one (mostly) or two movements. Soler's sonatas were cataloged in the early twentieth century by Fr. Samuel Rubio and so all have 'R' numbers assigned.

Soler also composed concertos, quintets for organ and strings, motets, masses and pieces for solo organ. He also wrote a treatise, Llave de la modulación ("The Key to Modulation", 1762).

Soler's Six Concertos for Two Organs remain in the repertoire and have often been recorded. A fandango authored by Soler, and probably more often performed than any other work of his, is claimed by Isidro Barrio and some others to be of doubtful authorship.

"I told him (i.e. Samuel Rubio - ed.) that I had serious doubts about Soler's authorship of this work. Rubio then subjected the work to a thorough examination and informed me that I was right: 'I am compelled to cast a doubt on Soler's authorship of this work although I had previously confirmed it (...). I hope to explain in greater depth at a later date the reasons which make me doubt the authenticity of the work. At the time being, however, we can declare the hunt open for the true author.'"

== Selected discography ==
=== Works solely by Soler ===
- Soler: Complete Sonatas played by harpsichordist Pieter-Jan Belder. Brilliant Classics
- Soler: Sonatas,Fandango, Concerto pour deux Clavecins. played by Rafael Puyana and Genoveva Gálvez. Philips
- Soler: 8 Sonatas, Fandango. Played by harpsichordist Nicolau de Figueiredo. Passacaille 943
- Soler: Fandango, 9 Sonatas. Played by harpsichordist Scott Ross. Erato
- Soler: Fandango, Sept Sonates. Played by harpsichordist Elisabeth Chojnacka. Erato STU 71163
- Soler: Fandango & Sonatas. Played by harpsichordist David Schrader. Cedille 004
- Soler: Harpsichord Sonatas, vol. II. Played by harpsichordist David Schrader. Cedille 009
- Soler: Sonatas. Played by pianist Elena Riu. Ensayo 9818
- Soler: Complete Harpsichord Works. Played by Bob van Asperen (12 disks). Astrée
- Soler: Sonatas para piano. Played by pianist Alicia de Larrocha. EMI CLASSICS
- Soler: Los 6 Quintetos para clave y cuerda. Played by harpsichordist Genoveva Gálvez and the string quartet Agrupación Nacional de Música de Cámara. EMI CLASSICS
- Soler: Sonatas for Harpsichord. Played by Gilbert Rowland. A multi-volume project on Naxos Records.
- Soler: Six Concertos for Two Keyboard Instruments. Played by Kenneth Gilbert and Trevor Pinnock. Archiv Produktion 453171-2
- Soler: Six Concertos for Two Organs. Played by Mathot and Koopman. Warner WEA/Atlantic/Erato ZK45741
- Soler: Six Concertos for Two Organs. Played by E. Power Biggs (Flentrop organ on the left) and Daniel Pinkham (Hess organ on the right). Recorded at the Busch-Reisinger Museum, Harvard University, 1961. LP: Columbia Masterworks Stereo MS 6208 (Library of Congress catalog card number R60-1383)
- Soler: 19 Sonatas. Played by Anna Malikova. Classical Records CR-049
- Soler: Keyboard Sonatas and the "Fandango". Played by Maggie Cole. Virgin Classics
- Soler: 13 Sonatas. Played by pianist Marie-Luise Hinrichs. Warner Classics.
- Padre Soler: Sonates pour Clavier. Played by pianist Luis Fernando Pérez. Mirare.

=== Works by Soler & other composers ===
- Favourite Spanish Encores. Played by pianist Alicia de Larrocha with Rafael Frühbeck de Burgos conducting the Royal Philharmonic Orchestra. London/Decca Legends 467687
- Grandes Pianistas Españoles. Played by pianist Alicia de Larrocha. Rtve 65235
- Piano Español. Played by pianist Jorge Federico Osorio. Cedille 075
- Soler: Keyboard Sonatas Nos. 1-15. Played by pianist Martina Filjak. Naxos 8.572515
