= Pashchenko =

Pashchenko, Paschenko, Pașcenco, or Pashenko (Ukrainian or Russian: Пащенко) is a gender-neutral Ukrainian surname derived from the given name Pavel (Pasha). It may refer to:

- Alexandru Pașcenco (born 1989), Moldovan footballer
- Igor Pashchenko, Ukrainian Paralympic athlete
- Olga Pashchenko (born 1986), Russian musician
- Serghei Pașcenco (born 1982), Moldovan footballer
