= Jörg-Andreas Bötticher =

German harpsichordist, organist and musicologist

Jörg-Andreas Bötticher (born 1964) is a German harpsichordist, organist and musicologist.

== Life ==
Bötticher was born in Berlin. After several years of music lessons and experience as a keyboarder in a band in his youth, he studied at the Schola Cantorum Basiliensis with Jean-Claude Zehnder (organ) and Andreas Staier (harpsichord). This was followed by studies with Jesper Bøje Christensen. Since 1997, he has been leading a harpsichord class at the Schola Cantorum and teaches historically informed performance at the Basler Musikhochschule.

He is the organist of the Predigerkirche in Basel, where he is also co-initiator and artistic director of the complete performance of all Bach cantatas (2004-2012) and the "Abendmusiken in der Predigerkirche" (2013 ff.). Several CD recordings include works by Alessandro Poglietti, Michelangelo Rossi, Gottlieb Muffat, Ignazio Albertini, Johann Friedrich Fasch and others. With the baroque violinist Hélène Schmitt, he dedicated himself to the violin repertoire of the 17th century, and with Chiara Banchini he recorded the sonatas for violin and harpsichord obbligato by Johann Sebastian Bach. Since 2011, he has been giving regular concerts with the baroque violinist Plamena Nikitassova.

Bötticher is also active in the field of musicology. Among his most important publications are articles in the Bach-Jahrbuch of the Neue Bachgesellschaft and the article Generalbass in the Musiklexikon [Musik in Geschichte und Gegenwart] (with Jesper Christensen).

== Publications ==
Articles

- "In jeder Fingerspitze ein Theil der musikalischen Seele" – Das ‚Toucher‘ auf Clavierinstrumenten als Brücke zwischen sinnlicher, seelischer und geistiger Erfahrung. In Concerto – Das Magazin für Alte Musik. 30. Jg. pp. 251–252, ISSN 0177-5944.
- "Eine sonderbare Anmuth" – Grazie und Anmut in der Musik für Tasteninstrumente. In Luigi Collarile, Alexandra Nigito (ed.): In organo pleno – Festschrift für Jean-Claude Zehnder zum 65th Geburtstag. Peter Lang, Bern 2007, ISBN 978-3-03911-210-4, pp. 277–326.

Recordings

- Giuseppe Peranda: Sacred Music from Dresden. (Missa in a, Repleti sunt omnes, Accurite gentes, Timor et tremor, Factum est proelium; Vincenzo Albrici: Sinfonia à 2; David Pohle: Sonata à 6.) Miriam Feuersinger, Maria Cristina Kiehr (sopranos), Alex Potter (alto), Raphael Höhn, Jakob Pilgram (tenors), Markus Flaig (bass), Abendmusiken Basel, Jörg-Andreas Bötticher (organ and conducting). Coviello Classics, 2018.
