= Alexander Sung =

Chinese pianist

Alexander Sung (born 1947 in Tianjin) is a Chinese harpsichordist and pianist. His family moved to Hong Kong before the 1949 Chinese Revolution where he attended Pui Ching Middle School. After studies at the Mozarteum in Salzburg, Austria, under Heinz Scholz, the brother of Robert Scholz, Alexander Sung studied harpsichord under Isolde Ahlgrimm and piano under Richard Hauser in Vienna.

In 1971 he won fifth prize for harpsichord at the competition Musica Antiqua Bruges and fourth prize for harpsichord at the 1972 International Johann Sebastian Bach Competition. He taught harpsichord and piano at Virginia Commonwealth University, the University of Richmond, and Soochow University in Taiwan. He currently teaches and guest lectures in Taipei and Hong Kong.

Alexander Sung plays a 9-foot Blüthner "Model 1" concert grand piano from Germany and plays a John Morley "Kirkmann" double manual harpsichord from England.

== Discography ==
- Pleasure for the Soul: Music of Wolfgang Amadeus Mozart for Harpsichord (KV 331, 309, 311) (2010)
- Serenity for the Soul: Music of J.S. Bach for Piano (Three Parts Inventions, Six Little Preludes, Italian Concerto BWV 971) (2010)
- Romance for the Soul: Music by Franz Schubert for Piano (Impromptus & Six Movements Musicaux) (2010)
- Love Affair for the Soul: Piano Music of Johannes Brahms (Opus 9 variations) & Franz Liszt (Transcription on two Liedes by Robert Schumann, Liebeslied in A flat Major, Frühlingsnacht F sharp Major) (2012)
- Pleasure for the Soul (Parts II & III): Music of Wolfgang Amadeus Mozart for Harpsichord (KV 330, 310, 354, 576, 570, 545) (2013)
- The Little Mermaid: A Musical Journey with Wolfgang Amadeus Mozart (KV 332, 264, 333), Harpsichord (2014)
- Eternal Love for the Soul: Music by Robert Schumann for Piano (Opus 82, 99, & 18) (2015)
- Naturally Bach I: Two Parts Inventions BWV 772-786 and Partita II in C Minor BWV 826, Piano (2019)
- Naturally Bach II: Three Parts Inventions BWV 787-801 and Partita I in B flat Major BWV 825, Piano (2019)
- A Musical Journey with Franz Schubert & J.S. Bach (Piano Sonata in C minor D 958, Partita No 5 BWV 829) (2019)
