= Hélène Schmitt =

French musician

Hélène Schmitt is a prize-winning French violinist and a professor of baroque violin in Boulogne-Billancourt.

Schmitt first started out as a chamber musician before specialising in baroque music. She spent 10 years in Bâle, next to Chiara Banchini and Jesper Bøje Christensen. Nowadays, she is very close to Jörg-Andreas Bötticher and Rolf Lislevand with whom she often plays in concert.

== Prizes ==
- Musica Antiqua Bruges, as a soloist, 1993
- Van Wassenaer in Amsterdam, 1994
- Schmelzerpreis in Melk, Austria, 1996

== Discography ==
- Marco Uccellini (1610–1680) – Œuvres pour violon (1999)
- Johann Sebastian Bach (1685–1750) – pièces pour violon et basse continue (2000)
- Ignazio Albertini (1644–1685) – sonates pour violon et basse continue. (2002).
- Giovanni Stefano Carbonelli (1690–1772) – sonates pour violon et basse continue. (2003).
- Johann Sebastian Bach (1685–1750) – Sei Solo a Violino senza Basso accompagnato – I et II. (2005).
- Johann Heinrich Schmelzer (ca.1620-1680) – Sonatae a violino solo. (2007).
- Nicola Matteis – (ca.1670–ca.1698) Ayrs for the violin. (2009)
- Mozart and Beethoven – Sonates pour pianoforte & violon. (2011)
- Heinrich Biber, Rosary Sonatas (Label Aeolus).
