= Dmitry Sinkovsky =

Russian conductor, concertmaster, and violinist

Dmitry Evgenyevich Sinkovsky (Russian: Дмитрий Евгеньевич Синьковский) (born 1980, Moscow) is a Russian virtuoso violinist, concertmaster, countertenor and conductor. Sinkovsky started playing violin at age 5.

He has been a prizewinner in the Bach Competition (2006), Musica Antiqua Competition (2008), and Romanus Weichlein (2009). He has performed in Europe, Russia, Canada, Australia and the United States with such orchestras as the Canadian Arion Baroque Orchestra, Finnish Helsinki Baroque Orchestra, German Concerto Köln, Italian Il Giardino Armonico, Spanish Sevillian Orquesta Barroca, Australian Australian Brandenburg Orchestra, both Pratum Integrum and Musica Petropolitana of Russia and in the United States with the Seattle Symphony.

In 2011, he founded the La Voce Strumentale ensemble in Moscow and from 2012 to 2014 was a conductor of Il Complesso Barocco. There he worked with the mezzo-soprano Joyce DiDonato, with whom he traveled to Europe and the United States. He has recorded numerous works with such German orchestras as WDR Symphony Orchestra Cologne and North German Radio Symphony Orchestra, on the Caro Mitis label. Since 2005 he has worked as a teacher at the Moscow Conservatory where he teaches both viola and violin, and in September 2009 he received Francesco Ruggeri's violin at the Jumpstart Jr. Competition in the Amsterdam Concertgebouw.
