= Myriam Rignol =

French musician (born 1988)

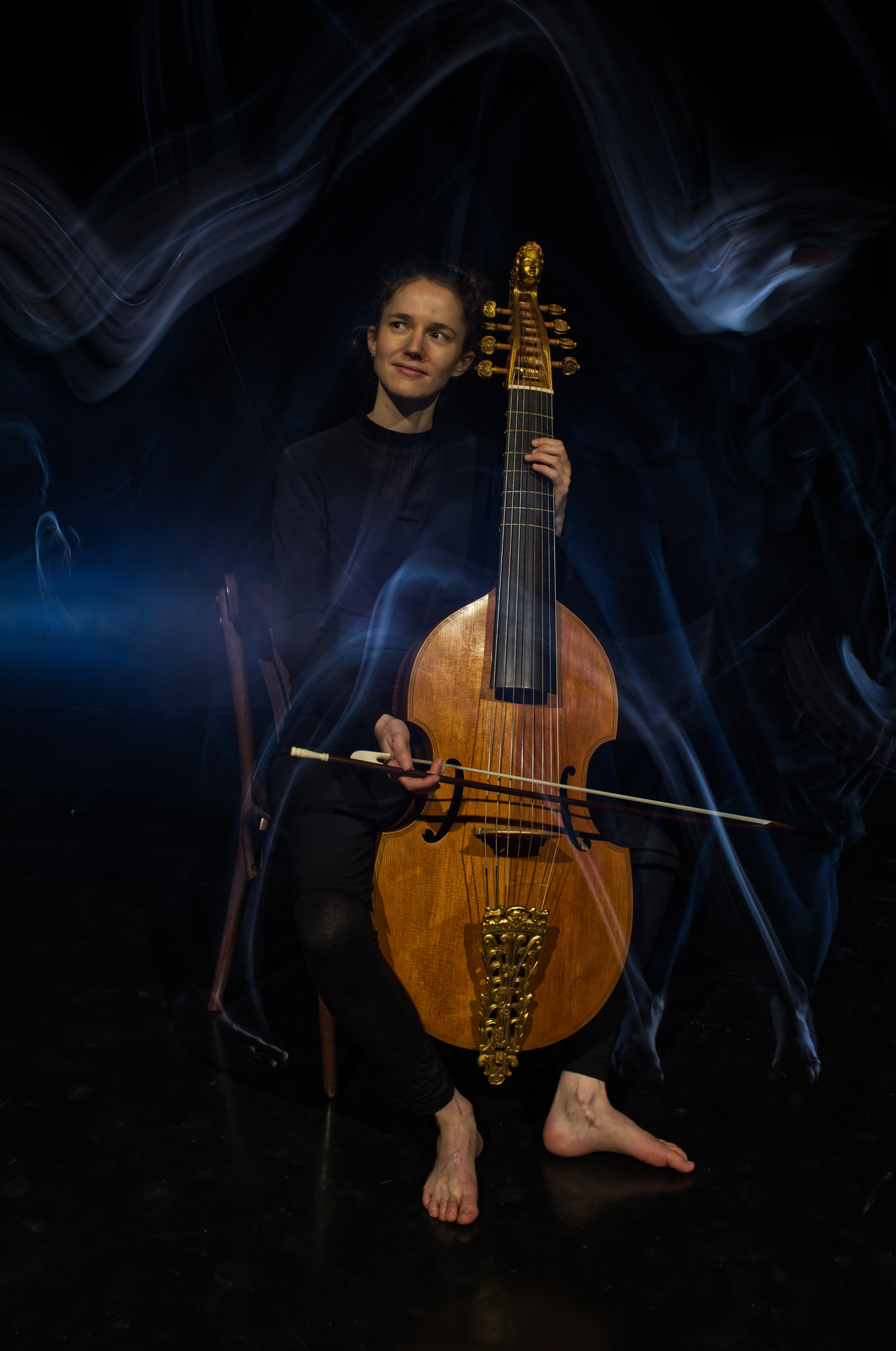

Background information
- Born: July 12, 1988 (age 38); Perpignan, France
- Genres: Baroque music, Chamber music, Medieval music, Renaissance music, Contemporary music
- Occupations: Musician, gambist
- Instrument: Viola de gamba
- Years active: 2011–Present

Myriam Rignol (born 1988) is a French viola da gamba player and teacher.

== Training ==
Myriam Rignol began her viola da gamba studies at the Regional Conservatory of Music in Perpignan. She then went on to study at the National Conservatory of Music and Dance in Lyon, the Cologne University of Music, and the Royal Conservatory of Brussels. Her main teachers have been Christian Sala, Marianne Muller, Emmanuel Balssa, Rainer Zipperling, Wieland Kuijken, Jordi Savall, and Philippe Pierlot.

== Career ==
=== Teaching ===
Rignol holds an advanced degree in early music. In 2011, with the backing of the Superior School of Music in Bourgogne-Franche-Comté, she created the viola da gamba class at the Grand Besançon conservatory. Since September 2021, she also taught viola da gamba at the National Conservatory of Music and Dance in Lyon.

Rignol also frequently gives classes, workshops, and masterclasses at the Juilliard School in New York, the National Tsing Hua University Nan Da Campus in Taiwan, and the Foundation Les Arts Florissants.

=== Ensembles ===
Rignol is regularly invited as a soloist, ensemble player, and orchestral musician in many European and American countries, as well as Senegal, Lebanon, and Japan.

In 2007, she co-founded the ensemble Les Timbres with Yoko Kawakubo and Julien Wolfs. She continues to serve as an artistic director.

As a basso continuo player she regularly performs with the ensembles A Nocte Temporis directed by Reinoud Van Mechelen and Les Arts Florissants directed by William Christie and Paul Agnew.

She actively collaborates with the Ricercar Consort, Pygmalion, Ensemble Correspondences, La Main Harmonique, I Gemelli, and many other artists, including Marc Mauillon, Angélique Mauillon, Marie Van Rijn, Cyril Auvity, Thomas Dunford, and Léa Desandre.

She is a member of the Musicall Humors consort with Lucile Boulanger, Julien Leonard, Joshua Cheatham, and Nicholas Milne. She also forms a viol duet with Mathilde Vialle.

In addition, she occasionally collaborates with L'Achéron, Capriccio Stravagante, Hesperion XXI, Arcangelo, and Le Poème Harmonique.

=== Awards ===
- 2008 - Fourth premio, public prize and special jury prize for the best interpretation of the basso continuo at the tenth Premio Bonporti International Chamber Music Competition with Les Timbres.
- 2009 - First prize at the Bruges Early Music Festival and prize for the best contemporary creation under the acronym YoJu-Mi KaWoRi with Les Timbres.
- 2010 - First prize at the Yamanashi Competition in Kôfu, Japan.
- 2011 - Second Prize and Audience Prize at the Bruges Early Music Festival.
- 2011 - Second Bach-Abel Wettbewerb Prize in Köthen, Germany.
- 2012 - Pro Musicis prize with Les Timbres.
- 2013 - Third Prize and Audience Prize at the Internationale Telemann Wettbewerb in Magdeburg with Les Timbres.
- 2013 - Winner of the Clics Jeunes grant from the Fondation de France – Jacolin Dufresne grant, for her project “Unpublished recording of Rameau with a viola by Tilman”.

In 2023 she was named Chevalière de l'ordre des arts et lettres.

== Discography ==
=== Solo ===
- 6 suites BWV 1007 à 1012 - Johann Sebastian Bach, 2020.

=== Chamber music ===
==== with Les Timbres ====
- Six Trio - Georg Philipp Telemann, 2025.
- La Gamme - Marin Marais, 2022, diapason d'or.
- Sonate à doi, violine & viola da gamba con cembalo opus I & 2 - Dietrich Buxtehude, 2020, diapason d'or.
- Concerts Royaux - François Couperin, 2018, diapason d'or.
- La Suave melodia avec Harmonia Lenis - Andrea Falconieri, Dario Castello, Giovanni Paolo Cima, Tarquinio Merula, Marco Uccellini, Giovanni Battista Buonamente, Giovanni Gabrieli, Giovanni Battista Riccio, Francesco Turini, Giovanni Martino Cesare, Agostino Guerrieri, 2015.
- Pièces de Clavecin en concert, intégrale - Jean-Philippe Rameau, 2014 diapason d'or.

==== with other ensembles ====
- Forqueray, intégrale des pièces de viole - avec Gabriel Rignol, Julien Wolfs, Lucile Boulanger et Mathilde Vialle, 2024.
- Je m'abandonne à vous, airs sur des poésies de la Comtesse de la Suze with Marc Mauillon and Angélique Mauillon, 2021.
- Le coucher du Roi, musiques pour la chambre de Louis XIV with Thibaut Roussel and Les Musiciens du Roi, 2021.
- Quatre Suites de clavecin de François Dieupart with Marie Van Rhijn, Héloïse Gaillard, Tami Trauman and Pierre Rinderknecht, 2020.
- Barricades - with Jean Rondeau, Thomas Dunford and Léa Dessandre, 2020.
- A deux violes esgales, Sainte Colombe, Marin Marais - with Mathilde Vialle and the participation of Thibaut Roussel and Julien Wolfs, 2020.
- Pathodia sacra et profana, Constantin Huygens - with Marie Van Rijn and Cyril Auvity, 2020.
- Monsieur de Sainte Colombe et ses filles - with the Ricercar Consort, 2020.
- The Dubhlinn Gardens, musiques irlandaises des 17ème et du 18ème siècle - with A Nocte Temporis, 2019.
- Leçons de Ténèbres, Michel Lambert - with Marc Mauillon, Thibaut Roussel and Marouan Mankar-Bennis, 2018.
- Inventions, Denis Dufour - with Furians ensemble, 2018.
- Resveries, pièces du livre V, Marin Marais - with the Ricercar Consort, 2014.
- Infernum in Paradise, consort songs & music - with Musicall Humors, 2012.
- L’Aura Mia Sacra, Cipriano de Rore - with La Main Harmonique, 2013.

=== Basso continuo ===
==== with Les Arts Florissants ====
- N'espérez plus mes yeux, airs sérieux et à boire vol. 3, 2021.
- Les Arts Florissants, 40 ans 1979-2019, 2019.
- L’Incoronazione di Poppea, Claudio Monteverdi, 2019.
- Si vous vouliez un jour, airs sérieux et à boire vol.2, 2019, diapason d'or.
- Bien que l’amour, airs sérieux et à boire vol. 1, 2016.

==== with A Nocte Temporis ====
- Cantates françaises, Clérambault, 2017.

==== with Ensemble Correspondances ====
- Leçons de Ténèbres, de Lalande, 2015.
- Meslanges pour la chapelle d'un Prince, Etienne Moulinié, 2013.
- Litanies de la Vierge, Marc-Antoine Charpentier, 2013.
- L’Archange & le Lys, messe & motets, Antoine Boësset, 2011.

=== Orchestral music ===
==== with Ensemble Correspondances ====
- Les Plaisirs du Louvre, airs pour la chambre de Louis XIII, 2020.
- Histoires sacrées, Marc-Antoine Charpentier, 2019.
- Le ballet royal de la nuit, 2018.
- La descente d’Orphée aux Enfers, Marc-Antoine Charpentier, 2017.

==== with A Nocte Temporis ====
- Orphée aux Enfers, Marc-Antoine Charpentier, 2020.
- Dumesny, haute-contre de Lully, 2019.

==== with I Gemelli ====
- Orfeo, Claudio Monteverdi, 2020.

==== with Pygmalion ====
- Enfers, récital, Stéphane Degout, 2018.
- L’Orfeo, Luigi Rossi, 2017.
- Stravaganza d’Amore, la naissance de l'opéra chez les Médicis, 2017.
- Köthener Trauermusik BWV 244a, Johann Sebastian Bach, 2014.
- Dardanus, Jean-Philippe Rameau, 2013.
- Missa 1733, Johann Sebastian Bach, 2012.
- Missae Breves BWV 233 & 236, Johann Sebastian Bach, 2010.
- Missae Breves BWV 234 & 235, Johann Sebastian Bach, 2008.

==== with Le Poème Harmonique ====
- Phaéton, Jean-Baptiste Lully, 2018.

==== with Il Gardellino ====
- Schlage doch gewünschte Stunde, cantates de Bach, Telemann et Hoffmann, 2012.

== See also ==
=== External links ===
- Le concert de demain pour Myriam Rignol, sur francemusique.fr, le 11 juin 2020.
- La viole de gambe, comment ça marche ? à l'occasion des 40 ans des Arts Florissants, sur francemusique.fr, le 18 décembre 2019.

== Sources ==
- This page is a translation of its French equivalent.
