= Jesper Bøje Christensen =

Danish musicologist and harpsichordist (1944–2026)

Jesper Bøje Christensen (3 December 1944 – 8 July 2026) was a Danish harpsichordist and music researcher, especially in the field of basso continuo.

== Life and career ==
Born in Copenhagen, Christensen was a lecturer in historical composition, continuo and performance practice at the Royal Danish Academy of Music in Copenhagen from 1972 to 1985. He has taught harpsichord, basso continuo, chamber music and performance practice at the Schola Cantorum Basiliensis since 1988. He has also been a visiting professor at the CNSM in Lyon, at the Département de musique ancienne of the Geneva Conservatory, at the Johann-Joseph-Fux-Conservatory Graz, as well as at numerous master classes. In 1992, 1995, 1998, and 2001, Christensen was a member of the jury at the international harpsichord competition within the framework of the MAfestival Brugge and in 2006 president of the jury at the chamber music competition Premio Bonporti in Rovereto, as well as several times chairman of the Telemann competition in Magdeburg.

Christensen was the author of the textbook Die Grundlagen des Generalbassspiels im 18. Jahrhundert (Kassel 1992) and with Jörg-Andreas Bötticher author of the article Generalbass in the Musiklexikon Musik in Geschichte und Gegenwart.

Christensen died on 8 July 2026, aged 81.

== Publications ==
- Die Grundlagen des Generalbassspiels im 18. Jahrhundert. Ein Lehrbuch nach zeitgenössischen Quellen. Bärenreiter, Kassel 1992. (6th edition 2012, ISMN 979-0-006-48912-1)
  - English translation by J. Bradford Robinson under the title Eighteenth Century Continuo Playing. A historical guide to the basics. Bärenreiter, Kassel 2002. (2nd edition. 2014, ISMN 979-0-006-50549-4)
  - French translation by Marinette Extermann under the title Les Fondements de la Basse Continue au XVIIIe siècle. Une méthode basée sur les sources d'époque. Bärenreiter, Kassel 2002. (4th edition. 2013, ISMN 979-0-006-49820-8
  - Italian translation by Maria Luisa Baldassari under the title Fondamenti di prassi del basso continuo nel secolo XVIII. Metodo basato sulle fonti originali. Ut Orpheus Edizioni 2003, ISMN 979-0-2153-0823-7.
  - Czech translation by Dagmar Kupčiková under the title Základy generálbasové hry v 18. století. Učebnice dle historických pramenů. Brno 2011. (2nd edition. 2014, ISBN 978-80-7460-063-0)
- Zur Generalbaß-Praxis bei Händel und Bach. In Theorie und Praxis bei Bach und Händel. (Basler Jahrbuch für Historische Musikpraxis. 9). Amadeus, Winterthur 1985, ISBN 3-905049-33-3.
- Über das Verhältnis zwischen der Solostimme und der Lage der Aussetzung: Zu einigen "Heiligen Kühen" des Generalbaß-Spiels im 20. Jahrhundert. In "Was der General-Baß sey?". Beiträge zu Theorie und Praxis II. (Basler Jahrbuch für Historische Musikpraxis. 19). Amadeus, Winterthur 1995, ISBN 3-905049-71-6.
- with Jörg-Andreas Bötticher Generalbaß. In Ludwig Finscher (ed.): Die Musik in Geschichte und Gegenwart. 2nd edition. Volume 3, Bärenreiter, Kassel 1995.
- "Del Modo di Guidare colla Battuta e senza". Francesco Maria Veracini über das Dirigieren. In Direktion und Dirigieren. (Basler Jahrbuch für Historische Musikpraxis. 24). Amadeus, Winterthur 2000, ISBN 3-905049-88-0.
- Was uns kein Notentext hätte erzählen können. Zur musikalischen Bedeutung und Aussagekraft historischer Tondokumente. In Claudio Bacciagaluppi, Roman Brotbeck, Anselm Gerhard (ed.): Zwischen schöpferischer Individualität und künstlerischer Selbstverleugnung. Zur musikalischen Aufführungspraxis im 19. Jahrhundert. Edition Argus, Schliengen 2009, ISBN 978-3-931264-82-6.

== Recordings ==
- Luigi Boccherini: Sonate a violoncello solo e basso. 2CDs. Pan Classics, PC 10260, also as mp3, with Gaetano Nasillo etc.
- Francesco Antonio Bonporti: Invenzioni a violino solo. 2CDs. Harmonia Mundi, HMC 905237.38, with Chiara Banchini and Gaetano Nasillo. - Preis der Deutschen Schallplattenkritik
- Arcangelo Corelli: Sonate a violino e violone o cimbalo. op. 5. Harmonia Mundi, HMA 1951307, with Chiara Banchini, Luciano Contini and Kathy Gohl
- Arcangelo Corelli: Concerti Grossi. op. 6. 2CDs. Harmonia Mundi, HMG 501406.07, with Chiara Banchini and the Ensemble 415. - Diapason d'or
- Francesco Geminiani: 6 Sonate per violoncello e basso continuo. op. 5. first published by Symphonie, now Pan Classics, PC 10232, and also on itunes and as mp3, with Gaetano Nasillo and Tobias Bonz
- Johann Mattheson: Der brauchbare Virtuoso. 12 Kammersonaten (1717). 2 CDs. Kontrapunkt, auch als mp3, with Toke Lund Christiansen. - 1980 recording in Weekendavisen (Dk), Shortlist der 10 besten Aufnahmen des Jahres (1980) in gramophone
- Georg Muffat: Armonico Tributo. Harmonia Mundi, with Chiara Banchini and the Ensemble 415. - Diapason d'or
- Antonio Vivaldi: Sonate a tre "La Follia". Harmonia Mundi, HMG 501366, with Chiara Banchini and the Ensemble 415
- Timewave with Mikkel Nordso, Klaus Nordso and Tine Rehling, Stunt Records (Sunnymoon)
