= Michael Kapsner =

German composer, organist and conductor

Michael Kapsner (born 29 June 1961) is a German composer, organist, conductor, improvisator and music educator. He teaches at the University of Music Franz Liszt Weimar.

== Life ==
Born in Passau, Kapsner received his first organ lessons from Toni Glas in Passau. After graduating from the Gymnasium Leopoldinum (Passau), he studied in Vienna and Freiburg with the following teachers: organ with Michael Radulescu and Ludwig Doerr, piano with Hans Petermandl, composition with Friedrich Neumann, improvisation with Peter Planyavsky, conducting with Karl Österreicher and Hans-Michael Beuerle. From 1988 to 1990, he worked as a church musician in Freiburg.

In 1991, Kapsner founded an orchestra and worked as a freelance organist and conductor until 2000; between 1993 and 1999, he conducted the Freiburg Oratorio Choir. From 1994 to 2001, Kapsner was a lecturer for organ and improvisation at the Trossingen College of Music. Between 2000 and 2004, he was professor of organ and improvisation at the University of Music and Performing Arts Graz. In 2004 he moved to the University of Music Franz Liszt Weimar in the same capacity.

Kapsner is a laureate of international organ competitions, including the Bach Prize Bruges in 1985. He has been active as an organist and improviser in concerts and has participated as a juror in international competitions.
