= Elaine Comparone =

American harpsichordist (born 1943)

- Born: 1943; Lawrence, Massachusetts
- Occupation: Harpsichordist

Elaine Comparone is an American harpsichordist. Born in 1943, in Lawrence Massachusetts, she is known for playing in a standing position before a specially adapted Dowd instrument.

== Background ==
Born into a family of musicians in Lawrence, Massachusetts, Comparone began playing piano at aged four, while studying other instruments during childhood. However, while attending Brandeis University she began to learn the harpsichord and, subsequently, was awarded a Fulbright Fellowship to study under Isolde Ahlgrimm at the Vienna Academy.

Comparone made her recital debut as a Concert Artists Guild award winner in New York, in 1970, and has since been the recipient of Solo Recitalist and Recording Grants from the National Endowment for the Arts.

As founding director of Harpsichord Unlimited, a non-profit organization dedicated to stimulating interest in the harpsichord and teaching audiences about the instrument, its history, and its music, she has directed and performed an annual series of concerts.
