= Enrico Gatti =

Italian violinist (born 1955)

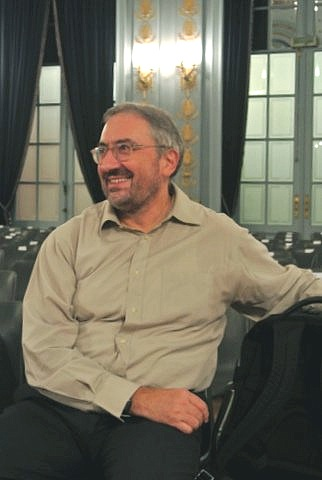
Enrico Gatti 2016

Enrico Gatti (born 1955) is an Italian violinist, known for playing Baroque music.

Gatti was born in Perugia, Italy. He graduated from the Geneva Conservatory as a student of Chiara Banchini and the Royal Conservatory of The Hague with Sigiswald Kuijken. He has been a professor of Baroque violin at several conservatories. He has played with numerous ensembles and founded the Ensemble Aurora, a quartet which plays Baroque music in the traditional style, in 1986.
