= James David Christie =

American classical organist and teacher

- Born: 1952; Wisconsin, United States
- Education: Oberlin Conservatory of Music, New England Conservatory of Music
- Known for: Concert organist, professor

James David Christie (born 1952) is an American classical organist and teacher. Until accusations of sexual misconduct emerged in August 2018, he was Chair and Professor of Organ at the Oberlin Conservatory of Music, Distinguished Artist in Residence at the College of the Holy Cross, and College Organist at Wellesley College. He has been a frequent organist with the Boston Symphony Orchestra since 1978, and has made several commercial recordings. Former employers include Boston Conservatory of Music, Massachusetts Institute of Technology, Harvard University, and Boston University.

== Early life and education ==
Christie was born in Wisconsin in 1952 and first studied organ there with Byron Blackmore for five years. In 1970 he enrolled at the Oberlin Conservatory of Music, studying with David Boe, graduating in 1975 with a B.Mus. degree. He then attended the New England Conservatory, where he earned an M.M. in 1977, and an A.D. in 1978, studying with Yuko Hayashi. Christie was awarded an honorary Doctor of Fine Arts degree from the New England School of Law, and an Outstanding Alumni Award from the New England Conservatory. In 1979 he became the first American to win the International Organ Competition of the Bruges Early Music Festival, and the first competitor to win both the First Prize and the Audience Prize.

== Professional highlights ==
Christie has performed more than 50 concert tours of Europe, Japan, and Australia, and has served on over 40 international competition juries. He has performed premiers of over 40 works. He has served regularly on the faculty of McGill University's Summer Organ Academy in Montreal, Canada. Christie has been a guest professor at the Paris Conservatory, Cracow Conservatory, Royal Conservatory of Brussels, Conservatory of Versailles, Dom Bedos Organ Academy in Bordeaux, International Summer Organ Academy in Haarlem (Netherlands), and other educational institutions. He has performed and recorded with symphony orchestras in London, Stuttgart, Vienna, Koblentz, Boston, Philadelphia, San Francisco, Seattle, and Baltimore. In 2017 he received the "International Performer of the Year" award from the American Guild of Organists (AGO). Several of his student organists have gone on to win national and international competitions.

=== Findings of misconduct ===
On August 23, 2018, The Boston Globe published an article describing decades of Christie's alleged sexual misconduct at College of the Holy Cross, soon after five former students jointly wrote to the college president, calling Christie "an imminent danger to students on your campus." As one graduate summarized the pressure for scholarship students to tolerate the misconduct: "He's the best organ teacher in America, and he could destroy your dreams." Christie was quickly suspended by Holy Cross and Oberlin, and he resigned from both colleges as they began internal investigations. He also "discontinued his services" at Wellesley, and the AGO revoked his "International Performer of the Year" award.

The Oberlin investigation concluded: "There is evidence that Mr. Christie in all likelihood grossly abused his position of trust and violated Oberlin College's Discrimination and Harassment Policy, Sexual Misconduct Policy, and professional code of conduct." The Holy Cross investigation concluded: "Mr. Christie has been found responsible for multiple violations of the College’s prohibitions on sexual harassment and misconduct."

== Selected recordings ==
- The 1985 Taylor & Boody Organ – College of the Holy Cross (JAV)
- Sweelinck: Organ Works (Naxos)
