= Michael Borgstede =

German musician

Michael Borgstede (born December 27, 1976) is a German harpsichordist and organist. He is also a journalist, being Middle East correspondent for the Frankfurter Allgemeine Sonntagszeitung. He was born at Thuine in Lower Saxony and resides in Tel Aviv.

While a student at the Royal Conservatory of The Hague, Borgstede won the Ben Weber Award and the York Early Music Competition. He has since appeared with the early-music group Musica ad Rhenum as well as a soloist.

He is a recording artist and a published author: Leben in Israel: Alltag im Ausnahmezustand. Herbig, München 2008, ISBN 978-3-7766-2553-0, on the ethnic diversity of Israeli society.
