= Anne Gallet =

Anne Gallet is a Swiss harpsichordist and musicologist.

Gallet was born in Geneva. At the age of 20 she won the first prize for virtuosity at the Conservatoire de Genève in the class of Isabelle Nef. Subsequently, she studied at the Wiener Musikakademie (Vienna), and further, under Gustav Leonhardt. A laureate of the International Competition Musica Antiqua Bruges in 1965, she went on to play at European and American festivals, solo, and accompanying Jordi Savall, Hopkinson Smith, Sigiswald Kuijken, and Philippe Huttenlocher. She obtained a master's degree in musicology at Washington University in St. Louis, where she also taught harpsichord for two years.

In reviewing the 2000 recording The Baroque Harpsichord to which Gallet contributed, Gramophone magazine praised "the delicacy of her touch".

As of 2000, she is a teacher at the Conservatoire de Genève and the Centre de Musique Ancienne Geneve.
