= Olga Pashchenko =

Russian musician (born 1986)

Olga Pashchenko Ольга Пащенко
- Born: 1986 (age 39–40); Moscow, Russia
- Genres: Classical
- Occupation: Instrumentalist
- Instruments: Harpsichord; fortepiano; pipe organ; piano
- Years active: 1995–present
- Label: Fuga Libera
- Website: www.olgapashchenko.com

Olga Pashchenko (Russian: Ольга Пащенко; born 1986) is a Russian harpsichordist, fortepianist, organist and pianist who has performed in concert halls in Moscow and other cities of Russia, Belarus, Italy, United States, Austria, Belgium, France, Germany and the Netherlands and has won several major international competitions.

== Biography ==
Pashchenko was born in Moscow and started playing the piano at the age of six. She entered the Gnessin School in Moscow at the age of seven and gave her first piano recital in New York City at the age of nine. After graduating from the Gnessin School with honors she entered the Moscow State Tchaikovsky Conservatory, where she studied with Alexei Lubimov (piano), Olga Martynova (harpsichord and fortepiano), and Alexei Shmitov (organ) and graduated in 2010. In 2011 she began studies with Richard Egarr at the Conservatorium van Amsterdam on both fortepiano and harpsichord and she graduated in 2013 and 2014 respectively, with the highest honors on both instruments (excellent, cum laude).

She has performed at festivals and venues around Europe, including the Festival Oude Muziek in the Netherlands, the Beethoven-Haus in Germany, Zaubersee Russian Music Festival in Switzerland, Leipziger Chopin-Tage and Seiler Festival in Germany, Sankt Gallen Festival in Austria, International Piano Festival Saint Petersburg and concert series of modern music “Skazochnye stranstviya” Moscow in Russia, Accademia del Ricercare, Soli Deo Gloria Festival, and the Mostra Fortepiano Bergamo in Italy.

Her playing has been described as "not only technical, but also musically of the highest quality", "imaginative and haunting" and as "a pianistic thoroughbred."

Her debut CD, Transitions, with music by Dussek, Beethoven, and Mendelssohn was released in 2013 by the Belgian publisher Outhere on the label Fuga Libera, which got selected as the recording of the month on MusicWeb and got a ffff (highest award) from the French magazine Télérama. Her second CD, featuring sonatas and variations by Beethoven, was recorded in Paris in May 2014, and released later that year, on the Alpha label.

== Prizes ==
Her awards include:

- 2014 Second Prize and Audience Prize of the International Bach Competition in Leipzig
- 2013 First Prize of the Circulo Bach Competition in Madrid
- 2012 First Prize and Critic’s Jury Prize of the International Fortepiano Competition Premio Ferrari in Rovereto (Italy)
- 2012 Second Prize and Audience Prize of the International Competition Musica Antiqua Brugges on the harpsichord
- 2012 First Prize and Special Prize of the Chopin Society at the International Hans von Bülow Piano Competition in Meiningen (Germany)
- 2011 Winner of the First International Fortepiano Competition Schloss Kremsegg
- 2010 Second Prize of the International Competition Musica Antiqua Brugges on the fortepiano
