= Glen Wilson (harpsichordist) =

Glen Wilson (born March 29, 1952) is an American-born Dutch harpsichordist, fortepianist, clavichordist and organist.

== Biography and career ==
Glen Wilson studied at the Juilliard School with Albert Fuller, then moved to the Netherlands, where he studied with Gustav Leonhardt. In 1980, he won all three categories of the Bruges International Competition. He worked with the Netherlands Chamber Orchestra, then resigned in 1982 to pursue a career as a soloist. In 1988, he moved to Bavaria, taking a teaching post at the Hochschule für Musik Würzburg.

Wilson worked with the Leonhardt Consort, Concentus Musicus Wien, La Petite Bande, and the Royal Concertgebouw Orchestra as continuo player, and was harpsichordist of choice with the Netherlands Opera for 20 years. He assisted Nicholas Harnoncourt with the latter's cycle of Mozart-da Ponte, which were later recorded for Teldec. Wilson's debut as conductor occurred in 1990, with the Netherlands Opera's production of Monteverdi's Il ritorno d'Ulisse in Patria.

Wilson has performed with Gustav Leonhardt, Emma Kirkby, Roberta Alexander, René Jacobs, Alice Harnoncourt, Max van Egmond, Wieland Kuijken, Michael Chance, and Mieneke van der Velden, and founded the Amsterdam Fortepiano Trio with Lucy van Dael and Wouter Möller.

Wilson has made many recordings, including Bach's Well-Tempered Clavier, for Teldec, as part of their Bach 2000 complete edition; he contributed to a complete recording of Sweelinck's keyboard works; and he recorded a selection of works by Charles and Louis Couperin for the Naxos label, after editing an edition of the Couperins' Unmeasured Preludes. He has recorded many other renaissance and baroque works, including composers such as Buxtehude, Andrea Gabrieli, Gaspard le Roux, Giles Farnaby, Scarlatti, Cabezón, Byrd, Cavazzoni, and others.

Glen Wilson is married to fellow harpsichordist Naoko Akutagawa.
