= Gilbert Rowland =

Gilbert Rowland (born 1946 in Glasgow, Scotland) is a Scottish harpsichordist. His father was second in command to the Viceroy of India during the days of the British Raj. He studied at the Royal College of Music, under Millicent Silver, and made his debut while still a student at Fenton House in Britain. He has often been heard on the BBC, Radio 3, Capital Radio and abroad on PBS affiliated stations and other broadcasts across the world, as well as concerts.

The instrument Rowland usually plays is in the late 18th century French style, built in the manner of Pascal Taskin, with a five octave compass of FF to g.

In 1975, Rowland established Keyboard Records for the sole purpose of recording all Domenico Scarlatti's 555 harpsichord sonatas. He has also recorded the harpsichord works of Rameau, the complete sonatas of Soler and the 12 suites (1714) of Mattheson. He has recorded for Nimbus, Naxos and Divine Art Records. Rowland has appeared in recordings and in concert with the Nashville Symphony Orchestra.
