= Claire Chevallier =

Franco-Belgian pianist

- Born: 1969 (age 56–57)
- Education: Royal Conservatory of Brussels; Conservatoires of Nancy and Strasbourg
- Occupation: pianist
- Known for: specializes in the fortepiano
- Notable work: built up a collection of Érard [fr] pianos dating (1842 to 1920)

Claire Chevallier (born in 1969) is a Franco-Belgian pianist who specializes in the fortepiano.

== Biography ==
Chevallier studied piano at the Conservatoires of Nancy and Strasbourg (class of Hélène Boschi) then with Bruno Rigutto in Paris. She then continued her training at the Royal Conservatory of Brussels with Jean-Claude Vanden Eynden and Guy Van Waas. She received a First Prize for piano and chamber music.

It was during a masterclass given by Jos van Immerseel that she was fascinated by the fortepiano and therefore interested, as musician and researcher, in the historical contexts of the instruments and their technical evolution.

Since 2004 she has been teaching the fortepiano at the Royal Conservatory of Brussels. Since 2007, she has been a member of the Jury of the International Competition of fortepiano organized by the Festival Musica Antiqua of Bruges. She is also a member of the jury of the 1st Frédéric Chopin International Competition on period instruments.

Chevallier has built up a collection of Érard pianos dating from the period 1842 to 1920.

== Recordings ==
Claire Chevallier particular recorded on Erard piano vintage works for two pianos by Franck, Saint-Saens and Francis Poulenc (with Jos van Immerseel). She has also recorded Moussorgski's Pictures at an Exhibition and Ravel's Piano Concerto for the Left Hand (with the orchestra Anima Eterna from Bruges). It is also on an Érard piano that she plays both Légendes de Saint François by Liszt recorded on the album Fever (La dolce volta/Harmonia Mundi).
