= Hans-Martin Linde =

German conductor, composer and flute and recorder player

Hans-Martin Linde (born 24 May 1930 in Werne, Germany) is a German conductor, composer, and noted virtuoso flute and recorder player of (mainly) baroque and early music. He was educated at the Hochschule für Musik Freiburg where he studied the flute with Gustav Scheck and conducting with Konrad Lechner from 1947 through 1951. He began his career as solo flautist of the Cappella Coloniensis des WDR. In 1957 he joined the faculty of the Schola Cantorum Basiliensis where he served as conductor of various school ensembles, both choral and instrumental. He has performed as a guest solo concert flautist and recordist and worked as a guest conductor with professional orchestras throughout Europe. He also worked as an opera conductor in European theaters.

He authored a number of original and highly instructive books on the flute and recorder respectively.

- Recorder Player Handbook (Handbuch des Blockflötenspiels, 1997)
- Complete F recorder method
- Complete C recorder method
- Studies in the French clef for recorder
- History of fipple-flutes

== Partial list of works ==
- Amarilli mia bella, recorder solo
- Music for a bird, Alto recorder solo
- Sonate in d (1961), Alto recorder and piano
- Sonata, Alto recorder and organ
- Kinder-Suite, 3 recorders
- Music for two, recorder, guitar
- Musica da camera, recorder, guitar
- Trio, recorders
- Trio, Alto recorder, flute and harpsichord (piano)
- Four caprices, unaccompanied alto recorder or flute
- Miniatures, soprano recorder solo
- Jazzy tunes, recorder, piano
- Five studies, Alto recorder, piano
- Three Skizzen Alto recorder, violin and piano (harpsichord)
- Anspielungen, flute
- Concerto, recorder (alto, sopranoino and bass) and string orchestra
- Die Zahl ist nichts : Madrigal, mixed choir
- Fairy Tales, soprano, alto, tenor and bass recorder changing
- Fantasias and Scherzi, Alto recorder
- Musical Paintings, Alto recorder and piano
- Notabene, harpsichord
- Reminiscences, 4 recorders (ATTB)
- Sechs Eichendorff-Gesänge, mixed choir
- Serenade, soprano- or tenor recorder
- Serenata a tre, 3 recorders (SAT), guitar and cello (viola da gamba)
- Suite, 4 recorders (SATB)
- Una Follia nuova, Alto recorder
- Zwiegespräche, recorder (alto recorder, tenor recorder) and cello

He then set up the Linde Consort (a baroque orchestra) and has made numerous recordings.
