= Xavier Darasse =

French organist and composer

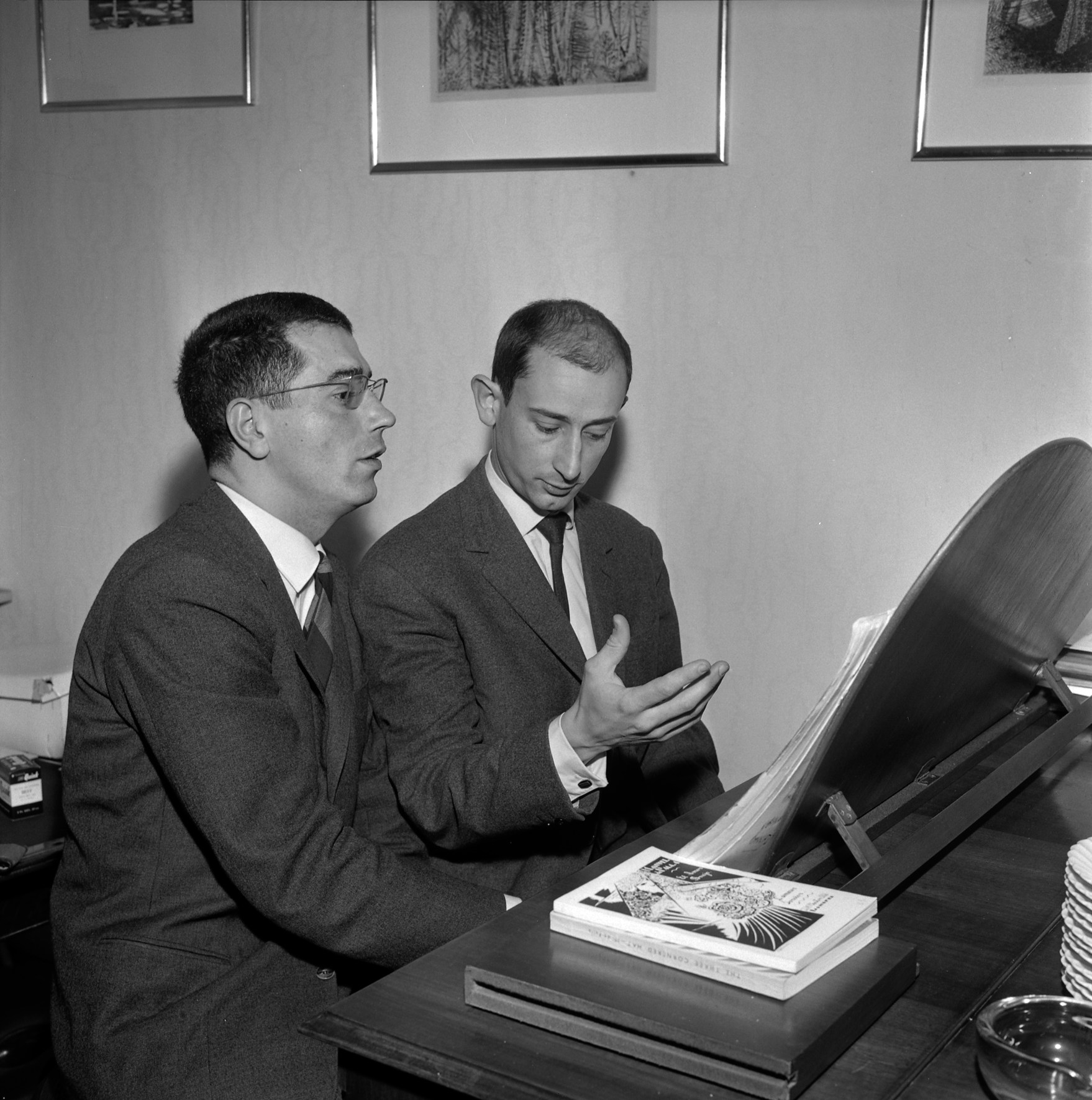
Xavier Darasse (right) giving a piano lesson, 10 December 1965

François Xavier Darasse (3 September 1934 – 24 November 1992) was a French organist, musicologist, composer, and pedagogue. The Toulouse les Orgues (Organs of Toulouse) festival organise the International Xavier Darasse Organ Competition every three years in his honour.

He was titular organist of the Basilica of Saint-Sernin in his hometown, Toulouse.

== Life ==
Darasse was born in Toulouse (Haute-Garonne) into a family of musicians (his mother, Renée-Marie Darasse-Laroyenne, was an organist) in 1964 and is a namesake of Saint Francis Xavier. He was a student of Maurice Duruflé, Rolande Falcinelli, Jean Rivier and Olivier Messiaen at the Conservatoire de Paris. In parallel with his career as a concert organist, he was a professor at the Conservatoire de Toulouse and then at the Conservatoire de Lyon, the organ class of the latter being "relocated" to Toulouse. His repertoire extended from early music to contemporary repertoire.

In 1976, after a serious road accident, during which he lost his right arm (which he was successfully transplanted without being able to regain his motor skills), he had to put an end to his career as a concert performer. He then devoted himself to teaching the organ, as well as composition, with among other things "Instants éclatés" in 1983 for the Orchestre national du Capitole de Toulouse.

He was appointed director of the Conservatoire de Paris in 1991, succeeding Alain Louvier.

He died prematurely of cancer in 1992 in Toulouse, leaving an opera adapted from Oscar Wilde's the Picture of Dorian Gray unfinished. Marc-Olivier Dupin succeeded him as the director of the Conservatoire de Paris and Michel Bouvard succeeded him as organist of Saint-Sernin. In his memory, a Toulousain street was renamed to Rue Xavier Darasse.

== Musical ideas ==
Darasse carried and invented an organological perspective different from that of his contemporaries. He favored the breath (continuous or interrupted), the articulated discourse (the importance of touch and digital articulation), and registers and colours (the heritage of his professor of musical analysis, Olivier Messiaen).

During his short career, Darasse was one of the most eclectic organists of his generation, sensitive as much to early music, whose mysteries he knew, as to contemporary organ music, of which he was one of the great promoters. On the Robert Boisseau organ of the Église Notre-Dame de Royan, he recorded one of the first disks of "contemporary" organ music in the very late 1960s (works by Luis de Pablo and himself). Darasse had close friendships with Antoine Tisné and Iannis Xenakis, and he gave the French and German premieres of the latter's only organ work Gmeeoorh (1974).

== Compositions ==
=== Organ ===
- Organum I for organ (1970), commission of the Festival de Royan
- Organum II for organ (1978), commission of the CNSM de Paris
- Organum III for organ (1979), commande pour le concours d’orgue de Chartres
- Organum IV for organ and three percussions (1981)
- Organum V for organ (1983), State commission
- Organum VI for organ (1986), a series of 6 short and easy pieces for a classical organ
- Organum VII for soprano and organ (1989), for the Saint-Bertrand-de-Comminges festival
- Organum VIII for organ and brass quintet (1972), commission of the festival de Metz, in memoriam Jean-Pierre Guézec
- Pedal-Exercitium for organ (1988) commission of the Éditions Universal.

=== Choral ===
- Notre Père, in the style of the Messe pour Montserrat for four mixed voices (soprano, alto, tenor, bass)

=== Opera ===
- The Picture of Dorian Gray (1990-1992), libretto by Oscar Wilde - unfinished upon death
