= Jory Vinikour =

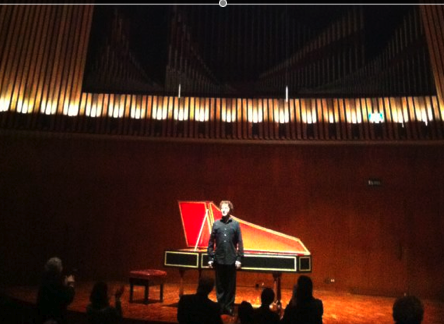
Jory Vinikour

Jory Vinikour (born May 12, 1963 in Chicago) is an American born harpsichordist. He has been living in Paris since 1990, where he studied on a scholarship from the Fulbright U.S. Student Program with Huguette Dreyfus and Kenneth Gilbert.

Vinikour has appeared as soloist throughout Europe and the United States, as well as in Asia and South America. Notable appearances include Carnegie (Weill) Recital Hall, Music Before 1800 (New York), Baldwin-Wallace Bach Festival, and many others. His concerto repertoire ranges from Bach to Nyman, and he regularly performs modern harpsichord concertos, such as the Petite Symphonie Concertante by Frank Martin, and the Harpsichord Concerto by the same composer.

He has accompanied Swedish mezzo-soprano Anne Sofie von Otter in recitals and, with lutenist Jakob Lindberg, they have recorded a programme of English and Italian music of the 17th century entitled "Music for a While".

In recent seasons, Vinikour has appeared as conductor with the Hong Kong Philharmonic Orchestra, the Korean Chamber Orchestra, the Los Angeles Chamber Orchestra, MusicAeterna, Juilliard415, and the Musica Angelica Baroque Orchestra, always leading from the harpsichord.

== Recordings ==
He has recorded Bach's Goldberg Variations in 2000, Delos Productions and seven harpsichord toccatas (BWV 910-916) in 1999. He performs (on a restored Pleyel harpsichord) in a recording of Frank Martin's Petite symphonie concertante with the Lausanne Chamber Orchestra under the direction of Armin Jordan. He recorded of the four harpsichord suites of Bernard de Bury in 2006. His recording of the 1720 Suites of George Frideric Handel was released 2008.

In 2012, Jory Vinikour's recording of the Complete Harpsichord Works of Jean-Philippe Rameau was nominated for a Grammy Award in the category of Best Classical Instrumental Solo recording, a unique achievement for a harpsichord recording. Vinikour's recording of contemporary American compositions for harpsichord, Toccatas, featuring works by Mel Powell, Henry Cowell, Ned Rorem, Robert Muczynski, Harold Meltzer and others has been nominated in the same category in December, 2014.

Vinikour has taught harpsichord master-classes at the Austrian Baroque Academy (Gmunden), the Moscow Conservatory, the Gnessin State Musical College, the European Academy in Montepulciano, and the Rocky Ridge Music Center(Colorado). John von Rhein of the Chicago Tribune has named Vinikour three times on his ten-best classical recording list : in 1999 (Bach's Toccatas), in 2002 (Goldberg Variations) and in 2012 (Rameau's Complete Harpsichord Works).

== Merits and awards ==
- 1987 – Paris Harpsichord Competition – Prize for contemporary music
- 1993 – First International Harpsichord Competition of Warsaw – 1st prize
- 1994 – Prague Spring Competition – 1st prize, and overall prize of Festival
