= Lionel Rogg =

Swiss organist, composer and teacher

Lionel Rogg (born Geneva, April 21 1936) is a Swiss organist, composer and teacher of musical theory. He is best known for performing the music of Johann Sebastian Bach, whose complete organ works he has recorded three times.

At 15, Rogg took charge of the Geneva St Boniface organ. Later, at the Conservatoire de Musique de Genève, he studied under Pierre Segond (a pupil of Marcel Dupré). He obtained degrees in harmony, counterpoint and fugue, and won scholarships, organ and piano prizes, and a First Prize for sight-reading. In 1959 he won second prize for organ at the ARD International Music Competition in Munich. He also studied with the pianist Nikita Magaloff.

After three years of study, in 1961 he gave a series of ten recitals of Bach's complete organ works at the Victoria Hall in Geneva, followed by organ recitals in France, Spain, Belgium, Holland, Switzerland, and in England at St Albans and at the Royal Festival Hall in London. He gave two recitals devoted to Bach's Orgelbüchlein at the 1962 International Festival of Montreux, and participated in festivals and organ weeks at Bayreuth and Nuremberg.

Soon after his Geneva recitals, Rogg was invited to record the complete organ works of Bach on the new mechanical-action, electro-pneumatic registration 67-stop organ built in the Zurich Grossmunster built by the Swiss firm Metzler & Sohne Orgelbau in 1958-1960. This programme was begun in September 1961 and completed in September 1964, in ten sessions of three evenings each. The recording was made by the technical service of Radio Zurich using three microphones, two for the Positifs and one for the Great and Pedals. They were processed and mastered by Philips Phonographische Industrie, Baarn. The recordings were issued on Bach Recordings, a label of Oryx Recordings Limited.

Rogg also recorded the complete Bach organ works for Harmonia Mundi, first released in 1970 and re-released on CD in 1992 and 2000, on the Silbermann organ in Arlesheim. This instrument was built by Johann Andreas, son of Andreas Silbermann, in 1761, and restored by Metzler in 1959-1962.

His third recording of the complete Bach organ works, for the French label "La Voix De Son Maître", was recorded between April 1975 and February 1976 on 5 different instruments : the Andersen Organs at Notre-Sauveur Church, Copenhagen, and Sorø Monastery; and the Metzler Organs of Saint-Pierre Cathedral, Geneva, the Netstal Reformed Church (Glarus), and the Muri Klosterkirche.

In addition to organ recitals, Rogg composed music, played the harpsichord and made recordings with chamber groups. He made organ, harpsichord and piano recordings for the Swiss Broadcasting Company, including a performance of the 6 Trio Sonatas played on his own Wittmayer pedal harpsichord. Lionel Rogg wrote a manual on counterpoint, and returned to the Conservatoire de Musique de Genève to work as a professor of counterpoint and fugue. His recording of Renaissance Dances (in which he performed on positive organ and conducted an ensemble of Renaissance instruments in various dances and other works) was awarded a Grand Prix du Disque and an Edison Award, and was reissued on Odyssey Records in the mid 1970s.

Rogg's 1969 recording of J S Bach's Die Kunst der Fuge, BWV 1080, issued on HMV CSD 3666-3667, includes a form of the Contrapunctus XIV with Rogg's own conjectural completion, in addition to the performance of the original (incomplete) Fugue. This performance was given on the organ of St Peter's Cathedral, Geneva, and in Santa Maria della Mercede, Rome, among others.

== Sources ==
- Sleeve insert, J S Bach: Complete Organ Works (Oryx Records, Walton on Thames, 1966).
