= Robert Veyron-Lacroix =

French musician (1922–1991)

Robert Veyron-Lacroix (13 December 1922 in Paris – 2 April 1991 in Garches (Hauts-de-Seine)) was a French harpsichordist and pianist whose post-war career was defined by his musical partnership with the celebrated French flautist Jean-Pierre Rampal.

== Early life ==
He was the son of an industrialist and revealed his talent at an early age. He studied with Marcel Samuel-Rousseau and Yves Nat at the Conservatoire de Paris, winning first prizes for piano, harpsichord, harmony, counterpoint, accompaniment, solfeggio, and theory.

== Career ==
He made his French Radio debut in 1949 and pursued a career as a soloist, both in chamber music, and with orchestras.

He was a regular performer at numerous festivals in Europe and toured Africa, America, and the Far East.

Veyron-Lacroix's technical assurance and sensitive musicianship helped to create a rewarding partnership in the immediate post-war years with Jean-Pierre Rampal. From their first major public recital together—at the Salle Gaveau in Paris in 1949, at a time when whole concerts for flute and piano were unfashionable—they went on to perform together around the world for over thirty years and won many awards for their recordings. In the early 1980s, owing to ill-health, Veyron-Lacroix retired from their partnership, and Rampal forged a new duo with American pianist John Steele Ritter.

He created many contemporary works, including the Concerto pour clavecin et orchestra by Jean Françaix, concertos by Jean-Michel Damase and Darius Milhaud, a sonata for flute and piano by André Jolivet, and pieces by Maurice Ohana, Jacques Charpentier and Tony Aubin.

== Teaching ==
He taught at the Schola Cantorum in Paris starting in 1956, and at the Académie internationale d'été de Nice starting in 1959 and was a professor at the Paris Conservatoire from 1967 to 1988. In 1955 he published a book entitled Recherche de musique ancienne.

== Recordings and awards ==
Veyron-Lacroix's recordings include Bach keyboard music, Haydn's keyboard concertos, keyboard sonatas by Cimarosa, the Falla harpsichord concerto, Poulenc's Concert champêtre and the Roussel Divertissement Op.6. His solo recordings won the Grand Prix du Disque in 1954, 1955, 1960, 1964, and 1965.
