= Michael Radulescu =

Romanian-German composer (1943–2023)

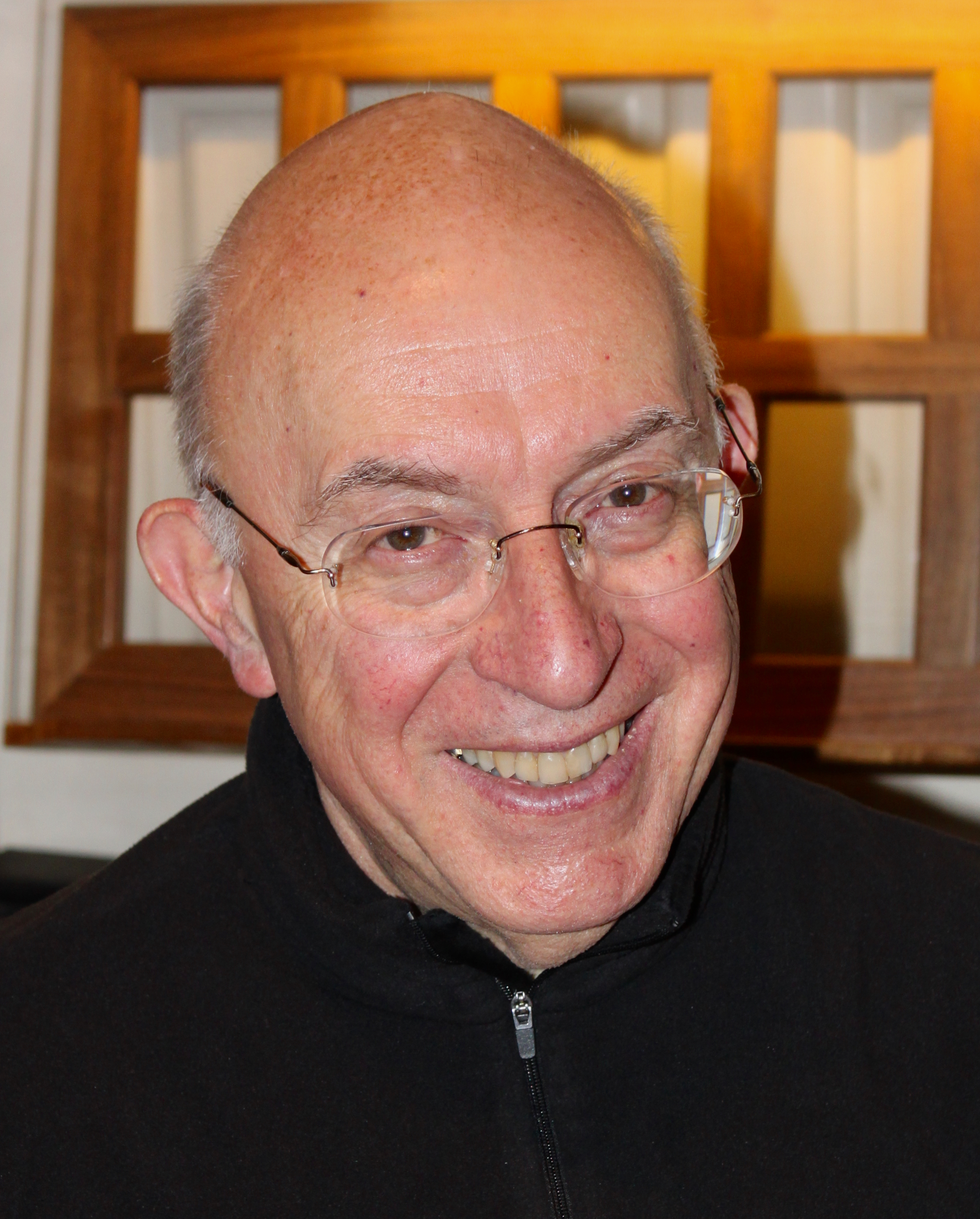
Radulescu in 2014

Michael Radulescu (19 June 1943 – 23 December 2023) was a Romanian-German composer, organist, and professor.

Radulescu was born to a Romanian father and a German mother. He studied with Anton Heiller and Hans Swarowsky at the University of Music and Performing Arts in Vienna, Austria. Radulescu died on 23 December 2023, at the age of 80.
