= Colin Tilney =

English musician (1933–2024)

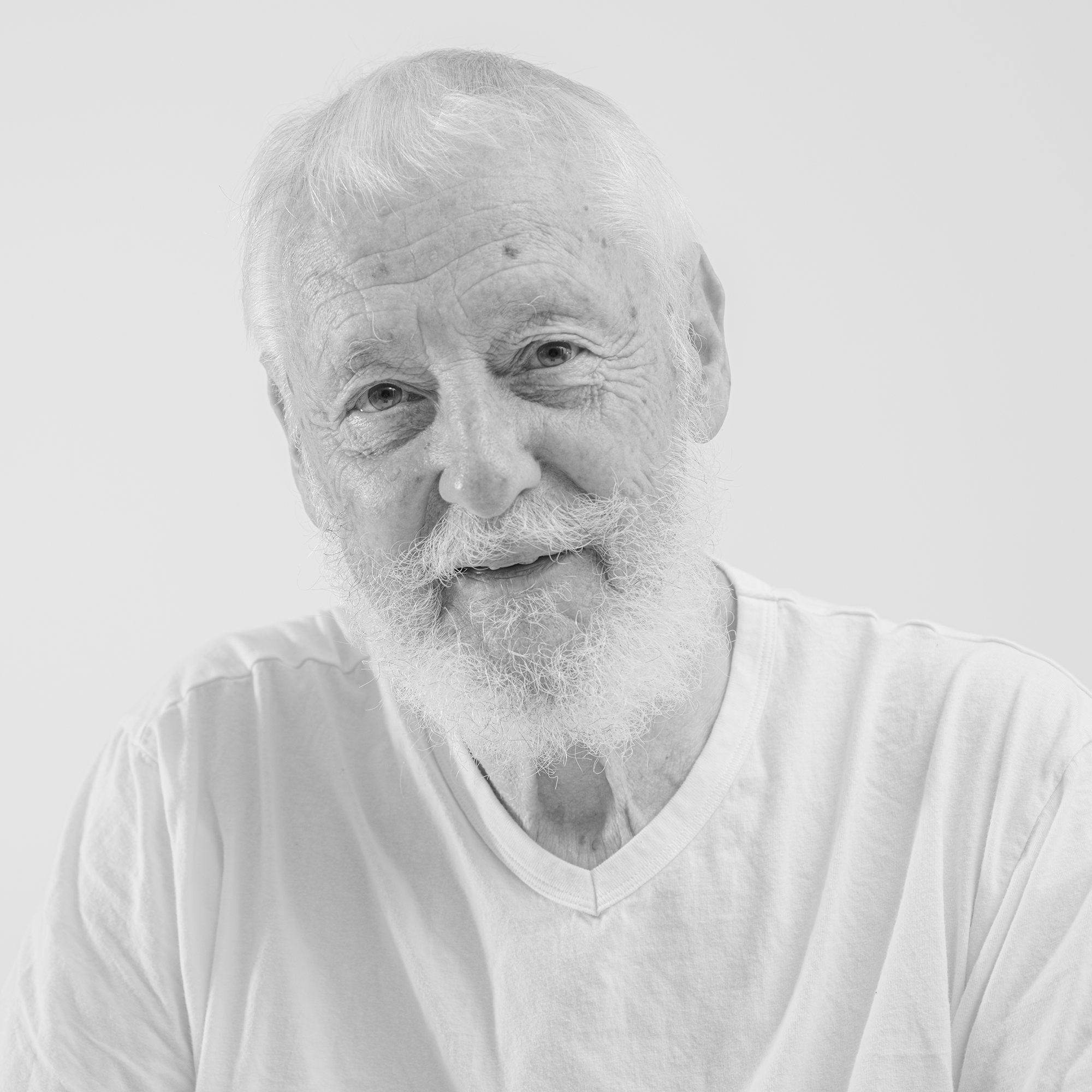
Colin Tilney in 2017

Colin Graham Tilney (31 October 1933 – 17 December 2024) was a British-Canadian harpsichordist, fortepianist and teacher.

He is well known for his historically-informed approach to performance practice, performing on original or copied instruments, largely using contemporary scores.

== Education and personal life ==
Colin Graham Tilney was born in Maida Vale, London on 31 October 1933, the son of Cdr George Tilney RN and his wife Eileen (née Graham). He grew up in Haslemere, Surrey.

He was educated at Charterhouse School. After national service, when he learnt Russian, he went in 1954 to King’s College, Cambridge. He took a degree in modern languages and music, followed by a MusB.

Tilney married Emira Samia Jazairy, an Algerian princess working as a nurse in London. They had a daughter Lucy. That marriage ended in divorce. He married Dr Hilary Jones in 1968 and had another daughter Beatrice, known as Bee, who predeceased him in 2023. Tilney and Jones also divorced and in 1979 he moved to Toronto, Ontario, Canada, to live with a new partner, William Emigh, an English teacher, whom he married in 2008. Emigh died in November 2022.

Tilney died in Victoria, British Columbia, Canada on 17 December 2024, aged 91.

== Professional life ==
Tilney studied harpsichord with Mary Potts and became a student of Gustav Leonhardt. He first worked as a piano accompanist at Sadler's Wells Theatre and the New Opera Company, but soon focused his energies on teaching and performing on early keyboard instruments. In 1964 he was the harpsichordist under the direction of Igor Stravinsky for the second Columbia recording of The Rake's Progress.

== Life and work in Canada ==
In 1979 Tilney moved to Canada and settled in Toronto, where he continued to teach privately and at the Royal Conservatory of Music. He performed with Tafelmusik Baroque Orchestra and the Toronto Consort, as well as touring in Asia, Australia, Great Britain and elsewhere in Europe. In 1985 he formed the chamber ensemble Les Coucous Bénévoles, which regularly commissions new music by Canadian composers. He taught for several seasons at the Dartington International Summer School in Totnes, England. He has been recorded for radio broadcast by the BBC and CBC, which issued CDs of his performances. In 2002 Tilney moved to Victoria, British Columbia, where he continued to teach and perform.

Tilney died on 17 December 2024, at the age of 91.

== Works ==
Tilney's contributions to literature include The Art of the Unmeasured Prelude: France 1660 to 1720 (Schott's, London, 1991), and previously unpublished harpsichord music by Antoine Forqueray (Heugel, 1970).

Tilney has a long discography of harpsichord and fortepiano performances from labels including Dorian, Deutsche Harmonia Mundi, L'Oiseau-Lyre/Decca, EMI Classics, Nonesuch, Vangard, DoReMi, Archiv Produktion/Deutsche Grammophon and several others.

== Sources ==
- Grant-Evans, Susan. 'A portrait of Colin Tilney,' Continuo, 10 November 1983
