= Lorenzo Ghielmi =

Italian organist and harpsichordist

Lorenzo Ghielmi (born 1 September 1959 in Milan) is an Italian organist and harpsichordist.

He teaches old music at the Accademia Internazionale della Musica in Milan and at the "Schola Cantorum Basiliensis" in Basel. He was professor in Trossingen and at the Hochschule für Musik in Lübeck too. Ghielmi also played with Ensemble Il Giardino Armonico (in the first recordings). Ghielmi combines his concert activities with a Musicology. He has published works by Girolamo Frescobaldi.
