= Christiane Jaccottet =

Swiss harpsichordist

Christiane Jaccottet (born Christiane Wachsmuth, Lausanne, Switzerland 18 May 1937; died Rivaz, 26 October 1999) was a Swiss harpsichordist who recorded the works of many composers including Johann Sebastian Bach.

== Personal life ==
She was married to Pierre Jaccottet.
