= Jos Van Immerseel =

Belgian harpsichordist, pianist and conductor

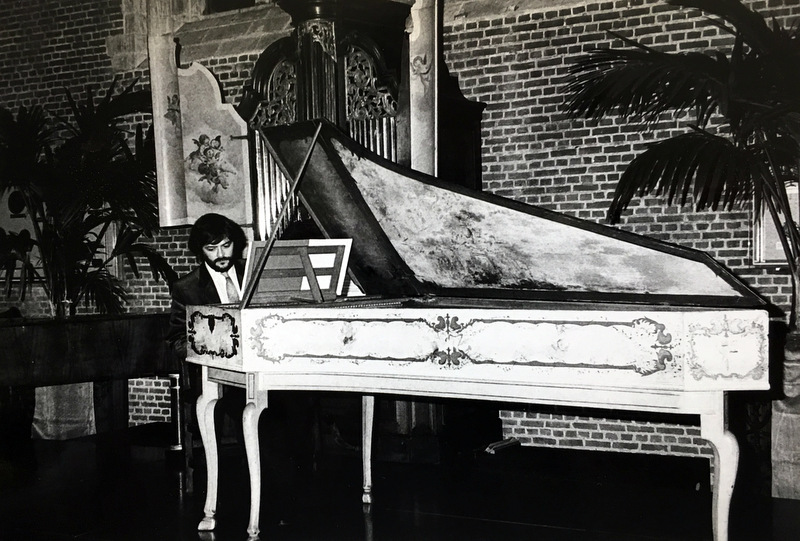
- Van Immerseel playing harpsichord in 1974
- Born: 9 November 1945 (age 80); Antwerp, Belgium
- Occupations: Harpsichordist; Pianist; Conductor

Jos Van Immerseel (born 9 November 1945) is a Belgian harpsichordist, pianist and conductor.

Van Immerseel studied organ, piano and harpsichord at the Royal Conservatoire Antwerp under Flor Peeters, Eugène Traey and harpsichordist and musicologist Kenneth Gilbert. He created the Collegium Musicum there, developing his interest in Renaissance and Baroque music, later expanding his activities to include the Classical and early Romantic eras. He is now in demand as a fortepianist in concert halls across Europe, where he is known for his refined sensitivity to the rhetorical aspects of music and for his skills in improvisation. (His cadenzas were singled out in reviews of his Beethoven concerto recordings.) Over the years, he has acquired a unique collection of period keyboard instruments, which travel with him for concerts and CD recordings.

In 1977, he attracted international attention when he conducted Monteverdi's L'Orfeo in the former Royal Flemish Opera House in Antwerp. This series of 18 performances established a new standard which remains to this day.

From 1980 to 1985, he was the artistic director of the Sweelinck Conservatory of Amsterdam.

In 1987 Van Immerseel established the "period instrument" ensemble Anima Eterna, which he continues to lead. This ensemble has become well-known and achieved a world-wide reputation particularly for the CD series of Mozart's complete piano concerti (with van Immerseel as soloist and conductor).

During 1999 they toured Europe with performances of Beethoven symphonies.

In addition to his concertising, Van Immerseel is professor at the Royal Conservatoire Antwerp, where he uses historical instruments from the nearby Vleeshuis Museum to give masterclasses. He has also taught at the Sweelinck Conservatorium in Amsterdam and the Conservatoire National Supérieur in Paris, as well as given masterclasses at festivals in La Roque-d'Anthéron, Utrecht, Sopron and Ancona.

Van Immerseel appears on Sony Classical's Vivarte imprint as a solo performer, as a soloist with Tafelmusik and as a participant in chamber music. Among his partners were: Midori Seiler (violin), Claire Chevallier (piano duo), Lisa Shklyaver (clarinet), Thomas Bauer (baritone), Yeree Suh (soprano), and Chouchane Siranossian (violin).

Since winning first prize at the inaugural Paris International Harpsichord Competition in 1973, Jos Van Immerseel has established an international career as a fortepianist and conductor specializing in music of the Baroque and Classical eras. Accomplished on the organ and piano as well as harpsichord and fortepiano, Van Immerseel has in particular gained a reputation for his performances of Mozart, Beethoven and Schubert on Sony Classical. Most recently he has appeared on Vivarte with Anner Bylsma in performances of Beethoven's complete cello sonatas (S2K 60761) and with L'Archibudelli in performances of Schubert's Trout Quintet and Arpeggione Sonata (SK 63361). His cycle of Beethoven Piano concertos with Tafelmusik and Bruno Weil (Nos. 1 and 2: SK 68250; Nos. 3 and 4: SK 62824; No. 5: SK 63365) elicited praise for his stylistic sensitivity and his musical sensibility. His recording of Mozart's late piano works, Mozart: The Vienna Years (S2K 62879), prompted Classic CD to write that Van Immerseel is "among the most winning and authoritative champions of the fortepiano".

Since 2002 he has been artistic director of the Collection Anima Eterna for the Parisian label Zig-Zag Territories.

In 2010, the city of Bremen awarded him the Prize of the Musikfest Bremen for his career.
