= Scott Ross (harpsichordist) =

American-born harpsichordist

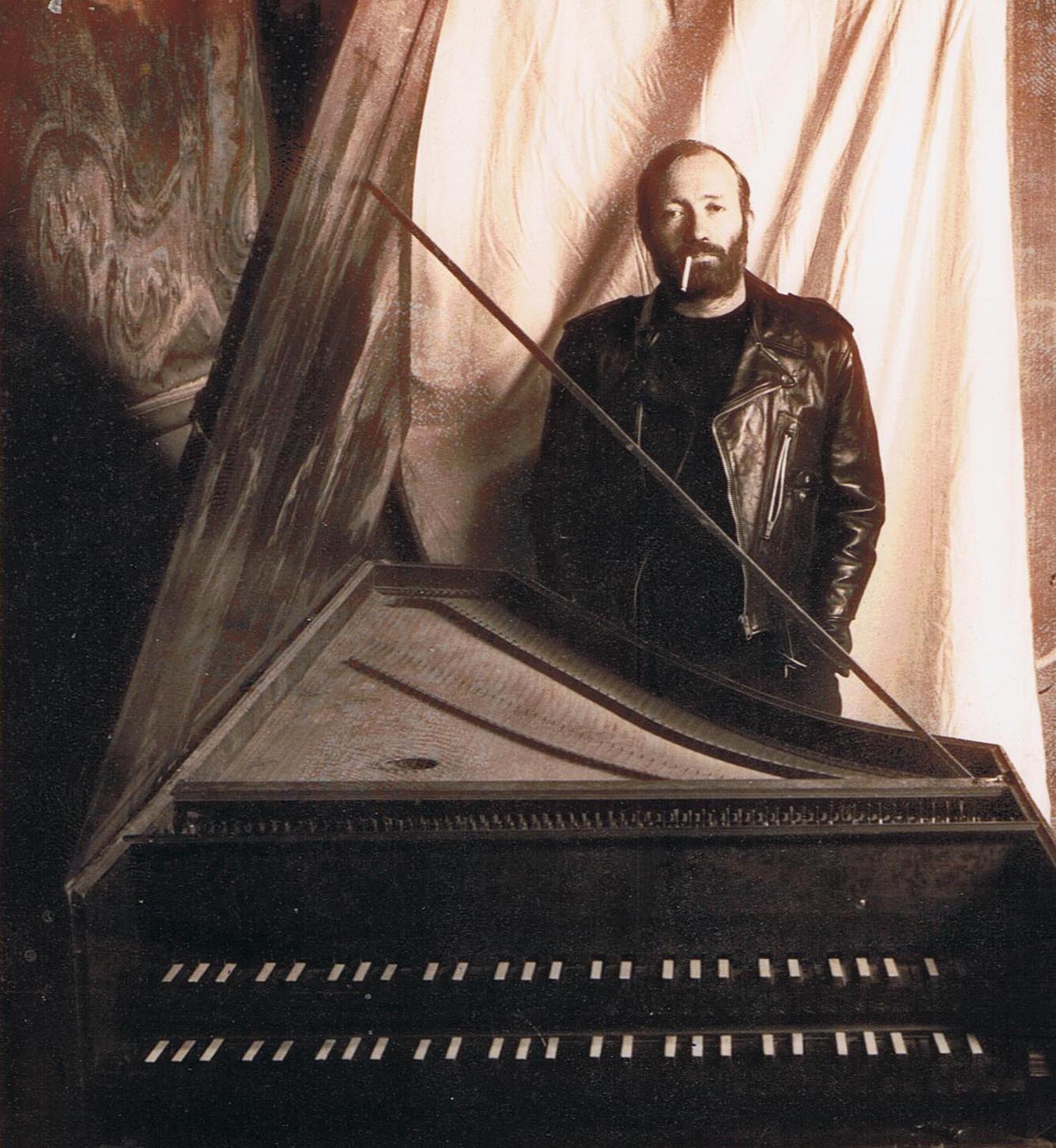
Ross in 1985

Scott Ross (March 1, 1951 – June 13, 1989) was a United States-born harpsichordist who lived in France and Canada for many years. His recordings include the first complete recording by a single performer of the 555 harpsichord sonatas of Domenico Scarlatti.

== Early life and education ==
Scott Stonebreaker Ross was born in Pittsburgh, Pennsylvania to newspaper journalist James Ross and Sarah Madeline Howe. He was nearly crippled by a severe scoliosis that kept him in a corset for much of his early life.

He studied piano and organ in Pittsburgh. Following the death of his father, he moved to France with his mother in 1964. His mother and brother soon returned to the US, but Scott remained in the country, living independently from the age of 13. He studied harpsichord at the Conservatoire de Nice, and during this period he was invited by Simone Demangel, the owner of the chateau in the village of Assas, near Montpellier, to give harpsichord lessons as a live-in tutor. After completing his studies at Nice, he enrolled at the Conservatoire de Paris. Ross also took classes at the Royal Conservatoire of Antwerp from Kenneth Gilbert. On his 19th birthday, Ross's mother committed suicide.

== Career ==
Ross then began a teaching career at the School of Music, Université Laval, Quebec. While there, he made award-winning recordings of the complete Pièces de Clavecin by Rameau and also recorded the complete keyboard works of François Couperin. Ross dressed in similar fashion to his students (even in performance), and his 'granny' spectacles appeared to align him more with the popular music icon John Lennon than the authentic performance scholar Gustav Leonhardt. At Université Laval that was attended by the university chancellor and the French Consul General, he wore jeans and a red lumberjack shirt. Self-effacing to a fault, he explained, "I started the Goldbergs 'cause I quit smoking and, to keep one's fingers busy, it's better than knitting".

A passionate collector of orchids, his other hobbies included volcanology, mineralogy, and mycology. His keyboard interests were similarly wide-ranging, extending beyond the harpsichord to the music of Frédéric Chopin, Claude Debussy and Maurice Ravel that he performed on the piano, and he also accompanied Schubert lieder. He loved the music of Brian Eno and Philip Glass, and was a fan of the punk performance artist Nina Hagen. Comparisons which might be drawn between Ross and the Canadian pianist Glenn Gould due to their common love of Baroque music and their unconventional approaches. These comparisons are put into a fuller context by comments from Ross in a documentary film made toward the end of his life:

When I hear nutcases like Glenn Gould who do: [plays staccato version of J.S. Bach's Partita no. 1, BWV 825, Allemande], I say he understood nothing of Bach's music! I've listened carefully to his records: he didn't understand. He was very brilliant; I respect him up to a certain point. For me, the fact that an artist doesn't appear in public poses a problem. But at least he was a guy with the courage not to do things like other people. All the same, he was wide off the mark, so wide off the mark that you'd need a 747 to bring him back. I'm hard on Glenn Gould. Well, he's dead now, so I won't attack a colleague.

In 1983 Ross took an indefinite sabbatical from Laval, embarking on several recordings for the French label Erato, including the Eight Great Suites of George Frideric Handel, Bach's 6 Partitas, and keyboard works by Jean-Henri d'Anglebert. (He also made two albums for EMI, including his last consisting of Girolamo Frescobaldi works.)

He returned to France, renting a small house in Assas and another in Paris. In 1984 he signed a five-year recording contract with Erato, but also experienced his first premonition of the illness that would later kill him.

The main fruit of his new contract was the daunting task of recording the complete keyboard sonatas (555 in total) of Domenico Scarlatti, a project started by Radio France, which decided to broadcast the sonatas in celebration of the 300th anniversary of the composer's birth, in 1985. Scott Ross began recording the sonatas on June 16, 1984, and during the eighteen months of recording he knew he had a fatal illness. Ninety-eight sessions were required, and the last take was completed on September 10, 1985. In all, there had been eight thousand takes. The recording was released on the Erato label as Domenico Scarlatti, Complete Keyboard Works in a set of 34 CDs.

== Personal life ==
Ross was gay and died of pneumonia related to AIDS on June 13, 1989, in his house in Assas, France, aged 38.

== Accolades ==
In 1971 he was awarded the prestigious first prize of the Concours de Bruges.
