= Kenneth Gilbert =

Canadian musician (1931–2020)

Kenneth Gilbert OC FRSC
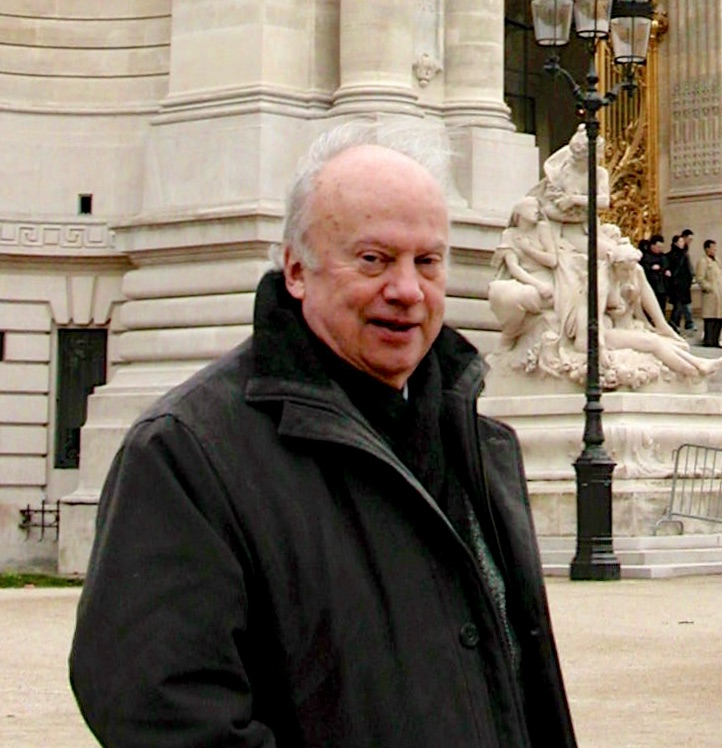
- Gilbert in 2006

Background information
- Born: December 16, 1931; Montreal, Quebec, Canada
- Died: April 15, 2020 (aged 88)
- Genres: Baroque music, ...
- Instruments: Harpsichord, organ

Kenneth Albert Gilbert OC FRSC (December 16, 1931 – April 15, 2020) was a Canadian harpsichordist, organist, musicologist, and music educator.

== Biography ==
Born in Montreal, Gilbert studied at the Conservatoire de musique du Québec à Montréal under Yvonne Hubert (piano) and Gabriel Cusson (harmony and counterpoint). He also studied the organ with Conrad Letendre in Montréal. In 1953 he won the Prix d'Europe for organ performance, an award which enabled him to pursue studies in Paris with Nadia Boulanger (composition), Maurice Duruflé (organ), Ruggero Gerlin (harpsichord), Gaston Litaize (organ), and Sylvie Spicket (harpsichord) from 1953 to 1955. He later studied the harpsichord privately under Wanda Landowska.

Gilbert made his first recordings with the Canadian label Baroque Records Co. of Canada Ltd. in 1962 – an all-J. S. Bach program, followed by several more solo harpsichord recordings of music by Bach, another of Rameau, and several chamber music albums with other Canadian artists: Mario Duschenes (flute & recorder), Steven Staryk (violin), Jacques Simard (oboe), as well as French flautist Jean-Pierre Rampal. As organist, he recorded an album of works by Boehm, Buxtehude and Walther on two Casavant-built instruments in Quebec. (All of these recordings were subsequently reissued on Orion Master Recordings in the U.S.) In 1983 he recorded a two-CD selection from the Montreal Organ Book on the Hellmuth Wolff organ at McGill University for the Canadian label Analekta.

Gilbert performed for the Peabody Mason concert series in 1974. He died on April 15, 2020, at the age of 88.

== Students ==
- Pascal Dubreuil
- Elisabetta Guglielmin
- Emmanuelle Haïm
- Sébastien d'Hérin
- Wolfgang Karius
- Oscar Milani
- Davitt Moroney
- María Luisa Ozaita
- Mario Raskin
- Ludger Rémy
- Scott Ross
- Heather Slade-Lipkin
- Jos Van Immerseel
- Jory Vinikour
- Giorgio Cerasoli
- John Whitelaw
- Ilton Wjuniski
- Paola Erdas

== Decorations and awards ==
- Officer of the Order of Canada (1986)
- Fellow of the Royal Society of Canada (1988)
- Honorary doctorate in Music (McGill University, Montreal)
- Honorary Member of the Royal Academy of Music (London)
- Officer of the Ordre des Arts et des Lettres (France)
- Austrian Cross of Honour for Science and Art, 1st class (1999)
