= Chiara Banchini =

Swiss musician (born 1946)

Chiara Banchini is a Swiss violinist, involved in the historical performance practice movement. She specializes in the music of the Baroque.

Banchini was born in 1946 in Lugano, Switzerland. She graduated from the Geneva Conservatory, where she earned the Virtuoso award; following this, she studied under Sandor Vegh and dedicated several years to the creation of contemporary works as a member of the Contrechamps Ensembleand. She then moved to the Royal Conservatory in The Hague under Sigiswald Kuijken for the Baroque violin. She taught at the Centre for Early Music in Geneva and began performing as a soloist.

In 1981, she moved from Geneva to the Schola Cantorum Basiliensis in Basel, where she formed Ensemble 415, a Baroque performance ensemble, which was dissolved in January 2012. The group took its name from a common Baroque pitch. The ensemble's recording of Arcangelo Corelli's Concerti Grossi for Harmonia Mundi was a commercial success in 1992, as was their 1996 recording of Antonio Vivaldi's Stabat Mater. She has also recorded with Erato, Virgin Records, Accent, Astreé, and Zig Zag Territories.

In 2014 she started a collaboration with Theresia Youth Baroque Orchestra of which she is permanent conductor together with Claudio Astronio and Alfredo Bernardini.

She plays a violin attributed to Nicolò Amati in 1674.
