= Isolde Ahlgrimm =

Austrian musician (1914–1995)

Background information
- Born: 31 July 1914; Vienna, Austria
- Died: 11 October 1995 (aged 81) Vienna, Austria
- Instruments: Harpsichord; Fortepiano

Isolde Ahlgrimm (31 July 1914 in Vienna – 11 October 1995 in Vienna) was an Austrian harpsichordist and fortepianist. In 1975 she was awarded the Austrian Gold Medal.

== Musical education ==
Ahlgrimm pursued her early piano studies from 1922 at the Musikakademie, Vienna (now the University of Music and Performing Arts Vienna), under the instruction of such notable teachers as Viktor Ebenstein (perhaps now best remembered as the piano soloist in Eroica (1949 film)), Emil von Sauer and Franz Schmidt.

== Revival of early music ==
Together with her husband, instrument collector Erich Fiala (1911–78), Ahlgrimm played a central role in the revival of interest in the use of period instruments for the performance of Baroque and Classical music.

Ahlgrimm and Fiala presented their long-running series of Concerte für Kenner und Liebhaber ("Concerts for connoisseurs and amateurs") in Vienna between 1937 and 1956; this involved 74 different programs of music from the 16th to the 20th centuries, much of this repertoire receiving its first modern performance.

== Career ==
She was the first to perform and record virtually the entire output of J.S. Bach for harpsichord. She performed The Bach Cycle in 12 programs in Vienna, 1949–50 and 1952–53. Before some 600 subscribers at the preconcert lectures for four of the programs in the first Bach Cycle, Ahlgrimm was the first harpsichordist to argue the case for performing Bach's last work, The Art of Fugue, in its original form as a keyboard work, an idea also adopted at that time by her younger colleague, Gustav Leonhardt (born 1928).

She performed the work for the first time in 1952 and recorded it a year later as Volume 9 of her JS Bach series. From 1937, Ahlgrimm was the first fortepianist in Europe to use original Viennese instruments in the performance of the music of W. A. Mozart. In 1951, she presented the entire solo output of Mozart in a series of nine concerts (The Mozart Cycle), on original fortepianos by Michael Rosenberger (1790) and Anton Walter (1787).

She gave the first performance of Bach's The Musical Offering in its original form, (recorded with Nikolaus Harnoncourt in 1955). With Erich Fiala, she prepared the first recordings of the Bach harpsichord concertos using original string instruments of the baroque era (drawn from Fiala's extensive collection), tuned to low pitch (c. A = 417) and strung in gut. The ensemble—led by Rudolf Baumgartner and including Nikolaus and Alice Harnoncourt alongside other leading Viennese musicians—was named the Amati Orchestra, since all of the string instruments they used had been made by either members of the Amati dynasty or their students.

Ahlgrimm was a close friend of the German composer Richard Strauss and performed a 79th birthday concert for him in Vienna's Konzerthaus (Mozart-Saal) in 1943. Strauss composed a concert-ending to a suite of dances from his last opera, Capriccio (1942), arranged by Ahlgrimm for solo harpsichord at Strauss's suggestion. The Capriccio Suite was first performed by Ahlgrimm in 1946 and was later published by Edition Schott.

Ahlgrimm joined the teaching staff of the Vienna Academy (later known as University of Music and Performing Arts, Vienna) in 1945; remaining there until 1958 when she joined the faculty of the Mozarteum University of Salzburg. She left that institution in 1962 to rejoin the faculty at the Vienna Academy where she was appointed reader in 1969 and professor in 1975. She retired from teaching in 1984. She served on the juries of many European harpsichord competitions, including those at Bruges, Rome, Geneva and Leipzig.

In addition to her numerous concerts and recordings, Isolde Ahlgrimm published many articles on various aspects of performance practice. She edited a selection of keyboard exercises and etudes, in part to dispel the notion that such exercises were a 19th century invention. This was published under the title Manuale der Orgel und Cembalo-Technik (Manual of Orgen and Harpsichord Technique, Finger Exercises and Etudes 1571-1760). A Dictionary of ornamentation, left unpublished at her death, has been completed by her colleague and Viennese musicologist, Helga Scholz-Michelitsch.

A biography of Ahlgrimm, Isolde Ahlgrimm, Vienna and the early music revival, by her student, Peter Watchorn, was published by Ashgate Publishing in 2007.

== Selected discography ==
JS Bach: Complete Works for Harpsichord (Philips) (1951–56; released 1952–59):

- Volume 1 – Das Wohltemperierte Clavier, Book 1, BWV 846–869
- Volume 2 – Six French Suites, BWV 812–817
- Volume 3 – Twenty Little Preludes, BWV 924–943
- Volume 4 – Six English Suites, BWV 806–811
- Volume 5 – Six Partitas, BWV 825–830
- Volume 6 – Das Wohltemperierte Clavier, Book 2, BWV 870–893
- Volume 7 – Goldberg Variations, BWV 988; Italian Variations, BWV 989
- Volume 8 – Sonatas for flute and obbligato harpsichord, BWV 1030–1032
- Volume 9 – Die Kunst der Fuge, BWV 1080
- Volume 10 – Das Musikalische Opfer, BWV 1079 (w/ Harnoncourt)
- Volume 11 – Three sonatas for viola da gamba, BWV 1027–1029 (w/N. Harnoncourt)
- Volume 12 – Fifteen Inventions and Fifteen Sinfonias, BWV 772–801
- Volume 13 – Fantasias, Preludes and Fugues, BWV 903, 899, 904, 906, 944, 917, 918, 919
- Volume 14 – Toccatas, BWV 910–916; Passacaglia, BWV 582; Fugues BWV 575–577
- Concertos for One and Two Harpsichords, BWV 1052–1062 (w/ Friederike Bretschneider/Amati Orchestra/Erich Fiala, cond.)
- Italian Concerto, BWV 971; French Overture, BWV 831; Four Duets, BWV 802–805; Capriccio in B-flat, BWV 992 (recorded Philips, 1975)

(also: Austrian Harpsichord Music, G. F. Handel: Eight "Great" Suites, 1720: Eterna).
