= Birgit Lodes =

German musicologist

Birgit Lodes (born 30 April 1967) is a German musicologist and professor at the University of Vienna.

== Career ==
Born in Marktredwitz, Lodes grew up in Bayreuth. In 1986, she was accepted into the Maximilianeum Foundation (Wittelsbacher Jubiläumsstiftung). From 1986 to 1991, she studied music for the teaching profession at grammar schools (with piano and violoncello) as well as musicology with the subsidiary subjects Organisation Psychology and General Pedagogy at the Hochschule für Musik and at LMU Munich. In 1988/89, she studied at the University of California. In 1991, she passed her first state examination in school music. In 1992/93, she was a visiting fellow at Harvard University.

In 1995, she received her doctorate with the distinction summa cum laude from LMU Munich. Her dissertation Das Gloria in Beethoven's Missa solemnis was awarded the doctorate prize of the university. From 1994 to 2004, Lodes was a research assistant, assistant and senior assistant at the Institute of Musicology at LMU Munich, and from 1998 to 2000, she was also a faculty representative of the academic mid-level faculty, receiving a three-year habilitation scholarship. From 1995 to 1998, she was also a lecturer at the University of Music and Theatre Munich for the history of song and music.

In 2002, she completed her habilitation at LMU Munich. The title of the habilitation thesis is Gregor Mewe's' "Concentus harmonici and Jacob Obrechts last masses". Subsequently, in the summer semester 2002, she represented the C3-Professorship for Musicology at the University of Erlangen–Nuremberg. In the winter semester 2002/03, she completed a visiting professorship at the Institute of Musicology at the University of Vienna.

Since February 2004, she has been a university professor for musicology there, with special emphasis on older historical musicology. In 2008, she was elected corresponding member of the philosophical-historical class of the Austrian Academy of Sciences. Since 2013 she has been a member of the Academia Europaea.

Lodes is a member of the advisory board of the Studien zur Wertungsforschung.

== Publications ==
=== Books ===
- Das Gloria in Beethovens Missa solemnis (Münchner Veröffentlichungen zur Musikgeschichte, volume 54), Tutzing 1997, ISBN 3-7952-0853-X

=== Essays ===
- Richard Strauss’ Skizzen zu den „Metamorphosen“ und ihre Beziehung zu „Trauer um München“, in Die Musikforschung, Jg. 47 (1994), pp. 234–25
- Eine „Urfassung“ der „Metamorphosen“ von Richard Strauss?, in Musica, Jg. 48 (1994), pp. 275–279
- „Von Herzen – möge es wieder – zu Herzen gehn!“ Zur Widmung von Beethovens Missa solemnis, in Altes im Neuen. Festschrift Theodor Göllner zum 65. Geburtstag, edited by Bernd Edelmann and Manfred Hermann Schmid, Tutzing 1995, pp. 295–306
- Beethovens individuelle Aneignung der langsamen Einleitung. Zum Kopfsatz des String Quartet No. 12 op. 127, in Musica, Jg. 49 (1995), pp. –311
- „When I try, now and then, to give musical form to my turbulent feelings…“ The Human and the Divine in the Gloria of Beethoven's Missa solemnis, in: Beethoven Forum 6, Lincoln-London 1998, pp. 143–179
- Das 19. Jahrhundert, in Messe und Motette, edited by Horst Leuchtmann and Siegfried Mauser, Laaber 1998, p. 270–332
- Klausel Nr. 24 und 25, in Die Klauseln der Handschrift Saint-Victor (Paris, BN, lat. 15139), edited by Fred Büttner, Tutzing 1999, pp. 182–195
- with Fred Büttner, Klausel Nr. 12, in ebenda, pp. 92–98
- Strauss’ Bearbeitungen im „Bürger als Edelmann“ und Stravinsky's Pulcinella, in Compositionswissenschaft. Festschrift Reinhold und Roswitha Schlötterer zum 70. Geburtstag, edited by Bernd Edelmann and Sabine Kurth, Augsburg 1999, pp. 261–279
- Der „moderne“ Strauss auf dem Weg zum Klassiker? Inszenierung und Kritik am Beispiel der Richard Strauss-Woche, München 1910, in Richard Strauss und die Moderne, edited by the Direction of the Münchner Philharmoniker, Munich 1999, pp. 188–205
- Nach Beethoven: Musik und Text in Schubert's Mass No. 6, in Schubert-Jahrbuch 1997. Bericht über den Internationalen Schubert-Kongreß Duisburg 1997. Franz Schubert – Werk und Rezeption, part 1, Lieder und Gesänge – Geistliche Werke, edited by Dietrich Berke, Walther Dürr, Walburga Litschauer and Christiane Schumann, Duisburg 1999, pp. 155–176
- Probing the sacred genres: Beethoven’s religious songs, oratorio, and masses, in The Cambridge Companion to Beethoven, edited by Glenn Stanley, Cambridge 2000, pp. 218–236 and p. 332–334
- Zarathustra im Dunkel. Zu Strauss’ Dehmel-Vertonung Notturno, op. 44 No. 1, in Richard Strauss und die Moderne. Bericht über das internationale Symposium München, 21. bis 23. Juli 1999, edited by Bernd Edelmann, Birgit Lodes and Reinhold Schlötterer, Berlin 2001, pp. 251–282
- Messen-Kompositionen im Ausgang der Wiener Klassik: Konnte Beethoven von Cherubini lernen?, in Anton Bruckner – Tradition und Fortschritt in der Kirchenmusik des 19. Jahrhunderts, edited by Friedrich Wilhelm Riedel, Sinzig 2001, pp. 207–236
- „Maria zart“ und die Angst vor Fegefeuer und Malafrantzos – Die Karriere eines Liedes zu Beginn des 16. Jahrhunderts, in Trossinger Jahrbuch für Renaissancemusik 1, Kassel, pp. 99–133
- An anderem Ort, auf andere Art: Petruccis und Mewes’ Obrecht-Drucke, in Basler Jahrbuch für historische Musikpraxis, volume 25, Winterthur 2002, pp. 85–111
- Verweigertes Laut. Beethovens Idee und ihre Realisation durch Interpret und Hörer, in Dem Ohr voraus. Erwartung und Vorurteil in der Musik, edited by Andreas Dorschel, Vienna 2004, pp. 79–111
- Beethoven's Sonaten für Klavier und Violoncello op. 5 in ihrem gattungsgeschichtlichen Kontext, in Beethovens Werke für Klavier und Violoncello. Bericht über die Internationale Fachkonferenz Bonn, 18.–20. Juni 1998, edited by Sieghard Brandenburg, Ingeborg Maaß und Wolfgang Osthoff, Bonn 2004, pp. 1–60
- Schubert und Lachner lesen Heinrich Heines „Ich stand in dunkeln Träumen“, in Musikgeschichte als Verstehensgeschichte. Festschrift für Gernot Gruber zum 65. Geburtstag, edited by Joachim Brügge, Franz Födermayr, Wolfgang Gratzer, Thomas Hochradner and Siegfried Mauser, Tutzing 2004, pp. 279–310
- with Matthias Miller, Hic jacet Ludovicas Fenfflius. Neues zur Biographie von Ludwig Senfl, in Die Musikforschung, Jg. 58 (2005), pp. 260–266
- „so träumte mir, ich reiste […] nach Indien“: Temporality and Mythology in Opus 127/I, in The String Quartets of Beethoven, edited by William Kinderman, Urbana and Chicago 2006, pp. 168–213 – German translation in Kammermusik an Rhein und Main. Beiträge zur Geschichte des Streichquartetts, edited by Kristina Pfarr and Karl Böhmer, Mainz 2007, pp. 267–320
- Franz Lachner' „Sängerfahrt“ op. 33 auf Texte von Heinrich Heine, in Franz Lachner und seine Brüder, edited by Hartmut Schick and Stephan Hörner, Tutzing 2006, pp. 213–246
- Text und Musik, in Diskurs. Sprache. Text. Eine methodenorientierte Einführung in die Sprachwissenschaft für Romanistinnen und Romanisten, edited by Michael Metzeltin, 3rd edition. Vienna 2008, pp. 291–317
- Reflexionen zu Beethoven und Mozart, in Mitteilungsblatt der Wiener Beethoven-Gesellschaft, Jg. 37, issue 4/2006, pp. 16–23
- Ludwig Senfl and the Munich Choirbooks, in Die Münchner Hofkapelle des 16. Jahrhunderts im europäischen Kontext, edited by Theodor Göllner and Bernhold Schmid, Munich 2006, pp. 224–233
- Sigmund Salmingers Selectissimae cantiones (Augsburg 1540) als musikalischer Geschenkdruck für Königin Maria von Ungarn, in Gutenberg-Jahrbuch 2008, pp. 93–106
- Musikdruck als Medienrevolution? Codex versus Buch im 15. und 16. Jahrhundert, in Vom Preis des Fortschritts. Gewinn und Verlust in der Musikgeschichte, edited by Andreas Dorschel and Andreas Haug, Vienna 2008, pp. 161–194
- with Laurenz Lütteken, Einleitung, in Institutionalisierung als Prozeß. Organisationsformen musikalischer Eliten im Europa des 15. und 16. Jahrhunderts, edited by Birgit Lodes and Laurenz Lütteken, Laaber 2008, pp. 1–14
- Multiple Erscheinungsformen einer Vorlage: „Maria zart“ kontrafaziert und bearbeitet, in Die Kunst des Übergangs. Musik über Musik in der Renaissance, edited by Nicole Schwindt, Kassel 2008, pp. 63–101
- Des Kaisers Alamire: Zur Entstehung des Chorbuchs Wien, Österreichische Nationalbibliothek, Mus. Hs. 15495, in Uno gentile et subtile ingenio: Studies in Renaissance Music in Honour of Bonnie J. Blackburn, edited by Jennifer Bloxam, Gioia Filocamo and Leofranc Holford-Strevens, Turnhout 2009, pp. 247–258
- „Nicht weiter! hier der Kirchenmusik, dort der Symphonie zurufend“. Hanslicks Blick auf Beethoven. In Eduard Hanslick zum Gedenken. Bericht des Symposions zum Anlass seines 100. Todestages. Edited by Theophil Antonicek, Gernot Gruber and Christoph Landerer, Tutzing 2010, pp. 259–296
- Das Jahr 1507 in (musik-)drucktechnischer Perspektive, in NiveauNischeNimbus. Die Anfänge des Musikdrucks nördlich der Alpen, edited by Birgit Lodes, Tutzing 2010, pp. 33–66
- “Le congrès danse”: Set Form and Improvisation in Beethoven's Polonaise for Piano, Op. 89, in Musical Quarterly, Jg. 93 (2010), pp. 414–449
- Musikhistoriographie ohne Kunstwerke? Carl Dahlhaus und die Alte Musik, in Carl Dahlhaus und die Musikwissenschaft: Werk, Wirkung, Aktualität, edited by Hermann Danuser, Schliengen 2011, pp. 176–196
