= Giselher Schubert =

German musicologist

Giselher Schubert (born 24 January 1944) is a German musicologist.

== Life and career ==
Born in Königsberg, Schubert studied musicology, sociology and philosophy at the Rheinische Friedrich-Wilhelms-Universität Bonn with Günther Massenkeil, at the Freie Universität Berlin with Rudolf Stephan and at the University of Zürich with Kurt von Fischer. In 1973 he was honored in Bonn with a thesis on instrumentation with Arnold Schoenberg which gained him his PhD.

Since 1974 he has been working as the editor of the Hindemith Complete Edition at the Hindemith Institute in Frankfurt, which he directed from 1991 to 2011. Since 2005 he has been co-editor of the Hindemith Complete Edition. From 1985 to 1996 he was co-editor of the journal Musiktheorie. He is co-editor of the Kurt Weill complete edition and member of the editorial board of the Bohuslav Martinů Complete Edition. Until 2010 he was chairman of the Society for the Promotion of the Arnold Schönberg complete edition. Since 1986 he has been a freelance contributor to the magazine Fono Forum.

Schubert is honorary professor at the Frankfurt University of Music and Performing Arts. He publishes mainly on music of the 19th and 20th centuries, on music theory and on Aesthetics of music.

== Publications ==
- Studien zur Instrumentation beim frühen Schönberg. Dissertation. Bonn University 1973. Published under the title Schönbergs frühe Instrumentation. Koerner, Baden-Baden 1975, ISBN 3-87320-559-9.
- Paul Hindemith. In Selbstzeugnissen und Bilddokumenten. Dargestellt von Giselher Schubert. Rowohlt, Reinbek bei Hamburg 1981, ISBN 3-499-50299-2. 2nd edition 1986. 3rd edition 1990. 4th edition 1995. 5th edition 1999.
  French: Paul Hindemith Actes Sud, Arles 1997, ISBN 2-7427-1049-3.
- with Andres Briner, Dieter Rexroth: Paul Hindemith. Leben und Werk in Bild und Text. Schott, Mainz 1988, ISBN 3-7957-0204-6.
  Italienisch: Paul Hindemith. Vita e opere. DeFerrari, Genua 1995, ISBN 88-7172-033-4.
- with Constantin Floros, Christian Martin Schmidt: Johannes Brahms – die Sinfonien. Einführung, Kommentar, Analyse. Schott, Mainz 1998, ISBN 3-7957-8711-4.
- Hindemith und Honegger, Konturen einer ungewöhnlichen Freundschaft. Amadeus, Winterthur um 2008, ISBN 978-3-905075-16-8.

Editorship:

- Ludus tonalis (1942). Studies in counterpoint, tonal organisation and piano playing. Schott, Mainz und Universal-Edition, Wienna c. 1989.
- Andres Briner: Musikalische Koexistenz. MWith a foreword by Hermann Danuser. Schott, Mainz 1993, ISBN 3-7957-1868-6.
- Paul Hindemith: Aufsätze, Vorträge, Reden. Atlantis, Zürich/Mainz 1994, ISBN 3-254-00190-7.
- Alte Musik im 20. Jahrhundert. Wandlungen und Formen ihrer Rezeption. Schott, Mainz etc. c. 1995, ISBN 3-7957-1870-7.
- Biographische Konstellation und künstlerisches Handeln. Schott, Mainz u. a. 1997, ISBN 3-7957-0320-4.
- Französische und deutsche Musik im 20. Jahrhundert. Schott, Mainz u. a. 2001, ISBN 3-7957-0433-2.
- mit Wolfgang Rathert: Musikkultur in der Weimarer Republik. Schott, Mainz u. a. 2001, ISBN 3-7957-0114-7.
- mit Sabine Ehrmann-Herfort, Ludwig Finscher: Europäische Musikgeschichte. Bärenreiter, Kassel 2002, ISBN 3-7618-2024-0.

Contributions:

- Paul Hindemith: USA-Tagebuch 1938. In Schweizer Jahrbuch für Musikwissenschaft. Neue Folge. 8/9, 1988/1989, pp. 37–70.
- La concezione della musica nell’opera „Cardillac“. In Carlo Piccardi, Luigi Pestalozza: Paul Hindemith nella cultura tedesca degli anni venti. Unicopli, Mailand 1991, ISBN 88-7061-929-X, pp. 185–196.
- Werkfassung und Werkidee. Kompositorische Probleme im Oeuvre Hindemiths. In Die Musikforschung. year 45, issue 1, 1992, pp. 21–36.
- „Ein bisschen daheim sein“. zu den Problemen der in die USA emigrierten Komponisten in den 30er und 40er Jahren. In Hermann Danuser (edit.): Amerikanische Musik seit Charles Ives. Laaber, Laaber 1993, ISBN 3-89007-117-1, pp. 73–89.
- Form und Besetzung. Zu Frank Martins Konzerten. In: Dietrich Kämper (edit.): Frank Martin. Das kompositorische Werk. 13 Studien. Schott, Mainz among others. 1993, ISBN 3-7957-1892-9, pp. 95–109.
- Themes and double themes. The problem of the symphonic in Brahms. In 19th century music. Volume 18, No. 1, 1994/1995, pp. 10–23.
- Form als „Text“. Eine Skizze. In Musik als Text. Volume 1. 1998. p. 181–184.
- „Amerikanismus“ und „Americanism“. Hindemith und die Neue Welt. In Hindemith-Jahrbuch. 27, 1998, pp. 80–101.
- Hindemiths Orchesterwerk. In Norbert Bolin (edit.): Paul Hindemith – Komponist zwischen Tradition und Avantgarde. Schott, Mainz among others 1999, ISBN 3-7957-1896-1, pp. 45–63.
- Zur Einschätzung und Deutung des musikalischen Fortschrittsdenkens in der Musikkultur der Weimarer Republik. In Giselher Schubert, Wolfgang Rathert (edit.): Musikkultur in der Weimarer Republik. Schott, Mainz among others. 2001, ISBN 3-7957-0114-7, p. 54–65.
- Der lange Blick zurück. Hindemiths Operneinakter „Das lange Weihnachtsmahl“. In Christoph-Hellmut Mahling, Kristina Pfarr (edit.): Musiktheater im Spannungsfeld zwischen Tradition und Experiment (from 1960 until 1980). 2002, pp. 43–50.
- Bekehrung, Verrat, Entwicklung? Strawinskys Wendung zur Zwölftonmusik. In Europäische Musikgeschichte. Bärenreiter, Kassel 2002, ISBN 3-7618-2024-0, pp. 1195–1251.
- „Der Lindberghflug“ von Weill, Hindemith und Brecht. Konzeption und Funktion. In Hermann Danuser (edit.): Amerikanismus - Americanism - Weill. Argus, Schliengen 2003, ISBN 3-931264-23-8, p. 258–270.
- Ein Streichquartett nach Beethoven. Zum unvollendeten Streichquartett von Ernest Chausson. In Archiv für Musikwissenschaft. Year 69, issue 2, 2012, pp. 131–141.
