= Speckner =

Speckner is a surname, and may refer to:

- Anna Barbara Speckner, German harpsichordist
- Bettina Speckner, German jewelry designer
- Joe Speckner, American politician

== See also ==
- Speck
