= Joachim Brügge =

German musicologist

Joachim Brügge (born in 1958) is a German musicologist and composer.

== Life ==
Brügge was born in Kiel. After his studies of music theory at the Musikhochschule Lübeck (Diploma 1985), he studied Historical and Systematic Musicology/Music Ethnology and Ethnology at the Georg-August-Universität Göttingen and completed his studies in 1993 with a thesis under Martin Staehelin "On the Personal Style of Wolfgang Amadeus Mozart". In 2002 he habilitated at the University Mozarteum Salzburg on the subject of historical musicology with the thesis Wolfgang Rihm's string quartets. Aspects of analysis, aesthetics and genre theory of the modern string quartet.

Since 1994 he has been working at the Universität Mozarteum Salzburg, first at the Department 1 for musical composition/conducting and music theory and, after his habilitation, at the Department 9, musicology.

Since 2003 he has been working together with Peter Kuon and Sabine Coelsch-Foisner on the development of the focal point Science and Art, which is the cooperation between the University Mozarteum Salzburg and the University of Salzburg in teaching, scientific-artistic projects and publications.

In 2006 he founded the Institute for History of Musical Reception and Interpretation at the University Mozarteum Salzburg together with Wolfgang Gratzer and Thomas Hochradner.

Together with Thomas Bodmer and Hildemar Holl, numerous projects on the life and work of Stefan Zweig have been realized since 2002, which among others led to the foundation of the Zweig Centre in Salzburg in 2008.

== Main areas of research ==
The modern music history of the 18th-20th century is at the centre of Bruges' musicological work, with the following focal points:

- Viennese classic (W.A. Mozart),
- 19th century instrumental music,
- New music after 1975 (among others Rihm),
- scientific-theoretical questions concerning the musicological methodological discourse (analysis and reception, possibilities and limits of contextualism, critical questioning of fashion topics such as intertextuality among others),
- American music (also popular music of the 70s, American music theatre).

== Teaching activities ==
The teaching activities include music historical topics (history of piano music, history of chamber music, history of music theory, song analysis, music history at a glance) as well as selected topics (sociology of music, film music among others).

== Contributions to university development ==
At the end of the 1990s the University Mozarteum Salzburg had to cope with major tasks such as the closure and reconstruction of the main building on Mirabellplatz in 1998, the implementation of various austerity programmes with the reduction of the study plans or the management of the Mozart Year 2006. Brugge was involved in the following working groups:

- 1999-2002: Participation in numerous working groups on the revision of the course plans.
- since WS 2003: Commissioner for Cooperation with Paris Lodron University.
- from 2009 to 2012: Chairman of the Curricula Commission "Science and Art" of the University Mozarteum Salzburg.
- from October 2002-October 2004, Institute Board of the Institute 14.
- 2007-2009: Working group "Artistic Master Thesis".
- 2003-2010: with Peter Kuon, head of the focus "Science and Arts", from 2010 to 2014 with Peter Kuon Program Director: Science and Arts: Arts & Humanities.
- since 2011: director of the Institute for the History of Musical Reception and Interpretation at the Mozarteum University Salzburg.

== Publications ==
Bruges has written numerous essays and articles on the history of music from the 18th to the 20th century. The present selection lists the book publications:

As author

- Intertextualität und Rezeptionsgeschichte? W.A. Mozart, Divertimento in Es-Dur KV 563 (klang-reden, vol. 12), Freiburg i.Br. 2014, ISBN 978-3-7930-9743-3.
- Jean Sibelius: Symphonie und Symphonische Dichtung (Beck. Studienführer: Wissen), Munich 2009, ISBN 978-3-406-58247-9.
- Habilitationsschrift (Salzburg 2001): Wolfgang Rihms Streichquartette. Aspekte zu Analyse, Ästhetik und Gattungstheorie des modernen Streichquartetts], 2004, ISBN 3-89727-261-X.
- Dissertation: Zum Personalstil W. A. Mozarts. Untersuchungen zu Modell und Typus, am Beispiel der "Kleinen Nachtmusik", KV 525 (Taschenbücher zur Musikwissenschaft, vol. 121, edited by Richard Schaal), Wilhelmshaven 1996, ISBN 3-7959-0685-7.

As editor

- "Kosmisches Arkadien" und "Wienerische Schlampigkeit". Johann Strauss (Sohn), An der schönen blauen Donau, op. 314 – Studien zur Rezeptions- und Interpretationsgeschichte (klang-reden. Schriften zur Musikalischen Rezeptions- und Interpretationsgeschichte, vol. 21), Freiburg i. Br.: Rombach 2018, ISBN 978-3-7930-9909-3.
- Sowohl Mozart als auch ... . Salzburger Jubiläumstagung der Rezeptions- und Interpretationsforschung (2016) (klang-reden. Schriften zur Musikalischen Rezeptions- und Interpretationsgeschichte, Bd. 18), Freiburg i. Br.: Rombach 2017, ISBN 978-3-7930-9900-0.
- Zwischen ›Cultural Heritage‹ und Konzertführer. W.A. Mozart, Eine Kleine Nachtmusik in den Medien (klang-reden, Bd. 15), Freiburg i. Br.: Rombach 2016, ISBN 978-3-7930-9838-6.
- zusammen mit Sabine Coelsch-Foisner: My Fair Lady. Eine transdisziplinäre Einführung, Heidelberg: Universitätsverlag Winter 2015, ISBN 978-3-8253-6519-6.
- Zur Interpretation von W.A. Mozarts Kammermusik (klang-reden, vol. 14), Freiburg i. Br.: Rombach 2015, ISBN 978-3-7930-9796-9.
- Facetten I: Symposien zur Kammermusik von Jean Sibelius, zum Liederkomponisten Max Kowalski und zur Liszt-Rezeption (Musikwissenschaftliche Schriften der Hochschule für Musik und Theater München.Edited by Siegfried Mauser and Claus Bockmaier, vol. 6), Tutzing: Schneider 2014, ISBN 978-3-86296-074-3.
- together with Nils Grosch: Singin´ in the Rain. Kulturgeschichte eines Hollywood-Musical-Klassikers(Populäre Kultur und Musik, vol. 14), Münster among others: Waxmann 2014, ISBN 978-3-8309-3009-9.
- together with Ulrich Leisinger: Aspekte der Haydn-Rezeption (klang-reden, vol. 6), Freiburg i. Br.: Rombach 2011, ISBN 978-3-7930-9657-3.
- Coverstrategien in der Popularmusik nach 1960 (klang-reden, vol. 11), Freiburg i. Br.: Rombach 2013, ISBN 978-3-7930-9742-6.
- "Das Buch als Eingang zur Welt" (1. Band der Schriftenreihe des Stefan Zweig Centre Salzburg, edited by Hildemar Holl, Karl Müller, Gerhard Langer and Klemens Renoldner), Würzburg 2008, ISBN 978-3-8260-3983-6.
- together with Wolfgang Gratzer and Thomas Hochradner: Mozarts letzte Sinfonien. Stationen ihrer Interpretationsgeschichte,(klang-reden, vol. 1), Freiburg i. Br.: Rombach 2008, ISBN 978-3-7930-9518-7.
- together with Ulrike Kammerhofer-Aggermann: Kulturstereotype und Unbekannte Kulturlandschaften am Beispiel von Amerika und Europa (Wort und Musik. Salzburger akademische Beiträge, edited by Ulrich Müller among others., vol. 66), Salzburg 2007, ISBN 978-3-901681-09-7.
- together with Gerhard Ammerer: Mozart interdisziplinär. Beiträge aus den Salzburger Ringvorlesungen zum "Mozart-Jahr" 2006 (Wort und Musik. Salzburger akademische Beiträge, edited by Ulrich Müller among others, vol. 64), Salzburg 2007, ISBN 978-3-902537-06-5.
- together with Wolfgang Gratzer and Otto Neumaier: Bildmusik. Gerhard Rühm und die Kunst der Gegenwart, Saarbrücken 2007, ISBN 978-3-89727-335-1.
- together with Claudia M. Knispel: Mozarts Orchesterwerke und Konzerte (Das Mozart-Handbuch, edited by Gernot Gruber, in cooperation with Dieter Borchmeyer, vol. 1), Laaber 2007, ISBN 978-3-89007-461-0.
- together with Gernot Gruber: Mozart Lexikon (Das Mozart-Handbuch, edited by Gernot Gruber, in cooperation with Dieter Borchmeyer, vol. 6), Laaber 2005, ISBN 3-89007-466-9.
- together with Franz Födermayr, Wolfgang Gratzer, Thomas Hochradner and Siegfried Mauser: Musikgeschichte als Verstehensgeschichte. Festschrift Gernot Gruber, Tutzing 2004, ISBN 3-7952-1173-5.
- together with Siegfried Mauser (editorial activities): Sonderband Wolfgang Rihm Musik-Konzepte 2004 (series-Hg. Ulrich Tadday), ISBN 3-88377-782-X.

== Memberships and awards ==
- Since 2019 Member of the Academy for Mozart Research of the Mozarteum Foundation
- International Grand Prize for Science and Research 2018, Cultural Fund of the City of Salzburg
- Bruges has been a member of the International Stefan Zweig Society Salzburg (ISZG) since 2000 and since 2015 honorary member of the Dutch Stefan Zweig Society (Stefan Zweig Genootschap Nederland).
