= Horst Leuchtmann =

German musicologist

Horst Leuchtmann (26 April 1927 – 10 April 2007) was a German musicologist.

== Early life and education ==
Leuchtmann was born in Braunschweig. He was a student of the composer Philippine Schick (1893–1970). They compiled a German-English dictionary of music (R. D. Brühs, F. Messmer, R. Reitzer: Philippine Schick, Tutzing 2005).

He was promoted to the Doctorate in 1957, having completed his thesis, The Musical Interpretations of Words in the Motets of the Magnum Opus Musicum by Orlando di Lasso.

== Career ==
Leuchtmann became a research associate at the Bavarian Academy of Sciences and Humanities. From 1983 to 1995, he was a lecturer (since 1986 in an honorary professorship) at the Hochschule für Musik und Theater München, and from 1986 to 1995 he held lectureship at the Ludwig-Maximilians-Universität München.

The focal points of his research were the music of the 16th century and the modern era. On behalf of the Bavarian Academy of Sciences and Humanities, he compiled an index of the compositions of Orlando di Lasso.

From 1972 to 1995, Leuchtmann was editor for Musik in Bayern (Music in Bavaria), the journal of the Society for Bavarian Music History. He was senior editor for the 1978 published polyglot music dictionary Terminorum Musicae Index Septem Linguis Redactus.

== Honors and awards ==
- Member of the Bavarian Academy of Fine Arts (1989)
- Dr. Jürgen Krackow Prize (1995) by the Bavarian Academy of the Sciences
- Honorary Professor at the Hochschule für Musik und Theater München (1986)
- Federal Cross of Merit (1996)

== Personal life and demise ==
Leuchtmann died at age 79 on 10 April 2007, and he was buried at the Neukeferloh cemetery on 27 April.

== Publications ==
- Die musikalischen Wortausdeutungen in den Motetten des Magnum Opus Musicum von Orlando di Lasso, Dissertation 1959
- Kritik und Betrachtung – Gesammelte Aufsätze und Kritiken (with Alexander Berrsche und Hermann Rinn), 2. Revised edition of the Trösterin Musica edited by Harmann Rinn and Hans Rupe., 1964
- Orlando di Lasso. Sein Leben. Versuch einer Bestandsaufnahme der biographischen Einzelheiten, Wiesbaden 1976
- Wörterbuch Musik: Dictionary of Terms in Music: English-German/ German-English, Munich 1977
- Musik. Menschen, Instrumente und Ereignisse in Bildern und Dokumenten (with Christian Barth and Holger Fliessbach), Dortmund 1979
- Die Münchner Fürstenhochzeit von 1568. Massimo Troiano: Dialoge. Zwiegespräche über die Festlichkeiten bei der Hochzeit des bayerischen Erbherzogs Wilhelm V. with Renata of Lorraine, in Munich, im Februar 1568. (Faksimile, ed.), Munich and Salzburg 1980, ISBN 3-87397-503-3
- Orlando di Lasso. Musik der Renaissance am Münchner Fürstenhof. Ausstellung zum 450. Geburtstag (with Helmut Hell), Wiesbaden 1982
- Carl Orff. Ein Gedenkbuch, Tutzing 1985
- Yehudi Menuhin. Kunst als Hoffnung für die Menschheit. Reden und Schriften. Mit einer Laudatio von Pierre Bertaux, Munich 1986
- Quaestiones in musica. Festschrift für Franz Krautwurst zum 65. Geburtstag (with Friedhelm Brusniak), Tutzing 1989
- 65. Bachfest der Neuen Bachgesellschaft Leipzig. Munich, 13. bis 19. November 1990. Beiträge und Programme (as publisher.), Tutzing 1990
- Orlando di Lasso. Prachthandschriften und Quellenüberlieferung. Aus den Beständen der Bayerischen Staatsbibliothek München (with Hartmut Schaefer), Tutzing 1994
- Orlando di Lasso. Prachthandschriften und Quellenüberlieferung. Aus den Beständen der Bayerischen Staatsbibliothek München – Zum 400. Todestag anlässlich der gleichnamigen Ausstellung in der Bayerischen Staatsbibliothek München, vom 1. Juni bis 30. Juli 1994 (with Hartmut Schaefer), Tutzing 1994
- Musik in Bayern, Halbjahresschrift der Gesellschaft für Bayerische Musikgeschichte e.V., issue 53, Tutzing 1997
- Motette und Messe (with Siegfried Mauser), 1998
