= Wolfgang Rathert =

German musicologist (born 1960)

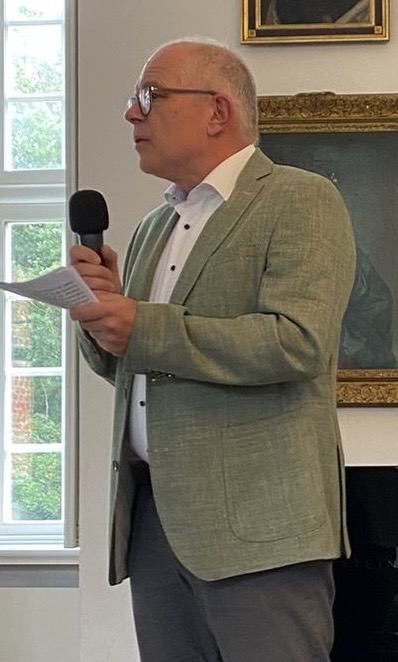
Image of Wolfgang Rathert

Wolfgang Rathert (born 17 July 1960) is a German musicologist.

== Life and career ==
Born in Minden, Rathert passed the C-examination as a church musician during his school time and acquired the Abitur at the Herder-Gymnasium Minden. After his community service he studied historical musicology, philosophy and Modern history at the Free University of Berlin from 1980 to 1987. In 1987, he was awarded a PhD in musicology by Rudolf Stephan with a thesis on the US-American composer Charles Ives.

Afterwards, he worked for the Handbuch der historischen Buchbestände and later with a scholarship of the Deutsche Forschungsgemeinschaft postdoctoral researcher at the Paul Sacher Foundation in Basel. From 1989 to 1991, he completed a career training to become a scientific librarian at the Staatsbibliothek zu Berlin and at the Fachhochschule für Bibliotheks- und Dokumentationswesen Köln, which he completed with an assessor work on the historical textbook collection (opera libretti) of the music department of the Berlin State Library.

From 1991 to 2002, he was head of the music and performing arts department of the Zentralbibliothek der TU und UdK Berlin of the Universität der Künste Berlin; in 1994/1995, he was also briefly head of the music department of the Sächsische Landesbibliothek - Staats- und Universitätsbibliothek Dresden. From 1996 to 2002, he was lecturer and Privatdozent respectively at the Humboldt University of Berlin, where he received his habilitation in 1999 under the mentorship of Hermann Danuser. In the summer semester 2000, he represented the chair of Wilhelm Seidel at the Musicological Institute of Leipzig University.

In 2002, he was appointed as a professor of historical musicology with a focus on 20th century and new music at the Institute for Musicology of LMU Munich. He has given guest lectures at Cornell University, Harvard University, the University of Illinois at Urbana-Champaign and Seoul National University.

Rathert has been a member of the board of trustees of the Géza Anda Foundation in Zürich since 2012. Since 2014, he has been chairman of the jury of the Schneider-Schott Music Prize and a member of the Board of Trustees and the Scientific Committee of the Paul Sacher Foundation. He is also chairman of the advisory board of the Deutsches Musikarchiv, deputy managing director of the Karl Amadeus Hartmann Society in Munich and member of the project advisory board of the Deutscher Musikrat music information center. He is a member of the Advisory Board of the book series Musical Cultures of the Twentieth Century and served as member of the Advisory Board of the magazine Musik-Konzepte from 2004 to 2022.

== Publications ==
Author:

- The Seen and Unseen. Studien zum Werk von Charles Ives. Dissertation. Freie Universität Berlin 1987. Katzbichler, Munich/Salzburg 1991, ISBN 3-87397-078-3.
- Charles Ives. Wissenschaftliche Buchgesellschaft, Darmstadt 1989, ISBN 3-534-03249-7. 2nd edition 1996.
- Die Textbuchsammlung der Musikabteilung der Deutschen Staatsbibliothek Berlin unter besonderer Berücksichtigung der Mozartopern. Assessorarbeit. Fachhochschule für Bibliotheks- und Dokumentationswesen, Cologne 1991.
- (collaborator): Die Max-Reger-Sammlung im Stadtarchiv Weiden i. d. OPf. Carus, Stuttgart 2007, ISBN 978-3-89948-086-3.
- with Berndt Ostendorf: Musik der USA. Kultur- und musikgeschichtliche Streifzüge. Wolke, Hofheim 2018, ISBN 978-3-95593-112-4.
- Herbert von Karajan. Macht – Ohnmacht – Vermächtnis (part of the series Solo. Porträts und Profile). edition text + kritik, München 2026, ISBN 978-3-96707-618-9.

(Co-)Editor:

- with Dietmar Schenk: Pianisten in Berlin. Klavierspiel und Klavierausbildung seit dem 19. Jahrhundert. Hochschule der Künste Berlin, Berlin 1999, ISBN 3-89462-068-4.
- with Dietmar Schenk: Carl Flesch und Max Rostal. Aspekte der Berliner Streichertradition. Universität der Künste Berlin, Berlin 2002, ISBN 3-89462-090-0.
- with Giselher Schubert: Musikkultur in der Weimarer Republik. Schott, Mainz u. a. 2001, ISBN 3-7957-0114-7.
- with Jürgen Selk: Kurt Weill: Chamber Music. Partitur und kritische Kommentierung. Kurt Weill Foundation for Music, New York 2004, ISBN 0-913574-63-5.
- with Herbert Schneider, Karl Anton Rickenbacher: Olivier Messiaen — Texte, Analysen, Zeugnisse. 2 volumes. Olms, Hildesheim.
  Volume 1: Texte aus dem Traité de rythme, de couleur et d’ornithologie. 2012, ISBN 978-3-487-14765-9.
  Volume 2: Das Werk im historischen und analytischen Kontext. 2013, ISBN 978-3-487-14766-6.
- With Carol J. Oja, Anne C. Shreffler, Felix Meyer: Crosscurrents. European and American Music in Interaction, 1900–2000. Proceedings of the Conferences at Cambridge, Mass. 2008, and Munich 2009. Boydell, Suffolk 2014, ISBN 978-1-84383-900-2.
- With Andreas Hérm Baumgartner: „Offenheit, Treue, Brüderlichkeit …“ Karl Amadeus und Elisabeth Hartmann im Briefwechsel mit Hans Werner Henze. Briefe und Dokumente. Allitera, München 2022, ISBN 978-3-96233-304-1.
- With Knut Andreas: Musikalischer Kosmos Brasilien [Musical cosmos Brazil]]. Special Issue Die Tonkunst Vol. 17 /2023, No. 3 , p. 260–345 [10 contributions by Brazilian und German authors], ISSN 1863-3536.
- Ilse Weber: „Es war einmal, es ist noch gar nicht lange her“. Erzählungen für Kinder 1928–1935. Hentrich & Hentrich, Leipzig 2023,ISBN 978-3-95565-589-1.
