= Andres Briner =

Swiss journalist and music historian (1923–2014)

Andres Briner (31 May 1923 – 1 June 2014) was a Swiss musicologist, music historian, academic, music critic, and art journalist

== Life ==
Andres Briner was born in Zürich, Switzerland on 31 May 1923. He initially studied at the Zurich Conservatory; training there as a violinist and violist. In his early career he worked as a conductor of the orchestra and choir at a local church, and as a sound engineer for the Radio-Orchester Beromünster. He pursued further studies at the University of Zurich (UZ) where he studied musicology under Paul Hindemith. In 1953 he received his doctorate from Antoine-Elisée Cherbuliez at the UZ.

He worked with Rolf Liebermann at the Zurich Radio Studio from 1953 to 1955, after which he went to the Department of Music at the University of Pennsylvania, where he taught until 1964. From 1964 to 1988 he was the successor of Willi Schuh as editor of the feature section of the Neue Zürcher Zeitung in the fields of music and musicology. He wrote music criticism for this publication; covering the Zurich Opera House during the tenure of Claus Helmut Drese and writing on the Tonhalle-Orchester Zürich under a series of conductors which were not always to his taste.

As a writer on music, Briner's main areas of work were the work of Paul Hindemith and New German School since 1880, as well as composers in Switzerland and the history of music in Zurich. He was appointed president of the Hindemith Foundation in 1985; having previously served on its board since 1968. He remained president until 1998. In 1995 he was the recipient of Yale University's Briner Certificate of Merit for his contributions to Hindemith scholarship.

Briner died in Zürich on 1 June 2014 at the age of 91.

== Honours ==
- 2006: Honorary Doctorate of the Faculty of Philosophy of the University of Zürich.

== Publications ==
- Der Wandel der Musik als Zeitkunst. Universal Edition, Vienna 1955 (Dissertation, Universität Zürich, 1953, als Versuch über die musikalische Zeitgestalt und ihre Wandlung in der europäischen Musik seit der mensuralen Mehrstimmigkeit).
- Paul Hindemith. Atlantis, Zürich und Freiburg, 1971.
- with Giselher Schubert, Dieter Rexroth: Paul Hindemith. Leben und Werk in Bild und Text. Schott, Mainz 1988, ISBN 3-7957-0204-6.
  In Italian: Paul Hindemith. Vita e opere. DeFerrari, Genua 1995, ISBN 88-7172-033-4.
- Musikalische Koexistenz. Editor Giselher Schubert. With a foreword by Hermann Danuser. Schott, Mainz 1993, ISBN 3-7957-1868-6.
