= Friedhelm Brusniak =

German music educator

Friedhelm Brusniak (born 1 October 1952) is a German music educator.

== Life ==
Born in Korbach, Brusniak studied at the humanistic branch of the Alte Landesschule Korbach. After graduating from high school, he studied school music at the Frankfurt University of Music and Performing Arts from 1971. His teachers were Branka Musulin and Poldi Mildner (piano), Richard Rudolf Klein (sound composition) and Helmuth Rilling (choir direction). He studied musicology with Lothar Hoffmann-Erbrecht and Ludwig Finscher as well as history at the Goethe University Frankfurt. In 1975/77, he passed the First Staatsexamen for teaching at grammar schools. In 1980, he was awarded a Dr. phil. He completed his practical training at the Studienseminar Kassel I (Gymnasium Bad Arolsen). After the Second State Examination in 1980 he was promoted from 1981 to 1988 then Akademischer Rat at the Chair of Musicology of the University of Augsburg (Franz Krautwurst). In 1988/89, he received a habilitation scholarship from the Deutsche Forschungsgemeinschaft. He then worked as a lecturer, student councilor and senior student councilor as well as substitute professor for music education at the University of Erlangen–Nuremberg (1988-1999) and at the Pädagogische Hochschule Heidelberg (1994/95).

In 1998, Brusniak was habilitated at the University of Augsburg for Musicology and was appointed a Privatdozent. In 1999, he was appointed to the professorship for music education and didactics of music education at the University of Würzburg, where he was also appointed first Chair holder for music education in 2004. From 1989 to 1999, he built up the singer museum of the Fränkischer Sängerbund in Feuchtwangen (successor institute of the former German Singer Museum in Nuremberg). Since 2010, he has been Scientific Director of the Foundation Documentation and Research Centre of the German Choral Industry. From 2010 to 2012, he was project manager "German Choral Studies" (Deutscher Chorverband). From 2011 to 2015, he held a guest professorship at the Akademia Pomorska w Słupsku. He retired on 1 April 2019. Since 2018, he has been president of the Franconian Singers' Association.

== Awards ==
- Silver Mozart Medal of the International Mozarteum Foundation (2003).
- Auszeichnung der Akademia Pomorska w Słupsku (2015).
