= Dieter Borchmeyer =

German literary critic (born 1941)

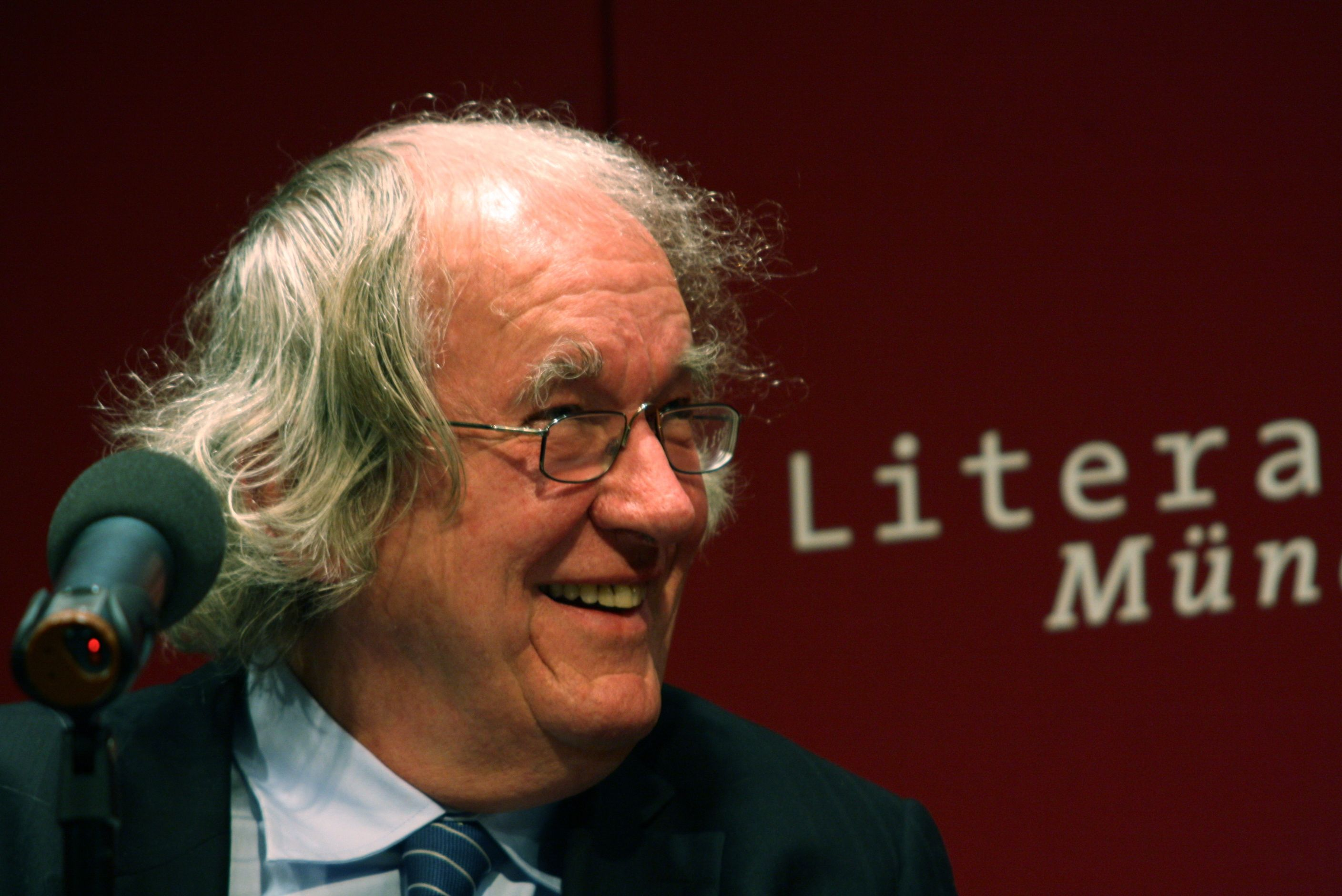
- Born: May 3, 1941 (age 85); Recklinghausen
- Occupations: Literary critic, Professor Emeritus of Modern German Literature and Dramatic Theory at Heidelberg University

Dieter Borchmeyer (born 3 May 1941 in Recklinghausen) is a German literary critic.

Borchmeyer is Professor Emeritus of Modern German Literature (Neuere Deutsche Literatur) and Dramatic Theory (Theaterwissenschaft) at Heidelberg University, where he is currently Seniorprofessor. Borchmeyer is president of the Bavarian Academy of Fine Arts. His principal fields are German literature from the 18th to the 20th century and music theatre. He has published on Goethe, Schiller, Mozart and Richard Wagner.

== Life ==
Borchmeyer began his study of German studies and Catholic Theology in 1961 at LMU Munich. After obtaining his doctorate in 1970, he taught from 1972 until 1979 at a Munich Gymnasium and simultaneously carried out teaching duties at the German Department of LMU Munich. After his Habilitation in 1979, he taught at the University of Erlangen and the University of Würzburg. In 1982, he was appointed to the Professorship of Dramatic Theory at LMU Munich. Since 1988, he is Professor of Modern German Literature (Neuere Deutsche Literatur) and Dramatic Theory (Theaterwissenschaft) at Heidelberg University.

In connection with the invitation to the pianist and musicologist Siegfried Mauser, who had been convicted by law, Borchmeyer was met with fierce criticism in the context of a planned event on the Heidelberg lectures on cultural theory.

== Works (selection) ==
I. Books

- Tragödie und Öffentlichkeit. Schillers Dramaturgie im Zusammenhang seiner ästhetisch-politischen Theorie und die rhetorische Tradition. München 1973 (Wilhelm Fink)
- Höfische Gesellschaft und Französische Revolution bei Goethe. Adeliges und bürgerliches Wertsystem im Urteil der Weimarer Klassik. Athenäum Verlag Kronberg/Ts. 1977
- Das Theater Richard Wagners. Idee – Dichtung – Wirkung. Stuttgart 1982 (Reclam)
- Richard Wagner – Theory and Theatre. Oxford 1991 (Oxford University Press)
- Weimarer Klassik. Portrait einer Epoche. Weinheim 1994. Bearb. Neuaufl. 1998 (Beltz / Athenäum)
- „Des Grauens Süße“. Annette von Droste-Hülshoff. München 1997 (Hanser). Neuauflage: Annette von Droste-Hülshoff. Darf nur heimlich lösen mein Haar. München 2003 (Deutscher Taschenbuch Verlag)
- Goethe. Der Zeitbürger. München 1999 (Hanser)
- Richard Wagner. Ahasvers Wandlungen. Frankfurt a.M. 2002 (Insel)
- Macht und Melancholie. Schillers Wallenstein. Überarbeitete Neuauflage mit einem Geleitwort v. Raymond Klibansky. Neckargemünd und Wien 2003 (Edition Mnemosyne)
- Drama and the World of Richard Wagner. Princeton University Press 2003
- Goethe (DuMont Schnellkurs). Köln 2005
- Mozart oder die Entdeckung der Liebe. Frankfurt a.M. 2005 (Insel)
- Nietzsche, Cosima, Wagner; Porträt einer Freundschaft. Frankfurt 2008 (Insel)

II. Editions

- Richard Wagner: Dichtungen und Schriften. Jubiläumsausgabe in 10 Bänden. Hrsg. [und kommentiert] von D.B. Frankfurt a.M. 1983 (Insel)
- Goethe: Dramen 1765–1775. Unter Mitarbeit von Peter Huber hrsg. [und kommentiert] von D.B. In. Goethe: Sämtliche Werke. Briefe, Tagebücher und Gespräche. I. Abt. Bd. 4. Frankfurt a.M. 1985
- Moderne Literatur in Grundbegriffen. Hrsg. von D.B. und Viktor Zmegac. Königstein/Ts. 1987 (Athenäum). Zweite, neubearbeitete Auflage, Tübingen 1994 (Niemeyer)
- Goethe: Dramen 1776–1790. Unter Mitarbeit von Peter Huber hrsg. [und kommentiert] von D.B. In: Goethe: Sämtliche Werke. Briefe, Tagebücher und Gespräche. I.Abt. Bd.5. Frankfurt a.M. 1988 (Deutscher Klassiker Verlag)
- Goethe: Werke. 6 Bde. Winkler Weltliteratur Dünndruck Ausgabe [neu hrsg., mit Geleitwort und Nachworten versehen von D.B.] München 1992 (Artemis & Winkler)
- Goethe: Dramen 1791–1832. Hrsg. v. D.B. und Peter Huber. In: In: Goethe: Sämtliche Werke. Briefe, Tagebücher und Gespräche. I.Abt. Bd. 6. Frankfurt a.M. 1993 (Deutscher Klassiker Verlag)
- Nietzsche und Wagner. Stationen einer epochalen Begegnung. 2 Bde. Hrsg. von D. B. und Jörg Salaquarda. Frankfurt a.M. 1994 (Insel)
- Richard Wagner. Der Ring des Nibelungen. Ansichten des Mythos. Hrsg. v. Udo Bermbach und D.B.. Stuttgart 1995 (Metzler)
- Franz Wilhelm Beidler: Cosima Wagner. Ein Porträt. Richard Wagners erster Enkel: Ausgewählte Schriften und Briefwechsel mit Thomas Mann. Hrsg., komm. u. mit einem biographischen Essay v. D.B. 3. Aufl. Würzburg 2011 (Königshausen & Neumann)
- Richard Wagner und die Juden. Hrsg. v. D.B., Ami Maayani u. Susanne Vill. Stuttgart/Weimar 2000
- Johann Wolfgang von Goethe: Faust. Sämtliche Dichtungen. Mit einem Nachwort von D.B.. Düsseldorf u. Zürich 2003 (Artemis & Winkler))
- Der Ernstfall. Martin Walsers „Tod eines Kritikers“. Hrsg. v. D.B. / Helmuth Kiesel. Hamburg 2003.
- Mozarts Opern. Das Handbuch. Hrsg. von D.B. u. Gernot Gruber. 2 Teilbände. Laaber 2007 (Laaber)

III. Festschrift

- Getauft auf Musik. Hrsg. v. Udo Bermbach und Hans Rudolf Vaget (mit Auswahlbibliographie). Würzburg 2006 (Königshausen und Neumann).
