= Johann Sonnleitner =

Austrian musician

Johann Sonnleitner (born 1941) is an Austrian music educator and expert as interpreter of early music on historical keyboard instruments. He is an organist, a harpsichordist and music historian.

== Life and career ==
Born in Trofaiach, Sonnleitner studied organ at the University of Music and Performing Arts Vienna with Alois Forer, harpsichord with Eta Harich-Schneider and school music as well as history and pedagogy at the University of Vienna. He completed his education by attending master classes with Gustav Leonhardt, Anton Heiller, Luigi Ferdinando Tagliavini, Marie-Claire Alain, Cor Kee among others. He also is an international concert musician as soloist, chamber music partner and song accompanist.

He began teaching improvisation and score playing at the Vienna Musikhochschule and continued with a six-year assistant to Nikolaus Harnoncourt at the Mozarteum Salzburg. In 1979, he came to the Zurich University of the Arts as a teacher for historical keyboard instruments. From 1983 to 2003, he taught regularly at the teaching and research institute Schola Cantorum Basiliensis. For more than two decades, Sonnleitner led the master classes for keyboard instruments within the Innsbrucker Festwochen der Alten Musik.

Margarete Kopelent, Marie-Louise Dähler, Yasunori Imamura and Naoki Kitaya were among those who studied with Sonnleitner, and he taught courses to artists like Oscar Milani, Christine Schornsheim and Gudrun Schaumann.

He has published his teaching and research activities in the field of performance practice (especially with regard to historical tempo and metronome indications) in a series of essays and together with the musicologist Clemens-Christoph von Gleich in the study work Bach: Wie schnell?

Sonnleitner is known for numerous premieres of new organ and harpsichord music as a member of the Viennese ensemble Die Reihe of Friedrich Cerha, and uses music in an extended tonality, inspired by the compositions and research work of Heiner Ruland. Sonnleitner composes Lieder, choral works, chamber music and music for 24-tone keyboard instruments (Quarter tone).

== Work ==
Cantatas

- Die Oelberg-Apokalypse
- Der himmlische Reiter
- Die Waffenrüstung Gottes

Vesper

- An der Schwelle des Abends

Oratorium

- Klingendes Licht
- Das Traumlied des Olaf Astenson

== Publications ==
- Die Geschäfte des Herrn Robert Hohlbaum die Schriftstellerkarriere eines Österreichers in der Zwischenkriegszeit und im Dritten Reich.
- Entwicklungsplanung für ein kooperatives System der Erwachsenenbildung in Österreich Projekt 12. Entwicklungsplan für Öffentliche Büchereien / von Johann Sonnleitner. [Projektträger: Büchereiverband Österreichs].
