= Carol J. Oja =

American musicologist (born 1953)

Carol J. Oja (born 1953 in Hibbing, Minnesota) is a musicologist and scholar of American Studies. In 2024, she was elected to the American Philosophical Society.

== Biography ==
Since 2003, she has held the post of William Powell Mason Professor at Harvard University. She has served as the Leonard Bernstein Scholar-in-Residence with the New York Philharmonic. Her previous appointments have been at the College of William and Mary (1997–2003) and the City University of New York (1988–97), where she was professor of music at Brooklyn College and the Graduate Center, as well as director of the Institute for Studies in American Music (1993–97). She attended St. Olaf College (B.A.), the University of Iowa (M.A.), and the Graduate School of the City University of New York (Ph.D.).

Her main fields of study include 20th-century American modernism, musical theater, and cross-cultural composition, and her work positions composers and their music within broad historical contexts. She often explores sites of musical intersection and hybridity, whether having to do with race, genre, cultural hierarchy, or geographic origin, and she probes institutional frameworks for music-making, as well as patronage (especially by women). The composers she has written about include Leonard Bernstein, Aaron Copland, Henry Cowell, George Gershwin, Colin McPhee, Ruth Crawford Seeger, William Grant Still, and Virgil Thomson.

Oja was president of the Society for American Music (2003–05) and has chaired the Pulitzer Prize Committee in Music twice. Together with Judith Clurman, she directed the Harvard festival, "Leonard Bernstein: Boston to Broadway" in 2006.

Oja married musicologist and jazz pianist Mark Tucker, author of Ellington: The Early Years and The Duke Ellington Reader. Together with her husband and Lucius Wyatt (Prairie View A&M University) she established the Cultural Diversity Committee of the American Musicological Society. Tucker died in 2000. The Mark Tucker Award of the Society for American Music is named after him. Oja established the Mark Tucker Fund for Jazz Research Materials at the Center for Black Music Research.

== Awards and honors ==
Oja is recipient of a Guggenheim Fellowship, the Lowens Book Award from the Society for American Music, three separate ASCAP-Deems Taylor Book Awards, and an award for "Best Reference Book" from the Music Library Association. She also received the Everett S. Mendelsohn Excellence in Mentoring Award from Harvard's Graduate School of Arts and Sciences.

== Books ==
Her principal books include:

- Sounding Together: Collaborative Perspectives on U.S. Music in the 21st Century, edited with Charles Hiroshi Garrett (Ann Arbor: University of Michigan Press, 2021). Open-access: https://doi.org/10.3998/mpub.11374592.
- Out of Bounds: Ethnography, History, Music; Essays in Honor of Kay Kaufman Shelemay, edited with Ingrid T. Monson and Richard K. Wolf (Cambridge, MA: Harvard University Press, 2017).
- Bernstein Meets Broadway: Collaborative Art in a Time of War (2014)
- Crosscurrents: American and European Music in Interaction, 1900-2000, edited with Felix Meyer, Wolfgang Rathert, and Anne C. Shreffler (2014)
- Aaron Copland and His World, edited with Judith Tick (2005)
- Making Music Modern: New York in the 1920s (2000)
- Colin McPhee: Composer in Two Worlds (1990)
- A Celebration of American Music: Words and Music in Honor of H. Wiley Hitchcock, edited with Richard Crawford and R. Allen Lott (1990)
- American Music Recordings: A Discography of 20th-Century U.S. Composers (1982)
- Stravinsky in "Modern Music" (1924–1946) (1982)
