= Gollner =

Gollner is a surname. Notable people with the surname include:

- Adam Gollner (born 1976), Canadian writer and musician
- Manfred Gollner (born 1990), Austrian footballer
- Monika Gollner (born 1974), Austrian high jumper
- Theodor Göllner (1929–2022), German musicologist
