= Christian Martin Schmidt =

German musicologist and music theorist (1942–2024)

Christian Martin Schmidt (10 November 1942 – 16 October 2024) was a German musicologist and music theorist.

== Life and career ==
Born in Dessau, Schmidt studied musicology from 1963 at the University of Hamburg, as well as in Tübingen, Paris, Göttingen and Berlin. In 1970 he received his doctorate at the FU Berlin from Rudolf Stephan.

Subsequently, Schmidt worked on the Arnold Schönberg complete edition. After his habilitation (with an analytical work on Schönberg's Moses und Aron) and a professorship in Amsterdam, he held the chair of Music history at Technische Universität Berlin from 1991 until his emeritus as successor to Carl Dahlhaus.

From 1992 he was project manager of the Leipzig Edition of the Works of Felix Mendelssohn Bartholdy at the Saxon Academy of Sciences and Humanities.

A further focus of his work, besides the music history of the 19th and 20th centuries, is the work of Johannes Brahms.

Schmidt died on 16 October 2024, at the age of 81.

== Publications ==
- Verfahren der motivisch-thematischen Vermittlung in der Musik von Johannes Brahms dargestellt an der Klarinettensonate f-Moll, op. 120/1. Munich 1971 (Berliner musikwissenschaftliche Arbeiten. 2).
- Schönbergs Oper "Moses und Aron". Mainz 1988.
- Johannes Brahms. Stuttgart 1994 (Reclam Musikführer).
- with Giselher Schubert, Constantin Floros: Johannes Brahms – die Sinfonien. Einführung, Kommentar, Analyse. Schott, Mainz 1998, ISBN 3-7957-8711-4.
- Music Analysis: not Universal, not Almighty, but Indispensable. In Music Analysis. 21, 2002, special edition, pp. 23–27.
