= Hunter from Elsewhere – A Journey with Helen Britton =

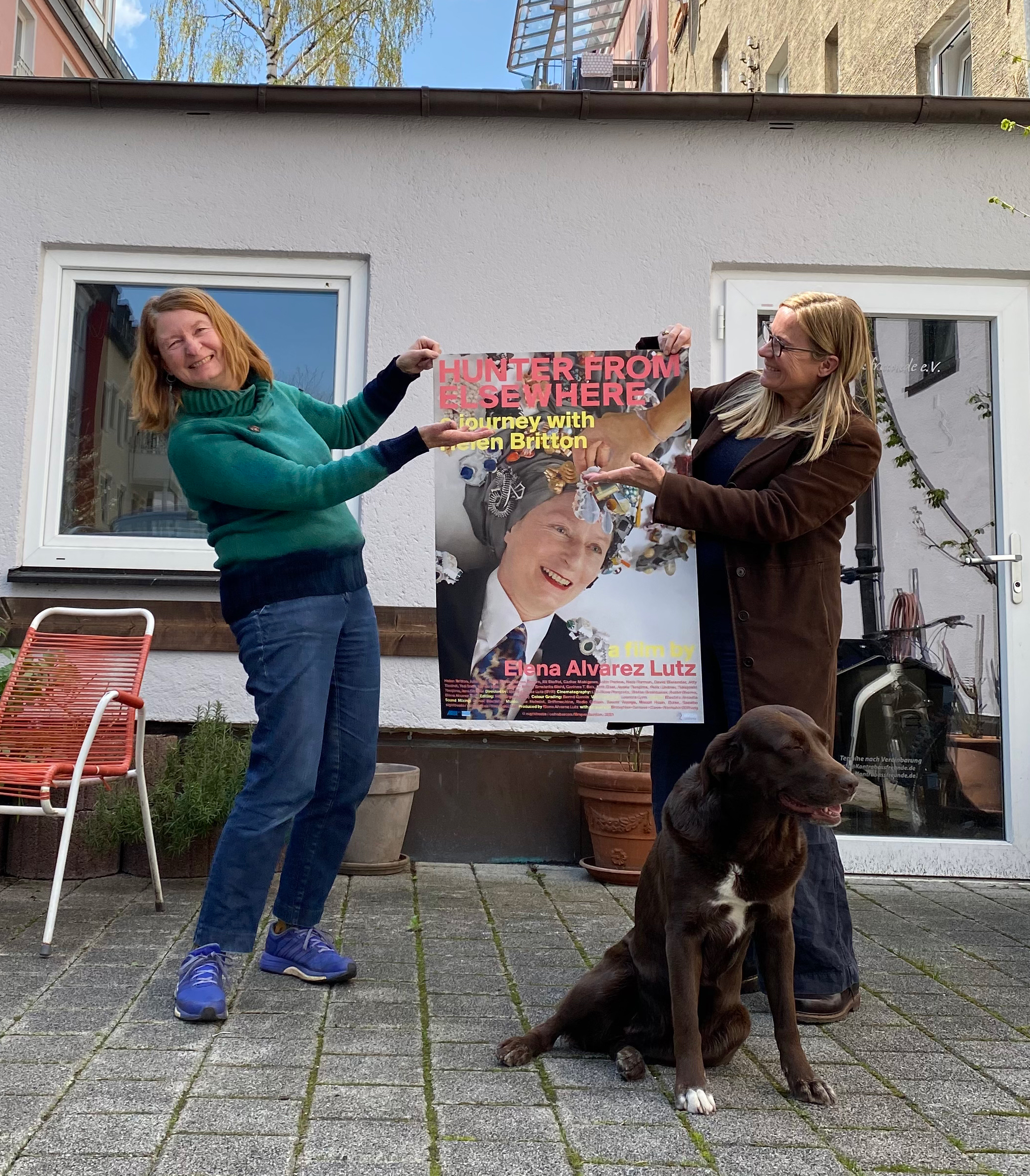
- Helen Britton (left) and Elena Alvarez with the film poster (2021)
- Directed by: Elena Alvarez Lutz
- Produced by: ochobarcos / eightboats filmproduction e.K.
- Narrated by: Leoncia Flynn
- Cinematography: Elena Alvarez Lutz, Lilli-Rose Pongratz, Stefan Brainbauer, Robin Worms
- Music by: The Notwist, Driftmachine, Radio Citizen, Mount Hush, Sasebo, Sound Voyage
- Release date: 2021
- Running time: 97 minutes
- Country: Germany
- Language: English

Hunter from Elsewhere – A Journey with Helen Britton is a German documentary that premiered at Munich's DOK.fest and was screened at the 38th Kassel Dokfest in 2021. Filmmaker Elena Alvarez Lutz traces the career of artist Helen Britton, interviews companions, and accompanies Britton on her travels. The artist is shown in her studio in Munich, during exhibition preparations, and in doing research on old traditions of jewelry. This gradually creates an impression of Britton's creative process and her artistic motivation.

In the US, the film was shown for the first time during NYC Jewelry Week 2022. In Australia it premiered during Melbourne Design Week 2023. In March 2024 the film was released in German cinemas.

== Synopsis ==
The film accompanies Helen Britton on her worldwide search for precious or everyday materials from which she makes jewelry, sculptures and other objects. She is shown walking on the beach, at flea markets, and exploring an abandoned house. At numerous occasions she is filmed documenting her findings with her own camera. Britton's career is recounted: she grew up in Newcastle in New South Wales where she was able to observe how ore was first mined and then processed for shipbuilding. The industrial environment shaped her artistically; she not only took up photography and drawing but also making jewelry objects from simple materials. Around 2000 she moved to Munich to study at the Academy of Fine Arts with Otto Künzli, a student of Hermann Jünger. Today she is considered one of the most famous jewelry artists in the world. During the individual episodes of the film, companions, curators, collectors, and friends have their say. In Idar-Oberstein, which was once world-famous for gemstone jewelry, and in the Thuringian Forest in Lauscha, Britton takes up the trail of almost forgotten traditions of gemstone and jewelry processing. She is shown in conversation with craftsmen and in the search and finding of gemstones such as jasper or agate, which are hardly used any more. The last part of the film shows Britton at work in her Munich studio, preparing a retrospective and talking to curators. During the film, partly fictional texts written by Alvarez Lutz can be heard as voiceovers, the speaker is Leoncia Flynn.

== Production ==
Elena Alvarez accompanied Helen Britton over a period of four years. Alvarez chose the title because Britton not only collects materials, but also displays the instinct of a hunter. To realize the film, Alvarez, too, needed this hunting instinct.

== Reception ==
Dunja Bialas compares Alvarez's way of working with that of Britton, who once had translated the film Marius and Jeannette into a piece of jewelry made of a toothbrush. The director only works in the opposite direction and transforms Britton's jewelry into a film. With their work, both artists ensure that the audience's view of the seemingly worthless is altered.

In her review on Bayerischer Rundfunk, Julie Metzdorf calls Hunter from Elsewhere an "amazing film" as it tells "stories about telling stories" and "in its slightly melancholic basic mood irretrievably negotiates the past and yet stands completely in the here and now".
