= Thrasybulos Georgiades =

Greek musicologist

Thrasybulos Georgios Georgiades (Greek: Θρασύβουλος Γεωργιάδης; Athens, 4 January 1907 – Munich, 15 March 1977) was a Greek musicologist, pianist, civil engineer and philosopher. He was director of the Institute of Musicology at the Ludwig-Maximilians-Universität München for many years, and he is widely regarded as one of the greatest German musicologists.

== Life ==
Georgiades grew up as a dedicated pianist, making advanced studies at Athens Conservatoire, and completing his education at the Ludwig-Maximilians-Universität München (1930–1935) under Carl Orff. He did structural engineering studies at Athens Polytechnic, specializing in the building of bridges. According to some colleagues, "In his work as a musicologist also, he succeeded in forming many unexpected links" – with the philosophy of Heidegger and Gadamer for instance – or in establishing musical connections between Classical Antiquity and the Modern Era, between Greek and German music, or between non-European and Central European music.

In June 1935, he obtained his PhD in Munich, under the supervision of Rudolf von Ficker, with a thesis on the development of polyphony in the Middle Ages. In 1936, he married harpsichordist Anna Barbara Speckner. In 1938, Georgiades became professor at the Athens Conservatoire, and its director the following year. In 1947, he received his habilitation from Heidelberg University with his "Observations on Ancient Metrical Quantity" (Bemerkungen zur antiken Quantitätsmetrik), a work on ancient Greek rhythms.

Georgiades was succeeded in his research by his colleague Theodor Göllner.

== Awards ==
- 1974 Pour le Mérite
- Knight Commander's Cross of the Order of Merit of the Federal Republic of Germany

== Selected works ==
=== In English translation ===
- Greek Music, Verse, and Dance, New York, Merlin Press, 1956.
- Music and Language: The Rise of Western Music as Exemplified in Settings of the Mass, Cambridge University Press, 1982.

=== In original German ===
- Englische Diskanttraktate aus der ersten Hälfte des 15. Jahrhunderts: Untersuchungen zur Entwicklung der Mehrstimmigkeit im Mittelalter. Musikwissenschaftliches Seminar der Universität München, München 1937.
- Der griechische Rhythmus: Musik, Reigen, Vers und Sprache. Schröder, Hamburg 1949 (ursprünglich Habilitationsschrift der Universität München als: Bemerkungen zur antiken Quantitätsmetrik, 1947).
- Musik und Sprache: Das Werden der abendländischen Musik dargestellt an der Vertonung der Messe. Mit zahlreichen Notenbeispielen. Springer, Berlin/Göttingen 1954 (diverse Neuauflagen).
- Musik und Rhythmus bei den Griechen: Zum Ursprung der abendländischen Musik. Rowohlt, Hamburg 1958 (several reprints).
- Sakral und Profan in der Musik. Hueber. München 1960.
- Musik und Schrift. Oldenbourg, München 1962.
- Das musikalische Theater. Verlag der Bayerischen Akademie der Wissenschaften, München 1965.
- Kleine Schriften. Schneider, Tutzing 1977.
- Schubert: Musik und Lyrik. Vandenhoeck und Ruprecht, Göttingen 1967 (several reprints).
- Nennen und Erklingen: Die Zeit als Logos. Vandenhoeck und Ruprecht, Göttingen 1985.
- Rhythmus – Sprache – Music, Hartmut Schick, Alexander Erhard (eds.), Schneider Verlag, 2011.
