= Mario Raskin =

Argentine harpsichordist

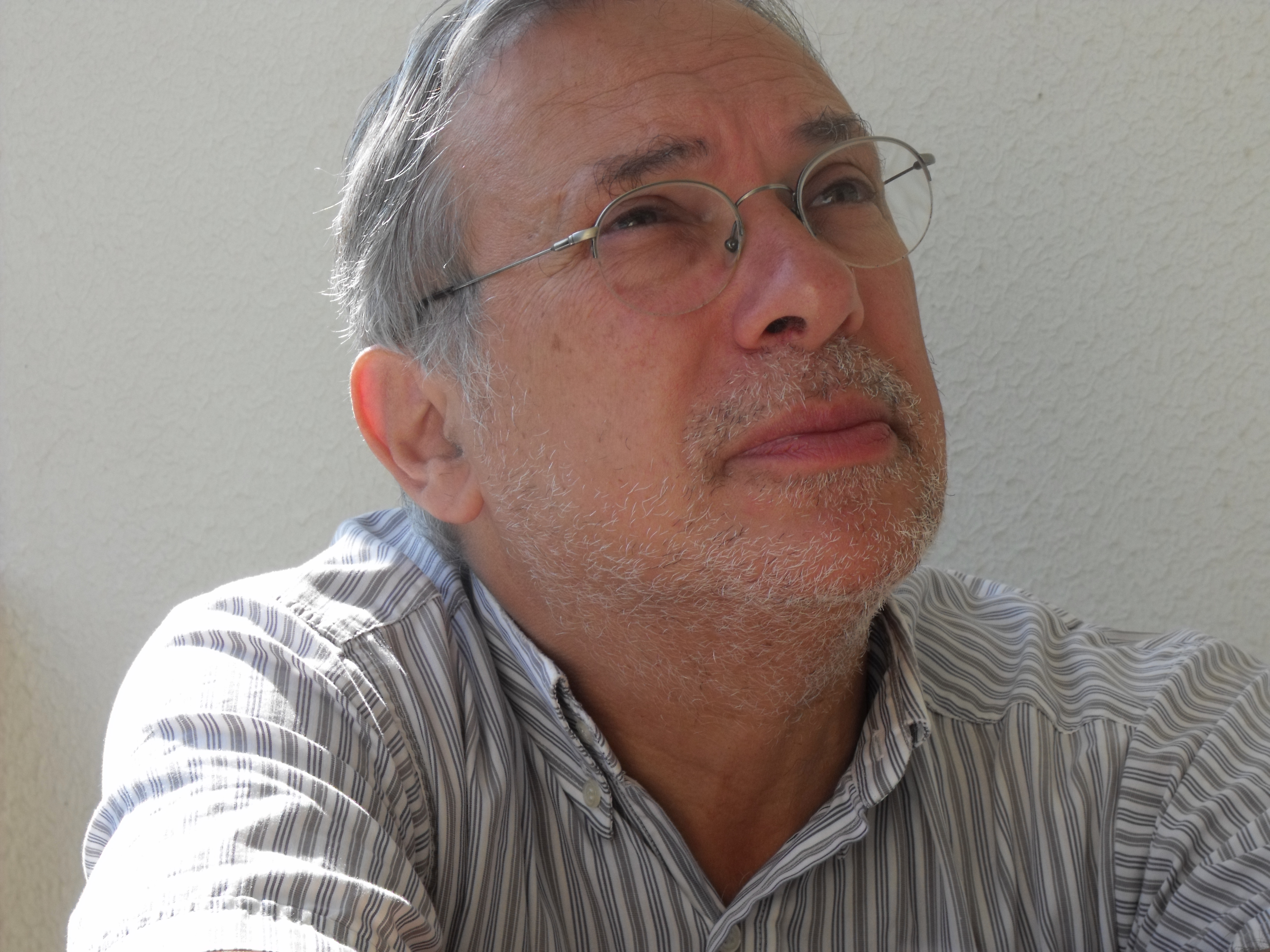
- Mario Raskin in 2019

Background information
- Born: 1951 (age 74–75); Buenos Aires, Argentina
- Instrument: Harpsichord

Mario Raskin (born 1951) is an Argentine harpsichordist. He was born in Buenos Aires and lives in Paris, France.

== Background ==
Raskin was born in Buenos Aires, and studied music at the National Conservatory of Buenos Aires. He developed an interest in the harpsichord and chose it early in his studies as his primary instrument. He also studied harmony, counterpoint, analysis and composition. He was a fellow of the Fundación Bariloche, where he received instruction from Monica Cosachov.

In 1978 he met Rafael Puyana in Buenos Aires and was offered an internship at the Festival of Granada and Saint Jacques de Compostela. He then moved to Paris to continue his training with the Colombian harpsichordist. In 1980, during a workshop given by Kenneth Gilbert and Scott Ross, he was invited to continue his studies at Laval University in Quebec, and he went on to obtain a Masters in Performance from Laval University in 1983.

== Music career ==
After completing his studies, Raskin returned to Paris in 1983 to pursue a career as a harpsichord soloist and chamber musician. He has recently performed recitals and conducted master classes in Skopje and Buenos Aires. He has also appeared in Montreal, Barcelona, Alcala de Henares, Malta, Brussels and in several cities in France. He became the first Argentine harpsichordist to participate in the Festival van Vlaanderen competition in Bruges.

With harpsichordist Oscar Milani, Raskin has formed a duo that records and performs regularly in concert. Part of their program includes transcripts of works by Piazzolla and Bach performed on two harpsichords.

Raskin teaches harpsichord at the music school at Joinville-le-Pont. He was also the artistic director of "Season Montsoreau Musical" (Maine et Loire), created in 1996, for seven years.

Raskin has recorded works by Duphly, Forqueray, Soler, Bach, Boutmy, Royer and Tangos by Piazzolla for two harpsichords.
