= Hermann Danuser =

Swiss-German musicologist

Hermann Danuser (born 3 October 1946) is a Swiss-German musicologist.

== Life ==
Born in Frauenfeld, Danuser studied piano, oboe, musicology, philosophy and German language and literature at the Musikhochschule and the University of Zurich from 1965; he received his doctorate with a dissertation on musical prose. From 1973 he studied in Berlin with Carl Dahlhaus (musicology) and Gerhard Puchelt (piano). After working as a research assistant, he habilitated in 1982 at Technische Universität Berlin with a thesis on the music of the 20th century (published in 1984). From 1982 to 1988, Danuser taught as professor for musicology at the Hochschule für Musik, Theater und Medien Hannover, then from 1988 to 1993 as professor for musicology at the Albert-Ludwigs-University Freiburg. From 1993 until his retirement in 2014, he held the chair for Historical Musicology at the Institute for Musicology and Media Studies of the Humboldt University of Berlin.

Danuser also coordinates research at the Paul-Sacher-Stiftung Basel; from 1996 to 2017 he was member of the board of trustees of the Ernst von Siemens Musikstiftung. He has held guest professorships at several leading universities in Europe and the USA. In the academic year 2017/18 he taught at the Central Conservatory of Music in Beijing.

== Research ==
Danuser's research focuses on music history of the 18th to 20th centuries, musical interpretation, the more recent history of music theory and aesthetics of music, and music analysis; he combines work analysis, music-aesthetic discourse formation, biography, genre and institutional history. In studies on avant-garde, nationalism, poetics, aesthetics and historiography he draws on transdisciplinary approaches. His most recent and currently ongoing research projects deal with the interaction of factors aesthetic to autonomy and heteronomy in the musical work of art (monograph Weltanschauungsmusik, 2009, with analyses, etc.) on Beethoven's Symphony No. 9, on Music of Spheres (Sfærernes Musik) by Rued Langgaard and on Hindemith's opera Die Harmonie der Welt), the conceptual history of musical performance since the 18th century (sponsored by the Deutsche Forschungsgemeinschaft) as well as manifestations of musical self-reference (monograph Metamusik, 2017). Danuser's extensive publishing and editorial activities make him one of the most important German-speaking musicologists of the present day.

== Honours ==
Danuser is a full member of the Berlin-Brandenburg Academy of Sciences and Humanities and a Corresponding Member of the American Musicological Society. In 2005, the Royal Holloway of the University of London awarded him the title of Doctor of Music honoris causa for his scientific merits; a further honorary doctorate was conferred on him in 2014 by the National University of Music Bucharest. In 2015 he was elected to the American Academy of Arts and Sciences.

== Publications ==
=== Monographs ===
- Musikalische Prosa. Studien zur Musikgeschichte des 19. Jahrhunderts. Vol. 46. Regensburg: Bosse. 1975. ISBN 3-7649-2113-7.
- Die Musik des 20. Jahrhunderts. Neues Handbuch der Musikwissenschaft. Vol. 7. Laaber: Laaber-Verlag. 1984. ISBN 3-89007-037-X.
- Gustav Mahler: Das Lied von der Erde. Meisterwerke der Musik. Vol. 25. München: Fink. 1986. ISBN 3-7705-1741-5.
- Gustav Mahler und seine Zeit. Große Komponisten und ihre Zeit. Laaber: Laaber-Verlag. 1991. ISBN 3-921518-91-1.
- Weltanschauungsmusik. Schliengen: Edition Argus. 2009. ISBN 978-3-931264-75-8.
- Metamusik. Schliengen: Edition Argus. 2017. ISBN 978-3-931264-79-6.

=== Editions of musical works ===
- Paul Hindemith (1993). Streicherkammermusik II. Paul Hindemith: Sämtliche Werke. Vol. Serie V, Band 5. Mainz: B. Schott’s Söhne. OCLC 803579620.
- Paul Hindemith (2002). Sonate für Violine allein op. 11 Nr. 6. Mainz: Schott. ISMN 979-0-001-13103-2.

=== Published writings ===
==== Series and journals ====
- Peter Cahn; Hermann Danuser; Renate Groth; Giselher Schubert (eds.). "Musiktheorie. Zeitschrift für Musikwissenschaft". Musiktheorie. Laaber: Laaber-Verlag. ISSN 0177-4182.
- Carl Dahlhaus; Hermann Danuser, eds. (1996). Neues Handbuch der Musikwissenschaft. Vol. 2, 3. Laaber: Laaber-Verlag. ISBN 3-89007-030-2.
- Aleida Assmann; Hermann Danuser; Manfred Fuhrmann; Wolfgang Kemp; Renate Lachmann; Helmut Pfeiffer; Wolfgang Preisendanz; Jurij Striedter (eds.). Theorie und Geschichte der Literatur und der schönen Künste. München: Fink.
- Rainer Cadenbach; Hermann Danuser; Albrecht Riethmüller; Christian Martin Schmidt (eds.). Berliner Musik Studien; Schriftenreihe zur Musikwissenschaft an den Berliner Hochschulen und Universitäten. Köln: Studio-Verlag.
- Udo Bermbach; Dieter Borchmeyer; Hermann Danuser; Sven Friedrich; Hans Rudolf Vaget (eds.). wagnerspectrum. Würzburg: Königshausen & Neumann. ISSN 1614-9459.

==== Private editions ====
- Dietrich Kämper; Paul Terse, eds. (1987). Amerikanische Musik seit Charles Ives. Laaber: Laaber-Verlag. ISBN 3-89007-117-1.
- Gattungen der Musik und ihre Klassiker im Wandel der Geschichte. Publikationen der Hochschule für Musik und Theater Hannover. Vol. 1. Laaber: Laaber-Verlag. 1988. ISBN 3-89007-114-7.
- Helga de la Motte-Haber; Silke Leopold; Norbert Miller, eds. (1988). Das musikalische Kunstwerk. Geschichte – Ästhetik – Theorie. Laaber: Laaber-Verlag. ISBN 3-89007-144-9.
- Gustav Mahler. Wege der Forschung. Vol. 653. Darmstadt: Wissenschaftliche Buchgesellschaft. 1992. ISBN 3-534-02368-4.
- Musikalische Interpretation. Neues Handbuch der Musikwissenschaft. Vol. 11. Laaber: Laaber-Verlag. 1992. ISBN 3-89007-041-8.
- Günter Katzenberger, ed. (1993). Vom Einfall zum Kunstwerk. Der Kompositionsprozeß in der Musik des 20. Jahrhunderts. Publikationen der Hochschule für Musik und Theater Hannover. Vol. 4. Laaber: Laaber-Verlag. ISBN 3-89007-258-5.
- Gianmario Borio, ed. (1997). Im Zenit der Moderne. Die Internationalen Ferienkurse für Neue Musik Darmstadt 1946–1966. Rombach Wissenschaft: Reihe musicae. Vol. 2. Freiburg i. Br.: Rombach. ISBN 3-7930-9138-4.
- Tobias Plebuch, ed. (1998). Musik als Text. Kassel: Bärenreiter. ISBN 3-7618-1403-8.
- Hans-Joachim Hinrichsen; Tobias Plebuch (eds.). Carl Dahlhaus. Gesammelte Schriften in 10 Bänden (2000–2008). Redaction: Burkhard Meischein. Laaber: Laaber-Verlag. ISBN 3-89007-235-6.
- Hermann Gottschewski, ed. (2003). Amerikanismus – Americanism – Weill. Die Suche nach kultureller Identität in der Moderne. Schliengen: Edition Argus. ISBN 3-931264-23-8.
- Matthias Kassel, ed. (2003). Musiktheater heute. Veröffentlichungen der Paul Sacher Stiftung. Vol. 9. Mainz: Schott. ISBN 3-7957-0481-2.
- Musikalische Lyrik. Handbuch der musikalischen Gattungen. Vol. 8.1 u. 8.2. Laaber: Laaber-Verlag. 2004. 971462682.
- Peter Gülke; Norbert Miller, eds. (2011). Carl Dahlhaus und die Musikwissenschaft. Werk, Wirkung, Aktualität. Schliengen: Edition Argus. ISBN 978-3-931264-76-5.
- Heidy Zimmermann, ed. (2013). Avatar of Modernity: The Rite of Spring reconsidered. London: Boosey & Hawkes. ISBN 978-0-851628-23-3.
- Matthias Kassel, ed. (2017). Wessen Klänge? Über Autorschaft in neuer Musik. Veröffentlichungen der Paul Sacher Stiftung. Vol. 12. Mainz: Schott. ISBN 978-3-7957-1173-3.

=== Lectures, essays and articles ===
Hundreds of essays and articles in specialist periodicals and reference works, introductions, forewords and epilogues, honours, newspaper articles and much more a.m. A selection of 125 texts has been published in a four-volume edition (arranged under the volume titles "Theory", "Aesthetics", "Historiography" and "Analysis"):

- Hans-Joachim Hinrichsen; Christian Schaper; Laure Spaltenstein, eds. (2014). Gesammelte Vorträge und Aufsätze. Schliengen: Edition Argus. ISBN 978-3-931264-78-9.

== Dedicated works ==
- Dmitri Shostakovich (2006). Tahiti-Trott (Tea for two by Vincent Youmans) Op. 16. Hamburg: Sikorski. ISBN 3-935196-78-4.
- Camilla Bork; Tobias Robert Klein; Burkhard Meischein; Andreas Meyer; Tobias Plebuch, eds. (2011). Ereignis und Exegese. Musikalische Interpretation – Interpretation der Musik. Schliengen: Edition Argus. ISBN 978-3-931264-77-2.
- Paul Sacher Stiftung, ed. (2017). On revient toujours. Dokumente zur Schönberg-Rezeption aus der Paul Sacher Stiftung. Mainz: Schott Music. ISBN 978-3-7957-1202-0.
