= Anne C. Shreffler =

American musicologist (born 1957)

- Born: February 17, 1957 (age 69); Baton Rouge, Louisiana, U.S.
- Occupation: Musicologist
- Awards: Guggenheim Fellowship (2007)

Academic background
- Education: New England Conservatory of Music; Harvard University
- Thesis: Webern's Trakl settings (1989)
- Doctoral advisor: Reinhold Brinkmann

Academic work
- Discipline: Musicology
- Sub-discipline: 20th-century avant-garde music
- Institutions: University of Chicago; University of Basel; Harvard University

Anne Chatoney Shreffler (born February 17, 1957) is an American musicologist who specializes in 20th-century avant-garde music. A 2007 Guggenheim Fellow, she is author of Webern and the Lyric Impulse (1994) and Elliot Carter: A Centennial Portrait in Letters and Documents (2008), as well as James Edward Ditson Professor of Music at Harvard University.

== Biography ==
Anne Chatoney Shreffler was born on February 17, 1957, in Baton Rouge, Louisiana, and she graduated from Kinder High School for the Performing and Visual Arts in 1975. She originally studied music at the New England Conservatory of Music, where she obtained her Bachelor of Music (1979) degree in flute, before switching to an academic path and obtaining her Master of Music (1981) degree in music theory.

In 1989, Shreffler obtained her PhD from Harvard University; her doctoral dissertation Webern's Trakl settings was supervised by Reinhold Brinkmann. The same year, she began working at the University of Chicago as an assistant professor of music. In 1994, she left for the Musicological Institute of the University of Basel, where she subsequently became associate professor of music and in 1997 was promoted to full professor. In 2003, she returned to Harvard and became the James Edward Ditson Professor of Music there.

Shreffler specializes in 20th-century avant-garde music. In addition to writing her dissertation on Anton Webern, she also wrote a book on him, Webern and the Lyric Impulse (1994), and she won the 1995 Alfred Einstein Award on an article about his use of the twelve-tone technique. In 2007, she was awarded a Guggenheim Fellowship for "a study of new music, avant-garde, and politics in the early Cold War". In 2008, she was co-author of Elliott Carter: A Centennial Portrait in Letters and Documents, which uses primary sources like letters and documents to explore the life and career Elliott Carter. In 2009, she was co-editor of a special issue of Musiktheorie: Zeitschrift für Musikwissenschaft themed after violinist Rudolf Kolisch. In 2014, she was one of the four co-editors of Crosscurrents: American and European Music Interaction, 1900–2000, a volume about the historical relationship between European and North American music.

== Bibliography ==
- Webern and the Lyric Impulse (1994)
- (with Felix Meyer) Elliot Carter: A Centennial Portrait in Letters and Documents (2008)
- (ed. with Felix Meyer, Carol J. Oja, Wolfgang Rathert) Crosscurrents: American and European Music Interaction, 1900–2000 (2014)
