= Christine Schornsheim =

German harpsichordist and pianist

Christine Schornsheim, married name Christine Engelmayr (born in 1959), is a German harpsichordist and pianist.

== Life and career ==
Schornsheim attended the Musikgymnasium Carl Philipp Emanuel Bach (East Berlin) from 1969 to 1976 and studied piano at the local East Berlin arts university until 1982. From 1982 to 1983 she was solo répétiteur at the Hans Otto Theater in Potsdam. She participated in master classes given by Gustav Leonhardt, Ton Koopman, Johann Sonnleitner and Andreas Staier. She made her debut in 1994 as a song accompanist to Peter Schreier also on the fortepiano.

From 1988 to 1992 she held a teaching position for harpsichord and basso continuo at the University of Music and Theatre Leipzig, where she was appointed professor for harpsichord and fortepiano in 1992. In 2002 she was appointed professor for harpsichord at the University of Music and Performing Arts Munich. Here she became the victim of an act of sexual assault by the president of the university, Siegfried Mauser. He was sentenced to several years' imprisonment for this.

In addition to solo concerts, she often performs in a duo with Andreas Staier and can be heard as harpsichordist of the Berliner Barock-Compagney and the Münchner Cammer-Music.

Her most important recordings include works by Johann Sebastian Bach such as the Goldberg Variations and various piano concertos by Wolfgang Amadeus Mozart. Together with Christoph Huntgeburth she also recorded works by Ludwig van Beethoven for flute and piano. In 1999 she received the ECHO Klassik for the recording of three harpsichord concertos by Carl Philipp Emanuel Bach, Wilhelm Friedemann Bach and Johann Christian Bach. Her complete recording of the piano works of Joseph Haydn on 14 CDs was completed in 2005.

Schornsheim is married to the Röttenbacher family doctor and medical functionary Ernst Engelmayr (* 1949).
