= Josse Boutmy =

Belgian composer (1697–1779)

Josse Boutmy (1 February 1697 – 27 November 1779) was a composer, organist and harpsichordist of the Austrian Netherlands who established himself in Brussels.

== Background ==
Boutmy was born in Ghent. He was born into a musical family; his grandfather, father, brother and sons were all musicians, also called the Boutmy Dynasty.

He worked with Anselm Franz, 2nd Prince of Thurn and Taxis (1736) and at the chapel royal of Brussels (1744-1777). Boutmy married a woman named Katrina from Westphalia.

Although Boutmy was a court organist and famous in his day, he was reduced at the age of eighty to appeals for charity and petitioned the court for retirement. He died in Brussels, without receiving a pension, leaving his wife and twelve children, who also petitioned the court for charity.

== Works ==
Boutmy composed three collections of pieces for the harpsichord:

- First book (1738)
- Second book (1738)
- Third book, dedicated to governor Charles of Lorraine (ca. 1749)

His style incorporates multiple European influences: French (Rameau, Duphly), Italian (Domenico Scarlatti), German (Carl Philipp Emanuel Bach) and his harpsichord books mix dance pieces belonging to the suite form, character pieces and sonata elements, as did another Brussels musician of the same period, Joseph-Hector Fiocco.

Argentine harpsichordist Mario Raskin discovered the lost first book of Boutmy's harpsichord pieces in a friend's collection. He later recorded it for the label Follia Madrigal.
