= Stephan Hörner =

German musicologist (born 1958)

Stephan Hörner (born 1958) is a German musicologist and board member of the Gesellschaft für Bayerische Musikgeschichte.

Hörner is editor of several editions in the series Memorials of the Tonkunst in Bayern as well as of study volumes and conference reports. He has also edited various scores.

Together with Bernhold Schmid, Hörner published the Festschrift für Horst Leuchtmann zum 65. Geburtstag (at Hans Schneider), Tutzing 1993).

== Publications ==
Books

- Josef Rheinberger; Tutzing : Schneider, 2005
- Franz Lachner und seine Brüder; Tutzing : Schneider, 2006
- Abt Gallus Zeiler OSB (1705–1755) und die Musikpflege in St. Mang's Abbey, Füssen; Tutzing : Schneider, 2007
- Das Musikleben am Hof von Duke Maximilian Emanuel in Bavaria; Tutzing : Schneider, 2012

Notes

- Mozart: Concerto for Piano and Orchestra G major KV 453 [music print]. Wiesbaden: Breitkopf and Härtel; Munich: G. Henle, 2008, [voices].
- Mozart concerto for piano and orchestra G major [music print]; Wiesbaden - Breitkopf & Härtel; Munich: G. Henle, 2008, score
- Mozart piano concerto G major KV 453 [music print] - Munich : G. Henle, c 2006, Urtext
- Mozart: Concerto for Piano and Orchestra G major [music print] - Wiesbaden. Breitkopf and Härtel; Munich: G. Henle, [2013?]
- Symphonic poems by composers of the "Munich School" [music print] - Wiesbaden: Breitkopf und Härtel, 2005, [score]
- Monuments of the Art of Music in Bavaria / N.F. / Vol. 11th Selected Symphonies from the Munich Period c 1996, [score]
