= Yasunori Imamura =

Yasunori Imamura 今村 泰典
- Born: 19 October 1953 (age 72); Sakai, Osaka, Japan
- Instrument: Lute
- Website: Official website

Yasunori Imamura (今村 泰典, Imamura Yasunori; born 19 October 1953 in Sakai, Osaka) is a Japanese lutenist. Imamura has appeared on more than 150 CDs, both as a soloist and as a member of ensembles. His solo recordings include the complete lute works by Johann Sebastian Bach (two versions : for Naxos in 2018 and for Etcetera in 1991), three volumes of lute sonatas by Silvius Leopold Weiss (for Claves and Capriccio), pièces pour théorbe by Robert de Visée, Spanish music for vihuela from the time of Charles V (Querstand) and the complete lute fantasies by Simone Molinario (Deutsche Harmonia Mundi).

His teachers included lute with Eugen Müller-Dombois and Hopkinson Smith at the Schola Cantorum Basiliensis, where, in 1981, he received his soloist's diploma. In addition, he studied interpretation and basso continuo with Ton Koopman and Johann Sonnleitner and composition with Wolfgang Neininger.

Imamura has collaborated with such artists as Cecilia Bartoli, Teresa Berganza, Gérard Lesne, Marc Minkowski, Michael Schneider, Martin Gester, Maurice Steger, Masaaki Suzuki, Alan Curtis and Paul Goodwin. Mr. Imamura is a member of La Stagione Frankfurt, Les Musiciens du Louvre, Camerata Köln, Le Parlement de Musique and Il Complesso Barocco.

Imamura created the ensemble "Fons Musicae" in 1997. They have released five recordings - "Airs de cour" (Michel Lambert), and recording dedicated exclusively to works by Giovanni Bononcini, Agostino Steffani, Antonio Caldara, Francesco Gasparini and Barbara Strozzi. These recordings have received awards including "Classica" (France) and "Star of the Month" (Germany).

Imamura teaches lute at the Conservatoire National de Région, Strasbourg since 1984. In 1989, he began teaching at the Hochschule für Musik und Darstellende Kunst, Frankfurt University of Music and Performing Arts. He gives master-classes in Europe and throughout the Far East.

== Awards ==
- "Diapason d'Or" prize by French Diapason Magazine (July–August 2006)
- "Joker de Crescendo" prize by the Belgian magazine, Crescendo.(September–October 2008)
- "Cultural achievement award" by the Canton of Solothurn (Switzerland) in 2010.
- "The classica" by the French magazine, Classica (July-August 1998)
- "Star of the Month" Prize by the Fono Forum Magazine (march 2002)
