= Oscar Milani =

Argentine musician

Oscar Milani (born November 24, 1946, in Rosario, Argentina), is an Argentine musician. A Bariloche Foundation scholarship holder, he went to Buenos Aires to specialize; harpsichord, chamber music, and interpretation on early keyboard instruments. His activities as a soloist and chamber musician with the Camerata Bariloche took him to several countries of South America and also to Europe. He has made recordings for the ORF and Picks Records.

He built one of his country’s first harpsichords based on historical models (Baffo of 1574), which has met with great acclaim from the European press. Claudio Di Veroli was a great help.

A German State grant from the DAAD, enabled him to continue his studies in Europe, first with Kenneth Gilbert in Stuttgart, then in courses with Marinette Extermann, Johann Sonnleitner, Colin Tilney and Bob van Asperen.

With his friend and compatriot Gabriel Garrido, and for more than ten years, he organised the early music classes at Neuburg an der Donau.

Oscar Milani has been teaching harpsichord, chamber music and continuo at the Hochschule in Nuremberg since 1981 and at the Fachakademie für Kirchenmusik in Bayreuth since 1993. As a performer he is also interested in works of the present day and he has recorded works by Ástor Piazzolla (self transcribed works for Harpsichord with Mario Raskin), Hugo Distler and Frank Martin. He has appeared at the Gewandhaus, Leipzig, the Semperoper, Dresden, the Liederhalle, Stuttgart, the Salle Cortot, Paris, the Konzertsaal of the Meistersinger Conservatorium and Meistersingerhalle the Martha Kirche in Nuremberg and at the Teatro Colón in Buenos Aires.

His last recording was Sonatas for Harpsichord of the famous Padre Martini of Bologna.
