= Dieter Rexroth =

German musicologist and dramaturge (1941–2024)

- Rexroth c. 2000
- Born: 6 March 1941; Dresden, Saxony, German Reich
- Died: 9 April 2024 (aged 83); Berlin, Germany
- Education: Cologne University; Vienna University; Bonn University
- Occupations: Musicologist; Dramaturge
- Organizations: Alte Oper; Deutsches Symphonie-Orchester Berlin; Felix Mendelssohn Bartholdy Prize

Dieter Rexroth (6 March 1941 – 9 April 2024) was a German musicologist, dramaturge and cultural manager. He was intendant of the Deutsches Symphonie-Orchester Berlin from 1996, responsible also for choirs and orchestras in Berlin. He worked for major festivals including Frankfurter Feste at the Alte Oper, Young Euro Classic in Berlin and the Kasseler Musiktage. He wrote or edited books about composers including Paul Hindemith, Hans Werner Henze and Wolfgang Rihm.

== Biography ==
Born in Dresden on 6 March 1941, Rexroth grew up in Lohr am Main from 1945. He began studies of studied composition, conducting, and music pedagogy Cologne University in 1961. From 1963, he studied musicology, German studies and philosophy at the universities of Vienna and Bonn. In 1970, he achieved his doctorate in Bonn with a dissertation on Arnold Schönberg. He studied further for his habilitation, supported by a scholarship of the Thyssen Foundation, writing about the vocal style of Richard Wagner.

Rexroth worked as a music journalist and critic for papers such as Frankfurter Rundschau, General-Anzeiger Bonn and Neue Zürcher Zeitung, and for broadcasters such as Hessischer Rundfunk, Deutschlandfunk, Deutsche Welle and Westdeutscher Rundfunk. He was founding director of the Hindemith Institute in Frankfurt am Main in 1974 and directed it until 1991, where he published the Hindemith yearbook and Frankfurter Studien as editor. He connected the topic Hindemith to institutions such as Musikhochschule München, Salzburg Mozarteum and Berliner Festwochen. He organised concerts and conferences at the institute in Frankfurt and in several cities. Rexroth lectured at the Musikhochschule Frankfurt, Marburg University, Gießen University, Hochschule für Musik Mainz and the Mozarteum. He developed a chamber music course program for Blonay, focused on Hindemith, in collaboration with Thomas Brandis, Bruno Giuranna, Saschko Gawriloff, Aloys Kontarsky, Rainer Kussmaul, Siegfried Palm and Boris Pergamenschikow. He held Wagner seminars at the Internationales Jugendfestspieltreffen in Bayreuth in den 1970s.

From 1980 to 1994, Rexroth was dramaturge at the Alte Oper concert hall in Frankfurt and co-founder of the Frankfurter Feste serving as the festival's artistic director from 1986 to 1994. He ran composers' portraits as part of the festival including of Sylvano Bussotti, John Cage, Mauricio Kagel, Luigi Nono, Olivier Messiaen, Wolfgang Rihm and Karlheinz Stockhausen, and commissioned new compositions. In 1980 he also developed concepts for Schott of new book series about composers (Komponisten-Monographien and compositions (Werkmonographien). He authored scientific publications with topics including Henze, Messiaen, Rihm, music of the 20th century and the string quartets by Mozart and Beethoven.

From 1994 Rexroth developed an artistic event concept for St. Pölten as intendant of the Lower Austrian cultural scene.

In 1996, Rexroth became intendant of the Deutsches Symphonie-Orchester Berlin, responsible also for the RIAS Kammerchor, the Berliner Rundfunkchor and the Berlin Radio Symphony Orchestra. He brought the conductor Kent Nagano to Berlin in 2000 and served as his dramaturgical consultant. In 2000, he was among the founders of the Young Euro Classic festival for youth orchestras in Berlin and worked as its artistic director. He followed Nagano as dramaturge and assistant to both the Bavarian State Opera and the Montreal Symphony Orchestra, remaining in Munich until 2013.

Rexroth directed the Kasseler Musiktage festival from 2005 to 2015. Since 2013, he was artistic director of the Felix Mendelssohn Bartholdy Prize, where he designed a promotion of the prizewinners and being chairman of the jury for composition.

He was appointed honorary professor at the Berlin University of the Arts in 2016.

Rexroth died in Berlin on 9 April 2024, at the age of 83.

== Publications ==
=== As author ===
- Arnold Schönberg als Theoretiker der tonalen Harmonik. Dissertation. Bonn University 1969.
- Beethoven. Schott, Mainz among others 1982, ISBN 3-7957-2300-0. Taschenbuchausgabe: Goldmann, Munich 1982, ISBN 3-442-33019-X.
- Museum. 175 Jahre Frankfurter Museums-Gesellschaft e.V. Frankfurter Museums-Gesellschaft, Frankfurt 1984.
- with Andres Briner, Giselher Schubert: Paul Hindemith. Leben und Werk in Bild und Text. Schott, Mainz 1988, ISBN 3-7957-0204-6.
- Beethovens Symphonien. Ein musikalischer Werkführer. Beck, Munich 2005, ISBN 3-406-44809-7.

=== As editor ===
- Erprobungen und Erfahrungen. Zu Paul Hindemith's Schaffen in den zwanziger Jahren. Schott, Mainz 1978, ISBN 3-7957-0112-0
- Zwischen den Grenzen. Zum Aspekt des Nationalen in der neuen Musik. Schott, Mainz 1979, ISBN 3-7957-0113-9.
- Paul Hindemith: Briefe. Fischer, Frankfurt 1982, ISBN 3-596-22146-3.
- Opus Anton Webern. Quadriga, Berlin 1983, ISBN 3-88679-101-7.
- Der Komponist Wolfgang Rihm. Schott, Mainz among others 1985, ISBN 3-7957-2460-0.
- Der Komponist Hans Werner Henze. Schott, Mainz among others 1986, ISBN 3-7957-2354-X.
