= Gerhard Ammerer =

Austrian historian and professor

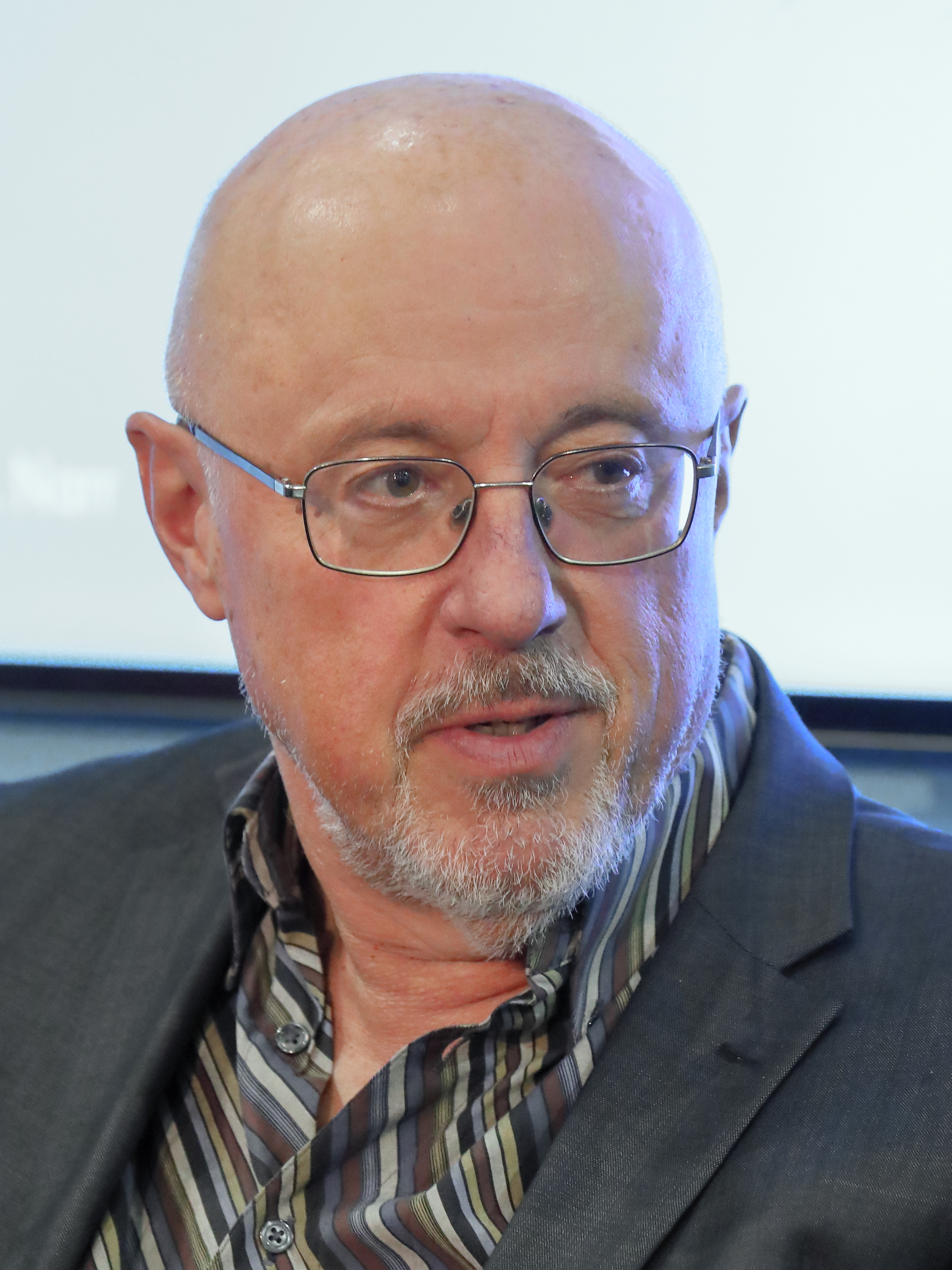
Gerhard Ammerer

Gerhard Ammerer (born 11 September 1956) is an Austrian historian and professor at the University of Salzburg.

== Career ==
Born in Salzburg, Ammerer studied history and German language and literature at the universities of Salzburg and Innsbruck from 1975 to 1981.

Between 1981 and 1985 he was a contract assistant at the Institute for History at the University of Salzburg and completed studies in history, dissertation and law. He completed both studies with a doctorate.

From 1985 he was a university assistant, from 1996 assistant professor.

In 2000 he habilitated at the Faculty of Humanities of the Paris-London-University Salzburg for the subject "Austrian History". In 2001 he was appointed ao.Univ.-Prof.

== Publications ==
- Das Ende für Schwert und Galgen?: Legislativer Prozess und öffentlicher Diskurs zur Reduzierung der Todesstrafe im ordentlichen Verfahren unter Joseph II. (1781 - 1787). Salzburg: StudienVerlag. 2010. ISBN 978-3-7065-4935-6.
- Harald Waitzbauer (2015). Das Sternbräu: Die Geschichte eines Salzburger Brau- und Gasthauses. Salzburg: Pustet. ISBN 978-3-7025-0776-3.
- Gerhard Fritz, ed. (2013). Die Gesellschaft der Nichtsesshaften: zur Lebenswelt vagierender Schichten vom 16. bis zum 19. Jahrhundert; Beiträge der Tagung vom 29. und 30. September 2011 im Kriminalmuseum Rothenburg ob der Tauber. Affalterbach: Didymos-Verlag. ISBN 978-3-939020-82-0.
- Jutta Baumgartner (2015). Die Getreidegasse: Salzburgs berühmteste Straße, ihre Häuser, Geschäfte und Menschen. Salzburg: Colorama. ISBN 978-3-902692-21-4.
- Heimat Straße: Vaganten im Österreich des Ancien Régime. Munich: Oldenbourg-Wissenschaftsverlag. 2003. ISBN 3-486-56728-4.
- Harald Waitzbauer (2011). Wege zum Bier - 600 Jahre Braukultur: Mit Spaziergängen durch die Stadt Salzburg und Ausflügen in die Umgebung. Salzburg: Stadtarchiv und Statistik. ISBN 978-3-900213-16-9.
- Harald Waitzbauer (2014). Wirtshäuser: eine Kulturgeschichte der Salzburger Gaststätten. Salzburg: Pustet. ISBN 978-3-7025-0750-3.
- "Giuseppe Tomaselli 1758–1836. Eine biographische Skizze des Salzburger Hoftenors uns Gesangspädagogen aus Anlass seines 250. Geburtstags". In: Mitteilungen der Gesellschaft für Salzburger Landeskunde, vol. 148 (2008), p. 89-104, ISSN 0435-8279
