= Anna Barbara Speckner =

German harpsichordist

- Born: Anna Barbara Speckner; 20 October 1902; Munich, Germany
- Died: 10 February 1995 (aged 92) Munich, Germany
- Genre: Classical
- Occupation: Musician
- Instrument: Harpsichord
- Label: Harmonia Mundi

Anna Barbara Speckner (20 October 1902 – 10 February 1995) was a German harpsichordist, pianist, and music editor. She was married to Greek musicologist, pianist, and philosopher Thrasybulos Georgiades.

== Life ==
Speckner was born in Munich, Germany on 20 October 1902. She studied piano with composer August Schmid-Lindner (1870–1959) at the University of Music and Performing Arts Munich from 1927 to 1936. She then went on to study with Dorothee Günther-Schule in Munich. From 1962 to 1968, Speckner taught harpsichord during the summer months at the Mozarteum University Salzburg. In 1966, she began teaching at the Orff Institute Salzburg (an institution of the Mozarteum).

In 1936, Speckner married Thrasybulos Georgiades (1907–1977), director of the Athens Conservatoire. She taught and performed in Munich, Athens, Heidelberg, and Salzburg. In 1963, a documentary film directed by Aito Mäkinen was produced in the Ateneum Museum of Speckner performing the music of Johann Sebastian Bach. Among Speckner's students is Romanian-German composer and organist Michael Radulescu. Speckner died on 10 February 1995 in Munich at the age of 92.

== Publications ==
Speckner served as executive music editor for various publications, editing historical works for keyboard, including:

- Old English Contredances, edited for keyboard by Anna Barbara Speckner, Verlag B. Schott's Söhne Mainz 1967, 31 pages.
- From Old Play Books: 32 Dances and Pieces from the 16th and 17th Century, for Keyboard Instruments edited by Anna Barbara Speckner, Schott Verlag Mainz 1972, 52 pages.
