= Heiner Ruland =

German composer (1934–2017)

Heiner Ruland (6 April 1934 – 25 March 2017) was a German composer and music therapist.

== Life ==
Born on 6 April 1934, in Aachen, Ruland studied chemistry after a humanistic secondary school education, then school music with harpsichord as main subject with Fritz Neumeyer in Freiburg im Breisgau. From 1963 to 1974, he worked as a music teacher at the Waldorf School Benefeld, Lüneburg Heath.

Based on Kathleen Schlesinger's research and Rudolf Steiner's suggestions, intensive musical-anthroposophical research work developed alongside teaching, as laid down in Ein Weg zur Erweiterung des Tonerlebens : musikalische Tonkunde am Monochord In the course of this musical-humanistic research, an extensive teaching and lecturing activity began. His work as a composer in an expanded tonal system became increasingly important. From 1976 to 2001, he continued to work full-time in the practice of Music therapy at the Öschelbronn Clinic, a hospital for internal diseases.

Ruland died in Hamborn, on 25 March 2017, aged 82.

== Work ==
=== Vocal music ===
==== Sologesang ====
- Lieder, Duette, Terzette
- Liederzyklen auf Gedichte von Hölderlin, Morgenstern, Heimlander, Goethe, Droste-Hülshoff

Choir

- Die Tageszeiten
- Steffen-Chöre
- Der Seelenkalender
- Novalis-Chöre
- Prolog des Johannes
- Sophokles-Chöre

Cantatas

- Advent-Kantate
- Die sieben Worte des Gekreuzigten
- Die sieben Erscheinungen des Auferstandenen
- Himmelfahrts-Kantate "Denn die Erde ist sein"
- Michaeli-Kantate
- Die Kristallkugel (Brüder Grimm)

=== Choir and Orchestra ===
- Grenzen der Menschheit (Goethe)
- Der Tanz (Schiller)

Singspiel

- Die Insel

=== Chamber music ===
- Variationen über ein Thema von A. von Webern
- Das Viergetier für Bratsche solo
- Streichquartett
- Streichseptett
- Die Nacht der Künste für Flöte und Vierteltoncembalo

=== Clavichord, Clavicantal, Harpsichord, Organ ===
- 3 Sontinen
- Studie über die 8 Schlesinger'schen Töne
- Suite der Elemente für Cembalo
- Die Wochentage
- Der Öschelbronner Orgelkalender (12 Umspiele und Reihen)
