= Hartmut Schick =

German musicologist

Hartmut Schick (born 16 October 1960) is a German musicologist and since 2001 professor at the Institute for Musicology of LMU Munich.

== Life ==
Born in Herrenberg, Schick grew up mainly in Schwäbisch Hall, and from 1981 studied 16 semesters musicology, history and philosophy at the University of Tübingen, and from 1983 under Ludwig Finscher at Heidelberg University. In 1989, he was awarded a doctorate for a thesis entitled Studien zu Dvoráks Streichquartetten.

From 1989 to 1996, he worked as a research assistant at the University of Tübingen, where he was habilitated in 1996 with the study Musikalische Einheit im italienischen Madrigal von Rore bis Monteverdi. He then taught until 1998 at the University of Tübingen, and was contributing editor of Denkmäler der Musik in Baden-Württemberg. He also taught at the Staatliche Hochschule für Musik Trossingen and at the University of Bern.

In 1998, he became a university lecturer at the University of Tübingen, but in 1999 and 2000 he moved to LMU Munich, where he succeeded Theodor Göllner.

Since 2011, Schick has been project manager of the "Kritischen Ausgabe der Werke von Richard Strauss" and head of the Richard Strauss Complete Edition Research Unit at LMU Munich.
