= Philippine Schick =

German classical composer

Ida Philippine Eleanor Rosa Schick, married name Philippine von Waltershausen, (1893–1970) was a German composer, pianist, conductor and university lecturer. She was one of the few female composers whose works were performed in Nazi Germany.

== Biography ==
Born on 9 February 1893 in Bonn, Ida Philippine Eleanor Rosa Schick was the daughter of the German linguist and university professor Josef Schick (1859–1944) and his English wife Mary Butcher. In 1897, the family moved to Munich. In her teens, Schick wrote short stories and a play and composed Lieder and piano pieces. After matriculating from high school, she took private lessons in Greek, Latin and English. From 1910, she studied Chinese hieroglyphics.

Despite her father's discouragement, she entered the Munich Conservatory in 1914, studying piano under Friedrich Klose and composition under Hermann Zilcher. She graduated in composition in 1918. In 1927, she married Hermann Wolfgang von Waltershausen with whom she had a daughter Lore. They divorced in 1932 as Schick complained he left her insufficient time for cultural work.

From 1918 to 1936, she composed over 30 works, including lieder, chamber and choral music, and a piano concerto.

Philippine Schick died on 13 January 1970 in Munich.
