= Lucius R. Wyatt =

American trumpet player and composer (born 1938)

- Born: Lucius Reynolds Wyatt; August 18, 1938 (age 87); Waycross, Georgia

Lucius Reynolds Wyatt (born August 18, 1938) is an American trumpet player, composer and professor.

Wyatt was born in Waycross, Georgia. From an early age he studied piano with his mother as well as trumpet. At Central High School he worked with the bandleader E. C. Christian. Attending Florida A&M University, he studied with William P. Foster, Johnnie V. Lee, Phillip Cooper, and Lenard C. Bowie, graduating with a Bachelor of Science degree in 1959. He then attended the Eastman School of Music where he studied with Robert V. Sutton, Frederick Fennell, Sidney Mear, and Donald Hunsberger, obtaining his master's degree in 1960. The title of his dissertation was The Mid-Twentieth-Century Orchestral Variation, 1953-1963; he received his Ph.D. in 1974. He also studied trumpet privately with Sigmund Hering.

Wyatt was on the faculty of Tuskegee University from 1960 to 1963 and 1965 to 1974. During 1963-1965 Wyatt toured with the U.S. Army Headquarters Band. Since 1974 Wyatt has been on the faculty of Prairie View A&M University.

== Selected compositions ==
- Rondo for brass quartet (1969)
- Diversions for solo percussionist and wind ensemble (1974)
- Centennial Salute for symphonic band (1978)

== Selected writings ==
- "The present state and future needs of research in black concert and recital music," Black Music Research Journal 1 (1980), p. 80-94.
- "The inclusion of concert music of African-American composers in music history courses," Black Music Research Journal 16, no. 2 (fall 1996), p. 239-257.
- "Six composers of nineteenth-century New Orleans," Black Music Research Journal 9, no. 1 (1989), pages 4–9; 10, no. 1 (1990), p. 125-140.
- "Conversation with Alvin Singleton, composer," Black Music Research Journal 11, no. 2 (1983), p. 178-189.
- "Lena Johnson McLin, composer," Black Music Research Journal 9, no. 2 (1989), p. 9-11.
- "Fifteen black American composers: A bibliography of their works," The Black Perspective in Music 11, no. 2.
- "Ulysses Kay's Fantasy variations: an analysis," The Black Perspective in Music 5, no. 2 (1977), p. 75-89.
