= Otto Künzli =

Swiss goldsmith and lecturer (born 1948)

- Born: 22 July 1948 (age 76); Zürich, Switzerland
- Education: Academy of Fine Arts, Munich (1987-1994); Schule für Gestaltung Zürich (1965-1970)
- Known for: Goldsmithing, contemporary jewellery, metalwork, photo-jewelry
- Notable work: "Gold makes blind"
- Spouse: Therese Hilbert

Otto Künzli (born 22 July 1948) is an active Munich-based goldsmith and university teacher at Academy of Fine Arts, Munich.

== Life and career ==
=== 1965–1978: Early life ===
Künzli attended a metals class with teachers, Max Fröhlich and Fritz Loosi at the School of Design Zurich in 1965 and completed training as a goldsmith in 1970. After attending the School of Design Zurich, Künzli worked in various workshops with Günter Wyss (Zurich), Othmar Zschaler (Bern) and Professor Hermann Jünger (Munich). In 1972 he married goldsmith Therese Hilbert and moved to Ingelsberg in Bavaria. He furthered his goldsmithing education at the Academy of Fine Arts in Munich under Hermann Jünger from 1972 to 1978. In that time he and Therese had their first child, Miriam Künzli (born 1976). Today, Miriam is a professional photographer.

== Career ==
Künzli organized his first solo exhibition in 1979 at the Schmuckmuseum Pforzheim. Since then he has shown about 50 solo exhibitions worldwide. In 1986, he received a teaching assignment at the New Paltz University College, State University of New York and another assignment in 1988 the Royal College of Art in London. In addition, Künzli lectured worldwide at established teaching institutions, directing lecture series in the United States and Canada during the years of 1986/87/90. In 1990 he held more lectures and workshop projects in Australia, New Zealand and Singapore at the invitation of the Goethe-Institut. In 1991 Künzli took over the professorship of Hermann Jünger, teaching goldsmithing and jewelry design at the Academy of Fine Arts Munich which he directed until 2014. Since 1993, he has held regular lectures and workshops at Hiko Mizuno College in Tokyo. In 2015, solo show "Otto Künzli: The Exhibition" at the Tokyo Metropolitan Teien Art Museum. From 2008 to 2012 he was a visiting professor at the Royal College of Art, London.

== Legacy ==
Künzli's works have been recorded internationally in more than 50 museums, public collections and important private collections. Künzli's artistic impact is evident in his national and international appeal as a professor of jewelry design. There are many successful artists such as Karl Fritsch, Karen Pontoppidan, Norman Weber, Lisa Walker, David Bielander, Bettina Speckner and Jiro Kamata who have completed studies under Künzli.

Some of Künzli's pieces of jewelry are marked with his signature. This can be read vertically as the number eight (Italian "otto") and horizontally as the mathematical symbol for infinity.

== Awards and scholarships ==
- 2010: Grand Prix Design, Switzerland [4]
- 2010: Design Award of the Federal Republic of Germany in silver for the design of the exhibition "The madness fat booty - jewelry at the Academy of Fine Arts Munich: The class Künzli"
- 2011: Golden Ring of Honor, Society for Goldsmithing
