= Franz Krautwurst =

German musicologist

Franz Xaver Krautwurst (7 August 1923 – 30 November 2015) was a German musicologist and academic teacher.

== Life ==
Franz Krautwurst was born in Munich on August 7, 1923. He was educated at the University of Music and Theatre Munich from 1939 through 1942, and then was conscripted into the German military for service from 1942-1945. He pursued further studies in musicology after World War II at the Ludwig-Maximilians-Universität München under Rudolf von Ficker and Thrasybulos Georgiades. He obtained a doctorate in musicology from the University of Erlangen–Nuremberg in 1950; studying there with Rudolf Steglich. He joined the faculty of this latter school in 1950 and was awarded his habilitation there in 1956.

Krautwurst was a professor at the University of Erlangen–Nuremberg for twenty-four years. He left there to join the faculty at the University of Augsburg where he taught from 1980 through 1988. He founded the journal Augsburger Jahrbuch für Musikgeschichte in 1984 and in 1991 became editor of the Neues musikwissenschaftliches Jahrbuch. In addition, Krautwurst was instrumental in the International Valentin Rathgeber Society researching the biography of the composer Valentin Rathgeber. He was also a contributor to Schubert publications of the Internationales Franz-Schubert-Institut in Vienna, and contributed numerous articles to the Fränkische Lebensbilder. Most of his later writings were on the music history of the cities of Augsburg and Nuremberg.

Krautwurst died on 30 November 2015 in Erlangen at the age of 92.

== Work (selection) ==
- Franz Krautwurst: Rathgeber, Johann Valentin. In Die Musik in Geschichte und Gegenwart. Vol 7. Kassel 1989. pp. 19–22.

== Awards ==
- 1961: Preis der Stadt Nürnberg
- 2007: Wolfram-von-Eschenbach-Preis of the Mittelfranken district
- 2008: Order of Merit of the Federal Republic of Germany
- Honorary membership of the Internationale Valentin-Rathgeber-Gesellschaft
