= Bettina Speckner =

German jewelry designer

- Born: 1962 (age 63–64); Offenburg, Germany
- Education: Academy of Fine Arts, Munich (1984-1992); MFA diploma (1993)
- Known for: photo decal enameling, contemporary jewellery, photo-jewelry, Brooches, Jewelry, Photograph as Material, Use of Vintage Imagery, Germany, Erased and Obscured, Recycled, Contemporary Traces of Memory, Time, Metal, Found Objects, Design, Assemblage
- Website: http://www.bettina-speckner.com

Bettina Speckner (born spring of 1962 in Offenburg, Germany) is a jewelry designer, widely known for her use of photography in brooch assemblages, using nineteenth century ferrotype (tintype) portraits as one may use raw materials for jewelry.

Today, she creates her own tintypes with a handmade camera obscura and a portable makeshift darkroom. Tintypes are one-shot images created from a layer of emulsion applied to a thin sheet of metal; each image is taken and developed in the same location. Her photo on metal is not limited to the tintype method, she uses many techniques including photo etching on zinc and photo-enameling. Bettina does not do the enameling process herself but works with a small company in Portugal that still practices this process.

== Education ==
In 1984 Bettina began studying painting at the Academy of Fine Arts in Munich before switching to study jewelry (1986) under Hermann Jünger and in 1991, Otto Künzli. In 1985 she was a guest student with the Fluxus artist Daniel Spoerri (with whom she had an exhibition at Schmuckmuseum, Pforzheim in 2014). She received her teaching diploma as well as Masters of Fine Arts degree from the Academy in 1992 and 1993. Bettina has facilitated many lectures and teaching assignments since receiving her diploma.

== Career ==
Since 1992 Bettina runs her own jewelry workshop, first in Munich and now in lake Chiemsee. Although Bettina transferred from the painting department to the jewelry department, her work is rarely three-dimensional, and most often transpires on a two-dimensional surface. Otto Künzli's Automatenfotos series(1976) that took place in a Munich photo booth was a crucial reason she began making jewelry.

Bettina has been published in a substantial amount of periodicals, exhibitions catalogs, and books since 1986. She had her first solo exhibition in 1988 at the Galeria Thomas Cohn in São Paulo, Brazil and has shown internationally in numerous solo and group exhibitions from that time. Her work is in a number of private and public collections.

Bettina has received many awards and accolades for her work including the Herbert Hoffmann Prize (1998), commendations for the Danner Prize (1990, 2005) and The Prize of the State of Bavaria (2011).

== Public collections ==
Danner Foundation, Munich, GER

Jewellery Museum, Pforzheim, GER

Royal college of Kind of Collection, London, GB

Musée de l'Horlogerie et de l'Emaillerie, Geneva, CH

Stedelijk Museum, Amsterdam, NL

Victoria and Albert Museum, London, GB

Mint Museum of Art and Design, North Carolina, USA

The National Gallery, Canberra, AUST

Design museum, Helsinki, FI

Röhsska museum of Decorative Arts, Gothenburg

Museum of Art and Design, NYC, USA

Nordenfjeldske Kunstindustrimuseum, Trondheim, N

Dallas Museum of Art, Dallas TX, USA

The Metropolitan Museum of Art, New York, the USA

== Exhibitions ==
2017 Kitchen Gods (two person exhibition with Priya Kambli)

2014 Bettina Speckner + Daniel Spoerri @ Schmuckmuseum Pforzheim, GER

2014 Multiple Exposures, Museum of Art & Design, New York, USA

1998 Brooching it diplomatically: a tribute to Madeleine K. Albright, Gallery Helen Drutt, USA

== Solo exhibitions ==
2015 Things of This World Keeping Their Difficult Balance

2010 A Rose is a Rose is a Rose, Gallery Sienna, Lenox, USA

2006 The Everyday and Faraway, Gallery Spectrum, Munich, GER
