= Gernot Gruber =

Austrian musicologist

Gernot Gruber (born 17 November 1939) is an Austrian musicologist.

== Life ==
Born in Bruck an der Mur, Styria, Gruber studied music, musicology, philosophy and German literature at the University of Graz and received his doctorate in 1964. Afterwards he was assistant at the same university until 1970. From 1970 to 1972 he was a fellow of the Alexander von Humboldt Foundation. From 1972 to 1975 Gruber was an assistant at the University of Vienna and was habilitated for musicology in 1973. From 1976 to 1995 he was professor at the University of Music and Performing Arts Munich and from 1995 to 2008 he held a full professorship at the University of Vienna.

Gruber is co-editor of the three-volume "Musikgeschichte Österreichs" and a permanent member of the Austrian Academy of Sciences as well as chairman of the Kommission für Musikforschung.

== Publications ==
- Mozarts Opern. Das Handbuch. Together with Dieter Borchmeyer, 2 volumes. Laaber-Verlag, Laaber 2007, ISBN 978-3-89007-463-4.
- Schubert. Schubert? Leben und Musik., Kassel 2010, ISBN 978-3-7618-2123-7.
