= Hans Rudolf Vaget =

Hans Rudolf Vaget (born February 2, 1938, in Marienbad, Czechoslovakia) is Helen and Laura Shedd Professor Emeritus of German Studies and Professor Emeritus of Comparative Literature at Smith College.

== Life ==
Hans Rudolf Vaget is Professor emeritus of German Studies at Smith College, where he taught from 1967 to 2004. A graduate of the Eberhard-Ludwigs Gymnasium, Stuttgart, he received his academic training at LMU Munich and the University of Tübingen, Cardiff University in Wales, and at Columbia University, New York. He has published widely in the field of German Studies from the 18th century to the present.

In addition to Smith College, Vaget has taught at the University of California, Irvine; at Yale University, at Columbia University, at Princeton University, the University of Massachusetts Amherst, Middlebury College, and the University of Hamburg.

The emphasis of Vaget's scholarship has been on Goethe, Wagner, and Thomas Mann. A co-founder and former president; of the Goethe Society of North America, Vaget is one of the chief editors of the new edition of the works, the letters and diaries of Thomas Mann; a former co-editor of wagnerspectrum, a journal of Wagner Studies, and since 1985 a member of the Advisory Board of the Wagner Society of New York.

== Selected publications ==
- Thomas Mann, der Amerikaner. Leben und Werk im amerikanischen Exil, 1938–1952 (Frankfurt/M: S. Fischer, 2011; 2nd. ed. 2013)
- Thomas Mann, Briefe III, 1924–1932, co-editor (Frankfurt/M: S. Fischer, 2011)
- Im Schatten Wagners. Thomas Mann über Richard Wagner, Texte und Zeugnisse 1895–1955 (Frankfurt/Main: S. Fischer, 3rd. ed. 2010
- Thomas Mann's "The Magic Mountain." A Casebook in Criticism (New York: Oxford UP, 2008)
- The Political Ramifications of Hitler's Cult of Wagner. Hamburg: Hamburg University Press, 2003, ISBN 978-3-9808223-6-7

== Honors ==
Thomas-Mann-Medal, awarded by the German Thomas Mann Society (Lübeck 1994).

Research Prize of the Alexander von Humboldt Foundation (Bonn, 2001).

Mellon Emeritus Fellowship (New York, 2011).

Fellowship (Berlin Prize) from American Academy Berlin (Berlin 2012).
