= Arnold Schönberg Complete Edition =

The Arnold Schönberg Complete Edition (German: Arnold Schönberg Gesamtausgabe) is a historical-critical edition of the complete compositional works of Arnold Schoenberg, which is intended to serve both scholarship and musical practice. The edition is published by Schott Music in Mainz and the Universal Edition in Vienna.

== History ==
The edition was created in December 1965 by Schoenberg's pupil and later assistant Josef Rufer at the headquarters of the Mainz music publisher Schott Music. Initially the Volkswagen Foundation was able to secure funding, until the 1980 edition was included in the state-funded Akademienprogramm. Since then it has been supervised by the Academy of Sciences and Literature in Mainz. The first volume appeared in print in 1966. The office is located in Berlin and cooperates with the Arnold Schönberg Center in Vienna.

== Content ==
The Arnold Schoenberg Complete Edition is divided into these sections:

1. Songs and Canons, Volumes 1–3
2. Piano and Organ Music, Volume 4–5
3. Stageworks, Volumes 6–8
4. Orchestral works, volume 9–15
5. Choral works, Volume 16–19
6. Chamber Music, Volume 20–24
7. Arrangements, Volume 25–28
8. Supplements, Volumes 29–33

== See also ==
- List of compositions by Arnold Schoenberg
