= Constantin Floros =

Greek-German musicologist (1930–2026)

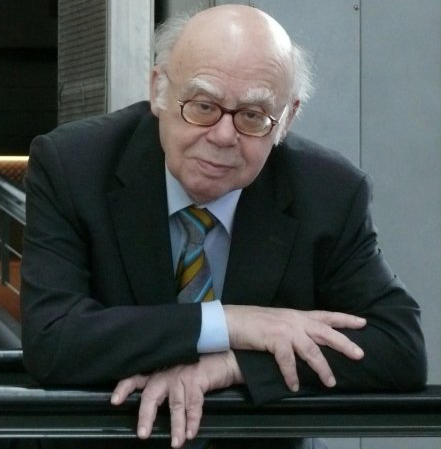
Constantin Floros in 2014

Constantin Floros (Greek: Κωνσταντίνος Φλώρος; 4 January 1930 – 4 September 2026) was a Greek–German musicologist. Among the leading German musicologists, his output includes "pioneering research" on the Second Viennese School, especially Alban Berg as well as György Ligeti.

== Life and career ==
Constantin Floros was born in Thessaloniki, Greece on 4 January 1930. He studied law at the University of Thessaloniki (1947–1951) and then composition and conducting at the Vienna Music Academy. At the same time he studied musicology with Erich Schenk at the Vienna University as well as art history (with C. Swoboda), philosophy and psychology. In 1955 he obtained the doctorate in Vienna with a dissertation on Campioni. He continued his musicological studies with Husmann at Hamburg University (1957–1960), where in 1961 he completed his Habilitation in musicology with a work on the Byzantine kontakion. In 1967 he became supernumerary professor, in 1972 professor of musicology and in 1995 professor emeritus at the University of Hamburg. He received the honorary doctorate from the University of Athens in 1999.

He was the co-editor of the Hamburger Jahrbuch fur Musikwissenschaft and in 1988 he founded and became president of the Gustav Mahler Vereinigung, Hamburg. In 1992 he was elected a member of the Erfurt Akademie der gemeinnützigen Wissenschaften and in 1999 was made an honorary member of the Richard Wagner-Verband, Hamburg.

Floros' interests included the origin of Gregorian neumes, various aspects of Byzantine music, connections between the music cultures of East and West, the semantic meaning of the 18th and 19th century symphony, and the music of the Second Viennese School.

Floros died on 4 September 2026, at the age of 96.

== Selected publications ==
- New Ears for New Music (English translation, 2014) Peter Lang; ISBN 978-3-631-63379-3
- Gyoergy Ligeti: Beyond Avant-Garde and Postmodernism, Peter Lang; ISBN 978-3-631-65499-6
- Alban Berg: Music as Autobiography, Peter Lang; ISBN 978-3-631-64597-0
