= Theodor Göllner =

German musicologist (1929–2022)

Theodor Wilhelm Alfred Göllner (25 November 1929 – 31 December 2022) was a German musicologist.

== Biography ==
Theodor Wilhelm Alfred Göllner was born in Bielefeld on 25 November 1929. He studied musicology, philosophy and medieval Latin at Heidelberg University, where he worked with Thrasybulos Georgiades and received the PhD in 1957. He began teaching at LMU Munich in 1958, where he completed the Habilitation in 1967 with a study of polyphonic lesson settings. In the same year he was a visiting professor at the University of California, Santa Barbara; he joined the faculty there in 1968 and was named professor of music in 1971. In 1973, he succeeded Georgiades as chair ("Lehrstuhl") of musicology at LMU Munich. He became editor of the series Münchner Veröffentlichungen zur Musikgeschichte in 1977 and of the Münchner Editionen zur Musikgeschichte in 1979. He was appointed chairman of the music commission of the Bayerische Akademie der Wissenschaften in 1982 and member of the European Academy of Sciences and Arts in 1991.

Göllner's interest centred on medieval music; he studied early vocal and instrumental polyphony (including the origins of keyboard music), notation and oral musical traditions. His writings on scripture settings included investigations on psalmody, masses and the relation of both monophonic and polyphonic Gospel settings to liturgical drama from the medieval era up to Viennese classicism.

The chair, or Lehrstuhl, of musicology at the university's Institut fuer Musikwissenschaft has been held by Adolf Sandberger, Rudolf von Ficker, Thrasybulos Georgiades and (from 1973) Professor Göllner. von Ficker, Georgiades and Göllner were also chairmen of the Musikhistorische Kommission of the Bayerische Akademie der Wissenschaften, which, among other projects, is responsible for the complete Orlando di Lasso edition. The Gesellschaft für Bayerische Musikgeschichte, founded in 1958, is devoted to research and publication of musicological manuscripts

Göllner was married to Marie Louise Göllner (nee Martinez), a retired professor of music history and former chair of the music department at the University of California, Los Angeles, where she worked from 1973 to 2000. They had two children, Katharina Gollner-Sweet of Falls Church, VA, and Philipp M. Gollner of Berkeley, California, and four grandchildren: Alexander and Dasha (Katharina) and Emma and Daniel (Philipp). The couple lived in Montecito, California. Before retiring to Montecito, they shared homes in Seefeld-Hechendorf, Germany, and Santa Monica, California.

Göllner died in Montecito on 31 December 2022, at the age of 93.
