= Siegfried Mauser =

- Also known as: Sigi
- Born: 1954 (age 71–72); Straubing, Germany
- Genre: Modernist
- Occupations: Pianist, academic, music manager
- Instrument: Piano
- Label: Celestial Harmonies

Siegfried Mauser (born 3 November 1954) is a German pianist, academic and music manager. In 2016, 2017, and 2018, German courts convicted him as a multiple sex offender.

== Education ==
Siegfried Mauser was born in Straubing (Bavaria). He studied piano with Rosl Schmid and Alfons Kontarsky. Through the influence of the Kontarskys in particular, Mauser became a champion of modernist and of contemporary piano music. In Munich and Salzburg, his academic subjects were musicology, philosophy and art history.

== Career ==
From 1981 to 1983 Mauser was lecturer in musicology and piano in Munich, subsequently professor of piano at the Hochschule für Musik Würzburg and of musicology in Salzburg (Austria). At Salzburg, he founded an Institute for Musical Hermeneutics. From 2003 to 2014, Mauser was President of the Hochschule für Musik München. He has been Director of the Music Section of the Bavarian Academy of Arts since 2002. Mauser is on the faculty of the State Academy for Design Karlsruhe (Germany). Philosopher Peter Sloterdijk in 2011 made a case that "Siegfried Mauser, not [Alexander] Pereira, should have become new director of the [Salzburg] Festival". In October 2015, the City of Salzburg appointed Mauser director of its festival Biennale. From October 2014 to June 2016, he served as Rector of the University Mozarteum Salzburg; Mauser had to withdraw from his position after charges against him had been substantiated in court. A generous severance pay, however, was granted to him by the Mozarteum.

== Criminal trials ==
On 13 May 2016, the Munich District Court ("Amtsgericht München") sentenced Siegfried Mauser to one year and three months' jail on probation and a 25,000 Euro penalty for sexual harassment ("sexuelle Nötigung", § 177 German Criminal Law Code) of one of his colleagues, harpsichordist Christine Schornsheim, at the Hochschule für Musik München. Following the verdict, Mauser suffered a nervous breakdown and received psychiatric treatment at the Christian Doppler Clinic within the Salzburg University Hospital. Subsequently, he appealed to the Munich Regional Court I ("Landgericht München I"). Here Mauser pleaded that judicial authorities had singled him out for a libertine way of life rather than criminal offence and urged "not to make" him "a victim of zeitgeist" ("kein Zeitgeist-Opfer"). The Regional Court, though, essentially confirmed the District Court's verdict on 26 April 2017; the prison sentence was reduced to nine months on probation. Already on 19 April 2017 further charges against Mauser had become public, one of (anal) rape and three of sexual harassment. Regarding these, Mauser was sentenced, on 16 May 2018, to two years and nine months in prison.

=== Public controversy ===
Mauser's case stirred public controversy in Germany. Taking issue with the District Court's verdict, poet and writer Hans Magnus Enzensberger claimed that a professor had taken revenge after Mauser had blocked (or at least not promoted) her career: "Ladies whose advances are rejected are like treacherous anti-tank mines. Their thirst for revenge should never be underestimated." In response, author Patrick Bahners argued that the jury had taken into account testimony by 16 witnesses; mere personal acquaintance, Bahners maintained, hardly placed Enzensberger and other friends of Mauser in a superior position to judge the events. Peter Sloterdijk, in a spoken statement at the high-profile philosophy festival phil.cologne on 21 May 2016, described the District Court's decision as a stark symptom of contemporary neo-Puritan ("neopuritanische") prudery, a social and political trend eroding the achievements of sexual liberation in Germany since the 1960s. Reacting to Mauser's case, the Hochschule für Musik München committed itself to stricter measures (both precautionary and in terms of sanctions) against sexual harassment.

== Selected honours ==
- 2009: Austrian Cross of Honours for Science and Art
- 2010: Cross of Merit of the Federal Republic of Germany
- 2012: King Maximilian Medal of the Federal State of Bavaria
