= Five Centuries Ensemble =

The Five Centuries Ensemble (1971–1984) was an early music ensemble in Paris and Italy during the 1970 and early 1980s. It was one of the first groups preceding the revival of interest in early music and historically informed performance of baroque music in the mid-1970s and 1980s.

The group's founding members were counter-tenor and composer John Patrick Thomas, cellist Marijke Verberne, and American soprano Carol Plantamura. William Christie (harpsichordist) - following his 1971 first recording with the Parisian musicologist Geneviève Thibault de Chambure (Neuilly-sur-Seine 1902 – Strasbourg 1975). Other members included American soprano Judith Nelson and harpsichordist John Whitelaw.

After the departure of Christie and Nelson to focus on baroque music with René Jacobs' Concerto Vocale in 1976, the remaining members of the Five Centuries Ensemble turned more to contemporary music, written for them by composers, such as, Luis de Pablo, Charles Boone, Lukas Foss, Morton Feldman, COMBINED with Early Music, 17th Century and earlier, based on thematic similarities, both musical and textual.

== Discography ==
- Gagliano, Marco da: Musice a una, due e tre voci; Sacrae cantiones. Five Centuries Ensemble. Italia ITL 70060
- d’India, Sigismondo: Arie, Madrigali e Mottetti. Five Centuries Ensemble. Italia ITL 70026.
- Monteverdi, Claudio: Musiche Sacre e Profane. Five Centuries Ensemble. Italia ITL 70079.
- Luzzaschi, Luzzasco: Madrigali per cantare e sonare. Five Centuries Ensemble. Italia ITL 70050
- Frescobaldi, Girolamo: Musica vocale e strumentale. Five Centuries Ensemble. Italia ITL 70095
- Scarlatti, Alessandro: Quattro Cantate. Five Centuries Ensemble. Italia ITL 70065
- Cage, John: Ryoanji. Five Centuries Ensemble. HatART CD 6183
