= Elaine Thornburgh =

- Genres: Classical music
- Occupations: Professional musician, harpsichord teacher
- Instrument: Harpsichord
- Website: music.stanford.edu/people/elaine-thornburgh

Elaine Thornburgh is an American keyboardist; she taught harpsichord at Stanford University. As a soloist, she was semi-finalist in the Sixth International Harpsichord Competition in Bruges, Belgium in 1980, and she also received a National Endowment of the Arts Solo Recitalist Grant in 1984.

== Biography ==
Thornburgh grew up in Key West, Florida. She began to play piano at age seven and started the harpsichord at age 17. Her first lesson was with Alan Curtis at the University of California, Berkeley. She also studied harpsichord with Gustav Leonhardt, and fortepiano with Malcolm Bilson. She had an independent major in Baroque Studies at UC Berkeley, and received her Masters in Music degree from the San Francisco Conservatory of Music where she specialized in harpsichord and fortepiano.

In 1977, Thornburgh moved to Santa Fe with her husband, Robert Adler. She moved to San Francisco in 1980. She was also a semifinalist in the 1980 Harpsichord Competition held in Bruges. From 1981 to 1982 she served on the music faculty at the University of California, Santa Cruz. In 1983 Thornburgh co-founded Humanities West. As president of the group, she has presented programs on classical music. She was a soloist at the Carmel Bach Festival in 1985 and also since 1985, has been a California Arts Council Touring Artist. In 1997, she founded the Western Early Keyboard Association.

Thornburgh has recorded performances of Sonatas by Domenico Scarlatti (CDs 1990, 2000) and of Grounds and Variations by William Byrd (CD 1991). She accompanied soprano Judith Nelson on the fortepiano in Haydn’s English Love Songs (CD 1991). Her Scarlatti CD was voted Critic’s Choice in 1991 by Gramophone.

== Discography ==
- Elaine Thornburgh (harpsichord) (1990). Scarlatti – Eighteen Sonatas (CD). Koch International Classics. 3-7014-2 H1.
- Judith Nelson (soprano), Elaine Thornburgh (fortepiano) (1991). She Never Told Her Love: Franz Joseph Haydn (CD). Koch International Classics. 3-7044-2 H1.
- Elaine Thornburgh (harpsichord) (1991). William Byrd, Grounds and Variations (CD). Koch International Classics. 9-7057-2 H1.
- Elaine Thornburgh (harpsichord) (2000). Domenico Scarlatti: Sonatas (CD). Lyrichord. LEMS-8049. 2 CD set, the first CD is a re-release of Thornburgh (1990).
