= Robert Erickson =

American composer (1917–1997)

Robert Erickson (March 7, 1917 – April 24, 1997) was an American modernist composer and influential music teacher. He was one of the first American composers to explore the twelve tone technique and to compose tape music.

== Education ==
Erickson was born in Marquette, Michigan. He learned both piano and violin as a child, and studied composition with Ernst Krenek at Hamline University in Saint Paul, Minnesota, graduating in 1943. He returned to Hamline after three years in the US Army, and earned a Master of Arts in music in 1947.

== Career ==
=== Teaching ===
He taught at the College of St. Catherine in Saint Paul, Minnesota, San Francisco State College, the University of California, Berkeley, and chaired the composition department of the San Francisco Conservatory from 1957 to 1966. With composer Will Ogdon, he founded the music department at the University of California, San Diego (UCSD) in 1967: "We decided we wanted a department where composers could feel at home, the way scholars feel at home in other schools." While there he met faculty performers such as bassist Bertram Turetzky, trumpeter Edwin Harkins, flutist Bernhard Batschelet, and singer Carol Plantamura: "I could go to Bert, or Ed, with something I'd written down and ask 'Hey, can you do this?' And I'd get an immediate answer. It was a fabulous time for cross-feeding."

His notable students are Morton Subotnick, Pauline Oliveros, Terry Riley, Louise Spizizen, Ramón Sender, Loren Rush, Betty Ann Wong, Terry Jennings, Allen Strange, and Paul Dresher. Many of these composers became interested in improvisation under Erickson’s influence.

Oliveros, among others, praises his teaching:

Robert Erickson was my principal composition teacher from 1954-60 and my professional mentor. His teaching was notable for supporting me to work in my own way as he did with all his students. His attitude in teaching composition was devoid of sexism or racism. He was ethical. His delight was helping others to be creative and professional in composition what ever [sic] the style. Erickson was skillful in drawing out the best abilities of his students. He was tireless in his investigation of music and had a wealth of advice and pointers to relevant musical resources—always useful and specific. His guidance was invaluable to me and to my peers (all male). None of us sounded alike in our compositions even though we liked and admired each other's work.

=== As a composer ===
Erickson was one of the first American composers to compose twelve tone system music ("I had already studied—and abandoned—the twelve tone system before most other Americans had taken it up.") and to create tape music: "If you get right down to the bottom of what composers do, I think that what composers do now and have always done is to compose their environment in some sense. So I get a special little lift about working with environmental sounds." He also has used invented instruments such as stroking rods, used in Taffy Time, Cardinitas 68, and Roddy, tube drums, used in Cradle, Cradle II, and Tube Drum Studies, and the Percussion Loops Console designed with Ron George, used in Percussion Loops.

Many University of California San Diego faculty performers appear on his 1991 CRI release Robert Erickson: Sierra & Other Works (CD 616), playing works written for and with them:

1. Kryl (1977), Harkins, named after the travelling cornet player Bohumir Kryl. The piece from time to time creates a hocket between the singing and playing.
2. Ricercar À 3 (1967), Turetzky. For bass soloist live and on two tape tracks.
3. Postcards (1981), Carol Plantamura and lutenist Jürgen Hübscher
4. Dunbar's Delight (1985), timpanist Dan Dunbar. Virtuoso solo piece for timpani.
5. Quoq (1978), flutist John Fonville. Named after Finnegans Wake.
6. Sierra (1984), baritone Philip Larson, SONOR Ensemble conducted by Thomas Nee. Commissioned by Thomas Buckner.

He also has an album Pacific Sirens on New World Records.

He wrote Ricercar a 5 for Trombones for Stuart Dempster. The piece uses baroque imitation as well as singing, whistling, fanfares, slides, and other extended techniques.

His final work is Music for Trumpet, Strings, and Tympani (1990).

=== Other activities ===
He is the author of the book The Structure of Music: A Listener's Guide, which he claimed helped him overcome a "contrapuntal obsession", and Sound Structure in Music (1975), an important early attempt to systematically study timbre in music.

Erickson also served as music director of KPFA radio in Berkeley from 1955 to 1957 and as a director of the Pacifica Foundation, KPFA's parent body, for several years thereafter.

== Recognition and awards ==
He received several Yaddo fellowships in the fifties and sixties, a Guggenheim Fellowship in 1966, a Ford Foundation fellowship, was elected as a fellow of the Institute for Creative Arts of the University of California in 1968, and his string quartet Solstice won the 1985 Friedham Award for Chamber Music. He also received awards from the National Endowment for the Arts and the American Academy.

There are two books about Erickson's life and music: Thinking Sound Music: The Life and Work of Robert Erickson by Charles Shere and Music of Many Means: Sketches and Essays on the Music of Robert Erickson by Robert Erickson and John MacKay.

== Illness and death ==
He suffered from a wasting muscle disease, polymyositis, and was bedridden and in pain for fifteen years before his death. He died in San Diego in 1997, California, aged 80.

== Recordings ==
- American Classics - A Continuum Portrait Vol 9 - Erickson: Recent Impressions, Songs, High Flyer, Summer Music. Naxos 8.559283
- Robert Erickson: Pacific Sirens. New World Records 80603
- Robert Erickson: Kryl, Ricercar, Postcards, Dunbars Delight. CRI 616
- Robert Erickson: Auroras. New World Records 80682
- Robert Erickson: Complete String Quartets. New World Records 80753
- Robert Erickson: Duo, Fives, Quintet, Trio. New World Records 80808

== Bibliography ==
- Erickson, Robert. 1975. Sound Structure in Music. Berkeley and Los Angeles: University of California Press. ISBN 0-520-02376-5.
- Erickson, Robert. 1988. "Composing Music". Perspectives of New Music 26, no. 2 (Summer): 86–95.
- Erickson, Robert, and John MacKay. 1995. Music of Many Means: Sketches and Essays on the Music of Robert Erickson. Lanham, Maryland: Scarecrow Press. ISBN 0-8108-3014-0
- MacKay, John. 1988. "On the Music of Robert Erickson: A Survey and Some Selected Analyses". Perspectives of New Music 26, no. 2 (Summer): 56–85.
- Reynolds, Roger. 1988. "Wonderful Times". Perspectives of New Music 26, no. 2 (Summer): 44–55.
- Shere, Charles. 1995. Thinking Sound Music: The Life and Work of Robert Erickson. Berkeley: Fallen Leaf Press. ISBN 0-914913-33-6
- Shere, Robert. 2001. "Erickson, Robert". The New Grove Dictionary of Music and Musicians, ed. Stanley Sadie and John Tyrrell. London: Macmillan.
