= Domenico Scarlatti =

Italian composer (1685–1757)

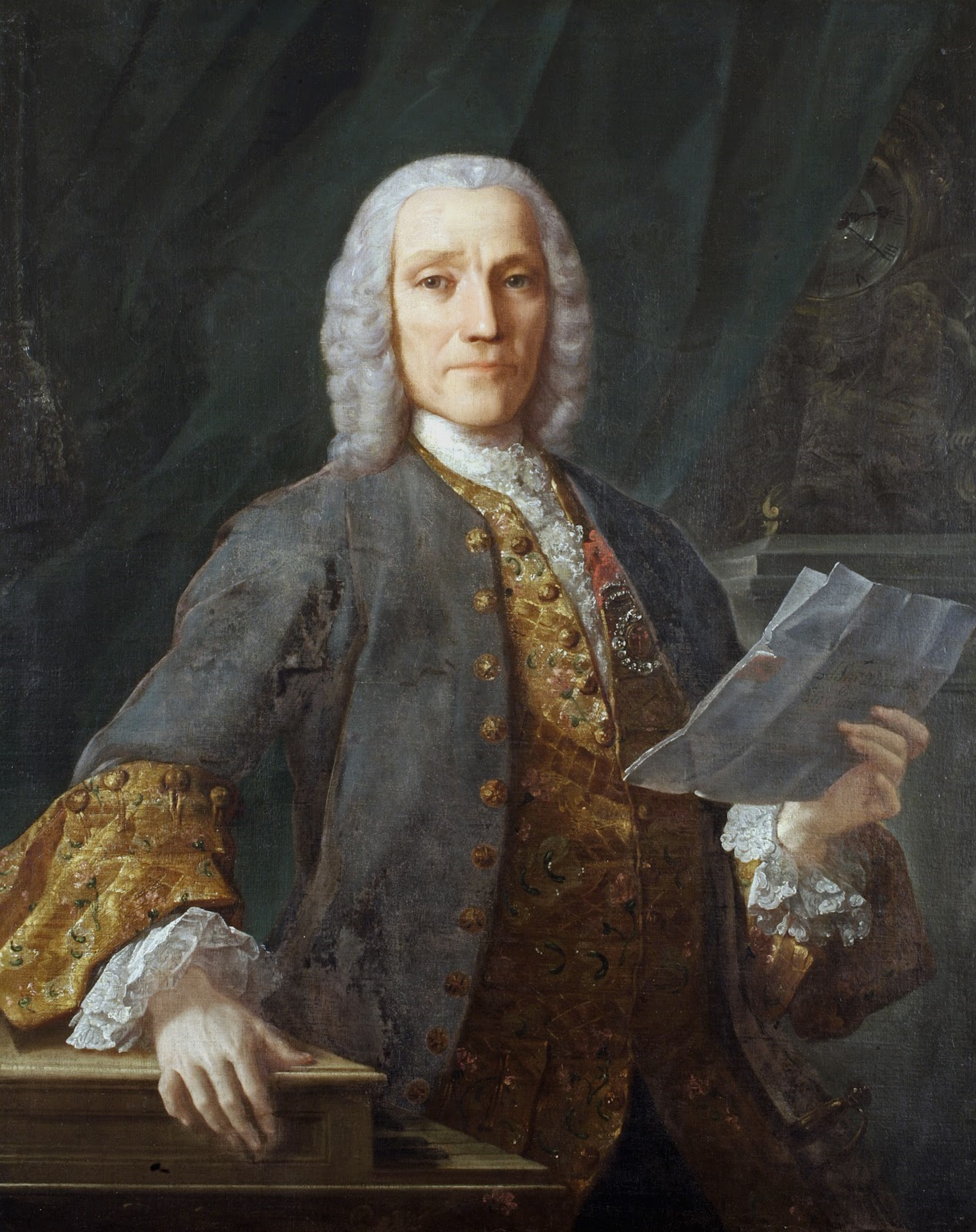
- 1738 portrait
- Born: 26 October 1685; Naples, Kingdom of Naples
- Died: 23 July 1757 (aged 71); Madrid, Spain
- Works: List of compositions

Giuseppe Domenico Scarlatti (26 October 1685 – 23 July 1757) was an Italian composer. He is classified primarily as a Baroque composer chronologically, although his music was influential in the development of the Classical style. Like his famous father Alessandro Scarlatti, he composed in a variety of musical forms, although today he is known mainly for his 555 keyboard sonatas. He spent much of his life in the service of the Portuguese and Spanish royal families.

== Life and career ==
=== Italy ===
Scarlatti was born in Naples, Kingdom of Naples, then belonging to the Spanish Empire. He was born in 1685, the same year as Johann Sebastian Bach and George Frideric Handel. He was the sixth of ten children of the composer and teacher Alessandro Scarlatti. His older brother Pietro Filippo was also a musician. It is possible, but not certain, that his mother, Antonia Anzalone of Rome, was a distant relation of the Anzalone family of musicians of Naples.

Scarlatti first studied music under his father. Although his early musical education is unclear, he may have studied under Gaetano Greco, Francesco Gasparini, and Bernardo Pasquini. Scarlatti was appointed as a composer and organist at the Chapel Royal of Naples in 1701 and briefly worked under his father, who was then the chapel's maestro di cappella. Domenico's first two operas were produced in Naples in 1703: Ottavia Restituita al Trono and Il GiustIno. In 1703 he revised Carlo Francesco Pollarolo's opera Irene for performance at Naples.

Soon after Alessandro sent Domenico to Venice by way of Florence and gave him a letter for Fernando de' Medici in the hope that there would be appointments from the Prince for Domenico and for himself. He thought that Venice would offer more opportunities for his son than Rome, even if no royal appointments were bestowed and they were not.

After this, nothing is certain of his life until 1709, when he went to Rome and entered the service of the exiled Polish queen Marie Casimire. She employed him as her maestro di cappella, where he composed the music for operas and serenatas. The operas included La Slivia (1710), L'Orlando overo la Gelosa Pazzia (1711), Tolomeo e Alessandro overo la Corona Disprezzata (1711), Tetride in Sciro (1712), Ifigenia in Aulide and Ifigenia in Tauri (1713), and Amor d'un'ombra e gelosia d'un'aura (1714), and were composed especially for Queen Casimir's private theatre. He also composed religious works like a Stabat Mater for ten voices. When the exiled queen ran out of money and left Italy, Scarlatti became a musical director at the Julian Chapel at St. Peter’s from 1714 to 1719.

While in Rome he met Thomas Roseingrave, who would later describe his harpsichord skills to Charles Burney. Scarlatti was already an accomplished harpsichordist; there is a story of a trial of skill with George Frideric Handel at the palace of Cardinal Ottoboni in Rome, where Scarlatti was judged possibly superior to Handel on the harpsichord, although inferior on the organ. Later in life, he was known to cross himself in veneration when speaking of Handel's skill.

Portugal

In September 1719, Scarlatti abandoned his post at the Vatican, and, according to Vicente Bicchi, the Papal Nuncio in Portugal at the time, he arrived in Lisbon on 29 November 1719. There is some debate about whether Scarlatti travelled to Great Britain in 1719 before going to Portugal. According to Ralph Kirkpatrick, the only written evidence is a diary entry by Francesco Colignani dated September 3, 1719 that states "Sig. Scarlatti having left for England..." and subsequent publications have based their assumptions on this source. However, there is no evidence in England that he visited Great Britain in 1719. In Lisbon he became musical director to King John V of Portugal, as well as music master to the king’s younger brother Don Antonio and Princess Maria Magdalena Barbara. He also knew of and probably met the 16-year-old Carlos Seixas, who was also at the court of John V.

=== Marriage ===
In 1724 Scarlatti returned to Italy where was able to visit his father before his death in 1725. Scarlatti left Lisbon on 28 January 1727 for Rome, where he married Maria Caterina Gentili on 6 May 1728. She was 16; he was 42. They would go on to have six children together. After his wife died in 1739, he married a Spaniard, Anastasia Maxarti Ximenes, and had four more children with her.

=== Spain ===
In 1729, Scarlatti followed Princess Maria Barbara to Seville after her marriage to Fernando, the crown prince of Spain. He continued to serve as her music master and also became music master for Prince Fernando as well. In 1733, he traveled to Madrid, continuing his role as music master to Princess Maria Barbara. In 1738 Scarlatti was awarded a knighthood by King John V of Portugal which was considered a great honor by his family and his descendants have preserved the documents of the knighthood to the present day. Shortly after his knighthood Scarlatti dedicated his first published collection of harpsichord pieces, Essercizi per Gravicembalo, to King John. In 1746 Prince Fernando and Princess Maria Barbara ascended to the throne as King and Queen of Spain and music continued to be an important part of their court activities. Most of the 555 keyboard sonatas for which Scarlatti is best known were composed for Maria Barbara and, according to Kirkpatrick, show the full range of his genius. They capture many aspects of Spanish life at the time, including the sound of castanets, drums, and the strumming of guitars. Outside of Spain Scarlatti's keyboard works had their earliest recognition in England with Thomas Roseingrave being the chief exponent of his work. He published an augmented reprint of the Essercizi in 1739 as well as a later supplement. In 1752 Dr. John Worgan issued 12 sonatas from a Spanish manuscript of the sonatas that had belonged to the organist of the Royal Chapel of Madrid. Scarlatti's fame in England continued to develop through the remainder of the 18th century. However, his music was not as well known in Italy, France or Germany at that time.

Scarlatti befriended the castrato singer Farinelli, a fellow Neapolitan also enjoying royal patronage in Madrid. Musicologist and harpsichordist Ralph Kirkpatrick, who published a biography of Scarlatti in 1953, commented that Farinelli's correspondence provides "most of the direct information about Scarlatti that has transmitted itself to our day".

Scarlatti died in Madrid at the age of 71. His residence at 35 Calle de Leganitos is designated with a historical plaque, and his descendants still live in Madrid. He was buried at a convent there, but his grave no longer exists.

Minor planet 6480 Scarlatti is named in his honour.

== Music ==
Sonata in D minor K. 9, Allegretto
Performed on a harpsichord by Martha Goldstein

Sonata in E major K. 20, Presto
Performed on a harpsichord by Martha Goldstein

Sonata in B minor K. 27, Allegro
Performed on a piano by Raymond Smullyan

Sonata in F minor K. 69
Performed on a spinet by Ulrich Metzner

Sonata in B minor K. 87
Performed on a digital harpsichord

Sonata in C major K. 159, Allegro
Performed on a piano by Veronica van der Knaap

Sonata in B minor K. 377
MIDI rendition

Sonata in E major K. 380, Andante comodo
Performed on a piano by Raymond Smullyan

Sonata in F minor K. 466
Performed on a digital harpsichord

Sonata in E major K. 531, Allegro
Performed on a piano by Raymond Smullyan

Only a small number of Scarlatti's compositions were published during his lifetime. Scarlatti himself seems to have overseen the publication in 1738 of the most famous collection, his 30 Essercizi (Exercises). They were well received throughout Europe and were championed by the foremost English writer on music of the eighteenth century, Charles Burney. Burney wrote that the harpsichordist Joseph Kelway was "head of the Scarlatti sect", a group of English musicians that championed Scarlatti as early as 1739, also including Thomas Roseingrave.

The many sonatas unpublished during Scarlatti's lifetime have appeared in print irregularly in the past two and a half centuries. He has attracted notable admirers, including Béla Bartók, Arturo Benedetti Michelangeli, Pieter-Jan Belder, Johann Sebastian Bach, Muzio Clementi, Wolfgang Amadeus Mozart, Ludwig van Beethoven, Carl Czerny, Franz Liszt, Johannes Brahms, Frédéric Chopin, Claude Debussy, Emil Gilels, Francis Poulenc, Olivier Messiaen, Enrique Granados, Marc-André Hamelin, Vladimir Horowitz, Ivo Pogorelić, Scott Ross (the first performer to record all 555 sonatas), Heinrich Schenker, András Schiff and Dmitri Shostakovich.

Scarlatti's 555 keyboard sonatas are single movements, mostly in binary form, and some in early sonata form, and mostly written for harpsichord or the earliest pianofortes. (There are four for the organ and a few for small instrumental groups). Some display harmonic audacity in their use of discords, and unconventional modulations to remote keys.

Though Scarlatti wrote over 500 sonatas, there is a wide variety in his works. Some are deeply serious, others are light and almost humorous. Some sound like courtly dances, others like street songs. This ability to cover a wide range of styles and moods is one of the hallmarks of Scarlatti's work. Another stylistic trait of this composer is the ability to mix “different forms or levels of discourse”.

Other distinctive attributes of his music are:

- The influence of Iberian (Portuguese and Spanish) folk music. An example is his use of the Phrygian mode and other tonal inflections more or less alien to European art music. Many of his figurations and dissonances are suggestive of the guitar.
- The influence of the Spanish guitar can be seen in notes being played repeatedly.
- A formal device where each half of a sonata leads to a pivotal point, which Kirkpatrick termed "the crux", and which is sometimes underlined by a pause or fermata. Before the crux, Scarlatti sonatas often contain their main thematic variety, and after the crux, the music makes more use of repetitive figurations as it modulates away from the home key (in the first half) or back to the home key (in the second half).
- Its tendency to be in the galant style.

Kirkpatrick produced an edition of the sonatas in 1953, and the numbering from this edition—the Kk. or K. number—is now nearly always used. Previously, the numbering commonly used was from the 1906 edition compiled by Neapolitan pianist Alessandro Longo (L. numbers). Kirkpatrick's numbering is chronological, while Longo's ordering is a result of his arbitrarily grouping the sonatas into "suites". In 1967 the Italian musicologist Giorgio Pestelli published a revised catalogue (using P. numbers), which corrected what he considered to be some anachronisms, and added some sonatas missing from Kirkpatrick's edition. Although the exact composition dates for these surviving sonatas are not known, Kirkpatrick concluded that they might all have been composed late in Scarlatti's career (after 1735), with most of them possibly written after the composer's 67th birthday.

Aside from his many sonatas, Scarlatti composed several operas, cantatas such as the cantata da camera Che vidi oh ciel, che vidi, and liturgical pieces. Well-known works include the Stabat Mater of 1715, and the Salve Regina of 1756, which is thought to be his last composition.

== Selected discography ==
=== Complete works ===
- L'Œuvre pour clavier, Scott Ross (1988, 34 CDs Erato/Radio France) OCLC 725539860, 935869199
- Domenico Scarlatti: The Complete Sonatas, Richard Lester, harpsichord & fortepiano (2001–2005, 39 CDs in 7 volumes Nimbus Records NI 1725/NI 1741) OCLC 1071943740.
- Keyboard Sonatas, Emilia Fadini, Ottavio Dantone, Sergio Vartolo, Marco Farolfi, Enrico Baiano..., harpsichord, fortepiano, organ (1999–2012, 12 CDs Stradivarius) – in progress
- Keyboard Sonatas, Pieter-Jan Belder, harpsichord & fortepiano (2012, 36 CDs Brilliant Classics)
- Keyboard Sonatas, Carlo Grante, Bösendorfer Imperial piano (2009–2020, 35 CDs in 6 volumes Music & Arts)

=== Piano recitals ===
- 2 Sonatas: Sonata K. 9 and Sonata K. 380 – Dinu Lipatti, piano (20 February and 27 September 1947, EMI / 12 CDs Hänssler PH17011)
- 4 Sonatas: Sonata K. 1, Sonata K. 87, Sonata K. 193, and Sonata K. 386 – Clara Haskil, piano (? 1947, BBC / Tahra TAH 389 / TAH 4025)
- 11 Sonatas: Sonata K. 1, Sonata K. 35, Sonata K. 87, Sonata K. 132, Sonata K. 193, Sonata K. 247, Sonata K. 322, Sonata K. 386, Sonata K. 437, Sonata K. 515, Sonata K. 519 – Clara Haskil, piano (October 1951, Westminster/DG 471 214-2)
- 3 Sonatas: Sonata K. 87, Sonata K. 193, and Sonata K. 386 – Clara Haskil, piano (October 1951, Philips)
- The Siena Pianoforte: 6 Scarlatti sonatas (and 3 sonatas of Mozart) – Charles Rosen, Siena piano (1955, Counterpoint/Esoteric / Everest Records CPT 53000)
- 37 Piano Sonatas: Vladimir Horowitz (1946–1981, Complete Recordings RCA and CBS/Sony Classical)
- 33 Sonatas: Christian Zacharias, piano (1979, 1981, 1984, EMI)
- 18 sonatas: Maria Tipo, piano (27–28 November 1987, EMI CDC 7 49078 2) OCLC 840330787
- 15 sonatas: Ivo Pogorelich, piano (September 1991, DG) OCLC 823888417
- Scarlatti: Keyboard Sonatas: Mikhail Pletnev, piano (October 1994, Virgin Classics 5181862) OCLC 607181242
- 16 Sonatas: Christian Zacharias, piano (1995, EMI)
- 20 Sonatas : Valerie Tryon, piano (18 and 28 September 1999, Appian Publications & Recordings [APR]) OCLC 48744435
- 14 Sonatas: Christian Zacharias, piano (June 2002, MDG 34011622)
- 18 Sonatas : Racha Arodaky, piano (17–21 July 2005, Zig-Zag Territoires) OCLC 232578921
- Scarlatti: Piano Sonatas : Yevgeny Sudbin, piano (2005, BIS)
- Alexandre Tharaud joue Scarlatti : 18 sonatas (30 August/3 September 2010, Virgin Classics) OCLC 898257762
- Scarlatti: 18 Sonatas: Yevgeny Sudbin, piano (2016, BIS) OCLC 1085343249
- Scarlatti: 52 Sonatas: Lucas Debargue, piano (2019, Sony Music)
- Scarlatti: 37 Sonatas: Alessandro Deljavan, piano (2023, OnClassical)

=== Fortepiano recitals ===
- Sonate per cembalo, 1742, Francesco Cera, harpsichord & fortepiano (7–9 March 2000, March 2001, October 2002, 3 CD Tactus) OCLC 50303672
- Sonates – Una nuova inventione per Maria Barbara, Aline Zylberajch, fortepiano after Cristofori (2005, Ambronay)

=== Harpsichord recitals ===
- Sonatas for Harpsichord, Wanda Landowska (1934, 1939, 1940, EMI)
- Keyboard Sonatas, Fernando Valenti (the 1950s, Westminster / 3 CDs Millenium MCA Universal, rereleased. 1998) OCLC 15057725, 224281078
- Keyboard Sonatas, Fernando Valenti (1951–1955, 11 CDs Pristine Audio, rereleased. 2006) OCLC 933509681
- 60 Harpsichord Sonatas, Ralph Kirkpatrick (1954, CBS SL 221 / 2 CD Urania, rerelease of 54 sonatas in 2004)
- Harpsichord Sonatas, Luciano Sgrizzi, harpsichord (1964, Accord)
- 21 Harpsichord Sonatas, Ralph Kirkpatrick (1966, 1971, Archiv Produktion, rereleased 2004)
- 10 Sonatas, Gustav Leonhardt (1970, Deutsche Harmonia Mundi)
- 16 Harpsichord Sonatas, Joseph Payne (1971, Turnabout)
- Sonates pour clavecin, Blandine Verlet (1975, Philips)
- Sonates pour clavecin, Blandine Verlet (1976, Philips)
- 11 Sonatas, Valda Aveling (1976, EMI Classics For Pleasure)
- 14 Harpsichord Sonatas, Gustav Leonhardt (1979, Seon/Sony)
- Harpsichord Sonatas – Colin Tilney, Vincenzio harpsichord 1782 (August 1979, L'Oiseau-Lyre/Decca)
- Harpsichord Sonatas, Trevor Pinnock (1981, CRD Records; rereleased in 1995) OCLC 225749151
- Sonatas, Trevor Pinnock (1987, Archiv)
- 12 Sonatas, Colin Tilney (1988, Dorian)
- Les plus belles sonatas, Scott Ross (1988, Erato/Radio France)
- Trente Sonates, Rafael Puyana (1988, 2CD Harmonia Mundi)
- Les plus belles sonatas, Rafael Puyana (1988, 1994 Harmonia Mundi) HMP 3901164
- 16 Sonatas, Ton Koopman (1988, Capriccio)
- Sonatas, Andreas Staier (December 1990, 26–28 October 1991, 2 CDs Deutsche Harmonia Mundi) OCLC 312175196, 762606993
- Sonatas, Bob van Asperen (May 1991, « Reflexe » EMI) OCLC 492478134
- 22 sonates, Pierre Hantaï (June 1992, Astrée E 8502)
- Cat's Fugue and Sonatas for Harpsichord, Elaine Comparone (27–28 August 1992, Lyrichord) OCLC 705343159
- Sonatas, Andreas Staier (December 1995, Teldec) OCLC 224634640
- Sonates inédites, Fandango, Mayako Soné (1994, Erato/Warner Classics)
- Scarlatti High and Low – 16 dernières sonates pour clavecin, Colin Tilney (1995, Music & Arts)
- 18 Sonatas, Eiji Hashimoto, harpsichord (1996, Klavier) OCLC 811245528
- 21 sonates de la maturité, Frédérick Haas (2002, Calliope)
- Sonates, Pierre Hantaï (2002, 2004, 2005, 2016, 2017, 2019 6 CDs/SACD Mirare)
- Sonatas, Elaine Thornburgh (2005, 2 CDs Lyrichord) OCLC 705343168
- Duende (17 sonatas), Skip Sempé (with Olivier Fortin, second harpsichord) (2006, Paradizo)
- 35 Sonates, Frédérick Haas (October 2016, Hitasura Productions)
- 16 Sonates – Jean Rondeau (2018, SACD Erato)
- Zones, Lillian Gordis (June 2019, Paraty PTY 919180)
- 13 Sonates Du Libro 3 De 1753, Frédérick Haas (September 2022, Histasura Productions)

=== Vocal music ===
- Scarlatti: Stabat Mater – Campra: Requiem. Monteverdi Choir; John Eliot Gardiner, conductor (2020, Erato) OCLC 1154312842
