= Chris Mary Francine Whittle =

Belgian composer, performer, teacher (born 1927)

Chris Mary-Francine Whittle
- Born: 23 May 1927; Antwerp, Belgium
- Education: Royal Conservatoire Antwerp; École Normale de Musique de Paris
- Occupations: Composer; performer; teacher
- Spouse: Luc Jageneau
- Awards: Albert de Vleeschower (for composition)

Chris Mary-Francine Whittle (born 23 May 1927) is a Belgian composer, performer (harpsichord and piano) and teacher.

== Biography ==
Chris Mary-Francine Whittle was born in Antwerp, Belgium, on 23 May 1927. Whittle studied music at the Royal Conservatoire in Antwerp, where she won several prizes, including the Albert de Vleeschower prize for composition. Whittle also studied music in France with Alfred Cortot at the École Normale de Musique de Paris.

Whittle spent 20 years on concert tours throughout Europe. She became interested in the harpsichord, which she studied in Amsterdam with Gustav Leonhardt. She taught at the Wijnegem music school in Belgium and gave recitals on harpsichord. Whittle married Luc Jageneau, a harpsichord builder.

== Works ==
Whittle's compositions were published by Schott frères. They include:

=== Chamber ===
- Capriccio, Op. 7 (violin and piano; 1947)
- Sonata (violin and piano; 1951)
- Toccata per Il Cembalo (harpsichord; 1969)
- Trio en Forme de Suite, Op. 24 (trumpet, horn, bassoon; 1955)
- Trio, Op. 11 (violin, cello and piano; 1949)
- Variations for Carillon, Op. 1 (1951)
- Woodwind Quintet (1951; won the Albert de Vleeschower prize)

=== Orchestra ===
- Concerto for Piano (1948)
- Variations on an Old Scottish Song (1952)

=== Piano ===
- 24 Preludes, Op. 14 (1952)
- Ballade, Op 15 (1949)
- Berceuse, Op. 4 (1947)
- Diurne, Op. 22 (1965)
- Impromptu, Op. 27 (1966)
- Intermezzi, Op. 32
- Ondine, Op. 12 (1952)
- Scottish Dances, Op. 16 (1951)
- Sonata, Op. 4 (1947)
- Sonata, Op. 9 (1948)
- Sonatine, Op. 30 (1967)
- Two Nocturnes, Op. 6 (1967-68)
- Two Small Pieces, Op. 25 (four hands; 1960)
- Two Suites, Op 1 (1943)

=== Vocal ===
- Christmas Carols, Op. 28 (chorus; 1966)
- Missa brevis, Op. 2 (1944)
- Odelette, Op. 20 (mezzo-soprano, piano and orchestra; 1951)
- Regina Coeli, Op. 17 (chorus; 1950)
- Six Lieder, Op. 23 (1966)
