= Simon Hantaï =

French painter

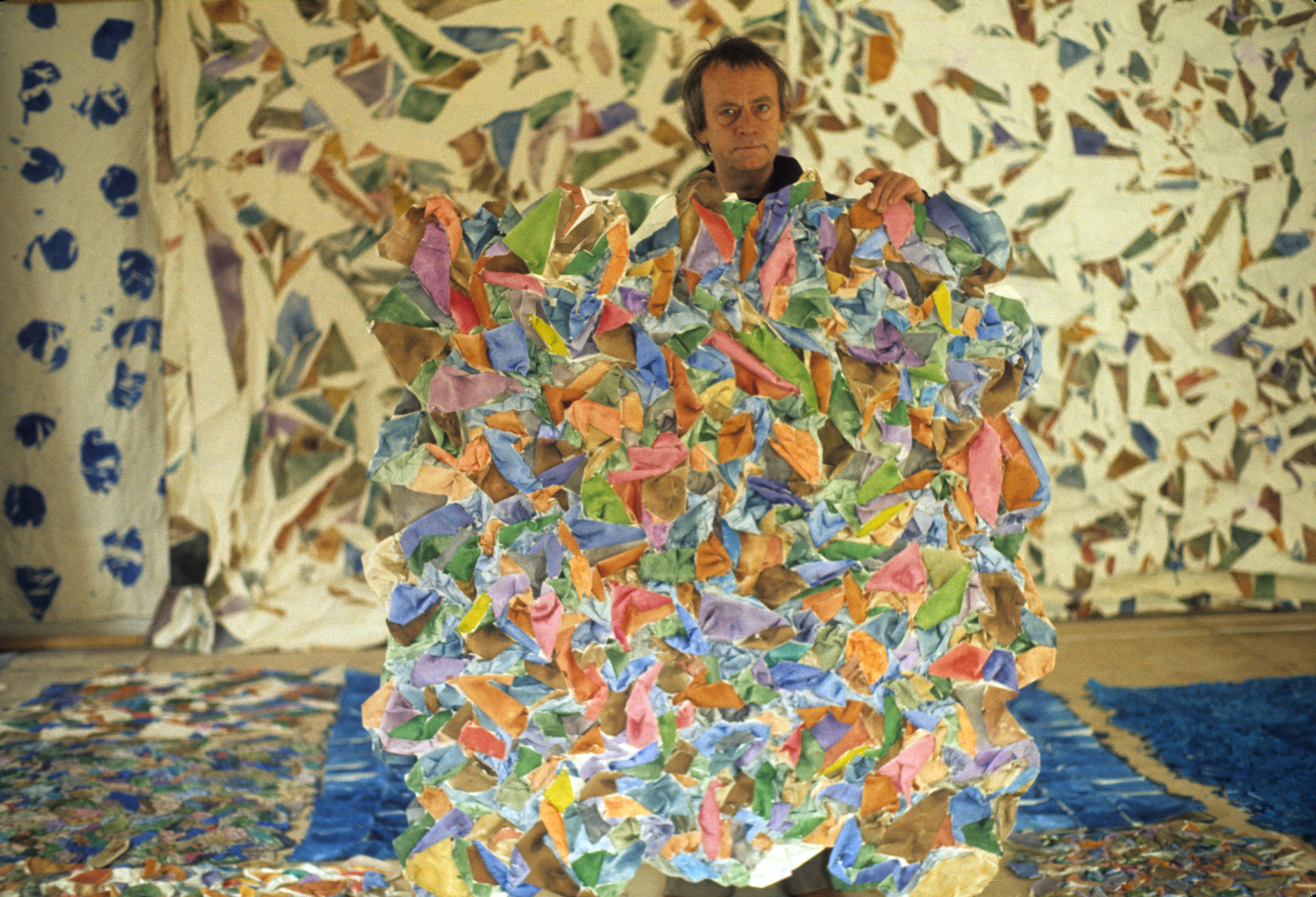
Simon Hantaï in his studio (Meun, 1974)

Simon Hantaï (7 December 1922, Biatorbágy, Hungary – Paris, 12 September 2008; took French nationality in 1966) is a painter generally associated with abstract art.

== Biography ==
After studying at the Budapest School of Fine Art, he traveled through Italy on foot and moved to France in 1948. André Breton wrote the preface to his first exhibition catalogue in Paris, but in 1955 Hantaï broke with the surrealist group over Breton's refusal to accept any similarity between the surrealist technique of automatic writing and Jackson Pollock's methods of action painting.

A retrospective of his work was held at the Centre Pompidou in 1976, and in 1982 he represented France at the Venice Biennale. He completely disappeared from the public scene during the 1980s and 1990s, "a streak of ethical obstinacy virtually unparalleled in contemporary art" according to Art in America.

A representative collection of Hantaï's works is held at the Musée National d'Art Moderne, Centre Georges Pompidou, Paris, and at the Musée d'Art Moderne de la Ville de Paris.

A Simon Hantaï Retrospective opened at the Centre Pompidou on May 22, 2013, with more than 130 works from 1949 to 1990s, and a full color illustrated catalog.

== Art practice – The folding method ==
Hantaï began creating pliage paintings in 1960, conceiving of the process as a marriage between Surrealist automatism and the allover gestures of Abstract Expressionism. The technique dominated the work he made during the rest of his career, re-emerging in diverse forms—sometimes as a network of crisp creases of unpainted canvas spanning the composition, and at other times as a monochrome mass manifesting in the center of an unprimed canvas. His technique of "pliage" (folding): the canvas is first folded in various forms, then painted with a brush, and unfolded, leaving apparent blank sections of the canvas interrupted by vibrant splashes of color. The technique was inspired by the marks left folding on his mother’ apron.

From 1967 to 1968 he worked on the Meuns series where he studies the theme of the figure. Meun is the name of a small village in the Forest of Fontainebleau where the artist lived starting 1966. Hantaï stated: "It was while working on the Studies that I realized what my true subject was – the resurgence of the ground underneath my painting." In contrast with the Meun (1967–68), the figure, in the Studies (1969), is absorbed and the white detaches from being the background and becomes dynamic.

== Selected works ==
- Mariales (Cloaks) (1960–62). Mariale M.A.4 Red sold for 650,000 euros in 2005.
- Meuns (1967–68)
- Etudes (Studies) (1969)
- Blancs (the Whites) (1973–74)
- Tabulas (from 1974)
- Laissées (Leftovers)(1981–1994)

== Exhibitions ==
- Dominique Fourcade, Isabelle Monod-Fontaine, Alfred Pacquement, Jean Coyner. Simon Hantaï, Paris: Centre Pompidou, 2013

== Private life ==
He is the father of musicians Pierre et Jérôme Hantaï.

== Selected bibliography ==
- Rosenberg, Karen, "Art in Review: Simon Hantaï," The New York Times, 5/23/13.
- Rodgers, Paul, "Simon Hantaï & Andy Warhol – The Fate of Modern Art in the Post-Second World War Era" 4/1/10.
- Rodgers, Paul, “The Resurgent Ground: Simon Hantaï,” The Modern Aesthetic, 2017.
- Rodgers, Paul, Pablo Picasso | Simon Hantaï: Drama Shared, Cubism and the Fold. 9W Publications, 2020.
- Cochran, Samuel, "Simon Hantaï's Abstract Paintings At Paul Kasmin Gallery, Centre Pompidou," Architectural Digest, 5/7/13.
- "Simon Hantaï," Time Out New York, 4/24/13.
- Ostrow, Saul, "Reviews: Simon Hantaï," Art in America, 9/11/11.
- An essay on Hantaï by art historian Molly Warnock
- Warnock, Molly. Simon Hantaï and the Reserves of Painting. Pennsylvania State University Press, 2020.
- An essay on Hantaï by Ben Lerner
