= Carol Plantamura =

American opera singer

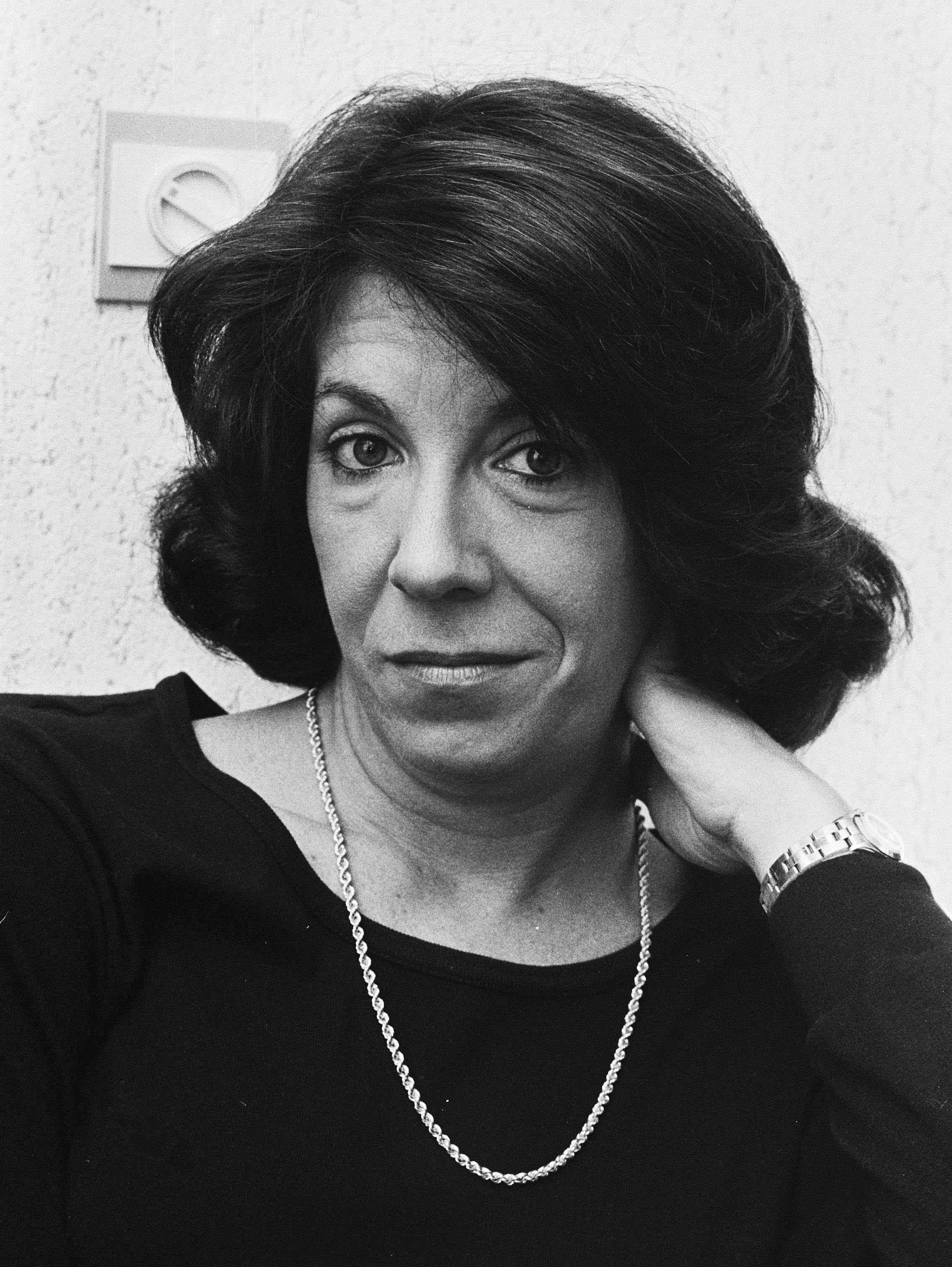
Carol Plantamura in 1979

Carol Plantamura (born February 8, 1941, in Los Angeles, California) is an American soprano specializing in 17th and 20th century music.

She graduated from Occidental College and was an original member of the Rockefeller Foundation-funded Creative Associates at SUNY Buffalo, under the direction of Lukas Foss. She has collaborated with such composers as Luciano Berio, Pierre Boulez, Vinko Globokar, Pauline Oliveros, Lukas Foss, Betsy Jolas, Will Ogdon, Bernard Rands, Frederic Rzewski, and Robert Erickson. Beginning in 1966, she was an original member of the improvising electronic music collective Musica Elettronica Viva in Rome, Italy.

From 1971 to 1984, Plantamura was active as a founding member, along with countertenor-composer John Patrick Thomas, cellist Marijke Verberne, and harpsichordist William Christie, of The Five Centuries Ensemble. The group combined early music with contemporary works (many written expressly for the ensemble) in concerts and radio broadcasts throughout Europe and America and on tours in Australia and New Zealand. Plantamura appears in six recordings of 17th-century Italian vocal music that The Five Centuries Ensemble made for the Fonit Cetra/Italia label in Italy (including works by d'India, Monteverdi, Luzzaschi, Gagliano, Frescobaldi, and A. Scarlatti-other ensemble members on the recordings include soprano Martha Herr, countertenor Thomas, lutenist Jürgen Hübscher, viola da gambist Martha McGaughey, and harpsichordist Arthur Haas).

Plantamura joined the faculty of the University of California, San Diego in 1978 and is currently Professor Emerita. She also serves on the San Diego Early Music Society (SDEMS) Advisory Panel .

== Discography ==
Includes recordings for Composers Recordings, Inc., WERGO, DGG, Fonit/Cetra, and Leonarda.

- 1968: Vinko Globokar – Accord, Pour Voix De Soprano Et 5 Solistes (1966) (WERGO, WER 329)
- 1976: Sylvano Bussotti – The Rara Requiem (Deutsche Grammophon 2530 754)
- 1978: Sigismondo d'India – Arie Madrigali E Mottetti, The Five Centuries Ensemble (Italia, ITL 70026). Never before recorded or performed in the last three centuries.
- 1978: Luzzasco Luzzaschi – Madrigali Per Cantare E Sonare, Due E Tre Soprani, The Five Centuries Ensemble (Fonit Cetra – ITL 70050), with the participation of soprano Martha Herr.
- 1979: Marco Da Gagliano – Musiche A Una, Due E Tre Voci; Sacrae Cantiones, The Five Centuries Ensemble (Italia – ITL 70060). Never before recorded or performed in the last three centuries.
- 1979: Alessandro Scarlatti – Quatro Cantate, The Five Centuries Ensemble (Italia – ITL 70065)
- 1979: Eclipse on: Roger Reynolds – Watershed IV / Eclipse / The Red Act Arias (AIX)
- 1980: Claudio Monteverdi – Madrigali sacre e profane, The Five Centuries Ensemble (Italia / [Fonit Cetra])
- 1981: Chanson de Gest on: Denis Smalley – The Pulses of Time (University of East Anglia Recordings, UEA 81063)
- 1982: American Graffiti by Leo Smit on: The Brooklyn Philharmonic Symphony Orchestra, Lukas Foss, conductor (GRAMAVISION Records)
- 1983: Girolamo Frescobaldi – Musica Vocale e Strumentale, The Five Centuries Ensemble (Italia – ITL 70095)
- 1984: The Idea Of Order At Key West on: Robert Erickson – Night Music / The Idea Of Order At Key West / Pacific Sirens (Composers Recordings, Inc. – CRI SD 494)
- 1986: Canti Lunatici on: Bernard Rands – Canti del Sol / Canti Lunatici (Composers Recordings, Inc. – CRI SD 524)

== Radio and television broadcasts ==
- 1978: Le Journee de Paul Mefano: Cinq Madrigals and La Ceremonie, Radio broadcast: France Musique.
- 1981: The Five Centuries Ensemble, Live radio broadcast: Radio France.
- 1982: La Fede Sacrilega, opera by Johann Joseph Fux, Television broadcast from: Gesellschaft für Musiktheater (Vienna).
- 1983: Frescobaldi Quadracentenial, six radio broadcasts by NPR from the Elvehjem Museum of Art, Madison, Wisconsin, between June and October.
- 1983: Mai Musicale de Bordeaux (Music from the time of Rameau), Live television broadcast from: Clôture du Chapelle Saint-Emilion, France Musique.

== Books ==
- Plantamura, Carol (1983). Woman Composers. Bellerophone Books. (a coloring/paper-doll book)
- Plantamura, Carol (1996). The Opera Lover's Guide to Europe. Citadell Press.
