= Che vidi oh ciel, che vidi =

Music composition by Domenico Scarlatti

Che vidi oh Ciel, che vidi is a cantata da camera written by Domenico Scarlatti for soprano, two violins, and basso continuo. It is one of 41 cantatas Scarlatti composed for soprano voice. The text was written by poet and librettist Pietro Metastasio. The exact date of publication is not printed on the original score. Because this cantata belongs to the volume "Österreichische Nationalbibliothek" (named for the library in Vienna, Austria), the cantata was likely composed between 1729 and 1757, during the composer's time in Spain.

Scarlatti wrote just over 50 cantatas compared to the 555 keyboard sonatas he composed. Although he composed fewer chamber cantatas, he still managed considerable success in this genre.

== Description and Form ==
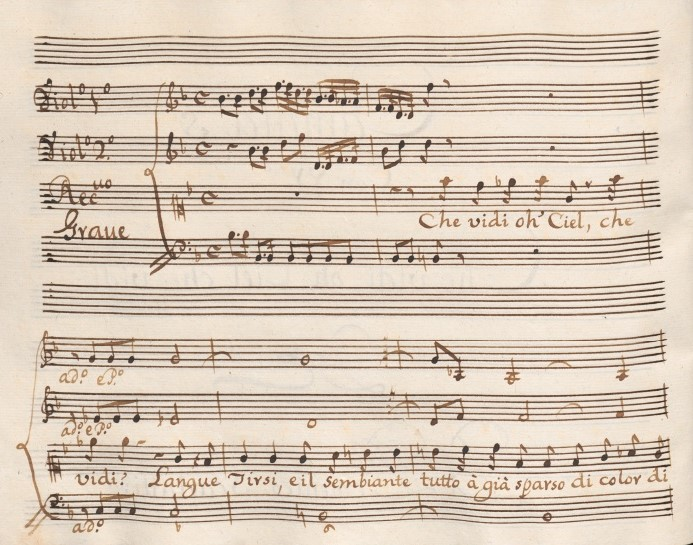
A manuscript of "Che vidi oh Ciel"

The cantata's form is adopted from Alessandro Scarlatti's da capo aria form. It follows a recitative-aria-recitative-aria format. It is written for soprano voice in soprano clef accompanied by two violins and basso continuo.

=== Recitativo ===
The recitatives have a generally homophonic texture. The accompanying voices move in rhythmic and harmonic unison while the melodic line in the soprano voice remains most prominent.

The first recitative "Che vidi oh Ciel" is notated with a key signature of one flat and suggests to be in the key of d minor. The violins and basso continuo open in B-flat unison as the soprano joins on a B diminished chord. The soprano sings: "Heavens! Oh Heavens! Tirsi is languishing, and his face darkens with sorrow. Beside him, his faithful consort piteously expresses in a sad song the harsh pain in her heart, which arouses her bitter weeping. Or else, remaining silent, her glance seems to speak to him, saying "Are you leaving me and abandoning me?" The recitative continues with the minor feel and does not sound like d minor until the last six measures, showing clear cadential movement in the accompaniment to a half cadence.

The second recitative "Priva del caro bene" also suggests a minor feel throughout even though the key signature reads as C major. There is no clear indication of key until it cadences the last two beats in D major. The soprano begins the recitative with the basso continuo, and the violins join in the 19th measure.

=== Arias ===
The arias are significantly longer than the recitatives and exhibit a polyphonic texture. They feature Lombard rhythms throughout, numerous written ornaments in the melody, and slow rate of harmonic change associated with the pre-Classical style. Tonal center is more apparent in the arias than in the recitatives.

Both arias "Ben crudele" and "Se nube oscura" are examples of the da capo aria form. "Ben crudele" is in the key of C major, and "Se nube oscura" is in the key of B-flat major. Both arias have an A section which contains three ritornellos in the accompaniment answered by two statements and an embellished cadenza from the soprano. In "Ben crudele," the B section modulates to A minor and comprises two statements from the soloist. In "Se nuba oscura," the B section modulates to D minor with a meter change and slowing in rhythm.
