= Charles Shere =

American composer (1935–2020)

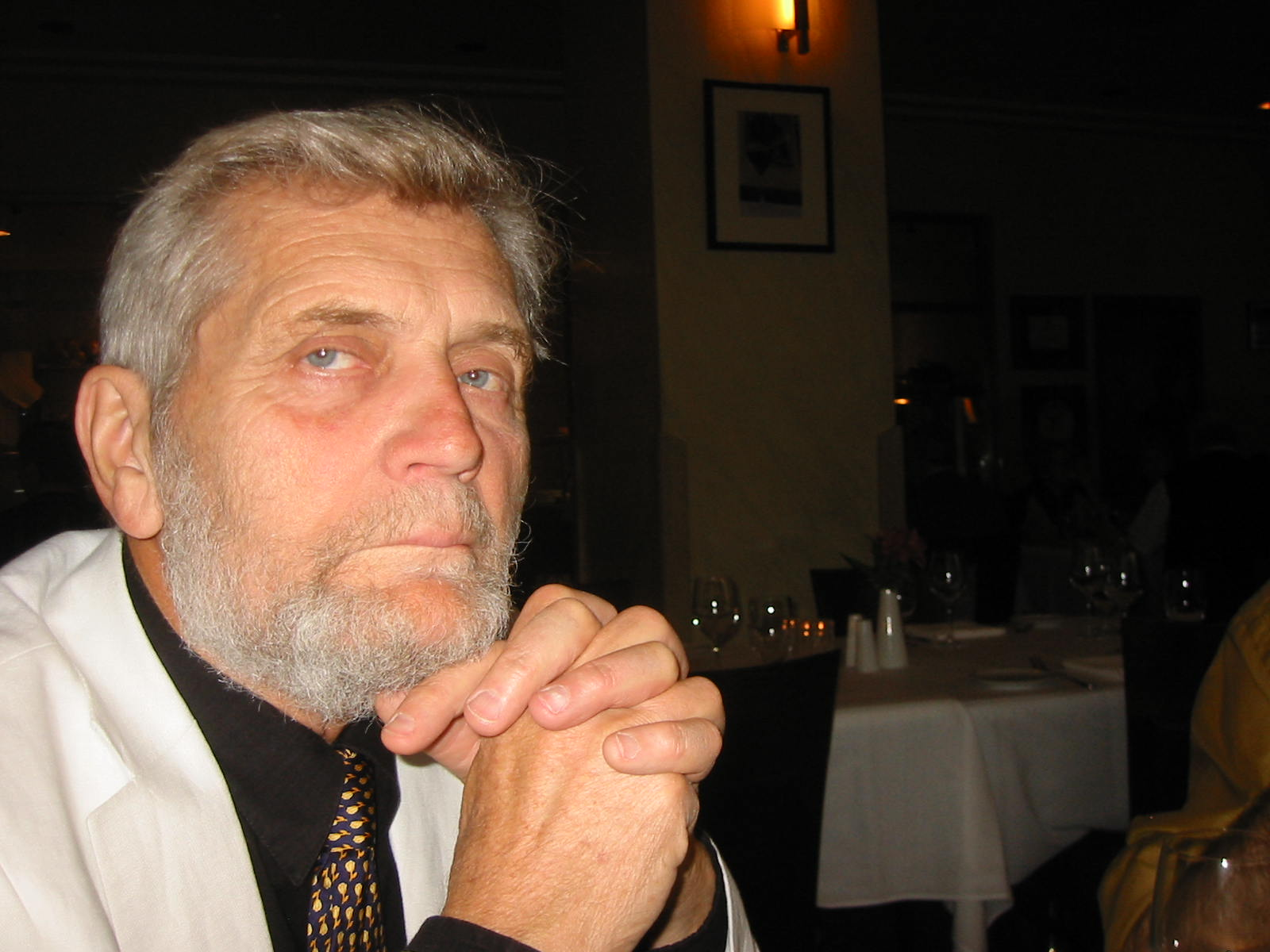
- Born: August 20, 1935; Berkeley, California, U.S.
- Died: December 15, 2020 (aged 85); Healdsburg, California, U.S.
- Occupation: Composer
- Spouse: Lindsey Remolif Shere

Charles Shere (August 20, 1935 — December 15, 2020) was an American composer. He studied composition briefly with Robert Erickson and Luciano Berio but was largely self-taught. His music was primarily in unconventional notations and open form through the 1970s and early 1980s, but turned to more conventional forms (though not expression) thereafter. He was Music Director of radio KPFA in Berkeley in the late 1960s, a producer at KQED-TV in San Francisco from 1967 to 1971, and music critic of the Oakland (California) Tribune from 1971 to his retirement in 1988, and taught music history (and occasionally composition) at Mills College (Oakland, California) from 1971 to 1986.

Principal work includes the opera The Bride stripped bare by her bachelors, even (1964–1986), after the painting by Marcel Duchamp, a Symphony in three movements (1989), concerti for piano and for violin (1964; 1989), a number of songs, the piano sonatas Bachelor machine (1985) and Compositio ut explicatio (2006), and various pieces for chamber ensembles.

His books include Thinking sound music: the life and work of Robert Erickson, "How I Read Stein," "How I Saw Duchamp," and (as co-editor) Everbest ever: correspondence [by Virgil Thomson] with Bay Area friends, and he has written numerous reviews and biographical notices for periodicals and reference books.

He was the recipient of two fellowships from the National Endowment for the Arts (as an art critic and an opera composer), and is the subject of an article in the New Grove Dictionary of Music and Musicians.
