= Jérôme Hantaï =

French musician

- Born: 1961 (age 64–65); Paris, France
- Genres: Renaissance, Baroque, Classical
- Instruments: viola da gamba, fortepiano

Jérôme Hantaï (born 1961) is a viola da gamba player and fortepianist.

== Biography ==
Son of the painters Simon Hantaï and Zsuzsa Hantaï, Jérôme Hantaï grew up outside Paris. He was initially self-taught and played the recorder, harpsichord, fortepiano, and viola da gamba. He went on to study gamba with Wieland Kuijken at the Royal Conservatory of Brussels, where he received a Premier Prix diploma in 1984.

As a gamba and violone player, he has performed with numerous pioneers of the early music movement, including Sigiswald and Wieland Kuijken, René Jacobs, and Jean-Claude Malgoire. In France, he participated in the formation some of the first early music ensembles, such as the Orchestre Baroque d’Île-de-France and the Ensemble Orlando Gibbons. He is best known as a member of the Trio Hantaï, where he plays alongside his brothers Marc (traverso) and Pierre (harpsichord). In 2018, he founded the Duo Gordis-Hantaï with the harpsichordist Lillian Gordis.

He additionally records and tours as a fortepianist and gamba player and founded and directs the viol consort, Spes Nostra (formerly the Ensemble Jérôme Hantaï) and the Trio Almaviva. He has recorded music of Marin Marais, W.A. Mozart, and Joseph Haydn for Naïve, Virgin Veritas, Musicales Actes-Sud, and most recently, Mirare and received numerous prizes, including two Diapasons d’Or and a Choc du Monde de la musique.

== Discography ==
=== Solo ===
- 2019: Haydn/Mozart Sonates. Mirare
- 2015: Consort Music au temps de Shakespeare : William Byrd et ses contemporains / Spes Nostra. Musicales Actes-Sud
- 2005: Joseph Haydn: Sonates pour pianoforte. Ambroisie
- 2005: Music for Bass Viols. Virgin Veritas
- 2004: John Jenkins: Fantazia / Ensemble Jérôme Hantaï. Ambronay Éditions / Naïve
- 2001: Marais: Pièces à 2 et à 3 violes / Jérôme Hantaï, Kaori Uemura, Alix Verzier, Pierre Hantaï. Virgin Veritas
- 2001: Marais: Pièces de viole, vol. 2. Virgin Veritas
- 1999: Trios pour pianoforte, violon et violoncelle, no. 36, 37 et 40 / Jérôme Hantaï, Philippe Couvert, Alix Verzier. Astrée Naïve
- 1999: Pièces pour deux basses de viole / Jérôme Hantaï, Kaori Uemura. Virgin Veritas
- 1997: Marais: Pièces de viole. Virgin Veritas

=== Other ===
- 2005: Cecilia Bartoli: Opera Probita. Decca
- 2004: François Couperin : La Sultanne, Préludes & Concerts royaux / Alfredo Bernardini, François Fernandez, Emmanuel Balssa, Elisabeth Joyé. Alpha
- 2001: Beethoven: Irish and Scottish Songs / Sophie Daneman, Paul Agnew, Peter Harvey. Astrée Naïve
- 2000: Deutsche Kantaten: Tunder, Kuhnau, Bruhns, Graupner / Collegium Vocale Gent, dir. Philippe Herreweghe. Harmonia Mundi France
- 1999: JS Bach, Sonates pour flûte / Trio Hantaï and Ageet Zweistra. Virgin Veritas
- 1992: Tous les matins du monde [soundtrack]. Alia Vox
- 1991: Christmas Concerto, Sonatas after Concerti Grossi op. VI / Le Concert Français. Opus 111
- 1990: Delalande: Symphonies pour le Souper du Roy / Ensemble La Simphonie du Marais, Hugo Reyne. Harmonia Mundi
