= John Whitelaw (harpsichordist) =

American-born Canadian harpsichordist (born 1943)

- Born: 1943 (age 82–83); New York City, United States
- Origin: Canada
- Education: Student of Kenneth Gilbert (1967–1971); Conservatoire de musique du Québec; McGill University
- Occupation: Harpsichordist
- Instruments: Harpsichord, piano, clavichord, fortepiano
- Works: Studio recording of William Byrd (1996)
- Years active: 1970s–present
- Formerly of: Five Centuries Ensemble
- Awards: Prix d'Europe (1970); Finalist, ARD International Music Competition (1970); Second prize, Musica Antiqua Bruges (1971)

John Whitelaw (born 1943) is an American-born Canadian harpsichordist who won international prizes such as the Prix d'Europe in the early 1970s and released a studio recording of works by William Byrd in 1996.

== Life and career ==
Born in New York in 1943, Whitelaw was originally trained as a pianist at liberal arts colleges in Tennessee, Indianapolis, and Chicago. He was a student of Kenneth Gilbert in Montreal from 1967-1971; during which time he also pursued further music studies at the Conservatoire de musique du Québec and McGill University. In 1970 he won the Prix d'Europe. That same year he was a finalist at the ARD International Music Competition in Munich and was awarded the Premier Prix by the Conservatoire de musique du Québec. In 1971 he won second prize at the Musica Antiqua Bruges competition in Belgium, and third prize at the international harpsichord competition in Paris, which at least one contemporary music critic, Jacques Longchampt, described as "strange".

While continuing his education in Canada, Whitelaw simultaneously worked as a music faculty member at the University of Ottawa. He also was the director of the Montreal Chamber Singers. After leaving Canada, he worked as a longtime faculty member of the Royal Conservatory in Ghent. In 1976 he toured Australia as the harpsichordist in the Five Centuries Ensemble. In 1996, he released a studio recording of works by William Byrd. He has also played the clavichord, the forte-piano and the piano, in particular accompanying South African soprano Gerda Hartman in, notably, the repertoire of the German Lied.
