= Francesco Cera =

Francesco Cera (born in Bologna, Italy) is an Italian harpsichordist, organist and conductor. Accomplished performer of Italian Baroque harpsichord and organ repertoire, he was a student of Gustav Leonhardt in Amsterdam (1989–90), then in 1991 became member of the ensemble Il Giardino Armonico. Since 1997 he has been director of the Ensemble Arte Musica, specializing in Italian vocal repertoire from Gesualdo and Monteverdi to 18th-century cantatas. Cera has held master classes at the Smarano Organ Academy and the Piccola Accademia Montisi.

== Discography ==
Cera has made many recordings of Italian harpsichord music (Rossi, Merula, Storace, Valente and Domenico Scarlatti) for Tactus (record label), Bach's French Suites and harpsichord concertos for the Arts label, Bach's Orgelbüchlein, D'Anglebert's complete harpsichord works, Trabaci's organ and harpsichord works, Scarlatti and the Neapolitan Song for label Brilliant Classics. His ensemble Arte Musica made their concert debut at the Flanders Festival in Bruges in 1997, and their first recording of sacred music by Giovanni Paolo Colonna; they recorded Gesualdo's Tenebrae Responsoria for label Brilliant Classics. In 2001, he recorded Saint-Saëns’s Requiem, conducted by Diego Fasolis for Chandos (2004).
