= Lillian Gordis =

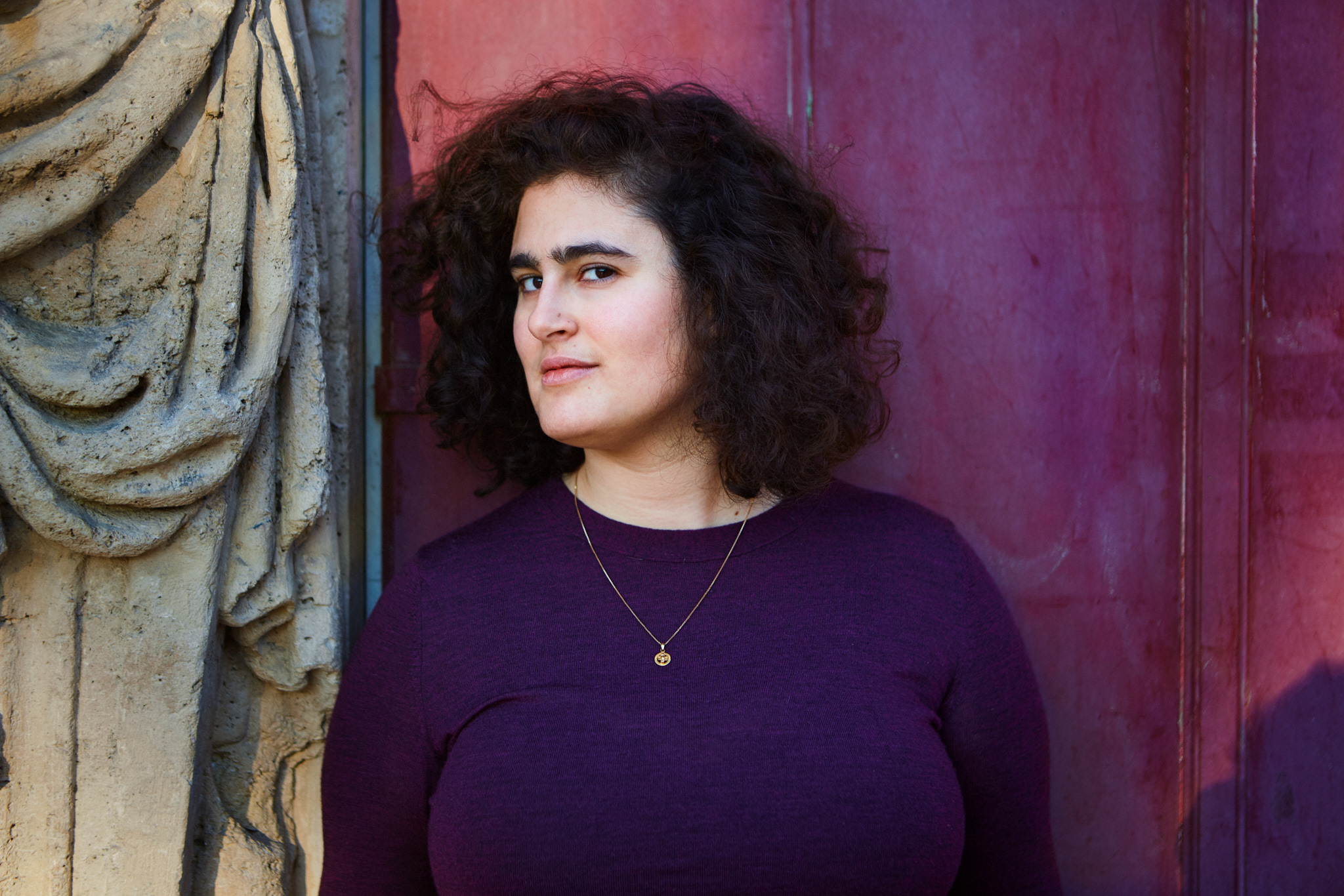

Background information
- Born: July 12, 1992 (age 33); Berkeley, California
- Genres: Renaissance, Baroque
- Instrument: Harpsichord
- Website: lillian-gordis.com

Lillian Gordis (born July 12, 1992, Berkeley, California) is an American-born harpsichordist who moved to France when she was 16.

== Biography ==
Lillian Gordis began studying the harpsichord at age 9 with Katherine Roberts Perl and then Arthur Haas in New York City. At the encouragement of Pierre Hantaï, she moved to France at age 16 to study privately with him as well as with Bertrand Cuiller and Skip Sempé. In 2018, she obtained a joint master's degree in musicology and early music performance at the Université Paris-Sorbonne.

As a soloist, she has been invited on the radio show Génération Jeunes Interprètes on France Musique and has participated in festivals in Europe and the United States, such as Sinfonia en Périgord, the Printemps de Lanvellec, Jeunes Talents, Paris Clavecin Festival, Clavecin en Fête, Festival de Richelieu, Voyage dans l’Hiver (Moulin d’Andé), Petits Concerts dans les Copeaux, L’Art de la Fugue, Oude Muziek Utrecht Fringe, and at the Théatre des Champs-Elysées, Muziekgebouw aan’t IJ, Museo Musica Bologna, and MusicSources Berkeley; she was also invited to play with the Orchestre Français des Jeunes Baroque in 2017 under the direction of Rinaldo Alessandrini and with the Orchestre de Chambre de Paris under the direction of Giuliano Carmignola and Fabio Biondi with Vivica Genaux and Sonia Prina.

In 2018, she formed the Duo Gordis-Hantaï with Jérôme Hantaï (viola da gamba). She maintains regular activity as a chamber musician.

She is a four-time laureate of the Fondation Royaumont (in 2013 and from 2015 to 2017) and is supported by the Fondation d’entreprise Safran.

In 2019, her first solo album, Zones, dedicated to the sonatas of Domenico Scarlatti, was released on the label Paraty (Harmonia Mundi-PIAS). Lauded as "a Martha Argerich of the harpsichord," she is the first woman in France in 43 years—since Blandine Verlet (Philips, 1976)—to have released a solo recording of Scarlatti sonatas on the harpsichord.

In the 2023-2024 academic year, Lillian Gordis was the visiting harpsichord professor at Oberlin Conservatory. Starting in Fall 2024, she became the chair of baroque music and assistant professor of harpsichord at University of Colorado Boulder.

== Discography ==
- 2019: Zones: Domenico Scarlatti. Harpsichord sonatas by Domenico Scarlatti. Label: Paraty PTY 919180 (Harmonia Mundi-PIAS).
- 2022: BACH. English Suites, Partitas, Preludes and Fugues from the Well-Tempered Clavier, Book II
- 2026: J.S. Bach: Partita no. 6, English Suite no. 6, 6 Preludes & Fugues. Partita No. 6, English Suite No. 6, 6 Preludes and Fugues from the Well-Tempered Clavier, Book II
