= Pierre Hantaï =

French conductor and harpsichordist

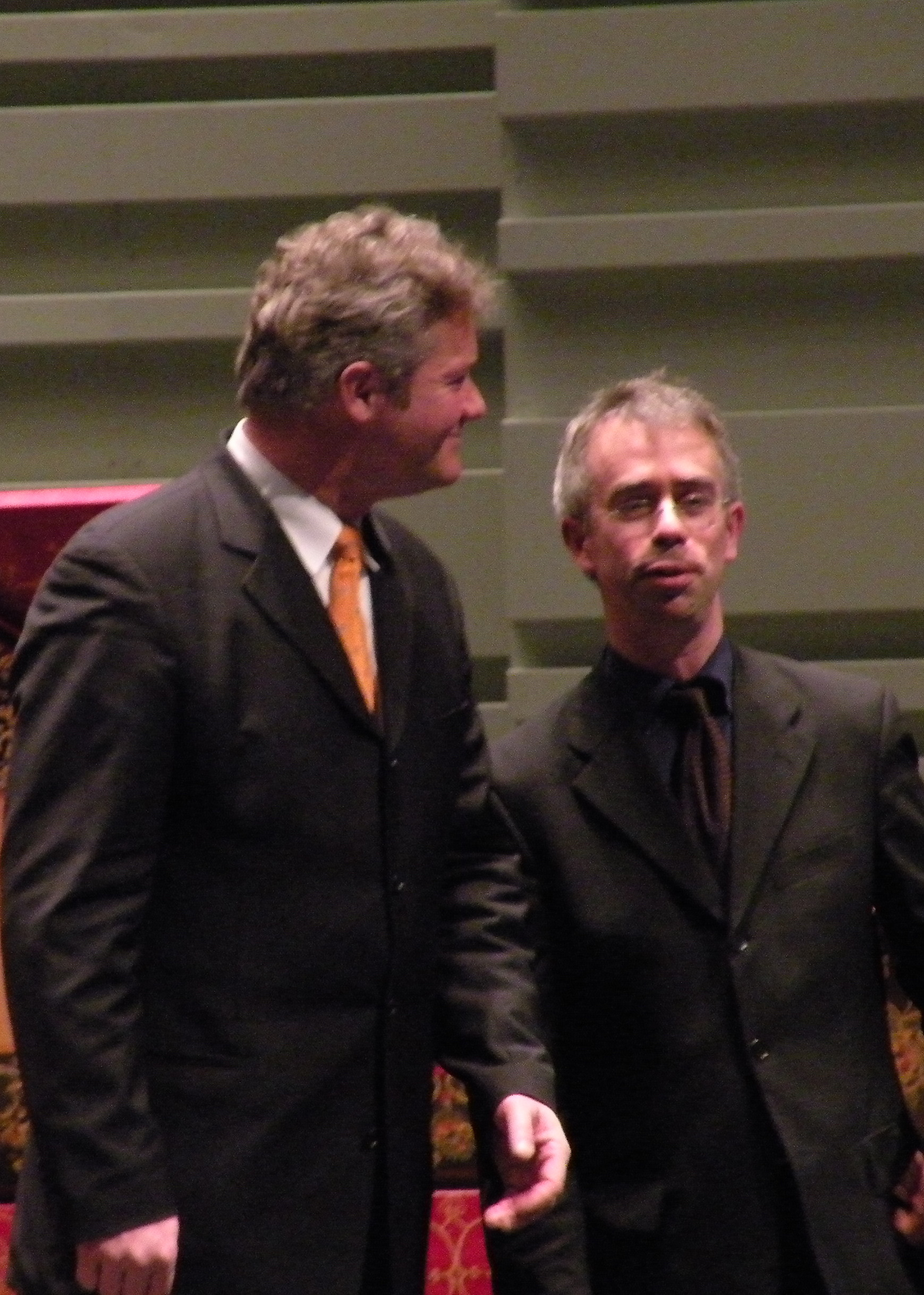
Pierre Hantaï (right) during La Folle Journée festival in Nantes in 2009.

Pierre Hantaï (born 28 February 1964, Paris) is a French harpsichordist and conductor.

== Career ==
The son of painter Simon Hantaï, he discovered the music of Johann Sebastian Bach when he was ten and first heard Gustav Leonhardt's recordings when he was eleven. He took up the harpsichord when he was eleven and was self-taught until meeting his first teacher, the American harpsichordist Arthur Haas. He later studied for two years in Amsterdam with Gustav Leonhardt. In 1983 he won the second prize in the Bruges harpsichord competition.

His first recordings focused on the English virginalists (Giles Farnaby and John Bull), and on Bach. Influential solo recordings include two Goldberg Variations, released ten years apart (1993, 2003), and an ongoing series of Domenico Scarlatti’s sonatas. Following a first CD for Astrée in 1993, he has recorded six more volumes of Scarlatti recitals for Mirare between 2002 and 2019. Other solo recordings include the Well-Tempered Clavier, Book I, three recordings dedicated to Bach’s toccatas and suites, as well as recordings of Frescobaldi and Couperin.

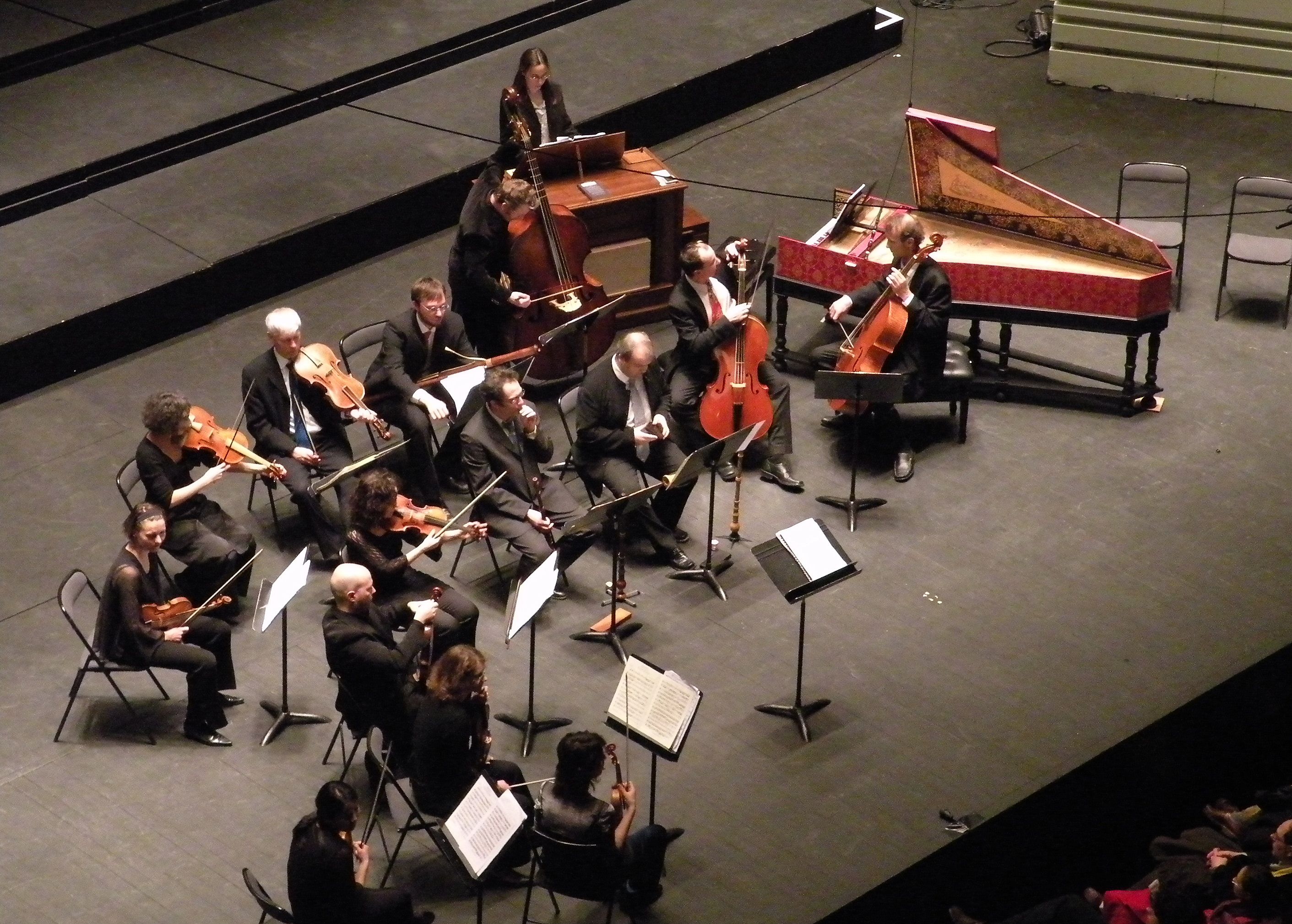
Le Concert Français preparing to play under Pierre Hantai in 2009.

He performs internationally as a soloist across Europe, North America and Asia at festivals such as La Roque d'Anthéron, La Folle Journée de Nantes, Festival Oude Muziek Utrecht, the Boston Early Music Festival, at Carnegie Hall, the Fundação Calouste Gulbenkian, and Hakuju Hall in Tokyo.

In 1991, he and his brother Jérôme recorded part of the soundtrack to the French film Tous les matins du monde.

In 1985, he founded the ensemble Le Concert Français, which he conducted from the harpsichord and which recorded both orchestral and chamber repertoire.

He frequently performs with his two brothers, Marc (traverso) and Jérôme (viola da gamba) as part of the Trio Hantaï. He played for many years with La Petite Bande (directed by Sigiswald Kuijken), and he continues to perform with Jordi Savall, Amandine Beyer, Hugo Reyne, and Maude Gratton. He has collaborated with many other musicians, including Philippe Herreweghe and Marc Minkowski.

== Teaching ==
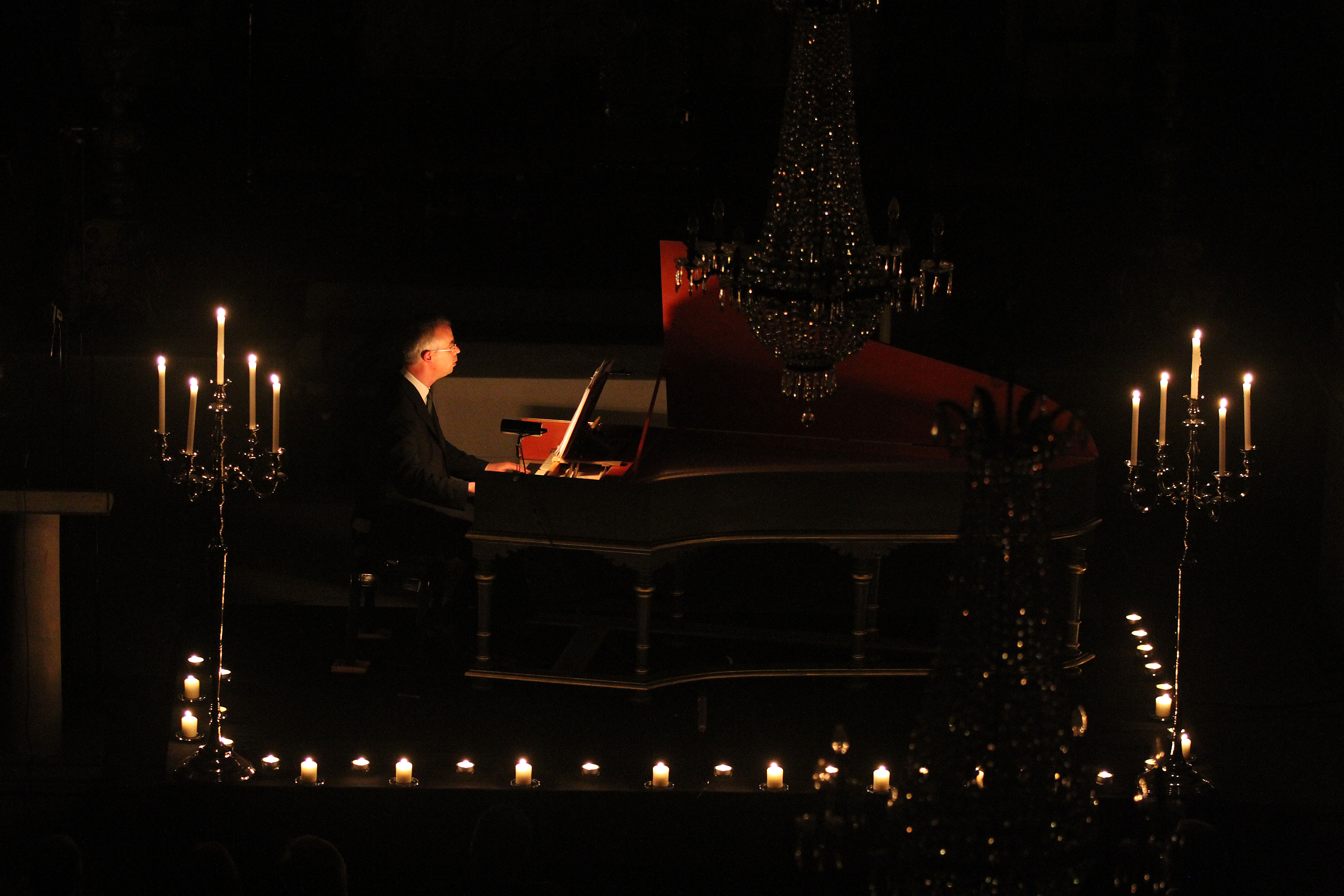
Hantaï performing in 2011

Pierre Hantaï has never held a permanent teaching post in a conservatory.

During the 1990s, he taught privately. His students, including Bertrand Cuiller and Maude Gratton, continued their studies at the CNSM de Paris with Christophe Rousset and Olivier Baumont. In 2000, Hantaï replaced Rousset, then the harpsichord professor at the CNSM, during his sabbatical year. At the end of the year, Rousset quit and a job search was held as a formality, with the expectation that Hantaï would succeed Rousset and continue to work with his students at the CNSM. In what one student called an unexpected twist that shook the harpsichord class, though, he lost the post to Baumont, who has been the harpsichord professor at the CNSM since 2001.

Since then, he has largely limited his teaching activities to master classes (Villa Medici, Fondation Royaumont, Académie de Villecroze, Accademia Europea Villa Bossi, etc.). He tutored the harpsichordist Lillian Gordis between 2009 and 2013.

== Discography ==
=== Solo recordings ===
- 1990: Giles Farnaby: Farnaby's Dreame, Accord
- 1990: Wolfgang Amadeus Mozart: Concerti per cembalo; Sonatas; Menuets, Opus 111
- 1993: Domenico Scarlatti: 22 sonates, Astrée
- 1993: Bach: Goldberg Variationen [1992 Recording], Opus 111
- 1994: Bach: Concertos pour clavecin, Le Concert Français, Astrée
- 1995: John Bull: Doctor Bull's Good Night, Astrée
- 1997: Girolamo Frescobaldi: Partite et Toccate, Astrée
- 1997: Bach: Chromatic Fantasy and Fugue - Toccatas, Virgin Veritas
- 1999: Bach: Works for Harpsichord, Virgin Veritas
- 2002: Scarlatti 1, Ambroisie
- 2002: Scarlatti 2, Mirare
- 2003: Bach: Le Clavier bien tempéré, Premier livre, Mirare
- 2004: Bach: Variations Goldberg, Mirare
- 2006: Scarlatti 3, Mirare
- 2008: François Couperin: Pièces de clavecin, Mirare
- 2012: Jean-Philippe Rameau: Symphonies à deux clavecins, Mirare
- 2014: Bach: Suites anglaises n^{o} 2 et 6; Concerto italien, Mirare
- 2014: Magnificat et Concerti : A. Vivaldi, J.S. Bach, Jordi Savall & La Capella Reial de Catalunya, Alia Vox
- 2014: Bach: Concertos for Two Harpsichords, with Aapo Häkkinen, Helsinki Baroque Orchestra, Aeolus
- 2016: Scarlatti 4, Mirare
- 2017: Scarlatti 5, Mirare, mention « Choc de Classica »
- 2019: Scarlatti 6, Mirare
- 2020: Handel: Suites pour clavecin. Mirare
- 2021: Handel; Scarlatti. Mirare
- 2023: Scarlatti: 100 Sonates pour clavecin. Mirare

=== Orchestral and chamber music ===
- 1991: Christmas Concerto, Sonatas after Concerti Grossi op. VI / Le Concert Français, Opus 111
- 1992: Maskes & Fantazies / Le Concert Français. Naïve
- 1997: Marin Marais: Pièces de viole / Jérôme Hantaï. Virgin Veritas
- 1997: Jean-Marie Leclair: Sonates pour violon et basse continue, Livre IV / François Fernandez. Naïve
- 2002: Pavana: The Virgin Harpsichord / Skip Sempé. Astrée
- 2003: Marais: Pièces à deux et à trois violes / Jérôme Hantaï. Warner Classics
- 2003: Georg Philipp Telemann : Essercizii Musici / Le Concert Français. Naïve
- 2005: Bach: Sonates pour flûte / Marc Hantaï, Jérôme Hantaï. Warner Classics
- 2005: Marais: Pièces de viole, vol. 2 / Jérôme Hantaï. Warner Classics
- 2006: Bach: Suites pour orchestre nos. 1 & 4, Sonate pour violon et clavecin no. 4 / Le Concert Français. Mirare
- 2018: Bach: Sonatas for flute and harpsichord / Marc Hantaï. Mirare
