= Gustav Leonhardt =

Dutch keyboard player, conductor, musicologist, teacher and editor

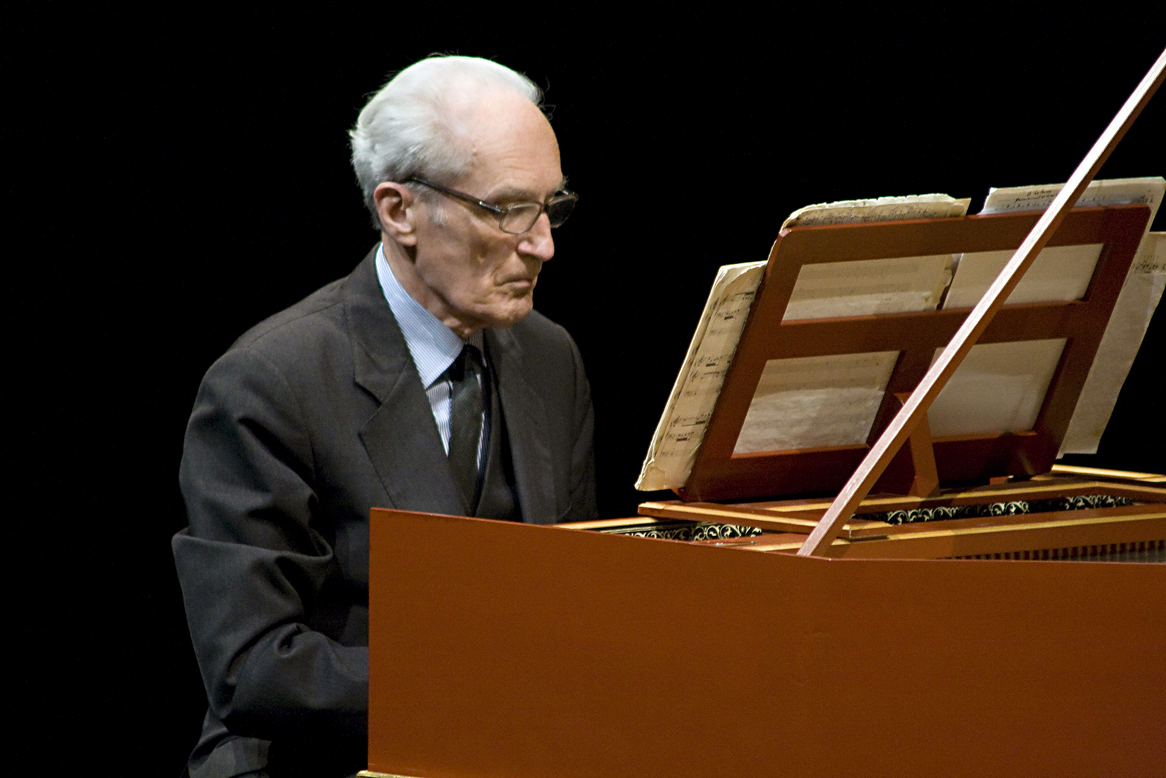
- Leonhardt at the MAfestival Brugge
- Born: 30 May 1928 's-Graveland, Netherlands
- Died: 16 January 2012 (aged 83); Amsterdam, Netherlands
- Occupations: Conductor; Harpsichordist
- Organizations: Leonhardt-Consort

Gustav Maria Leonhardt (30 May 1928 – 16 January 2012) was a Dutch keyboardist, conductor, musicologist, teacher and editor. He was a leading figure in the historically informed performance movement to perform music on period instruments.

Leonhardt professionally played many instruments, including the harpsichord, pipe organ, claviorganum (a combination of harpsichord and organ), clavichord, fortepiano, and piano. He also conducted orchestras and choruses.

== Biography ==
Gustav Leonhardt was born in 's-Graveland, near Hilversum, and studied organ and harpsichord from 1947 to 1950 with Eduard Müller at the Schola Cantorum Basiliensis in Basel. In 1950, he made his debut as a harpsichordist in Vienna, where he studied musicology. He was professor of harpsichord at the Academy of Music from 1952 to 1955 and at the Amsterdam Conservatory from 1954. He was also a church organist.

== Career ==
Leonhardt performed and conducted a variety of solo, chamber, orchestral, operatic, and choral music from the Renaissance, Baroque and Classical periods. The many composers whose music he recorded as a harpsichordist, organist, clavichordist, fortepianist, chamber musician or conductor included Johann Sebastian Bach, Carl Philipp Emanuel Bach, Wilhelm Friedemann Bach, Heinrich Biber, John Blow, Georg Böhm, William Byrd, André Campra, François Couperin, Louis Couperin, John Dowland, Jacques Duphly, Antoine Forqueray, Girolamo Frescobaldi, Johann Jakob Froberger, Orlando Gibbons, André Grétry, George Frideric Handel, Jacques-Martin Hotteterre, Jean-Baptiste Lully, Claudio Monteverdi, Wolfgang Amadeus Mozart, Georg Muffat, Johann Pachelbel, Henry Purcell, Jean-Philippe Rameau, Christian Ritter, Johann Rosenmüller, Domenico Scarlatti, Agostino Steffani, Jan Pieterszoon Sweelinck, Georg Philipp Telemann, Francisco Valls, Antonio Vivaldi, and Matthias Weckmann.

Central to Leonhardt's career was Johann Sebastian Bach. Leonhardt first recorded music of the composer in the early 1950s, with recordings in 1953 of the Goldberg Variations and The Art of Fugue. The latter embodies the thesis he had published the previous year arguing that the work was intended for the keyboard, a conclusion now widely accepted. The recordings helped establish his reputation as a distinguished harpsichordist and Bach interpreter. In 1954 he led the Leonhardt Baroque Ensemble with the English countertenor Alfred Deller in a pioneering recording of two Bach cantatas. The ensemble included his wife Marie Leonhardt, Eduard Melkus (violins), Alice Harnoncourt-Hoffelner (violin, viola), Nikolaus Harnoncourt (cello), and Michel Piguet (oboe).

In 1971, Leonhardt and Harnoncourt undertook the project of recording the complete Bach cantatas; the two conductors divided up the cantatas and recorded their assigned cantatas with their own ensembles. The project, the first cycle on period instruments, ended up taking nineteen years, from 1971 to 1990. In addition, Leonhardt recorded Bach's St Matthew Passion, Mass in B minor, Magnificat, and the complete secular cantatas, as well as the harpsichord concertos, Brandenburg Concertos, and most of his chamber and keyboard music; he recorded Bach's Goldberg Variations (three times), Partitas (twice), The Art of Fugue (twice), The Well-Tempered Clavier, French Suites, English Suites (twice), Inventions and Sinfonias, and many other individual works for the harpsichord, clavichord, or organ. To the surprise of some of his associates, Leonhardt accepted the role of Johann Sebastian Bach (played in a wig) in The Chronicle of Anna Magdalena Bach, a 1968 film by Jean-Marie Straub and Danièle Huillet.

Between 1974 and 1990, Leonhardt served as editor of the primary scholarly collection of the works of Jan Pieterszoon Sweelinck, which is noted as SwWV or L.

== Influence and awards ==
The keyboardist, conductor and scholar John Butt said, "...there's absolutely no doubting the enormous influence [Leonhardt] held over multiple generations of music making in the Baroque field"; in this discussion, Butt spoke of how much he learned from Leonhardt when preparing a chorus for him in the early 1990s. More generally, Leonhardt significantly influenced the technique and style of many harpsichordists through his teaching, editions, and recordings; his students and collaborators included harpsichordists and keyboard players such as Robert Hill, Bob van Asperen, John Butt, Lucy Carolan, Lisa Crawford, Alan Curtis, Menno van Delft, Richard Egarr, John Fesperman, John Gibbons, Pierre Hantaï, Frederick Renz, Elaine Thornburgh, Ketil Haugsand, Siebe Henstra, Philippe Herreweghe, Christopher Hogwood, Ton Koopman, Karyl Louwenaar, Charlotte Mattax, Davitt Moroney, Jacques Ogg, Martin Pearlman (music director of Boston Baroque), Edward Parmentier, Christophe Rousset, Louise Spizizen, Andreas Staier, Skip Sempé, Peter Waldner, Francesco Cera, Domenico Morgante, Jeannette Sorrell (music director of Apollo's Fire, The Cleveland Baroque Orchestra), Colin Tilney, Glen Wilson, and Chris Mary Francine Whittle.

Butt argues that Leonhardt's influence is not necessarily a simple, direct matter, but that some of his students consciously or unconsciously tried to play differently than he did. In comparing recordings of Bach's Goldberg Variations, Butt asserts that a "classic case" of the anxiety of influence is at work in the Goldberg recording by Ton Koopman, in which "what is immediately evident is the incessant ornamentation added to virtually every measure, often regardless of whether there is already obvious ornamentation in the notation.... my immediate reaction is often that this performance's principal message is 'Not Leonhardt'." Similarly, he says that "Bob van Asperen takes [Leonhardt's] rhythmic subtlety to a new extreme and perhaps presents the most rhythmically nuanced account of the work [The Goldberg Variations], one that will be ideal to some and mannered to others." By contrast, Butt argues, the younger Christophe Rousset plays the Goldberg Variations in a "meat-and-potatoes" manner with "a steady rhythm, even articulation, and a matter-of-fact presentation with little extra ornamentation," demonstrating that "certainly Rousset does not seem to count among the 'radical reactivists' [to Leonhardt] such as Koopman and van Asperen."

Leonhardt served as a member of the jury for the triennial International Harpsichord Concours of the Musica Antiqua Bruges. He was the only jury member who had participated in all sixteen juries from 1965 to 2010.

Among the awards given to him were the Medal of Honour for the Arts and Sciences from the Netherlands, presented to him by Queen Beatrix in 2009, and the 1980 Erasmus Prize, which he shared with Nicolaus Harnoncourt; it honored their recording of the complete Bach cantatas. (Leonhardt donated the money he received from the Erasmus Prize to Oudezijds 100, an ecumenical Christian charity operating "in the red-light district [of] Amsterdam" that "addresses the issues of drug-addicts, prostitutes, refugees, and the homeless."). Leonhardt was doctor honoris causa of the universities of Dallas, Amsterdam, Harvard, Metz and Padua. In 2007, he was made Commander of the Ordre des Arts et des Lettres in France, and in 2008, Commander of the Order of the Crown in Belgium.

Leonhardt gave his last public performance on 12 December 2011 at the Théâtre des Bouffes du Nord in Paris. Thereafter, he announced his retirement due to illness and cancelled all of his 2012 engagements. He died of cancer in Amsterdam on Monday, 16 January 2012, aged 83.

Two asteroids were named after him: 9903 Leonhardt and 12637 Gustavleonhardt.

== Collection ==
Leonhardt lived in a canal house on the Herengracht dating from about 1617, the Huis Bartolotti, and was a collector of decorative arts, paintings, and engravings. In 2014, his collection was auctioned by Sotheby's. His instruments were sold to a few former students, including Skip Sempé, Siebe Henstra and Pierre Hantaï.

== Bibliography ==
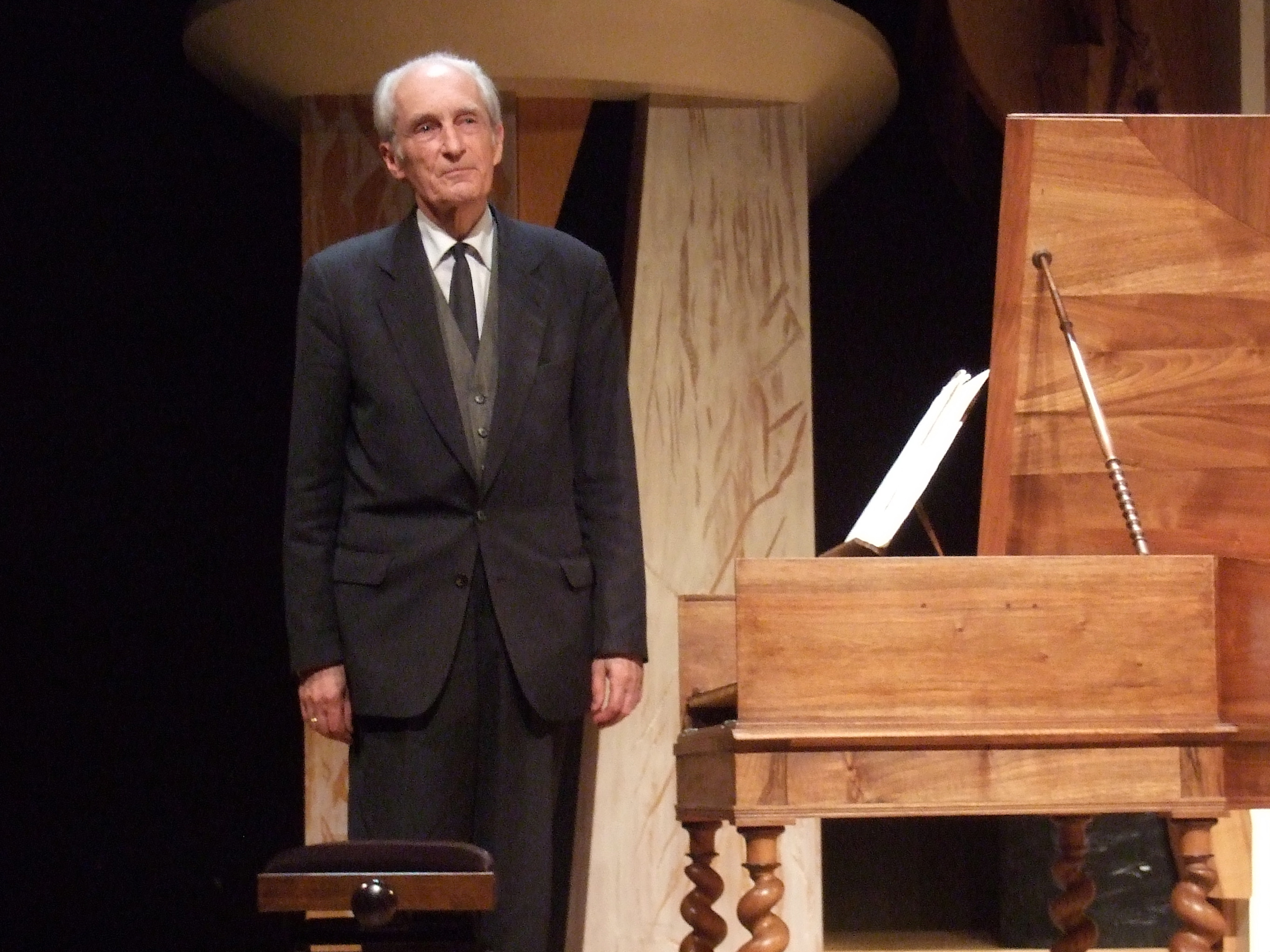
Gustav Leonhardt in Paris in 2008 External audio: Gustav Leonhardt performs music from Bach's Notenbüchlein für Anna Magdalena Bach; Here on Archive.org

- The art of fugue: Bach's last harpsichord work (Nijhoff, 1952)
- In Praise of Flemish Virginals (in Keyboard instruments, by Edwin Ripin et al., Edinburgh University Press, 1971)
- Amsterdams Onvoltooid Verleden [Amsterdam's unachieved past], Architectura & Natura, Amsterdam, November 1996
- "Glanz des alten Klavierklanges" (sleeve text for "Gustav Leonhardt an historischen Cembali", BMG)
- About The art of fugue (sleeve text for recording Deutsche Harmonia Mundi, 1969)
- "Introduction", in Early Music, vol. 7, No. 4, Keyboard Issue 1 (October 1979)
- "Points d'interrogation dans Froberger", in Hommage à F.L. Tagliavini (Patrone Editore, Bologna, 1995
- Het huis Bartolotti en zijn bewoners [Bartolotti's house and its inhabitants], (Amsterdam, Meulenhoff, 1979)
