= Louise Spizizen =

Louise Fleur Meyers Schlesinger Spizizen (August 24, 1928 - July 2, 2010) was an American composer, critic, harpsichordist/pianist, and singer. She is best remembered today for her research and controversial claim that pianist Johana Harris actually composed music that was published under the name of her husband, Roy Harris.

Spizizen was born in Lynn, Massachusetts, to Lillian Gordon and Louis Samuel Meyers. After growing up in Kansas City, Missouri, she earned music degrees from Vassar College and the University of California, San Diego. Her teachers included Robert Erickson, Kenneth Galburo, Gustav Leonhardt, Josef Mars, John Metz, Wilbur Ogdon, Wallingford Riegger, and Roslyn Tureck.

Spizizen married Eugene Richard Schlesinger in 1948 and they had three sons and a daughter before divorcing. She married Dr. John Spizizen in 1969.

Spizizen’s jobs included:

1949-1952 music director, Interplayers Inc. (New York)

1954-1957 singer/accompanist, Westchester County (New York) Civic Opera

1959-1965 singer/accompanist/composer, Madrigal Singers (Westport, Connecticut)

1960-1963 singer/accompanist, First Unitarian Church (Westport).

Spizizen also taught music privately and at the University of California. She published music reviews and criticism in the La Jolla Light, Los Angeles Times, San Diego Reader, and Tucson Weekly, as well as articles in various music journals (listed below). She appeared as an accompanist, harpsichordist, or singer with the Arizona Opera, Civic Orchestra of Tucson, and San Diego Symphony.

Spizizen created free lunchtime concert series in public venues such as shopping malls in San Diego and Tucson. She formed the Arizona Early Music Society and served as its president, and co-founded the Basically Baroque Symposium at the University of California San Diego. She received two commissions from the Westport Madrigal Singers, as well as a prize from Vassar College for her 1946 dance score/musical comedy, Sweep It Clean.

Spizizen spent the last decade of her life working on a biography of pianist Johana Harris, who she believed had actually composed some of the works published by Roy Harris. She died before completing the biography. Spizizen’s correspondence with author and composer Nicolas Slonimsky is archived in the Library of Congress Music Division. Spizizen’s music was published by Theodore Presser Co.

She died on July 2, 2010 in Tucson, Arizona, from complications of Alzheimer's disease.

== Articles/Lectures ==
- Johana and Roy Harris: Marrying a Real Composer (Musical Quarterly, Vol 77 No 4 1993)
- Johana and Roy Harris: Whose Music is it, Anyhow? (1996 College Music Society Conference)
- The Composer of Area Code 714 (Applause: San Diego Magazine of the Arts, Sep-Oct 1978)

== Works ==
=== Ballet ===
- Birthday of the Infanta (harpsichord, chamber orchestra and piano)

=== Harpsichord ===
- realizations of works by Heinrich Biber, Johan Friedrich Fasch, Jean-Marie Leclair, and Pietro Locatelli
- teaching pieces

=== Theatre ===
- six scores for Invisible Theatre productions
- Sweep It Clean (musical comedy)

=== Vocal ===
- Sacred Service for Reformed Jewish Congregation (women’s voices and organ)
- Three Games for Ten Players (string quintet and chorus)
- Three Rounds for Mothers (a cappella chorus)
- Weary with Toil (a cappella chorus)
