= Eiji Hashimoto =

Japanese harpsichordist (1931–2021)

- Born: 7 August 1931; Tokyo, Empire of Japan
- Died: 14 January 2021 (aged 89); Cincinnati, Ohio, United States
- Occupation: Harpsichordist

Eiji Hashimoto (7 August 1931 – 14 January 2021) was a Japanese harpsichordist, orchestra conductor, and classical music professor.

== Biography ==
Hashimoto studied music at the University of Tokyo, and subsequently at Yale University. He made his debut in New York City at The Town Hall in February 1964. At this baroque concert, he received positive reviews for his performances of Jean-Philippe Rameau and Domenico Scarlatti. He was then a professor at the University of Cincinnati.

Eiji Hashimoto died in Cincinnati on 14 January 2021, at the age of 89.

== Publications ==
- Pièces pour le clavecin (1985)
- Six keyboard sonatas with varied reprises (1988)
- Ninety sonatas (1999, 2012)

== Discography ==
- Eiji Hashimoto plays Händel & Scarlatti. (1988)
- Eighteen sonatas (1996)
- Harpsichord works (2002)
