= Judith Nelson =

American opera singer

Judith Anne Nelson, née Manes (10 September 1939 – 28 May 2012) was an American soprano, noted for her performances of baroque music at the beginning of the "early music revival" of the 1970s and 1980s.

Nelson was born in Evanston, Illinois. She graduated with a degree in music from St. Olaf College in Northfield, Minnesota in 1961. On August 5 of the same year she married Alan H. Nelson, with whom she moved to Berkeley, California.

In Paris, Nelson joined the Five Centuries Ensemble, then in 1976 she was a founding member, with William Christie, and Wieland Kuijken, of René Jacobs' Concerto Vocale, the chamber music ensemble which preceded Christie's own Les Arts Florissants in 1979. She also performed with Christopher Hogwood’s Academy of Ancient Music, and Anthony Rooley's Consort of Musicke - in soprano duets together with Emma Kirkby. Later she was one of the founding members of Nicholas McGegan's San Francisco-based Philharmonia Baroque Orchestra, specialising in Handel and Purcell.

In opera she made her debut in Brussels in 1979, in Monteverdi's L'incoronazione di Poppea under Alan Curtis. She was soprano for Christopher Hogwood's landmark January 1982 recording of Handel's Messiah, recorded in Westminster Abbey and videotaped by the BBC.

Nelson died, aged 72, in Albany, California.

== Selected discography ==
- 1979 Luigi Rossi Cantate Judith Nelson Wieland Kuijken William Christie (LP only)
- 1979 Franz Schubert Schubertiade Judith Nelson, Jörg Demus (LP only)
- 1979 Francesco Durante Duetti "Fiero, Acerbo Destin" Concerto Vocale (LP only)
- Mondonville: Pièces de clavecin avec voix ou violon. Judith Nelson, William Christie
- Pietro Antonio Cesti: Pasticcio. Judith Nelson, Mihoko Kimura, William Christie
- Montéclair: La Badine. Pan et Syrinx. William Christie
- Strozzi: Cantatas. Judith Nelson, Concerto Vocale
- André Campra : Requiem, Judith Nelson, Dinah Harris, sopranos, Jean-Claude Oriac, Wynford Evans, ténors, Stephen Roberts, basse, The Monteverdi Choir, English Baroque Soloists, John Eliot Gardiner, CD Erato, 1981 report Warner classics 2007.
- Marc-Antoine Charpentier :

Assumpta est Maria, Missa sex vocibus H.11, Dialogus inter Christum et peccatores H.425, Judith Nelson, Colette Alliot-Lugaz (d), John York-Skinner (hc), Michael Goldthorpe (t), Richard Jackson, Erian Rayner (b), English Bach Festival Chorus, English Bach Festival Baroque Orchestra. LP Erato STU 71281 - (recorded at All Saints Church Tooting Graveney, London 1978).

3 Leçons de Ténèbres du Mercredy Sainct, H.96, H.97, H.98, 3 Répons du Mercrediy Sainct, H.111, H.112, H.113, 3 Leçons de Ténèbres du Jeudy Sainct, H.102, H.103, H.109, Concerto Vocale, René Jacobs, haute-contre, Judith Nelson, soprano, Anne Verkinderen, soprano, William Christie, clavecin et orgue, Konrad Junghänel, théorbe, Wieland Kuijken, Adelheid Glatt, basse de viole (recorded 08/1977 and 01/1978) 3 LP Harmonia Mundi HM 1005/6/7.

3 Leçons de Ténèbres du Vendredy Sainct, H.105, H.106, H.110, 6 Répons du Mercredy Sainct. H.114.H.115, H.116, H.117, H.118, H.119, Concerto Vocale, René Jacobs, haute-contre, Judith Nelson, soprano, Anne Verkinderen, soprano, William Christie, clavecin et orgue, Konrad Junghänel, théorbe, Wieland Kuijken, Adelheid Glatt, basse de viole. (enregistré le 01/1978 et 01/1979) 2 LP Harmonia Mundi HM 1008/09.

Report in 3 CD ( without les Répons H.114, H.115, H.116, H.117, H.118, H.119), 3 Leçons de ténèbres du Mercredi Sainct, H.96, H.97, H.98 et 3 Répons du Mercredi Sainct, H.111, H.112, H.113, (HMC 901005 1978) - 3 Leçons de ténèbres du Jeudy Sainct, H.102, H.103, H.109 (HMC 901006 1978) - 3 Leçons de ténèbres du Vendredy Sainct, H.105, H.106, H.110 (HMC 901007 1979).

Motets à voix seule et à 2 voix, (H 21, H 22, H 27, H 127, H 134, H 245, H 273, H 280, H 343, H 349, H 350, H 373, H 423), Concerto vocale, René Jacobs, alto, Judith Nelson, soprano, William Christie, orgue, Konrad Junghänel, théorbe, Jaap ter Linden, violoncelle, Trix Landolf, Kathrin Bopp, violon- 1 CD - Harmonia Mundi (HMC 901149 07/1984).

- Music From the Time of Elizabeth I Hogwood
- Musique pour la Chambre du Roy Hogwood 2CD
- Handel: Alceste & Comus. Kirkby, Nelson, Kwella, Cable, Elliott, Thomas. AAM
- Handel: Apollo e Dafne. Nicholas Mcgegan
