= Will Ogdon =

American composer (1921–2013)

Wilbur Lee "Will' Ogdon (April 19, 1921 – October 6, 2013) was an American composer. He long taught at the University of California, San Diego, from 1966 to 1991.

== Life and career ==
Will Ogdon was born on April 19, 1921, originally from Redlands, California. He graduated from the University of Wisconsin–Madison School of Music in 1942 with a Bachelor of Arts in music. He graduated from Hamline University in 1947 with a Master of Arts. He studied composition with Ernst Krenek, Roger Sessions, and René Leibowitz. He acquired a doctorate in music theory from Indiana University School of Music.

He served for 3 1/2 years in the United States Army from 1942 to 1946. He was in the signal corps stationed in Belgium and became a sergeant.

He taught at the University of California, San Diego beginning in 1966, and retiring in 1991.) His students included composer Louise Spizizen. He lived in Del Mar, California.

He has collaborated with the singer Carol Plantamura.

== Discography ==
- 1997 - The Music Of Will Ogdon. Composers Recordings, Inc.
