= Concerto Vocale =

Belgian baroque musical ensemble

Concerto Vocale is a Belgian musical ensemble for baroque music.

== History ==
Concerto Vocale was founded in Amsterdam in 1977 by the Belgian countertenor and conductor René Jacobs, with Judith Nelson appearing on the first solo recordings.

In later years the vocal ensemble has included sopranos María Cristina Kiehr, and Martina Bovet, countertenor Andreas Scholl, tenors Gerd Türk and Matthias Widmaier, baritones Martin Hummel and Andreas Lebeda, and basses Ulrich Messthaler and Franz-Josef Selig.

It is complemented by an instrumental ensemble including, among others, Jean Tubéry, William Dongois and Gottfried Bach.

== Selected discography ==
- 1978: 3 Leçons de Ténèbres du Mercredy Sainct, H.96, H.97, H.98, 3 Répons du Mercrediy Sainct, H.111, H.112, H.113, 3 Leçons de Ténèbres du Jeudy Sainct, H.102, H.103, H.109 by Marc-Antoine Charpentier (recorded 08/1977 and 01/1978) 3 LP Harmonia Mundi HM 1005/6/7
- 1979: 3 Leçons de Ténèbres du Vendredy Sainct, H.105, H.106, H.110, 6 Répons du Mercredy Sainct. H.114.H.115, H.116, H.117, H.118, H.119 by Marc-Antoine Charpentier (Volume 2, recorded 01/1978 and 01/1979) 2 LP Harmonia Mundi HM 1008/09
- 1978 Handel Duetti E Cantate Da Camera
- 1979 Sigismondo d'India Duetti, Lamenti & Madrigali
- 1979 Antonio Cesti Cantate Pria Ch'Adori Amanti Io Vi Disfido Lacrime Mie Mia Tiranna
- 1979 Francesco Durante Duetti Da Camera "Fiero, Acerbo Destin" (LP only)
- 1981 Anthologie D'airs de la Cour (2LP only)
- 1982 Antonio Cesti Orontea 3LP
- 1982 Schütz Kleine Geistliche Konzerte
- 1982 Luca Marenzio, Madrigaux à 5 Et 6 Voix
- 1982 Harmonia Sacra Henry Purcell, Jeremiah Clarke, John Blow, William Croft, Pelham Humfrey 1982
- 1983 Monteverdi Addio Florida Bella
- 1983 Barbara Strozzi, Cantate (LP only)
- 1984: Lamento d'Arianna by Monteverdi
- 1984: Motets à voix seule et à 2 voix by Marc-Antoine Charpentier
- 1984: Leçons de Ténèbres by François Couperin
- 1985: Xerse by Francesco
- 1985 Schütz Libro Primo De Madrigali
- 1983 Pergolesi Stabat Mater by Pergolesi
- 1987: Duos et cantates by Carissimi (with Agnès Mellon)
- 1988 Giasone Cavalli 4LP
- 1990 Auferstehungs-Historie SWV 50 by Schütz
- 1990: Weihnachts-Historie SWV 435 by Heinrich Schütz
- 1990: Cantates Membra Jesu Nostri BuxWV 75 and Heut triumphieret Gottes Sohn BuxWV 43 by Dieterich Buxtehude
- 1990: L'incoronazione di Poppea by Monteverdi
- 1992: Il ritorno d'Ulisse in patria by Monteverdi
- 1996: Vespro della Beata Vergine by Monteverdi
- 1995: La Calisto by Francesco Cavalli (recorded at the Théâtre de la Monnaie in Brussels 1993)
- Monteverdi: Madrigali guerrieri ed amorosi The 8th Book of Madrigals Bernarda Fink, Maria Christina Kiehr, Antonio Abete, Victor Torres, et al. Concerto Vocale, René Jacobs
- Caspar Kittel Arias and Cantatas Op. 1 Bernarda Fink, Guido Balestracci, Jeremy Ovenden, Gerd Turk, Attilio Cremonesi, Amandine Beyer & Pablo Valetti Concerto Vocale, René Jacobs
