= Julian Wachner =

American classical composer (born 1969)

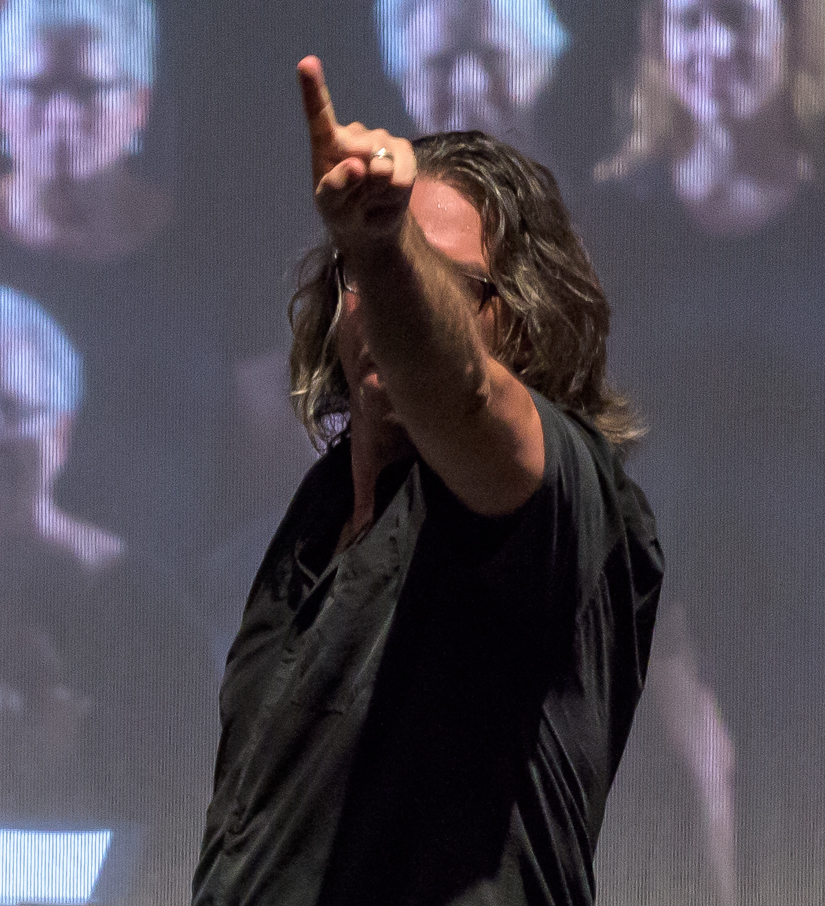
- Wachner in 2016 at the BRIC festival
- Born: Hollywood, California, U.S.
- Education: Boston University (BM, DMA)
- Occupations: Choral conductor, composer, math teacher
- Criminal charges: 10 counts of child sex abuse material and one count of possession of cocaine.
- Website: www.julianwachner.com

Julian James Wachner (born September 23, 1969) is an American choral conductor, composer, and keyboardist. From 2011 to 2022, he served as the Director of Music and the Arts at Trinity Wall Street, conducting the Choir of Trinity Wall Street, the Trinity Baroque Orchestra, and NOVUS NY. In 2020, Wachner was appointed Professor of Music and the Arts at the General Theological Seminary in Chelsea. His employment with Trinity Wall Street was terminated in 2022 due to unspecified objectionable conduct.

In August 2025, Wachner was arrested and charged with ten counts of possession of child sex abuse material and one count of cocaine possession, following an investigation that began after cryptocurrency transactions linked him to a dark web child sex abuse site. At the time of his arrest, Wachner was working as a fourth grade teacher at Invent Learning Hub, a charter school in Indianapolis. He was also the conductor for Foundation Concerto Vocale, an American baroque musical foundation. Following the charges, the Concerto Vocale Foundation terminated its relationship with Wachner. The German boys' choir Tölzer Knabenchor, with which Wachner had recently been associated, also publicly distanced itself from Wachner following his arrest and urged parents and choirboys to have no contact with him. On July 15, 2026, Wachner agreed "to plead guilty to five counts of possession of child sex abuse material and one count of possession of cocaine."

On September 9, 2026, in Indiana's Marion Superior Court, Wachner was "sentenced to nearly six years of probation" and "must also register as a sex offender".

On October 21, 2026, Wachner was indicted in the U.S. District Court for the Southern District of Indiana for receipt of child pornography and possession of material containing child pornography.

== Biography ==
Wachner was born in 1969 in Hollywood, California into a musical household. His mother, Mary Spire, is a pianist, and his former stepfather, Robert Cole, was a conductor. Wachner began cello and piano lessons at age 4 at the University of Southern California, and from age 9 to 13, Wachner studied composition in New York at the Saint Thomas Choir School under Gerre Hancock.

Wachner later attended the Boston University College of Fine Arts, where he studied with Lukas Foss, Theodore Antoniou, David Hoose, and Marjorie Merryman. While a student there, he was appointed the University Organist and Choirmaster at Marsh Chapel. He graduated in 1996 with a Doctorate of Musical Arts in composition and orchestral conducting and taught as an Assistant Professor of Sacred Music at BU's School of Theology. From 1999 to 2002, he directed the Young Artists Composition Program at the Tanglewood Institute.

During his tenure at BU, Wachner also headed multiple Boston-area arts institutions. In 1995, he and Peter Watchorn founded the Boston Bach Ensemble, a period instrument orchestra and choir. Their recording of Bach's Christmas Oratorio, released in 2001, helped launch Watchorn's Musica Omnia label in 1998. Wachner also served as Director of the Back Bay Chorale, releasing a CD of works by Benjamin Britten with the ensemble in 2001. From 1996 to 2006, he was Director of the Providence Singers in Providence, RI. In 1999 he conducted the premier performance of The Magdalene Passion, by composer Elaine Bearer, with the Providence Singers, an hour-long oratorio with five soloists, chorus, organ and chamber orchestra.

Wachner moved to Montreal in 2001 to become an associate professor at McGill University's Schulich School of Music, a post he held until 2011. As associate professor, Wachner served as the principal conductor of Opera McGill and occasionally conducted the McGill Symphony and Contemporary Music Ensemble. He also founded and directed the Schulich Singers, a chamber choir that performs repertoire spanning all musical periods. While in Montreal, Wachner served as Artistic Director of the Festival Bach Montréal for one edition and as Director of Music of the Presbyterian Church of St. Andrew and St. Paul.

In 2008, Wachner returned to the United States to direct the Washington Chorus. The Chorus released a CD of Christmas carols in 2010, featuring several arrangements by Wachner himself. Under Wachner's direction, the Chorus also performed with the Rolling Stones in the final concert of their "50 and Counting" tour in 2013.

Wachner was appointed Director of Music and the Arts at Trinity Wall Street in 2011, placing him at the podium of both the church's choir and baroque orchestra. In his first season there, he established NOVUS NY, a contemporary music ensemble. His 2012 recording of Handel's Israel in Egypt with the Trinity Choir and Trinity Baroque Orchestra was nominated for a 2013 Grammy Award for Best Choral Performance. Wachner recorded five albums with the ensembles of Trinity Wall Street, primarily for the Musica Omnia label. From 2008 to 2017, he served as the Director of The Washington Chorus. In March 2018, Wachner was named Artistic Director of the Grand Rapids Bach Festival, an affiliate of the Grand Rapids Symphony, in Grand Rapids, Michigan.

As a guest conductor, he has led ensembles including the Philadelphia Orchestra, Juilliard Opera, and San Francisco Opera, and has participated in festivals including the Spoleto Festival USA, Glimmerglass Festival, Lincoln Center Festival, BAM Next Wave Festival, and the New York Philharmonic Biennial. As a composer, he has published over 60 musical works (see below), many of which are sacred works for chorus. His complete choral works to date were released in two volumes by Naxos Records in 2010 and 2014. Wachner is the author, with Kevin J. Moroney and others, of Psalms for All People: An Inclusive-Language Resource for Praying and Singing. The book was immediately withdrawn by its publisher following Wachner's firing from his church and seminary positions.

In 2025, Concerto Vocale, an American foundation that produces historically informed performances of the works of J. S. Bach, appointed Wachner as a director. Following his 2025 arrest and charges, Concerto Vocale terminated this relationship.

== Controversies and legal issues ==
On February 28, 2022, Mary Poole, a former employee of the Juilliard School, publicly alleged that Wachner had "groped her and kissed her" during a 2014 music festival; she had hired Wachner for a directing job. Wachner has denied these allegations. Following these accusations, on March 1, 2022, Wachner was placed on leave by Trinity Wall Street. The foregoing details were published in The New York Times on March 13, 2022. The next day, Trinity fired Wachner, without having concluded its investigation of the 2014 allegations, because of "recent information that Julian has otherwise conducted himself in a manner that is inconsistent with our expectations of anyone who occupies a leadership position." On March 14, 2022, the General Theological Seminary removed all mentions of him from its website.

On March 18, 2022, Wachner posted his version of the 2014 incident at his website, denying that any nonconsensual activity had occurred. He later deleted the post. On December 22, 2022, Wachner sued the Juilliard School for defamation, arguing that the school had never investigated the allegation against him and made false statements about him. The case was dismissed with prejudice by the New York Supreme Court.

=== 2025 arrest and charges ===
On August 20, 2025, Wachner was booked into the Marion County Jail (Indianapolis, Indiana) on preliminary charges of child exploitation and child pornography. Two days later, he was charged with one count of possession of child pornography. Prosecutors later filed ten counts of possessing child sexual abuse material depicting children younger than 12 years old and one count of cocaine possession, following an investigation that began after cryptocurrency transactions linked him to a dark web child sex abuse site. A search of his laptop revealed a video of child sexual abuse displayed in full screen and other recently accessed files, with forensic analysis ongoing. Detectives reported that Wachner admitted to downloading and later deleting images obtained from the dark web over several years, involving reportedly hundreds of transactions. They also stated that he purchased material depicting minors between the ages of 1 and 16, with an emphasis on those between 6 and 13. Wachner later pleaded not guilty to the charges and was released on a $15,000 bond. A jury trial date had been set for October 20, 2025 and was moved to December 15, 2025 at Wachner's request. After another continuance was filed by Wachner, the trial was rescheduled for February 17, 2026 before the Honorable Jeffrey L. Marchal, presiding judge of Marion Superior Court, in Case Number 49D31-2508-F4-026083. Wachner was granted two more continuances, which rescheduled the trial date again to May 11, 2026, and then, most recently, to July 20, 2026. On July 15, 2026, Wachner signed a plea agreement with the state of Indiana, agreeing "to plead guilty to five counts of possession of child sex abuse material and one count of possession of cocaine.... [He] faces up to 10 years in prison." The jury trial for Wachner set for July 20, 2026 was cancelled after he pled guilty. On September 9, 2026, in Indiana's Marion Superior Court, Wachner was "sentenced to nearly six years of probation" and "must also register as a sex offender". "[T]he prosecution never recommended that the judge sentence Wachner to time in prison."

Prior to his arrest, Wachner had been working as a fourth-grade math teacher at a local charter school, Invent Learning Hub. The school released the following statement to NPR:

"Effective immediately, Julian Wachner is no longer an employee of Invent Learning Hub. We want to be transparent with our community: at no time were our employees or board members aware that Mr. Wachner was under investigation, nor did we have knowledge of the actions that led to this situation. As part of our standard hiring process, we conducted thorough background checks in accordance with our established policies. The safety and well-being of our students remain our highest priority."

Wachner's most recent musical activity had been with the American foundation Concerto Vocale. Following the arrest, Foundation Concerto Vocale suspended its relationship with Wachner. Wachner was also scheduled to conduct the Indianapolis Symphony Orchestra and Chorus in December 2025, but his name was removed from the orchestra's website.

=== 2026 federal indictment ===
On October 21, 2026, Wachner was indicted in the U.S. District Court for the Southern District of Indiana for receipt of child pornography and possession of material containing child pornography.

== Composition ==
=== Sacred music ===
Many of Wachner's earlier published works were liturgical in purpose, written during his tenure as University Organist and Choirmaster at Marsh Chapel in the early 1990s. He first came to public attention with Canticles (1991, revised 1994), a work for chorus and orchestra written as a response to the Gulf War and as a companion piece to Fauré's Requiem. Consisting of five movements, the work features settings of Biblical texts that bookend three poems by Shelli Jankowski-Smith about the atrocities of war .

These Biblical themes were later expanded upon in his first symphony, titled Incantations and Lamentations, which was commissioned and premiered by the Back Bay Chorale in 2001. Like Canticles, Incantations and Lamentations is a work in five movements for chorus and orchestra. In his program notes, theologian Wesley Wildman writes that the work concerns the "superficial opposition between worship and indictment of God ... and their breathtaking merger in the context of the Biblical story of the Babylonian exile." This analysis is echoed in Matthew Guerrieri's liner notes for the Naxos recording of the Symphony: "It undercuts the confidence of Psalm 103 ('I will praise the Lord as long as I live') with the despair and frustration of Psalm 137 ('by the waters of Babylon we sat down and wept')." Canticles and Symphony No. 1 were later recorded by the Trinity Wall Street Choir and NOVUS NY and included in Complete Choral Works, Vol. 2, released on Naxos in 2014.

=== Secular music ===
Outside of the realm of sacred music, Wachner has also composed secular song cycles, including Sometimes I Feel Alive (1998) and Rilke Songs (2001). The former, which Wachner composed at the Tanglewood Music Center while conducting the BUTI Young Artists Chorus, sets three erotic poems by E. E. Cummings: "there is a moon sole", "as is the sea marvelous" and "somewhere I have never travelled". The latter sets six poems about animals by Rainer Maria Rilke: "Die Gazelle", "Der Panther", "Die Flamingos", "Der Schwan", "Schwarze Katze" and "Das Einhorn". Both works were recorded by the Elora Festival Singers and included in Complete Choral Works, Vol. 1, released on Naxos in 2010.

While director of Opera McGill, Wachner premiered Evangeline Revisited, an opera in two acts based on Henry Wadsworth Longfellow's Evangeline. Written to commemorate the 250th anniversary of the 1755 Expulsion of the Acadians, the opera features a French libretto by Université de Montréal professor Alexis Nouss and blends multiple musical styles, including jazz, blues, Puccini-esque opera, fugue and cabaret. The role of Evangeline is split between two sopranos: one who represents Longfellow's vision, and one who serves as a contemporary commentator. The opera received its US premiere at New York City Opera's VOX Festival in 2010.

Come, My Dark-Eyed One, commissioned and premiered by the Back Bay Chorale in 2009, weaves together poems by John Clare, Emily Dickinson and Sara Teasdale in a libretto compiled by soprano Marie-Ève Munger. Originally a companion piece for Brahms's Ein Deutsches Requiem, the work charts the "life and death of two lovers" in eight movements.

In 2012, Wachner collaborated with visual artist Erika Harrsch to create a work for The River to River Festival. The resulting installation, titled Inverted Sky, featured a solo flute score with live electronic processing. This accompanied a collection of kites built from various world currencies that were released into the air in time with the music.

=== Style ===
Wachner has described himself "[a]s a composer-conductor perched between the Apollonian world of church music and the academy and the Dionysian world of opera and the stage." In the liner notes of his Complete Choral Works, Vol. 1, he writes of this duality:

For me, I always found this a difficult decision to make, and thus found myself living and working in the no-man’s land between pure post-Impressionism and post-Expressionism—composing music that was criticized as "too simple" from one camp and "too complex" from the other. As I have always considered my compositional process and philosophy to be aligned with the assimilators of previous eras, (Bach, Stravinsky and Foss come to mind)—I have found equal inspiration from strict form or unbridled chaos; tonality, modality or post-tonality; and lyricism, pointillism or minimalism—I find it crucial to have as sweeping a palette of creative possibilities at my disposal as possible, believing that this desire is no different from any composer of the past.

In 2014, Beth Morrison, an opera producer and longtime collaborator of Wachner's, says of his compositional style: "I see his work as very Americana, firmly following in the steps of Copland and Bernstein." His creative output has also been noted for its multifaceted nature, as in Guerrieri's liner notes: "Wachner's eclecticism is uncommonly deep, a reflection of his multivalent career: a virtuoso organist, an omnivorous conductor, an exploratory composer; a church musician with a dramatic sense of the sacred and a concert-hall veteran with a reverence for the dramatic."

== Awards ==
- 2011 — ASCAP Alice Parker Award for Adventurous Programming (with The Washington Chorus)
- 2013 — Nominated, Grammy Awards: Best Choral Performance (for Israel in Egypt with the Choir of Trinity Wall Street and Trinity Baroque Orchestra)

== Discography ==
This is a list of recordings by Julian Wachner, either as composer or conductor.

Year	Title	Composer	Conductor	Artist(s)	Label
2000	Julian Wachner: Chamber Music	Yes	Yes	Boston Sinfonietta	ARSIS Audio
2000	Julian Wachner: Sacred Music	Yes	Yes	Boston Bach Ensemble	ARSIS Audio
2001	J. S. Bach: Weihnachts-Oratorium	No	Yes	Boston Bach Ensemble / Rob Pitcher, evangelist / Anne Harley, soprano / Elizabeth Anker, alto / Thomas Gregg, tenor / Max van Egmond, baritone	Musica Omnia
2001	The Company of Heaven: Works by Benjamin Britten	No	Yes	The Back Bay Chorale and Chamber Orchestra / The Marsh Chapel Choir / Cathleen Ellis & Anne Harley, sopranos / William Hite, tenor / Peter Krasinski, organ / Phyllis Hoffman & Peter Watchorn, narrators	ARSIS Audio
2002	The Midnight Ride of Paul Revere	Yes	No	Charles Ansbacher, conductor / Moscow Symphony Orchestra / Sen. Edward Kennedy, narrator	Landmarks Recordings
2002	Somewhere I Have Never Traveled	Yes	No	David Hodgkins, conductor / Coro Allegro	Coro Allegro
2003	Lukas Foss: Griffelkin	No	No	Gil Rose, conductor / Boston Modern Orchestra Project / Julian Wachner, choral director	Chandos Records
2010	Christmas with the Washington Chorus	No	Yes	Washington Chorus / Whitman Choir / National Capital Brass and Percussion Ensemble	Dorian Recordings
2010	Julian Wachner: Complete Works for Chorus, Vol. 1	Yes	No	Noel Edison, conductor / Elora Festival Singers	Naxos
2011	J. S. Bach: Complete Motets	No	Yes	The Trinity Choir and Trinity Baroque Orchestra	Musica Omnia
2012	Handel: Israel in Egypt	No	Yes	Trinity Baroque Orchestra	Musica Omnia
2012	Elena Ruehr: Averno	No	Yes	The Trinity Choir with Novus NY / Marguerite Krull, soprano / Stephen Salters, baritone	Avie Records
2012	Julian Wachner: Triptych	Yes	Yes	Orchestre Métropolitain	ATMA Classique
2014	Julian Wachner: Symphony No. 1 / Incantations and Lamentations	Yes	Yes	Novus NY / The Choir of Trinity Wall Street / Majestic Brass Quintet / Jessica Muirhead, soprano / Chris Burchett, baritone	Musica Omnia / Naxos
2014	Ralf Yusuf Gawlick: Missa gentis humanae	No	Yes	Sarah Brailey and Linda Jones, sopranos / Luthien Brackett and Melissa Attebury, altos / Steven Caldicott and Timothy Hodges, tenors / Thomas McCargar and Jonathan Woody, basses	Musica Omnia
2015	Paola Prestini: Oceanic Verses	No	Yes	Helga Davis, vocals / Christopher Burchett, baritone / Hila Plitmann, soprano / Claudio Prima, vocals & accordion / The Choir of Trinity Wall Street / Decoda	VIA Records
