= Emil Hlobil =

Czech music educator and composer (1901–1987)

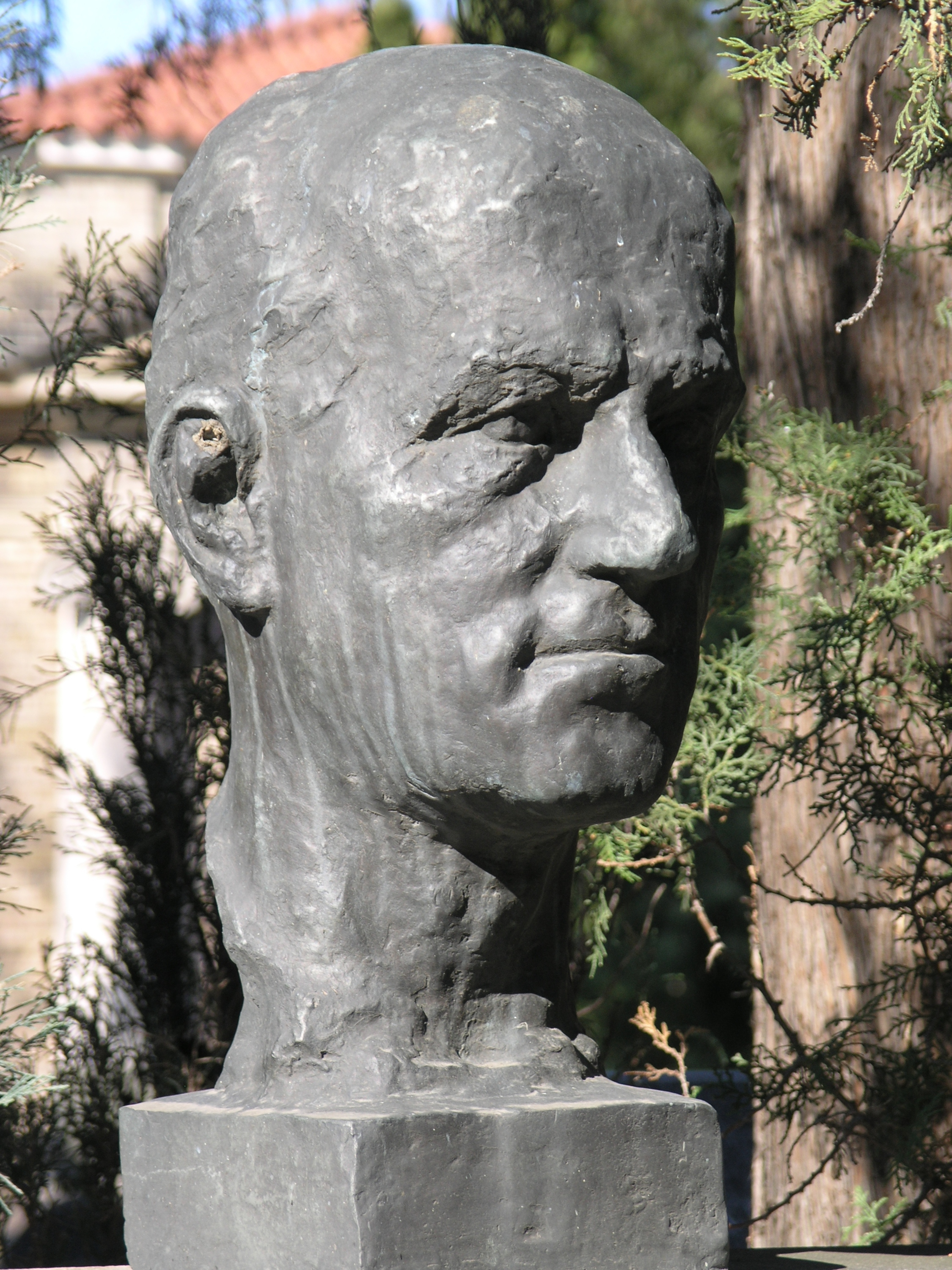
- Bust of Hlobil, Vyšehrad Cemetery
- Born: 11 October 1901; Veselí nad Lužnicí
- Died: 25 January 1987 (aged 85); Prague, Czech Republic
- Education: Prague Conservatory; Prague Academy of Performing Arts
- Occupations: Composer; Academic teacher

Emil Hlobil (11 October 1901 – 25 January 1987) was a Czech composer and Academic teacher based in Prague.

== Biography ==
Hlobil was born in Veselí nad Lužnicí, but lived most of his life in Prague. Between 1924 and 1930 he studied at the Prague Conservatory under Josef Suk and Jaroslav Křička, and taught music and composition at the Prague Academy of Performing Arts. He also taught at the Prague Conservatory (1941–1958) before moving to the Academy. He married Czech painter Marie-Hlobilová Mrkvičková, and after World War II they bought a cottage in the Krkonoše mountains as a summer home. Hlobil died in Prague in 1987.

== Music ==
Hlobil composed in the Romantic tradition of the Nineteenth Century, almost untouched by modern trends, which was possibly a reflection of the politics of the time and place. A review by Gramaphone in 1961 described him as follows:

Emil Hlobil, 60-year-old professor of composition at the Prague Conservatoire, has the most original creative imagination of our twelve composers, I would say. In his Quartet for harpsichord and string trio (1944) [sic], he uses a fairly simple diatonic idiom, but shows a Janáček-like boldness in his apparently inconsequential changing of the subject, his close working-out of a few motives, and his ability to create fascinating textures. Although his self-made technique is not nearly as successful as Janáček's—his material does not stand up to so much repetition, and he sometimes falls into empty naïveté (codetta of first movement and much of the finale), this refreshingly imaginative work makes one want to hear more recent examples from his long list of compositions.

Hlobil's works include operas, symphonies, concertos and string quartets in the Czech Impressionist tradition of Suk and Vítězslav Novák.

== Selected works ==
=== Stage ===
- Anna Karenina, Opera in 3 acts, Op. 60 (1962); libretto by the composer after a dramatization of Tolstoy's novel by Nicolai Volkov
- Měšťák šlechticem (Le Bourgeois Gentilhomme), Opera in 3 acts, Op. 67 (1967); libretto by the composer after the play by Molière
- Kráska a zvíře (Beauty and the Beast), Ballet in 3 acts, Op. 96 (1976); libretto by Milan Fridrich after František Hrubín
- Král Václav IV. (King Wenceslaus IV), Opera in 5 scenes, Op. 107 (1981); libretto by the composer after the play by Arnošt Dvořák

=== Orchestral ===
- Suite, Op. 4
- Weekend, Suite, Op. 6
- Sinfonietta, Op. 19
- Zpěv mládí (Song of Youth), Op. 22
- Tryzna mučedníkům, Op. 25
- Park oddechu, Suite for small orchestra, Op. 28
- Lidová veselice (Folk Celebration), Suite for small orchestra, Op. 32
- Symphony No. 1, Op. 31 (1949)
- Léto v Krkonoších (Summer in the Krkonoše Mountains), Op. 33 (1957)
- Symphony No. 2 "Den vítězství" (Victory Day), Op. 38 (1951)
- Valašskou dědinou (Moravian Wallachia Village), Suite, Op. 39
- Serenade, Op. 49
- Slavnostní znělka (1954); written for the 1954 World Ice Hockey Championships in Stockholm
- Symphony No. 3, Op. 53 (1956–1957)
- Symphony No. 4, Op. 58 (1959)
- Svátek práce (Labor Day), Symphonic Poem, Op. 59 (1960)
- Concerto for string orchestra, Op. 62
- Sonata No. 1 for chamber string orchestra, Op. 68
- Filharmonický koncert, Op. 66 (1965)
- Symphony No. 5, Op. 76
- Symphony No. 6 for chamber string orchestra (1972)
- Symphony No. 7, Op. 87 (1973)
- Cesta živých (Chemin des Vivants), Op. 92 (1974)
- Jubilace (Jubilation; Giubilazione), Symphonic Movement, Op. 100 (1977)
- Exclamationes
- Invocazione
- Jaro v pražských zahradách (Spring in the Prague Gardens), Suite
- Slovanská družba, March

=== Concertante ===
- Concerto for violin and orchestra, Op. 47 (published 1958)
- Rhapsodie for clarinet and orchestra, Op. 51 (1960)
- Concerto for accordion and orchestra, Op. 54
- Concerto for organ and orchestra, Op. 61 (1963)
- Concerto for double bass and orchestra, Op. 70 (1967)
- Contemplazione for viola and string orchestra, Op. 75 (1969)
- Concerto for winds and percussion, Op. 82 (1972)
- Concerto for marimba and orchestra (1979)
- Concerto for cello and orchestra, Op. 106 (1983)

=== Chamber music ===
- Quintet for 2 violins, 2 violas and cello, Op. 1 (1925)
- 5 Invence (5 Inventions) for 2 violins (1935)
- Dvě nokturna (2 Nocturnes) for cello and piano, Op. 9 (1935)
- Serenade for violin and piano, Op. 12a (1935–1936)
- Burleska for violin and piano, Op. 12b (1935–1936)
- Sonatina for violin and piano, Op. 13 (1936)
- String Quartet No. 2, Op. 15 (1935–1936)
- Piano Trio, Op. 18 (1939)
- Quintet for flute, oboe, clarinet, bassoon and horn, Op. 20
- Sonata for horn and piano, Op. 21 (1942)
- Quartet for harpsichord, violin, viola and cello, Op. 23 (1943)
- Jarní impromptu (Spring Impromptu; Impromptu di primavera) for cello and piano, Op. 24 (1944)
- Andante amabile for oboe (or violin) and piano (1947)
- Andante pastorale for horn and piano (1947)
- Allegro leggiero for oboe (or violin) and piano, Op. 26b (1950)
- Nonet for flute, oboe, clarinet, bassoon, horn, violin, viola, cello and double bass, Op. 27 (1946)
- Divertimento for bassoon and piano, Op. 29 (1948)
- Arie a rondo (Aria and Rondo) for horn and piano, Op. 37 (published 1969)
- Canto emozionante for trombone and piano, Op. 43 (1967)
- String Quartet No. 3, Op. 50 (1955)
- String Quartet No. 4
- Octet for 2 oboes, 2 clarinets, 2 bassoons and 2 horns, Op. 52 (1956)
- Tři skladby (3 Pieces) for violin and piano, Op. 56 (1958)
- Sonata for violin and piano, Op. 57 (1958–1959)
- Intermezzo for trumpet and piano (published 1965)
- Sonata for flute and piano (1966)
- Sonata for trumpet and piano, Op. 71 (1967)
- Aria e rondo for oboe and harp (1968)
- Intermezzo for 2 accordions (published 1969)
- Sonata for bass clarinet and piano, Op. 80
- String Quartet No. 5, Op. 81 (1971)
- Sonata for 2 cellos, Op. 88 (1973)
- Sonata for trombone and piano, Op. 86 (1973)
- Tři monology (3 Monologues) for clarinet solo, Op. 90 (1973)
- Sonata for oboe and piano, Op. 91 (1974)
- Quartet for 4 saxophones, Op. 93 (1973)
- Sonáta vzpomínek (Souvenir Sonata; Sonata di evocazioni) for flute, guitar and cello, Op. 95 (1975)
- Canto pensieroso for tenor saxophone and piano, Op. 97 (1976)
- Trio for violin, guitar and accordion, Op. 98 (1976)
- Trio for clarinet, marimba and piano, Op. 98b (1976, 1983)
- Sonata for clarinet and piano, Op. 103 (1978)
- Marcato di Danza for 4 saxophones (1978)
- Dva monology (2 Monologues) for violin solo
- Komorní hudba (Chamber Music) for 2 clarinets, basset horn and bass clarinet
- Quartet for winds
- Trio for oboe, clarinet and bassoon

=== Organ ===
- Preludium a toccata (Prelude and Toccata) (1948)
- Aria e Toccata, Op. 46 (1964)
- Invokace (Invocation; Invocazione) (1957)
- Apoteosa, Op. 89 (1973)

=== Piano ===
- Dvě skladby (3 Pieces), Op. 2 (published 1932)
- Sonata for 2 pianos, Op. 55 (1958)
- Sonata No. 1 for piano, Op. 72 (1968)
- Sonata No. 2 for piano, Op. 73 (1968)
- Imaginace (Imagination) for piano 4-hands, Op. 101 (1977)
- Introdukce
- Pět skladeb (5 Pieces)
- Tanec (Dance)

=== Vocal ===
- Tři písně (3 Songs) for voice and piano, Op. 8 (1933)
- Cesta živých (Chemin des Vivants), 4 Songs for medium voice and piano, Op. 83
- Evocazioni for soprano, flute and alto flute (1968)

=== Choral ===
- Panachida, Apotheosis for mixed voices a cappella (1971)

== Notable students ==
- Milan Kymlička
- Luboš Fišer
- Ladislav Kubík
- Otomar Kvěch
- Ivana Loudová
- Zuzana Růžičková
- Viktor Kalabis
- Jindřich Feld
- Jan Hammer
