= Watchorn =

Watchorn is a surname. Notable people with the surname include:

- Dan Watchorn, guitarist of Canadian rock band Priestess
- Patsy Watchorn (born 1944), Irish folk singer
- Peter Watchorn (born 1957), Australian-born harpsichordist
- Tara Watchorn (born 1990), Canadian female ice hockey player
