= Frederick May (academic) =

Australian professor of Italian (1921–1976)

- Born: 3 August 1921; Kensington, London, UK
- Died: 11 January 1976 (aged 54); Roseville, New South Wales, Australia
- Occupation: Academic
- Writing career
- Notable works: Modern Italian Poetry; The Hughes-Foscolo Translation: from Petrarch; Prose Passages for Translation into Italian; The Rest is Silence; Three Major Symbols in Four Plays by Pirandello

Frederick May (1921–1976) was the foundation professor of Italian at the University of Sydney.

== Early life and education ==
May was born in the suburb of Kensington in London, England, on 3 August 1921. His parents were John May, a labourer, and his wife, Elizabeth Ann (née Owens).

He attended the Quintin School in St John's Wood, North London and then, from 1940, the University of London, from which he would graduate in 1947.

In 1940 he married Heather Constance Armstrong, a typist. In the early years of World War II May and his wife, who were both conscientious objectors, performed voluntary work with the Quakers's War Relief Service in Devon. From 1943 he worked as a hospital porter in Cambridge and a hospital theatre orderly in London.

== Leeds University ==
May's first teaching post was at the London School of Economics. In 1949 May was appointed as lecturer and then as senior lecturer and head of department in the Department of Italian at the University of Leeds. He built up the department and encouraged his students to perform in the plays of Italian dramatists. He translated many Italian plays into English and promoted the work of the Italian playwright Luigi Pirandello with a "crusading zeal".

== University of Sydney ==
In 1964 May was appointed as the inaugural professor of Italian at the University of Sydney. There he developed a curriculum which was "extraordinarily broad and demanding, encompassing literature, philology and drama from the thirteenth century to the neoavanguardia". During his early years in Sydney it was reported that May had had work published on "Foscolo, Pirandello, Machiavelli, and D. H. Lawrence" and that he was working on "a critical and biographical study of Pirandello".

With "his horn-rimmed spectacles, broken tooth, beard, lank hair, string bag and apple", May stood out as a great eccentric on campus. Christine McNeil recalled: "'He never stays on topic,' wailed the note takers, as he soared off on a thousand tangents in his soft, sweet voice. 'Of course you all remember where Milton says...', he might begin, to our class of youthful ignoramuses. 'Read for 14 hours a day and marry young to get that side of things out of the way, he told us.'" His lectures were so popular that "students from all faculties would come to hear him lecture in mellifluous tones on Italian literature—and indeed on any subject that crossed his fertile mind".

He regarded the examination system as "ridiculous" and let his students take books into the exam room or "told them the questions in advance". Students who disapproved of these examination rules were invited by him to "invent a suitably testing question for yourself and answer it well". The examination papers he set were long (from 40 to 60 pages in length) and elaborate, featuring cartoons, extracts from ancient drama, the press and poems, and "drawings of buxom ladies in the Norman Lindsay tradition".

== Final years ==
By 1969 May was suffering from failing health and began to involve himself in more activities outside the university, including contributing to the 1973 Heresies radio series on the Australian Broadcasting Commission, creating (together with Winsome Evans) a "collation of medieval poetry and music" with the title The Snave May Snitter Full Snart, and reading poetry with The Renaissance Players in the Great Hall of the University of Sydney.

He died in Roseville, New South Wales on 11 January 1976.

== Frederick May Foundation for Italian Studies ==
The Frederick May Foundation for Italian Studies was established in his memory.

== Legacy ==
May wrote extensively on "the textual bibliography of Ugo Foscolo and on Pirandello". His interpretative essays "emphasising a fusion in Pirandello's work of ancient myth and modern psychology" have influenced subsequent criticism, which previously had been mostly descriptive. His translations and productions of Pirandello's dramas contributed to a great interest in them in the second half of the twentieth century.

Another of May's enduring interests was in the Italian avant-garde, "both the 'historical' avant-garde" (Pirandello; Italian Futurists) and the neoavanguardia (English, "neo-avant-garde") of the 1960s (such as the Gruppo '63).

May translated more than fifty plays from the Italian, including dramas by Niccolò Machiavelli, Goldoni and A. Luongo.

Both on and off campus May advocated the cases for personal freedom and against censorship. He pronounced: "education is something that no-one should ever fail at".

== Personal life ==
May and his wife Heather had four sons. He also had fifth son by Fiona Garrood.

== Select bibliography ==
=== Translations of Luigi Pirandello ===
- A Dream of Christmas... Translated by Frederick May, Leeds: The Pirandello Society, 1959.
- The Rules of the Game; The Life I Gave You; Lazarus, Introduced and Edited by S. Martin Browne (and) Translated by Robert Rietty and Frederick May, Harmondsworth, Middlesex: Penguin Books, 1959 (Penguin Plays series).
- The Rules of the Game; Right You Are! (If You Think So); Henry IV, Introduced and Edited by S. Martin Browne (and) Translated by Robert Rietty and Frederick May, Harmondsworth, Middlesex: Penguin Books, 1969 (Penguin Plays series).
- Short Stories, Selected and Translated by Frederick May, with an Introduction and Bibliography by Felicity Firth, London: Oxford University Press, 1975.
- Six Characters in Search of an Author, Translated and with an Introduction by Frederick May, London: William Heinemann Ltd., 1954 (The Drama Library); London: Heinemann Educational Books, 1978 (The Drama Library); London: Heinemann Educational Books, 1980 (Heinemann Plays series).
- Short Stories, Selected and Translated with an Introduction by Frederick May, London: Quartet Books Ltd., 1987 (Quartet Encounters series).

=== Translations of other authors ===
- The J.C. Translations of Poems by Ugo Foscolo, Leeds: The Pirandello Society, 1963.
- The Hughes-Foscolo Translation from Petrarch, Florence, Italy: Edizioni Sansoni Antiquariato, 1963 (Biblioteca degli eruditi e dei bibliofili. Scritti di bibliografia e di erudizione raccolti da Marino Parenti : LXXXIV).
- Modern Italian Poetry: Selections with English Parallel. With an Introduction and Code by F. May... Reprinted from Poetry Australia, etc., Five Dock, New South Wales: South Head Press, 1970.

=== Criticism, etc. ===
- The Rest is Silence: A Dramatisation of the Short Story "Sgombero", Leeds: Pirandello Society, 1958; 2nd edition: 1960.
- Prose Passages for Translation into Italian, Leeds: The Pirandello Society, 1964. Joint author: Judy Rawson.
- Three Major Symbols in Four Plays by Pirandello, Lawrence, Kansas: Allen Press, 1974.
