= Alastair McAllister =

Australian harpsichord builder (born 1942)

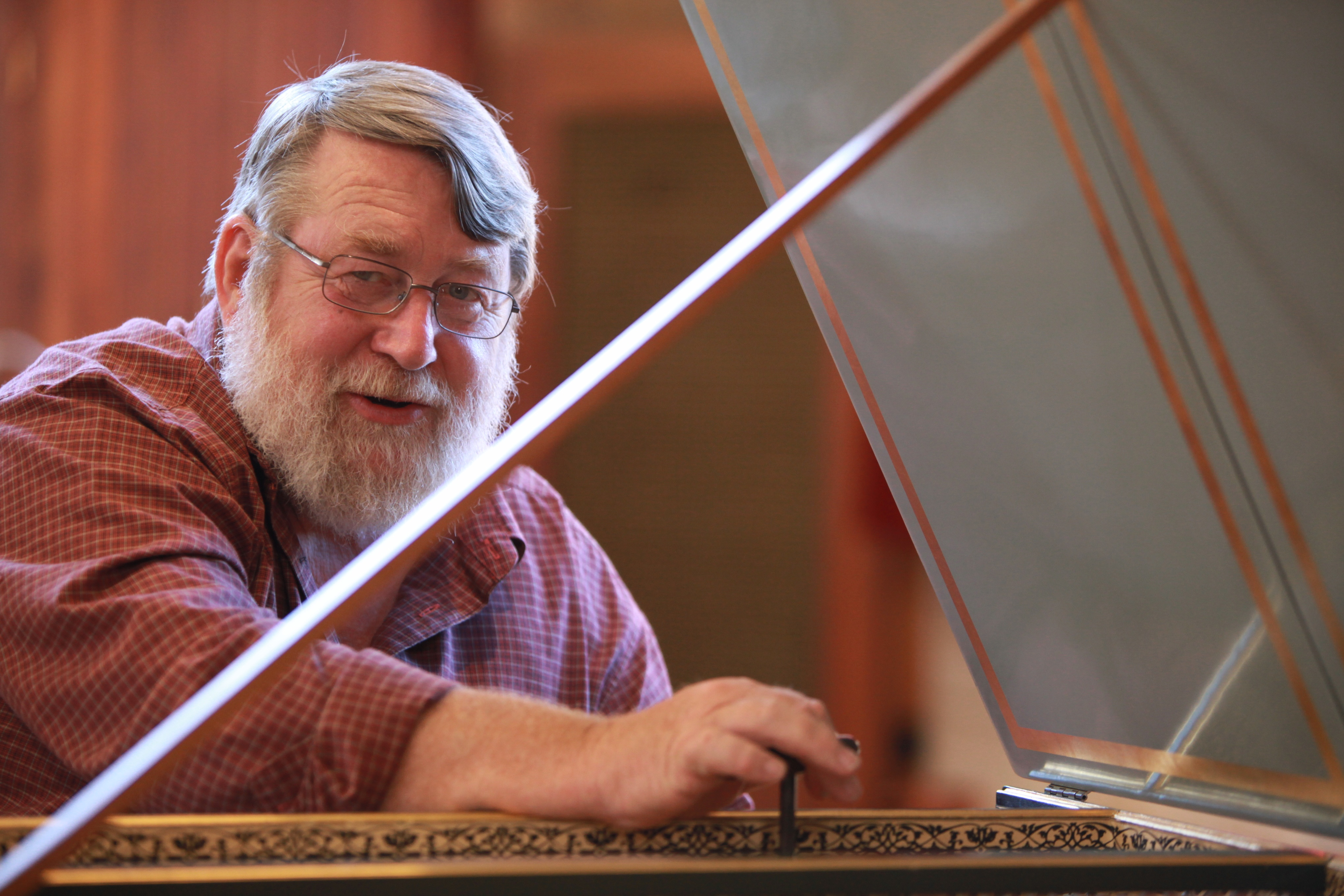
Alastair McAllister at work

Alastair McAllister (born Mildura, 3 August 1942) is an Australian harpsichord builder known for his historical integrity, design and workmanship, and for producing modern copies of instruments that closely match their prototypes in sound and touch. At the age of 15, he became inspired by the Baroque after hearing the music of Domenico Scarlatti. Working closely with his colleague, Mars McMillan, he founded Harpsichord Makers of Melbourne in 1967, in the inner-Melbourne suburb of Clifton Hill, and by the early 1970s he had become a full-time harpsichord builder. McAllister and his colleagues have created instruments patterned after the work of Henri Hemsch, Burkhardt Schudi, Johannes Daniel Dulcken, the Ruckers family, Christian Zell and Johann Heinrich Harrass, among others, and he has trained or influenced Australian builders such as Marc Nobel, Andrew Bernard, Alan Todd, Jean-Louis Cocquillat, and Richard Schaumloeffel.

McAllister has worked closely with the firm of Zuckermann Harpsichords International (Stonington, Connecticut, US), and with Hubbard Harpsichords, including a month-long residency in 1989 at the firm's headquarters in Waltham, Massachusetts. Since September 1986, he has carried out his craft from a studio within the Community Work Society Co-operative Ltd, alongside a group of heritage artisans in the Melbourne suburb of Preston. McAllister has worked closely with leading Australian and New Zealand harpsichordists as well as performers from Europe and the North America. These include Gustav Leonhardt, Ton Koopman, Bob van Asperen, Anthony Jennings, Peter Watchorn, Christopher Hogwood, Roger Heagney, Christiane Jaccotet, Colin Tilney, Davitt Moroney, and Bart van Oort. Since 1990, McAllister has served as the keyboard consultant to the Australian Brandenburg Orchestra, and has built a two-manual French instrument for its artistic director, Paul Dyer. McAllister harpsichords are owned by such ensembles as The Sydney Consort, and harpsichordists Peter Watchorn, Paul Dyer, Elizabeth Anderson, and Roger Heagney.

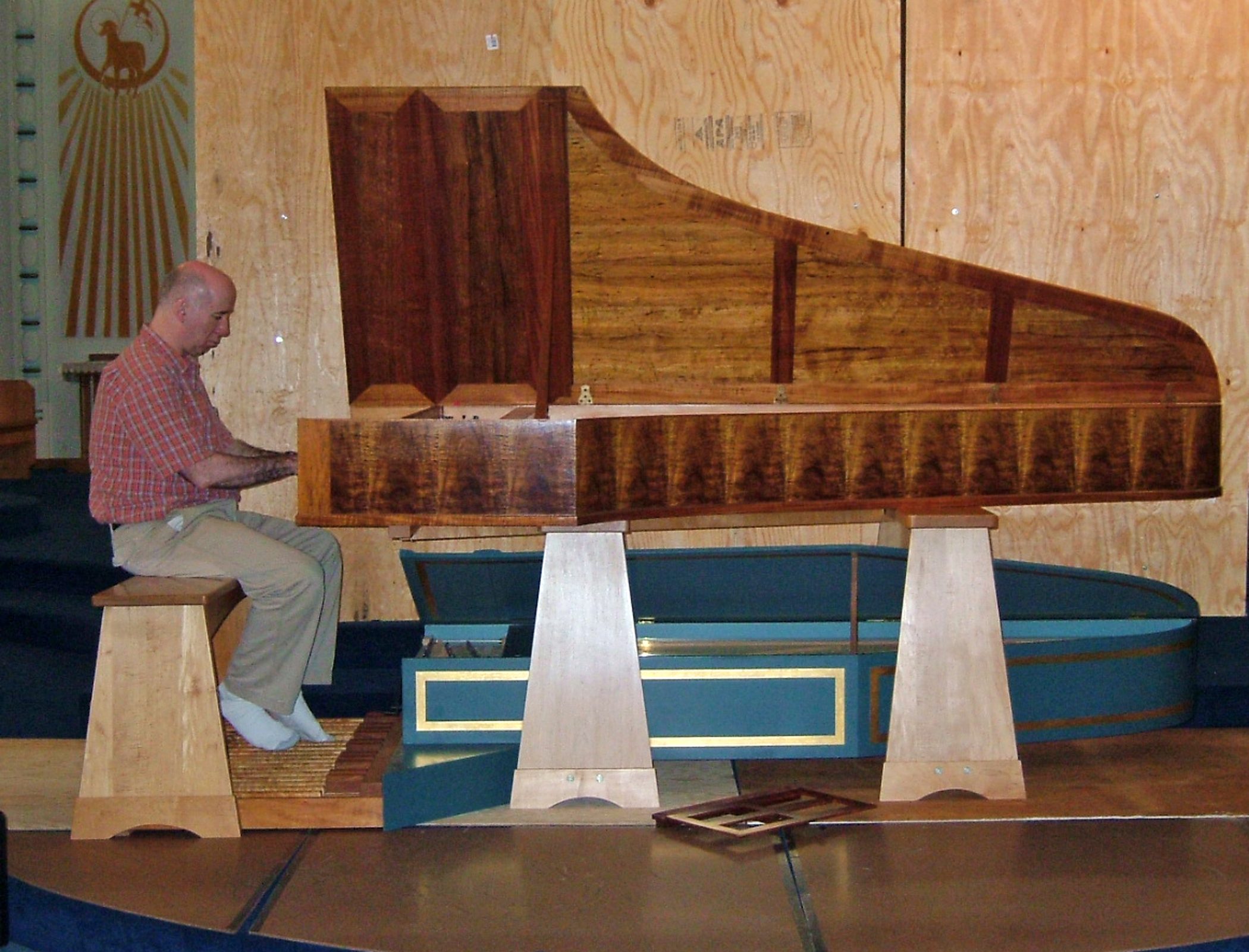
A McAllister harpsichord, combined here with a pedal harpsichord (blue case) by Hubbard & Broekman

McAllister has been at the forefront of harpsichord research and, with Andrew Bernard, proposed a unified theory of harpsichord scaling and geometry that accounts for the diverse pitches for which harpsichords were designed, linking this information to surviving string gauges and tuning forks. He was the first to demonstrate that stringing the early 20th century Pleyel harpsichord with classical wire and installing quill or delrin plectra yields a significant improvement in quality. In collaboration with Peter Watchorn, McAllister researched the surviving instruments by Hans Moermans "The Younger" of Antwerp, resulting in the creation of the first modern copies of his surviving 1642 double; one of these copies by McAllister is now owned by the Melbourne Recital Centre in the Southbank precinct.

In 2012, McAllister published three books; with Talking Harpsichords sharing his ruminations on a harpsichord-making career.

== Books ==
- Talking Harpsichords (2012)
- Snippets about John Bull (2012)
- Sonnets and Sundries (2012)
