= Musica Omnia =

US record label

- Founded: 2000
- Founder: Peter Watchorn
- Distributor(s): Naxos Records
- Genre: Classical music
- Country of origin: U.S.
- Location: Cambridge, Massachusetts
- Official website: www.musicaomnia.org

Musica Omnia is an American record label specializing in classical music. The label was founded in 2000 by Peter Watchorn, and through 2007, most issues were produced by him.

Although specializing in early music, the label has also released compositions by such contemporary composers as Julian Wachner.

Big Daddy Records was the initial distributor but the label switched to distribution by Naxos Records in 2014. The label's initial goal was to provide liner notes of superior educational value.
