= Mars McMillan =

Australian harpsichord maker and visual artist

Mars McMillan (November 6, 1944 – October 11, 2016) was an Australian harpsichord maker and visual artist.

== Early life and education ==
Mars McMillan was born in Sydney to parents Barrie McMillan and Prudence Kimpton McMillan. A year later, the family moved to Melbourne where she would live throughout her life. She was educated at St Catherine's School, leaving in 1961. Her obituary notes that while she was still at school, "Mars had become entranced with the sound of the harpsichord she heard on a recording and on leaving school immediately took steps to start building her own instrument.

== Career ==
By the age of 22, after teaching herself the necessary woodwork skills, she had built two instruments, having thrown away two earlier trials." A collaborator of Alastair McAllister, the two worked together under the business name "Harpsichord Makers of Melbourne," later called the "Clifton Hill School." The Clifton Hill School was well known in Australia for the fine craftspeople who were developing "an international reputation for Australian-made early instruments.

Historically, women have been underrepresented in the histories of musical instrument making. Thus, it is noteworthy that she was the only woman included in Wolfgang Zuckermann's 1969 book The Modern Harpsichord: Twentieth-Century Instruments and Their Makers. In addition to making musical instruments, she was an artist who painted some of her instruments' soundboards with Australian flora and fauna. Opera Queensland notes that the "extraordinary output of Mars McMillan fed into the creation of Melbourne’s Festival of Organ and Harpsichord, the only festival in the world for early music repertoire that celebrates the harpsichord."

== Death and legacy ==
McMillan died on October 11, 2016.

In 2017, Winsome Evans donated a harpsichord made by McMillan to Sancta Sabina College in Sydney.
