= Renaissance Players =

The Renaissance Players
- Origin: Sydney, New South Wales, Australia
- Years active: 1967–2014

The Renaissance Players were an Australian early music ensemble directed by Winsome Evans. Their album Mirror of Light received a nomination for the 1997 ARIA Award for Best Classical Album.

== Discography ==
- Memories Of English Minstrelsy (1976) – Viking
- Adam's Apple (1977) – Cherry Pie
- The Captive Unicorn (2LP) (1978) – Cherry Pie
- The Sibyl's Giggle (1979) – Cherry Pie
- The Cat's Fiddlestick (1981) – Cherry Pie
- The Muses' Gift (Dances I) (1993) – Walsingham Classics
- Venus' Fire (Dances II) (1994) – Walsingham Classics
- The Ring Of Creation (Dances III) (1994) – Walsingham Classics
- Garland Dances (Dances IV) (1995) – Walsingham Classics
- Songs For A Wise King (Cantigas I) (1996) – Walsingham Classics
- Maria Morning Star (Cantigas II) (1996) – Walsingham Classics
- Mirror of Light (Cantigas III) (1996) – Walsingham Classics
- Thorns Of Fire (The Sephardic Experience I) (1998) – Celestial Harmonies
- Apples & Honey (The Sephardic Experience II) (1998) – Celestial Harmonies
- Gazelle & Flea (The Sephardic Experience III) (1999) – Celestial Harmonies
- Eggplants (The Sephardic Experience IV) (1999) – Celestial Harmonies
- Testament (Archangels' Banquet/Shepherds' Delight) (2CD) (2000) – Celestial Harmonies
- Of Numbers And Miracles – Selected Cantigas de Santa Maria (2001) – Celestial Harmonies
- Adam's Apple (Limited CD reissue) (2006) – Cherry Pie
- The Sibyl's Giggle (Limited CD reissue) (2006) – Cherry Pie
- Pilgrimage to Montserrat (2CD) (2014) – Tall Poppies
- Memories Of English Minstrelsy (Expanded Limited CD reissue with bonus archive material) (2014)
- Pillar of Wisdom (Cantigas IV) (2014) – Tall Poppies
- Gabriel’s Message (Cantigas V) (2014) – Tall Poppies

== Awards and nominations ==
=== ARIA Music Awards ===
The ARIA Music Awards is an annual awards ceremony that recognises excellence, innovation, and achievement across all genres of Australian music. They commenced in 1987.

| Year | Nominee / work | Award | Result | Ref. |
|---|---|---|---|---|
| 1997 | Mirror of Light | Best Classical Album | Nominated | |

== See also ==
- Frederick May
