= Mahan Esfahani =

Mahan Esfahani ماهان اصفهانی
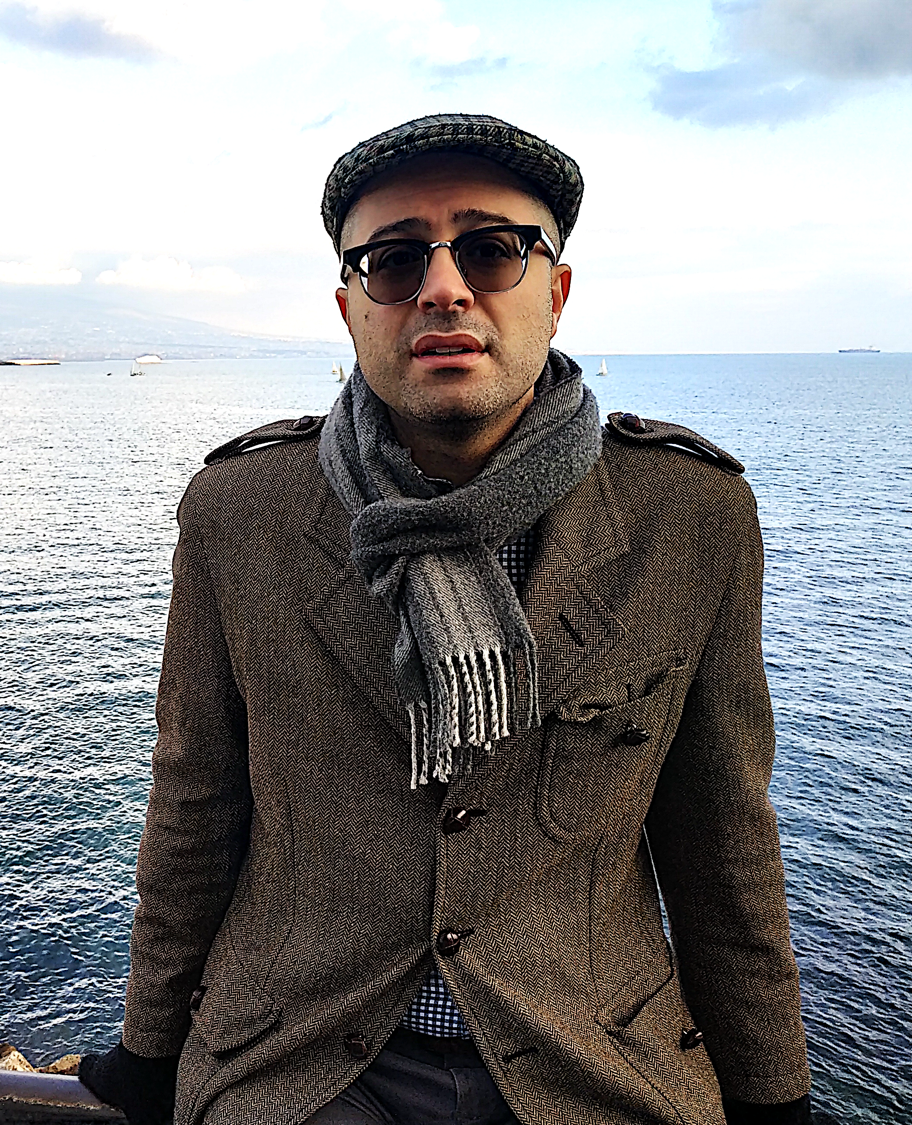

Background information
- Born: 1984 (age 41–42); Tehran, Iran
- Origin: Iranian
- Genres: Classical music
- Occupation: Professional musician
- Website: www.mahanesfahani.com

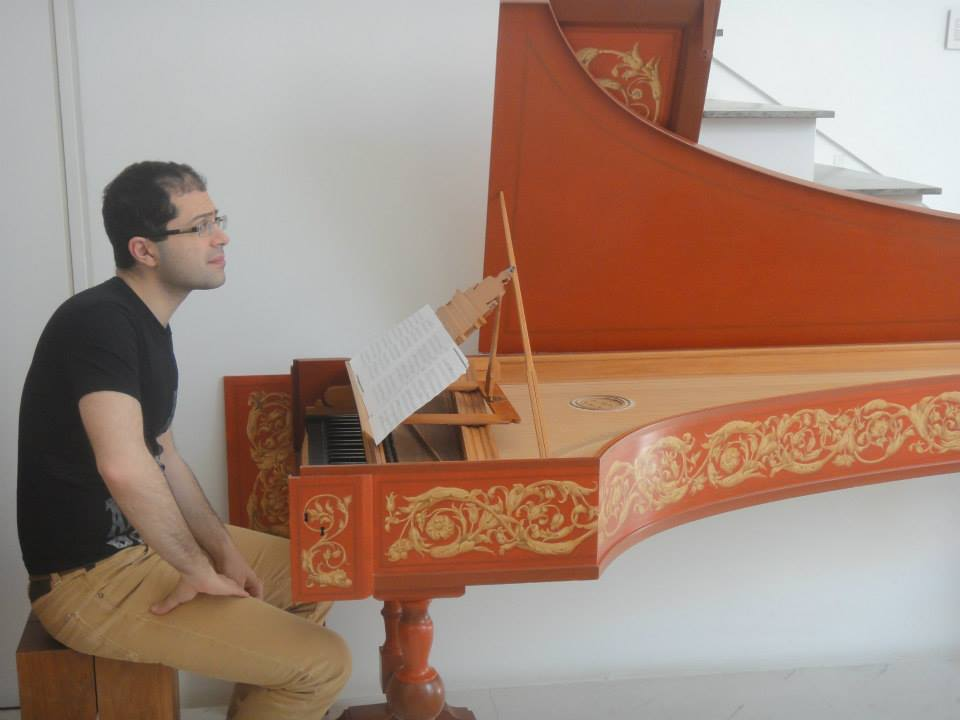
Mahan Esfahani - Pharos Chamber Music Festival 2014

Mahan Esfahani (Persian: ماهان اصفهانی) (born 1984 in Tehran) is an Iranian-American harpsichordist.

== Education ==
Esfahani received his first guidance on the piano from his father before exploring an interest in the harpsichord as a teenager.

He studied musicology and history at Stanford University, where he took his first harpsichord lessons with Elaine Thornburgh and was mentored by George Houle. He continued his harpsichord studies in Boston with Peter Watchorn, before completing his studies under Czech harpsichordist Zuzana Růžičková.

== Career ==
As a leading harpsichordist, Esfahani's programming and work in commissioning new compositions has drawn the attention of critics and audiences across Europe, Asia, and North America. He was the first harpsichordist to be a BBC Radio 3 New Generation Artist (2008–2010), and to be honoured by an award from the Borletti-Buitoni Trust (2009). He has also been a nominee for Gramophone Classical Music Awards Artist of the Year (2014, 2015, and 2017).

His work for the harpsichord has resulted in recitals in major concert halls and events including the Wigmore Hall and Queen Elizabeth Hall in London; the Konzerthaus Berlin; the Edinburgh International Festival; Oji Hall, Tokyo; the Forbidden City Concert Hall, Beijing; Lincoln Center's Mostly Mozart Festival, New York; the Al Bustan Festival, Beirut; and the Jerusalem Arts Festival.

He has had concerto appearances with the Chicago Symphony Orchestra, BBC Symphony Orchestra, Royal Liverpool Philharmonic, Melbourne Symphony, Auckland Philharmonia, Symfonický orchestr Českého rozhlasu, Orquesta de Navarra, Malta Philharmonic Orchestra, Aarhus Symphony Orchestra, Hamburg Symphony, Munich Chamber Orchestra, and Britten Sinfonia. He is an artistic partner for 2016–2019 with the Los Angeles Chamber Orchestra, and has played as part of the Manchester Collective.

Performances include his Carnegie Hall debut in spring of 2018, recitals at the Amsterdam Concertgebouw and Thüringer Bachwochen with violinist Liza Ferschtman, concertos with the Kammerakademie Potsdam, and the continuation of a multi-year project of the complete keyboard works of J.S. Bach for Wigmore Hall, with whom he has enjoyed an association since he made his debut there.

Following three years as artist-in-residence at New College, Oxford, he continues his academic associations as an honorary member at Keble College, Oxford, where he serves as patron of the Keble Early Music Festival. Esfahani also became professor of harpsichord at The Guildhall School of Music & Drama in the spring of 2015. He can be frequently heard as a commentator on BBC Radio 3 and BBC Radio 4 and as a host for such programmes as Record Review, Building a Library, and Sunday Feature. For the last programme he is currently at work on his third radio documentary following two programmes on such subjects as the history of African-American composers in the classical sphere.

In August 2025 Esfahani was the guest on the BBC Radio 3 programme The Lebrecht Interview.

== Detailed awards and performances ==
Esfahani made his Wigmore Hall debut in 2009 as a concerto soloist with The English Concert. Later in 2009, he made his debut at The Proms in 3 concerts that featured New Generation Artists. In July 2011, Esfahani gave the first solo harpsichord recital in the history of The Proms, at Cadogan Hall. He returned to The Proms in July 2012, leading the Academy of Ancient Music in his own arrangement of J.S. Bach's The Art of Fugue. Outside of the UK, his New York debut was at the Frick Collection in March 2012.

Esfahani recorded Carl Philipp Emanuel Bach's Württemberg Sonatas for Hyperion Records, and the recording won a 2014 Gramophone Award in the Baroque Instrumental category. The same recording won him the BBC Music Magazine Award's 'Best Newcomer' award the following year. 2014 also saw Hyperion release his two-disc set of the complete harpsichord works of Jean-Philippe Rameau. In 2014, Esfahani signed a recording contract with Deutsche Grammophon (DG), and his first DG recording, 'Time Present and Time Past', was released in 2015.

During a 2016 performance of Steve Reich's Piano Phase at the Kölner Philharmonie, some audience members booed, clapped, whistled and shouted 'speak German'. When different factions in the audience yelled each other down, Esfahani stopped the performance and Concerto Köln and instead played a concerto by C. P. E. Bach. Some members of the audience apologised for the incident after the concert.

On February 11, 2021, Mahan's collaborative album with Danish recorder player Michala Petri and German viola da gamba player Hille Perl, "Bach: 6 Flute Sonatas," won the Danish Music Award P2 Prize for Best Classical Album.

== Personal life ==
Born in Tehran in 1984 and raised in the United States, he lived in Milan and then London for several years before taking up residence in Prague. He is gay and Presbyterian. He became a naturalized Czech citizen in 2023.

== Discography ==
=== Solo albums ===
- "Mahan Esfahani: Byrd, Bach, Ligeti" (2014), Wigmore Hall Live
- "C.P.E. Bach: Württemberg Sonatas" (2014), Hyperion
- "Rameau: Pièces de clavecin" (2014), Hyperion
- "Time Present and Time Past" (2015), Deutsche Grammophon
- "J.S. Bach: Goldberg Variations" (2016), Deutsche Grammophon
- "The Passinge Mesures: Music of the English Virginalists" (2018), Hyperion
- "J.S. Bach: The Toccatas" (2019), Hyperion
- "Musique?" (2020), Hyperion
- "J.S. Bach: Six Partitas" (March 2020), Hyperion
- "J.S. Bach: Italian Concerto & French Overture (Clavier-Übung II)" (September 2022), Hyperion
- "Concertos by Bohuslav Martinů, Viktor Kalabis, Hans Krása/ with Prague Radio Symphony Orchestra, dir. Alexander Liebreich" (February 2023), Hyperion
- "J.S. Bach: Notebooks for Anna Magdalena" (May 2023), Hyperion
- "J.S. Bach: The French Suites" (October 2023), Hyperion
- "J.S. Bach: Preludes, Inventions & Sinfonias" (September 2024), Hyperion
- "J.S. Bach: The Well-Tempered Clavier, Book 1" (September 2025), Hyperion

=== Collaborations ===
- "Sacred And Secular Music From Renaissance Germany" (2006), Naxos - with Ciaramella Ensemble
- "Bull: Complete Keyboard Music, Vol. 1" (2009), Musica Omnia - Peter Watchorn and Mahan Esfahani
- "Arcangelo Corelli. La Follia, Six Sonatas opus 5" (2014), OUR Recordings - with Michala Petri
- "Ukdk:Contemporary Recorder" (2015), OUR Recordings - with Michala Petri
- "Bach: 6 Flute Sonatas" (2019), OUR Recordings - with Michala Petri and Hille Perl
- "Corellimania: Corelli, Bach, Händel, Telemann" (2023), OUR Recordings - with Michala Petri and Hille Perl

== See also ==
- Classical music
- Music of Iran
- List of Iranian musicians
