= Zuzana Růžičková =

Czech harpsichordist and pianist

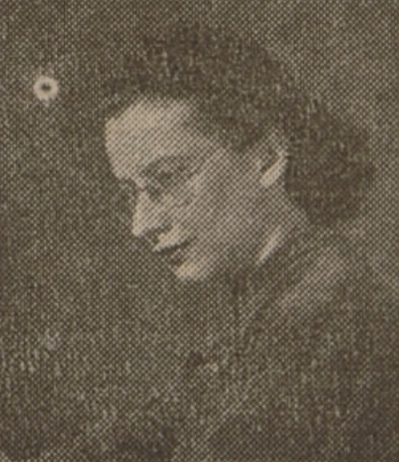
- Zuzana Růžičková in 1956

Background information
- Born: 14 January 1927; Plzeň, Czechoslovakia
- Died: 27 September 2017 (aged 90) Prague, Czech Republic
- Occupations: Harpsichordist, academic
- Instrument: Harpsichord
- Years active: 1950-2006

Zuzana Růžičková (Czech pronunciation: [ˈzuzana ˈruːʒɪtʃkovaː]; 14 January 1927 – 27 September 2017) was a Czech harpsichordist. An interpreter of classical and baroque music, Růžičková was the first harpsichordist to record Johann Sebastian Bach's complete works for keyboard, in recordings made in the 1960s and 1970s for Erato Records.

Růžičková was born to a Jewish family in Plzeň, Czechoslovakia. As a teenager during World War II, she was imprisoned in the Nazi concentration camps of Terezín, Auschwitz, and Bergen-Belsen. She returned to Plzeň after the end of the war.

Růžičková was the wife of Czech composer Viktor Kalabis. The couple refused to join the Czechoslovak Communist Party which held power from 1948 to 1989, and faced political persecution as a result. Růžičková performed across the world for 50 years, recorded over 100 records, and taught prominent musicians including Christopher Hogwood, Ketil Haugsand, Jaroslav Tůma, and Mahan Esfahani.

== Early years ==
Růžičková was born in Plzeň in 1927. Her family owned a department store, and her father had spent four years in Chicago in the 1920s, working at the Ginsburg Department store. Although he had experienced success in the United States, her father returned to Czechoslovakia. Růžičková learned English from her father. Růžičková characterized her childhood as "very sweet" and her parents as "very much in love". According to Růžičková, her family was historically Jewish. Her mother was an Orthodox Jew, but her father was an atheist. Růžičková described herself as not particularly religious.

Růžičková began taking piano lessons after suffering from pneumonia aged nine, as a reward for her recovery. Her piano teacher, Marie Provazníková, introduced her to the works of Bach and encouraged her to take up the harpsichord. Impressed by Růžičková's talent, Provazníková wrote to French-Polish musician Wanda Landowska, asking her to accept Růžičková as a pupil at her École de Musique Ancienne in the Paris suburb of Saint-Leu-la-Forêt once she had finished her obligatory schooling at 15. In the end, Růžičková was not able to attend due to the Nazi invasion of Czechoslovakia in 1938, and the implementation of the Nuremberg Laws.

== Nazi occupation of Czechoslovakia and World War II ==
In 1941, the Gestapo began organizing transports to move Jews from Plzeň to Terezín. The camp's first inmates, known as the Aufbaukommando, were tasked with converting the fortress and surrounding walled town into a concentration camp, known as Theresienstadt.

In Plzeň, 13-year-old Růžičková was among Jewish children used by the Gestapo to deliver "invitations" to members of the town's Jewish community, informing them of the date they would be deported to the camp, which Růžičková later described as seeing "life at its very worst. It was a nightmare". In January 1942, three weeks after receiving notice from the Gestapo, Růžičková and her family were forcibly relocated from Plzen to Theresienstadt by train. Upon arrival, Růžičková met Fredy Hirsch, a 25-year-old German Jew, who assumed the responsibility of caring for the camp's children by arranging activities and exercise for them, and reserving two barracks for what were called Children's Homes.

=== Internment in Theresienstadt ===
Theresienstadt was originally designated by the Nazis as a "model community" for educated, middle-class Jews from Germany, Czechoslovakia, and Austria. Růžičková, along with other children at the camp, did agricultural work, applying manure to fields and working in vegetable gardens, and was therefore able to sneak food from the gardens to her family. Although forced to work during the day, Růžičková was able to continue her education at Theresienstadt, and could attend concerts and lectures staged by the residents after work. She was able to see opera singer Karel Berman perform, take Latin lessons from a former university professor and harmony lessons from pianist Gideon Klein, and join a children's choir.

Růžičková's father and grandfather died in the camp. Her father died in Spring 1943, but Růžičková was able to remain with her mother. In December 1943, the two were sent to Auschwitz after nearly two years in the camp. She was given the option to remain in Theresienstadt, but chose to go with her mother. Before her transport to Auschwitz, Růžičková transcribed a Bach piece onto paper to bring with her to the camp.

=== Internment in Auschwitz ===
After three days on the transport, Růžičková and her mother arrived in Auschwitz by night, and those on the transport were immediately placed in barracks, many suffering from hunger and dehydration. The next day, she and the other prisoners were taken to another barracks, stripped, and tattooed. They were then forced to sign a document stating that they had been arrested in Theresienstadt for anti-German activities, and accepted their sentence.

Soon after her arrival, Růžičková was reunited with Hirsch, who advised her to lie about her age and say she was sixteen, rather than fifteen. Růžičková later credited Hirsch with her survival, as if she had not lied about her age it is likely that she would have been gassed. Hirsch was organising the children's barracks as he had in Theresienstadt, and Růžičková began working there as a teaching assistant, which kept her from more dangerous jobs and protected her from the many diseases spreading through the camp. In this role, she was exposed to the extreme reality of Nazi racial theory; German doctors, including Fritz Klein, the "Chief Selector" of the camp and colleague of Josef Mengele, whom Růžičková had met in Theresienstadt, visited the children's barracks to take physiological measurements or select children to be removed for experimentation.

In May 1944, Růžičková and the other inmates who had traveled with her from Terezin to Auschwitz were scheduled to be gassed. However, their execution was slated for June 6—D-Day. After going through another selection process, Růžičková and her mother were instead sent to Germany.

=== Slave labor in Hamburg ===
Růžičková was sent to Hamburg, which was being bombed regularly by the British and Americans. Under the auspices of the Neuengamme concentration camp, laborers were assigned to work in sub-camps in the area around Hamburg. Růžičková was put to work protecting and repairing an oil pipeline and maintaining gas tanks, which were subject to daily bombardment. She was able to remain with her mother, but suffered greatly from hunger and dangerous working conditions. However, she was able to earn some extra food from other prisoners by singing for them. In addition to working on the oil pipeline, she worked in the shipyards of Hamburg. In January 1945, Růžičková was moved to the Tiefstack sub-camp, where she worked in a cement factory. As Allied forces advanced, the prisoners were made to dig booby-traps for tanks.

=== Internment in Bergen-Belsen ===
At the end of February, Růžičková and the other laborers were transported to Bergen-Belsen concentration camp. She later commented that "if ever there was Hell, this was the lowest part of Hell. This was an extermination camp—it was really meant for us to die in." At this point, Bergen-Belsen was disorganized, overcrowded, and stricken with disease. When her mother fell ill, Růžičková was forced to sneak out of the camp to gather turnips in order to survive. In April 1945 Růžičková and the other prisoners who could still walk were ordered to march from the camp to a railway station two miles away. They returned to the camp and woke the next morning to discover the Germans had gone. The guards had abandoned the camp, leaving no food, and had disconnected the water supply. A few German and Hungarian troops remained outside the camp, randomly shooting into the barracks on occasion. On 15 April 1945 British and Canadian soldiers arrived at Bergen-Belsen.

=== Liberation and aftermath of WWII ===
Růžičková, along with many prisoners suffering from starvation, became seriously ill after eating the food rations provided by soldiers. At the time of liberation, she weighed only 70 pounds. She was taken to a hospital and treated for ulcers, typhus, malnutrition, and eventually diagnosed with malaria. Since she spoke English and several other languages, Růžičková worked as a translator for the medical staff as she recovered.

Although Růžičková's mother remained seriously ill, they were able to return to Czechoslovakia in July 1945, where they found their family home occupied and possessions stolen. One of the first people Růžičková met upon her return to Plzeň was her former piano teacher, Marie Provazníková. Růžičková later said that when Provazníková saw the conditions of her hands after four years in concentration camps, she wept.

The four years Růžičková had spent in concentration camps had not only hurt her physically and psychologically, but also caused a significant delay in her progress as a musician. To be accepted into a music school, Růžičková had to pass a series of examinations. She started in classes with children to regain her fundamental skills, and managed to advance every few months, from a third grade level to the required eight grade level. Růžičková began studying piano again with Bohdan Gsölhofer in Plzeň.

== Post-war career ==
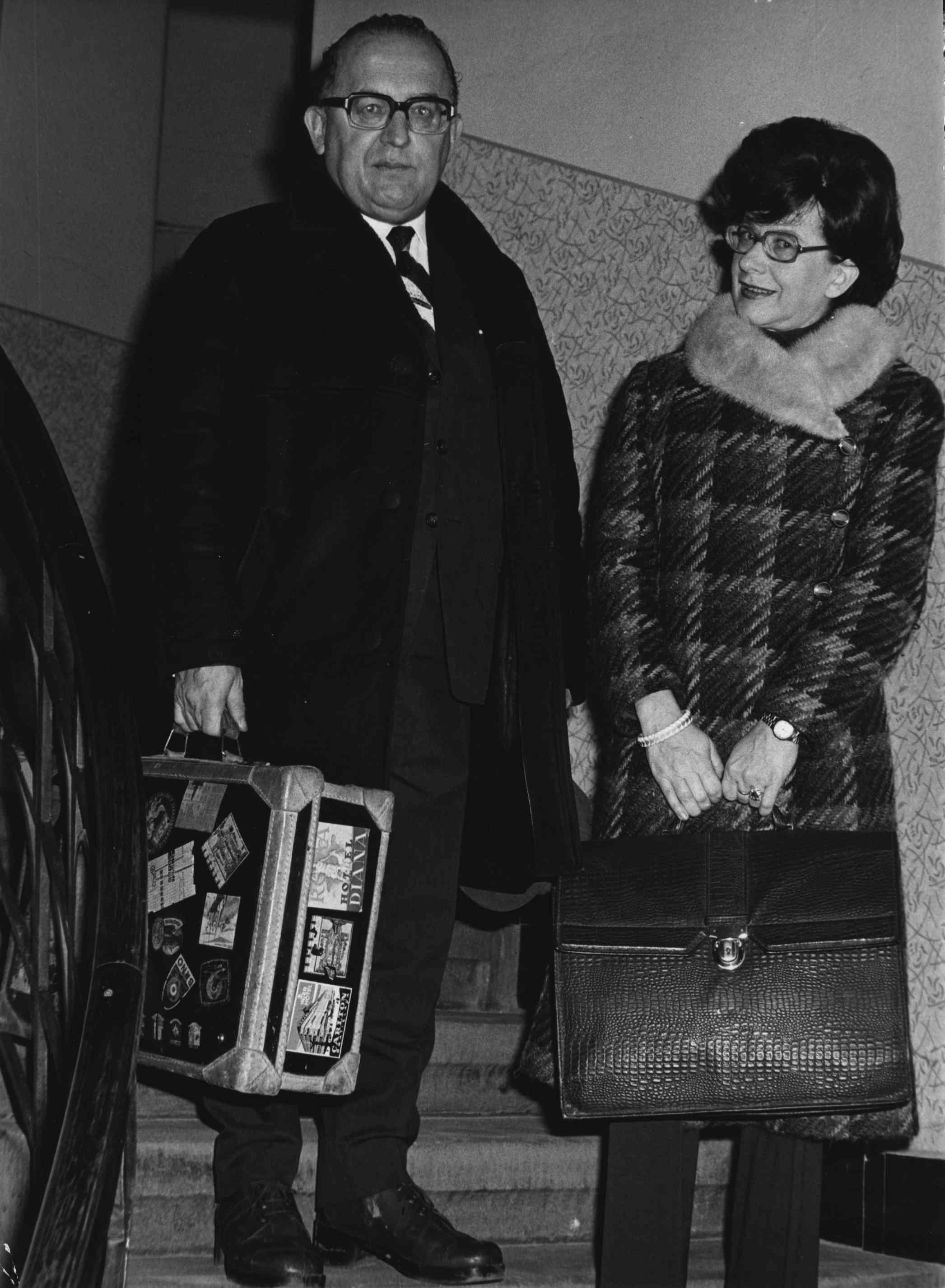
Růžičková with her husband Viktor Kalabis, left, in 1976, in Prague

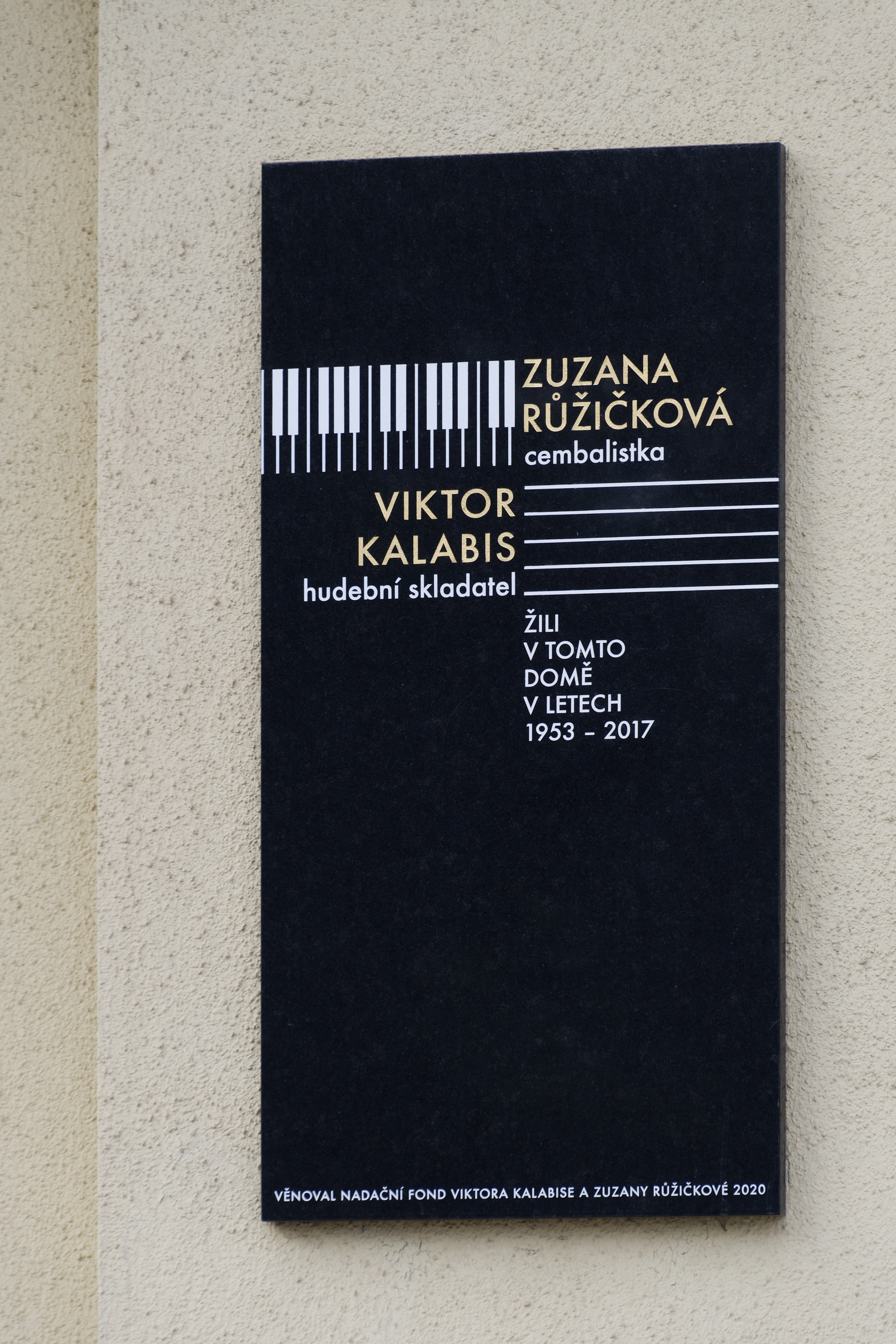
Memorial plaque of Zuzana Růžičková and Viktor Kalabis, Prague 3, Slezská 107, The Czech Republic

In 1947, Růžičková was accepted into the Academy of Performing Arts in Prague where her professors included pianists Albín Šíma, František Rauch and harpsichordist Oldřich Kredba. Despite her rapid improvement, one of her professors discouraged her from being a professional musician, but she continued her studies, specializing in the harpsichord and early music. She completed a BA and went on to complete an MA.

After the 1948 coup by the Communist Party of Czechoslovakia (KSČ), Růžičková was pressured to join the Communist Youth Movement, but refused. As a student in Prague, Růžičková was called in front of a committee when she was discovered reading the works of Sigmund Freud, whose literature had been banned. In 1950, Růžičková secured a position at the Academy, teaching composers to play the piano. One of her students was her future husband, Czech composer Viktor Kalabis. She gave her first harpsichord recital in 1951. As a faculty member at the Academy of Performing Arts, Růžičková was subject to performance reviews that evaluated her both professionally and politically.

As a Jew, Růžičková was still vulnerable to persecution under the Communist government. In the context of high-profile anti-Semitic political events such as the Slánský show trials of 1952, Růžičková tried to persuade Viktor Kalabis not to marry her, but they married in December 1952.

In 1956 Růžičková won the ARD International Music Competition in Munich, and was offered a scholarship from jury member Marguerite Roesgen-Champion to continue her harpsichord studies in Paris. Kalabis was also invited to study in Paris, but the couple was not allowed to travel abroad together in case they defected. Kalabis went to Paris, but Růžičková remained in Czechoslovakia. Although she was unable to study in Paris, her win at the International Music Competition led to further invitations to perform across Europe. Since she was highly paid for these performances, the government allowed her to travel, but confiscated much of the foreign currency that she earned.

She performed at Bach festivals in various European cities, including Leipzig, and many beyond the East Bloc: Stuttgart, Heidelberg, Ansbach, Frankfurt, Schaffhausen, and Bath. Although her success made her valuable to the state, as a non-party member Růžičková remained under suspicion from the Communist government, and was not allowed to teach music to Czech students. Furthermore, her participation in the Czech Philharmonic was restricted due to her Jewish heritage.

The pressures on Růžičková were eased slightly following the death of Joseph Stalin and the relaxation of his policies. She was able to travel more freely, and occasionally with her husband. However, Růžičková did not try to defect, as she and Kalabis still had family members living in Czechoslovakia. For the first time, Růžičková was able to record music for international distribution, increasing her fame and strengthening her association with the music of Bach. This coincided with the revival of Baroque music in Western Europe.

In 1962, she co-founded the Prague Chamber Soloists with conductor Václav Neumann, and in 1963 she formed a successful duo with violinist Josef Suk. Other chamber music partners included János Starker, Pierre Fournier, Jean-Pierre Rampal, Aurèle Nicolet and Maxence Larrieu. She also worked with conductors including Serge Baudo, Paul Sacher, Herbert Blomstedt, Libor Pešek, Neville Marriner and Helmuth Rilling. Her recorded repertoire is extensive, including works from the English virginalists through to modern composers such as Bohuslav Martinů, Francis Poulenc, Manuel de Falla and Frank Martin.

The music of Bach, however, always remained central to her career, and in 1965 Růžičková was contracted by the French label Erato Records to record the complete keyboard works of Bach. She completed the task in 1975, becoming the first person to record them in their entirety.

Following the Prague Spring of 1968, the Czech government was under pressure to appear stable and progressive. Růžičková was given several state-sponsored rewards, which served as propaganda for the regime. Růžičková was unable to refuse these rewards and was often forced to accept them with great ceremony. She was a soloist with the Czech Philharmonic from 1979–1990.

== After the Velvet Revolution ==
Following the Velvet Revolution of 17 November 1989, Růžičková participated in the protests against the government, going on strike from the Academy of Music and the Czech Philharmonic. When the Communist regime was overthrown in December, Růžičková received the title of "Professor", which she had not been granted despite teaching at the Academy since 1951, and was able to serve as a committee member for music competitions. She also established a harpsichord class at the Music Academy in Bratislava, where she had been guest professor from 1978–1982. For twenty-five years she gave master classes in Zürich, as well as other classes in Stuttgart, Kraków, Budapest, Riga, and Tokyo.

She stopped performing publicly in 2004 after Kalabis fell ill. Following Kalabis' death in 2006, Růžičková became more involved in various musical organizations and committees dedicated to the interpretation and preservation of early music, and to the discovery of young musicians. She was the president of the Viktor Kalabis & Zuzana Růžičková Fund, vice-president of the Prague Spring International Music Festival Committee, and a member of the advisory boards of the Czech Chamber Music Society and the Concertino Praga International Competition. She was a supporter of the Hans Krása Initiative, dedicated to the life and music of composer and fellow Theresienstadt prisoner Hans Krása, who was murdered in the Holocaust. She was also active in the Terezín Initiative, through which she was able to fund a memorial for Fredy Hirsch.

== Later years and legacy ==
Růžičková was married to Viktor Kalabis for 54 years, and inspired him to compose several major works for harpsichord: Six Two-Part Canonic Inventions (1962), Aquarelles (1979), Preludio, Aria e Toccata (1992), and Concerto for Harpsichord and Strings (1975). Contemporary composers have also dedicated works to her, including Jan Rychlík's Hommagi clavicembalistici (1964), and she premiered works by Emil Hlobil, Hans-Georg Görner and Elizabeth Maconchy. Růžičková was also an influential teacher. Among her students were the late British harpsichordist and conductor Christopher Hogwood and the Iranian-American harpsichordist Mahan Esfahani.

In 2013 Supraphon released new CDs of Růžičková's work, and British harpsichordist Pamela Nash wrote about her in the June 2013 edition of the British Sounding Board magazine:

Acclaimed as 'The first lady of the harpsichord,' and recognized by many as Landowska's successor, her career has left the harpsichord world a legacy, documented by over 100 recordings, spanning half a century... this timely commemoration serves as a timely reminder of Ruzickova's invaluable role in promoting the harpsichord in the 20th century. She made enormous strides to establish the instrument as a solo and ensemble concert instrument, and there can be no doubt that the status of the harpsichord today owes much to her pioneering efforts. Embarking on a career when early harpsichord repertoire was barely acknowledged, or else relegated to the piano, she resolved to re-connect Baroque keyboard music to the instrument for which it was written; in her own words 'to rid the harpsichord of its museum nature and make it a living instrument.'"

In October 2016, her entire recordings of all of J.S Bach's keyboard works in remastered form were released by Warner Records/Erato. Supraphon has reissued several CDs of collections of Růžičková's earlier recordings.

Růžičková appeared in a 2017 documentary film about her life and music, Zuzana: Music is Life, directed by Peter Getzels and Harriet Gordon Getzels. Until her death Růžičková resided in Prague. In December 2016, a month before her 90th birthday, she revealed she had been diagnosed with cancer and had undergone chemotherapy.

In 2019, her posthumous autobiography, One Hundred Miracles, written with Wendy Holden, was published by Bloomsbury, and translated into ten languages.

== Partial list of awards and recognitions ==
=== Titles ===
- Artist of Merit, 1968 (CZ)
- Nation Artist, 1989 (CZ)
- Professor of the Academy of Music in Prague, 1990 (CZ)
- Chevalier des Arts et des Lettres, 2004 (Fr)

=== Medals ===
- Medaille für Kunst und Wissenschaft der Freistadt Hamburg (1993)
- Medal of Contribution to "Golden Funds of Supraphone" (1997)
- Medal of Harmony Musical Review (2001)
- Prize for Contribution to Czech and World Music (2001)
- Medal of Merit 2 Grade for Arts and Culture of the President of the Czech Republic (2003)
- Aachen "Kulturpreis Karl IV" (2011)
- Grenade Star of BOHEMIAN HERITAGE FUND, endowment fund (2013)

=== Prizes ===
- Státní cena Klementa Gottwalda [Klement Gottwald State Prize], 1971
- Grand Prix Cros (J.A. Benda, J.S. Bach)
- Diapason d’Or (Henry Purcell)
- Golden Disc Supraphone (300,000 LPs, CDs, and tapes sold)

=== Honours ===
- Hon. Member: Direktorium "Neue Bachgesellschaft" Leipzig
- NEMA (National Early Music Association of Great Britain)
- The Dvořák Society for Czech and Slovak Music
- Honorary Citizen of the town Jindřichův Hradec (CZ)
- Honorary Citizen of the Prague 3 district (CZ)

== Documentary ==
- "Zuzana: Music is Life", directed by Peter Getzels, 2019.
