= Viktor Kalabis =

Czech composer (1923–2006)

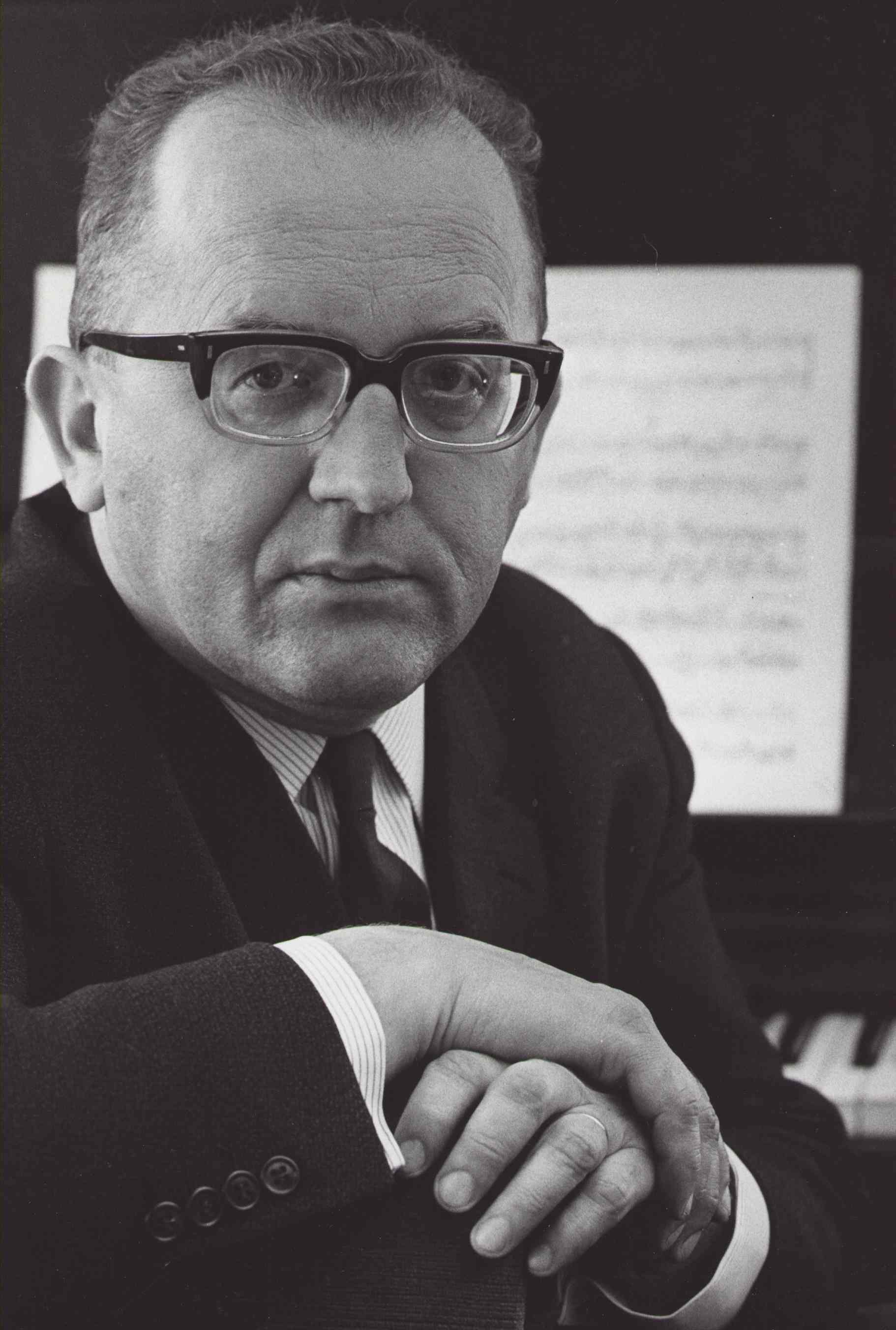
Viktor Kalabis in 1968

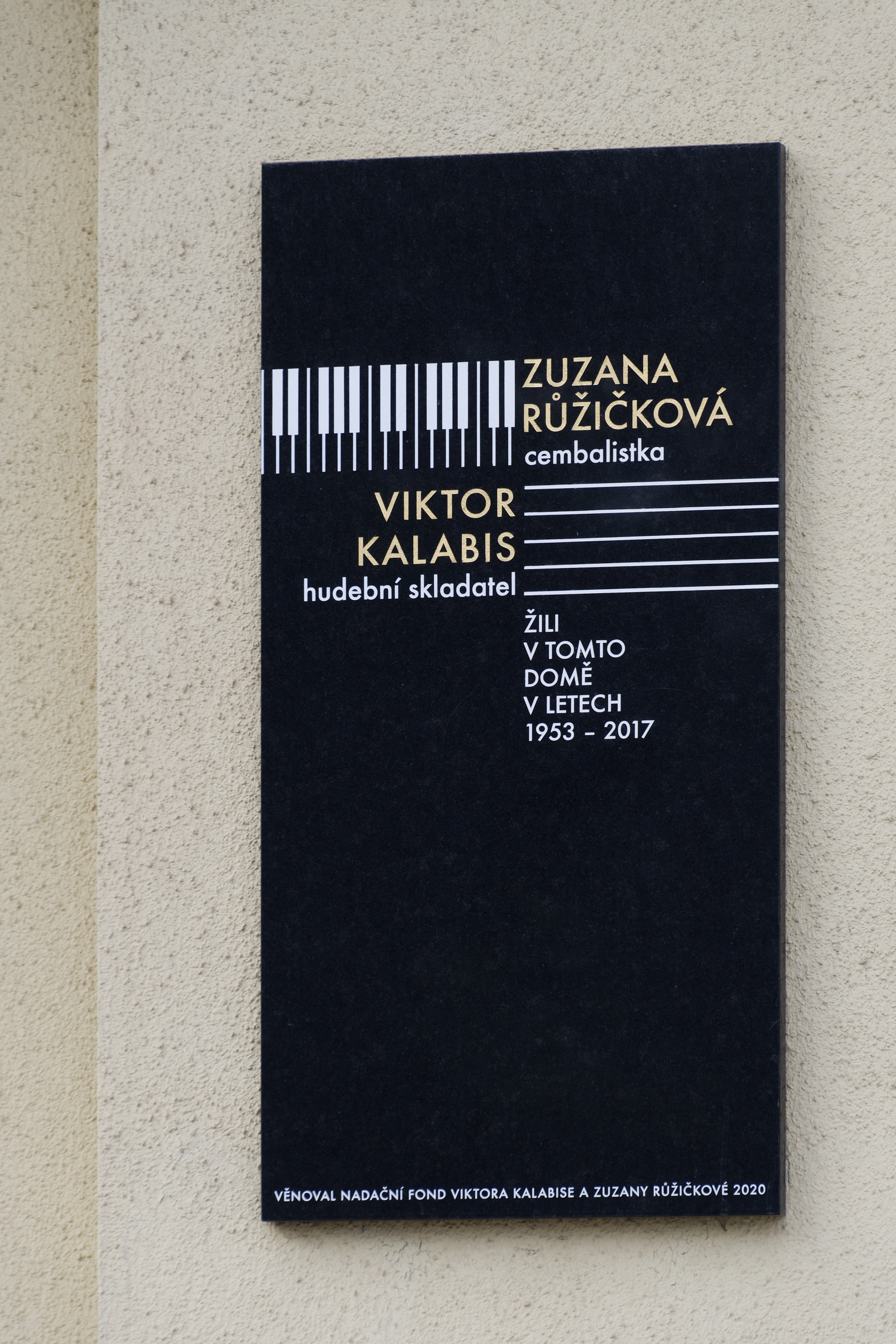
Memorial plaque of Zuzana Růžičková and Viktor Kalabis, Prague 3, Slezská 107, The Czech Republic

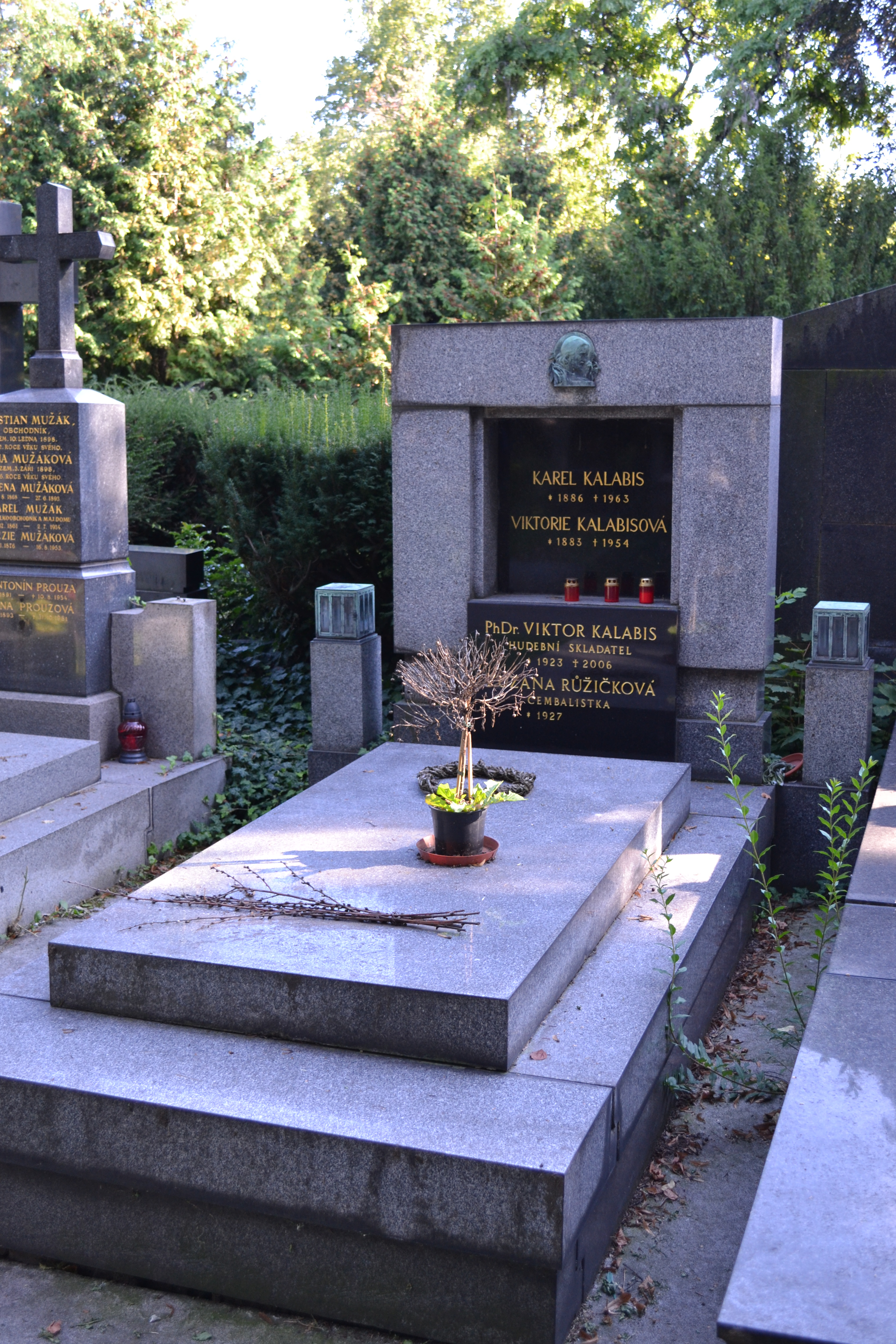
Grave of Kalabis at Vinohrady Cemetery in Prague

Viktor Kalabis (27 February 1923 – 28 September 2006) was a Czech composer, music editor and musicologist. He was the husband of harpsichordist Zuzana Růžičková.

== Life ==
Born in Červený Kostelec, Kalabis was interested in music from a young age, but due to the Nazi occupation of Prague during the Second World War, he was unable to study music in Prague. After the end of the war, Kalabis studied at the Prague Conservatory and at the Academy of Music and Charles University.

In 1952, Kalabis married Zuzana Růžičková, who became a famous harpsichord player. They both refused to join the Communist Party, which impeded the beginning of their music careers. Eventually, Kalabis got work in the children's music section at Czechoslovak Radio, where he established the Concertino Praga competition for young musicians.

In 1957, Manuel Rosenthal performed Kalabis' Concert for violoncello op. 8 at the Orchestre de Paris at the Théâtre des Champs-Élysées, which brought Kalabis new opportunities. His works were commissioned, for example, by the Czech Philharmonic, the Dresden Philharmonic, Camerata Zurich, Josef Suk, The Suk Trio, János Starker, Maurice André, the Prague Spring Festival and others. His composition Sinfonia pacis is one of the world's most-played Czech contemporary music compositions.

Although most of Kalabis's works are symphonic, concertante or chamber compositions, he composed several vocal works such as the cantata Canticum Canticorum, the chamber cantata Vojna (The War), song cycles and choruses. For stage, he wrote the Fable for chamber orchestra and the two-part ballet score Dva světy (Two Worlds), inspired by Lewis Carroll's book Alice's Adventures in Wonderland. The video recording of this ballet was given the "Parents' Choice Award" of 1993 in the United States. In 1967, he received the Prize of the Czechoslovak Music Critics and in 1969 he was awarded the State Prize.

According to Aleš Březina, a close friend of Kalabis', "his beginnings in the fifties and in the early sixties were deeply influenced by people like Stravinsky and Hindemith, and Honegger and Bartók – and Martinů of course."

Eventually, Kalabis became President of the Bohuslav Martinů Foundation. Here he established the Bohuslav Martinů Institute for Studies and Information, launched the Martinů Festival and competition, and created a base from which Bohuslav Martinů's work has become far better known.

== Death ==
Kalabis died on 28 September 2006. The Viktor Kalabis & Zuzana Růžičková Foundation was established in his memory, with Zuzana Růžičková as the President of the Board of Directors for the Foundation.

== Works ==
The Viktor Kalabis and Zuzana Růžičková Foundation has the following list of musical compositions.

Ballets

- "Two Worlds"
- "Fable"

Symphonies

- Symphony No. 1
- Symphony No. 2 "Sinfonia pacis"
- Symphony No. 3 (1970–71)
- Symphony No. 4 (1972)
- Symphony No. 5 (1976)

Symphonic music

- Suite for orchestra "Festival of Straznice"
- Symphonic Variations
- Concerto for large orchestra

Instrumental concertos

- Concerto for piano and orchestra No. 1
- Concerto for piano and wind instruments No. 2
- Concerto for violin and orchestra No. 1
- Concerto for violin and orchestra No. 2
- Concerto for harpsichord and string orchestra
- Fantasia Concertante for viola and string orchestra
- Concerto for violoncello and orchestra
- Concerto for trumpet and orchestra ("Le Tambour de Villevielle")
- Concerto for bassoon and wind instruments

Compositions for chamber orchestra

- Diptych for string orchestra
- Chamber Music for Strings
- Concerto for Chamber Orchestra "Hommage a Stravinsky"

String quartets

- String Quartet No. 1
- String Quartet No. 2
- String Quartet No. 3
- String Quartet No. 4
- String Quartet No. 5 "In Memory of M. Chagall"
- String Quartet No. 6 "In Memory of B. Martinu"
- String Quartet No. 7

Piano quartet

- Ludus for piano quartet op. 82 (1996)

Nonets

- Classical Nonet
- Nonet "Homage to Nature"

Compositions for wind instruments

- Incantation - Tredecet Op. 69 for 2 Fl, Ob, Cor ingl, 2 Cl, 4 Cor, 2 Bsn, 1 movt., 11' - 13'
- Septet "Strange Pipers" Op. 72 for 2 Ob, 2 Cor ingl, 2 Bsn, CBsn, Op. 72, 1 movt., 8'30" - 10'
- Octet "Spring Whistles" Op. 50 (1979) for 2 Ob, 2 Cl, 2 Cor, 2 Bsn, 10'
- Divertimento for wind quintet Op. 10, 5 parts, 17' - 18'
- Small Chamber Music for wind quintet Op. 27, 3 movements, 11' - 12'

Duos with piano

- Sonata for violin and piano
- Hallelujah for violin and piano
- Sonata for viola and piano
- Sonata for cello and piano
- Sonata for clarinet and piano
- Suite for clarinet and piano
- Suite ("Bagpiper's") for oboe and piano
- Fantasie for oboe and piano
- Variations for French horn and piano
- Sonata for trombone and piano, Op. 32 (1970)

Duos with harpsichord

- Sonata for violin and harpsichord
- Dialogues for violoncello and harpsichord
- "Four Pictures" for flute and harpsichord

Duos for other instrumentation

- Duettina for violin and cello
- Duettina for cello and double bass
- 3 Impressions for two clarinets
- Small Suite for two bassoons
- Couples for two flutes
- Compositions for solo instruments

Piano

- Accents (Expressive studies for piano)
- Entrata, Aria e Toccata for piano,
- 3 Polkas for piano
- 4 Enigmas for Graham
- 2 Toccatas for piano
- Allegro impetuoso for piano
  1. Sonata
  2. Sonata
  3. Sonata

Harpsichord

- 6 Two-Voices Canonic Inventions
- Aquarelles
- Preludio, Aria e Toccata, "I casi di Sisyphos"

Violoncello

- 3 Monologues for cello solo
- Rondo Drammatico for cello solo

Flute

- 3 Pieces for flute
- "Tempting" for flute

French horn

- Invocation for French horn solo

Guitar

- "Reminiscences"

Organ

- Symphonic Fresco for organ, "Afresco sinfonico"

Vocal Compositions

- Cantatas
- "Canticum canticorum" for mixed choir, chamber orchestra, alto, tenor
- "The War" for mixed choir, flute, and piano on folk poetry

Songs with orchestral accompaniment

- 5 Romantic Love Songs to words by R.M. Rilke
- "Bird's Weddings" for higher voice and piano
- "Carousel of Life" for lower voice and piano to words by R.M. Rilke

Mixed choirs

- "Dawn", "Autumn", 2 choirs to words by Vl. Sefl

Children choirs

- Children Songs (with piano accompaniment)
- Album of Folksongs (with piano)
- 4 Songs for Little Children (with piano)
- We Sing a Song (with flute and oboe)
- Three Children Choirs (with piano)
