= Visionintoart =

- Company type: 501 (c) (3)
- Genre: Collaborative Performance Art
- Founded: 1999
- Founder: Paola Prestini, Nora Kroll-Rosenbaum
- Headquarters: New York City, NY
- Website: VisionIntoArt

VisionIntoArt (VIA) is a non-profit new music and interdisciplinary arts production company based in the New York City. The group was founded in 1999 by Nora Kroll-Rosenbaum and Paola Prestini while they were students at the Juilliard School.

== History ==
VIA’s first performance took place in a dance studio at Juilliard in 1998, featuring a group of dancers, musicians, actors, and filmmakers who sought to create performance work that drew upon world culture. Since then, they have performed and toured globally at venues such as Lincoln Center, Symphony Space, the Brooklyn Academy of Music, the Whitney Museum, and several international festivals. Over the first ten years, the group collaborated with artists across a wide array of mediums, including poet Roger Bonair-Agard, artist Erika Harrsch, and videographer Carmen Kordas.

In recent times, VIA has restructured its organization, functioning more as a production company and less as a performance ensemble. In 2009, VIA collaborated with Beth Morrison Projects and Opera on Tap for the first time, presenting "21c Liederabend," an evening of music by composers from the twenty-first century.

== Discography ==
- Sounds (2009)
- Traveling Songs (2009)
