= Peter Watchorn =

Australian harpsichordist (born 1957)

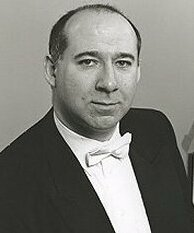
Watchorn (2 October 2003)

Peter Watchorn (born 30 May 1957) is an Australian-born harpsichordist who has combined a virtuosic keyboard technique, musical scholarship and practical experience in the construction of harpsichords copied from original instruments of the 17th and 18th centuries. As well as presenting many solo public performances and broadcasts of baroque keyboard music and participating in choral and orchestral performances, he has made numerous commercial CD recordings of solo harpsichord music from the 17th and 18th centuries.

He specialises in the music of J. S. Bach, 17th-century French and German music, and the works of the English virginalist composers. He is widely recognised as an expert on the history of the early music revival during the 20th century. His biography of the Viennese harpsichordist Isolde Ahlgrimm (1914–95) was published by Ashgate in December 2007.

== Biography ==
Watchorn first studied early keyboard performance with Margaret Lloyd in his birthplace of Newcastle, Australia, and then with Nancy Salas in Sydney during the 1970s. With Nancy Salas, he presented a series of 12 joint lecture-recitals on the second book of JS Bach's Well-Tempered Clavier at the New South Wales Conservatorium of Music. During the 1980s, he performed on harpsichord and chamber organ with the Sydney Symphony Orchestra and the Australian period-instrument ensemble the Telemann Trio (with Owen Watkins, recorder and Margaret Waugh, cello). During this period, he worked closely with Melbourne instrument-maker Alastair McAllister on harpsichord design and construction, learning from McAllister advanced techniques of voicing, action set-up and the theory of harpsichord scaling and geometry. From 1980, he became the Australian representative for Frank Hubbard Harpsichords of Waltham, Massachusetts, and introduced their instruments to players and institutions throughout the east coast of Australia.

From 1985 to 1992, he studied harpsichord performance in Vienna with Isolde Ahlgrimm, who had played a central role in developing the revival of interest in the use of period instruments for the performance of Baroque and Classical music. In 1985, he won the Erwin Bodky Award in the Bach section of the early-music performance competition in Boston. He has made Boston his base since joining the staff of Frank Hubbard in that city in 1987. In 1993, he joined the faculty of the Baroque Performance Institute, held every summer at Oberlin Conservatory, Ohio, as curator of keyboard instruments and adjunct keyboard faculty, where he regularly performed solo and in ensemble. He received the Doctor of Musical Arts degree in 1995 from Boston University with his dissertation A Performer's Guide to the English Suites of JS Bach. He taught harpsichord at Harvard University's Mather House during the late 1990s. He was a member of ensembles Concerto Armonico Wien (directed by Peter Matzka) and Concerto Armonico (with Owen Watkins, recorder and Geoffrey Burgess, baroque oboe). He continues in his role of continuo keyboardist and artistic advisor to Publick Musick—based in Rochester, New York and directed by Thomas Folan—and co-directed the Boston Bach Ensemble with Julian Wachner, from 1995 to 2001.

Peter Watchorn plays a harpsichord by Alastair McAllister, Melbourne, 1999, and a rare pedal harpsichord, by Hubbard & Broekman, Boston, 1990. In addition to instruments after French and Flemish originals, he has collaborated in the design and construction of Italian harpsichords with David Werbeloff in Boston, patterning them after the 1693 Italian (Giusti) in the Smithsonian Institution and the 1697 Grimaldi in Nürnberg, and has worked with the Boston-based painter and historian Sheridan Germann in production of both Flemish and French instruments. In 1993, he produced the first workshop drawing of the 1642 Hans Moermans (II)double-manual harpsichord in the J. Rodger Mirrey collection in London, a notable early example of the non-transposing Flemish two-manual instrument. The first modern copy was constructed by Zuckermann Harpsichords International in 2007, and is now housed at Oberlin Conservatory, Ohio, US.

Peter Watchorn is co-founder (with David Fox) of the award-winning CD label Musica Omnia. He has served as executive producer for numerous releases by artists such as Max van Egmond, The Atlantis Trio & Ensemble (with Jaap Schroeder, Enid Sutherland and Penelope Crawford), Emlyn Ngai, Saskia Coolen, Sally Pinkas, Mahan Esfahani, Publick Musick, the Magnificat Ensemble and The Adaskin String Trio. With Emlyn Ngai he recorded (for Musica Omnia) JS Bach's six sonatas for violin and harpsichord. In 2008 he was appointed to the faculty of Boston College and teaches a Music of the Baroque class there.

== Bibliography ==
- Watchorn, Peter. Isolde Ahlgrimm, Vienna and the early music revival, Ashgate/Routledge, Burlington Vermont; Aldershot, UK; 2007; 247 pp (Early education and influences; Instrument collecting; Erich Fiala and the Concerte; Kenner und Liebhaber, 1934–56; Philips Phonographische Industrie and J.S. Bach: the complete works for harpsichord; After the deluge: artistic independence—the years 1956–84)
- Watchorn, Peter. Winkelman, Regula. Die Cembalistin Isolde Ahlgrimm, 1914 - 1995: Eine Wegbereiterin der historischen Auffuehrungspraxis, Boehlau-Verlag, Wien, 2016

== Discography ==
- JS Bach, Cantatas BWV 211 & 212, Brandenburg Concerto No. 5, BWV 1050 (with Peter Matzka, Kate Clark, Herwig Tachezi and Concerto Armonico Wien, 1995, Wiener Konzerthaus)
- Johann Sebastian Bach, English Suites BWV 806–811 (recorded October 1997, Musica Omnia)
- JS Bach, Christmas Oratorio BWV 248 (with the Marsh Chapel Choir and the Boston Bach Ensemble, November 1998, Musica Omnia)
- JS Bach, Toccatas BWV 910–916, Edition Bachakademie Vol. 104, (August 1999, Hänssler)
- JS Bach, Keyboard works 1, Box 8 (1999–2000, Hänssler)
- JS Bach, Concerti BWV 972–987; BWV 592a, Edition Bachakademie Vol. 111, (February 2000, Hänssler)
- Music of Tudor & Jacobean England – Byrd, Bull, Philips, Gibbons. (2000 & 2002, Musica Omnia)
- JS Bach, Six Sonatas for Violin and Harpsichord BWV 1014–1019 (with Emlyn Ngai, baroque violin, December 2000 and March 2001, Musica Omnia)
- GP Telemann: Seven Sonatas for recorder and basso continuo (with Saskia Coolen, recorder & Margriet Tindemans, viola da gamba)
- Bach, Lutheran Masses BWV 233–236 (with Publick Musick, directed by Thomas Folan, November 2004 and June 2005, Musica Omnia)
- JS Bach, Das Wohltemperierte Clavier, I: 24 Preludes & Fugues BWV 846–869 (harpsichord and pedal harpsichord, October 2005, Musica Omnia)
- JS Bach, Das Wohltemperierte Clavier, II: 24 Preludes & Fugues BWV 870–897 (harpsichord and pedal harpsichord, December 2009, Musica Omnia)
- JS Bach, Cantatas BWV 45, 62, 140 and 192 (with Publick Musick, directed by Thomas Folan, November 2005, Musica Omnia)
- John Bull: Complete Works for keyboard (w/Mahan Esfahani) vol. 1 of 7 recorded June 2007, Musica Omnia)
- JS Bach, Inventions & Sinfonias, BWV 772–801 (September 2007)
- JS Bach, French Suites & Little Preludes, BWV 812–817; 924 – 943 (2011)
- JS Bach, Six Partitas, BWV 825 – 830 (September 2013)
- JS Bach, French Overture, BWV 831; Italian Concerto, BWV 971; Four Duets, BWV 802 - 804; Capriccio, BWV 992; Sonata in D minor, BWV 964; Suites in E minor & C minor, BWV 996 - 997; Prelude, Fugue & Allegro in E flat major, BWV 998; Fantasias in C minor, BWV 918, 919 & 906 (September 2014)
- JS Bach, Toccatas, BWV 910 - 916; Pastorale, BWV 590; Fantasias, Preludes & Fugues, BWV 894, 899 - 902, 903-4, 917, 944, 575 (June 2016)
- JS Bach, Goldberg Variations, BWV 988 (September, 2020)
