= Winsome Evans =

Australian musicologist

Winsome Joan Evans OAM BEM (born 26 October 1941), is one of Australia's premier early music specialists.

== Biography ==
She received a Bachelor of Music (Honours) degree in composition from the University of Sydney, where her lecturers included Peter Sculthorpe. In addition to her activities as a professional harpsichordist, composer, and arranger, she is known for her role as director of the Renaissance Players, one of Australia's leading early music ensembles. She was an associate professor of music at the University of Sydney.

Evans has "re-composed" all of Johann Sebastian Bach's works for solo violin as works for clavicembalo, adding accompaniments as she believes Bach must have had in mind. Her recording of her recomposition of the 6 Sonatas and Partitas, BWV 1001–1006, was released in 2009.

In 2017 she donated a harpsichord made by Mars McMillan to Sancta Sabina College in Sydney.

== Awards and honours ==
In 1980 she was awarded the British Empire Medal (BEM) in the Queen's Birthday Honours List and the NSW Jaycees' Award for services to music. In 1986 she was awarded the Medal of the Order of Australia (OAM) for services to music.

She was featured, along with her colleague Australian composer and music professor Anne Boyd, in the documentary Facing the Music.

She uses the name Snave Pluckpayres in some contexts.

== Sources ==
- Sydney Morning Herald article
- Record company biography
- Sydney University biography
